= National Register of Historic Places listings in Nebraska =

More than 1,100 properties and districts in Nebraska are on the National Register of Historic Places. Of these, 20 are National Historic Landmarks. There are listings in 90 of the state's 93 counties.

This National Park Service list is complete through NPS recent listings posted October 30, 2026.

== Current listings by county ==
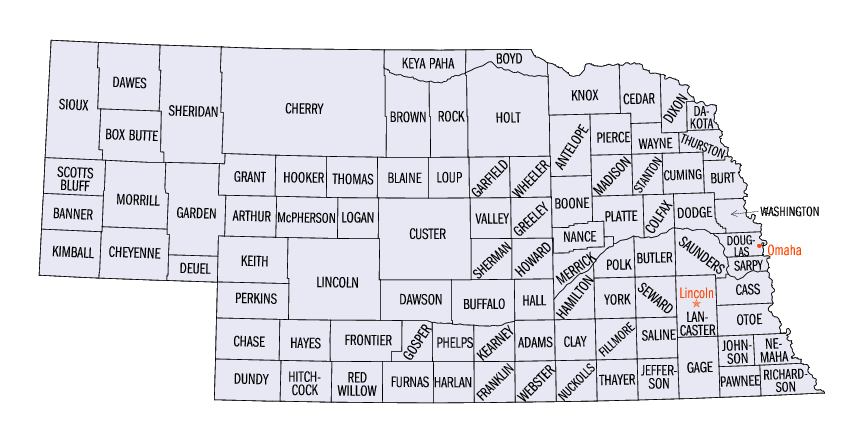
Nebraska counties (clickable)

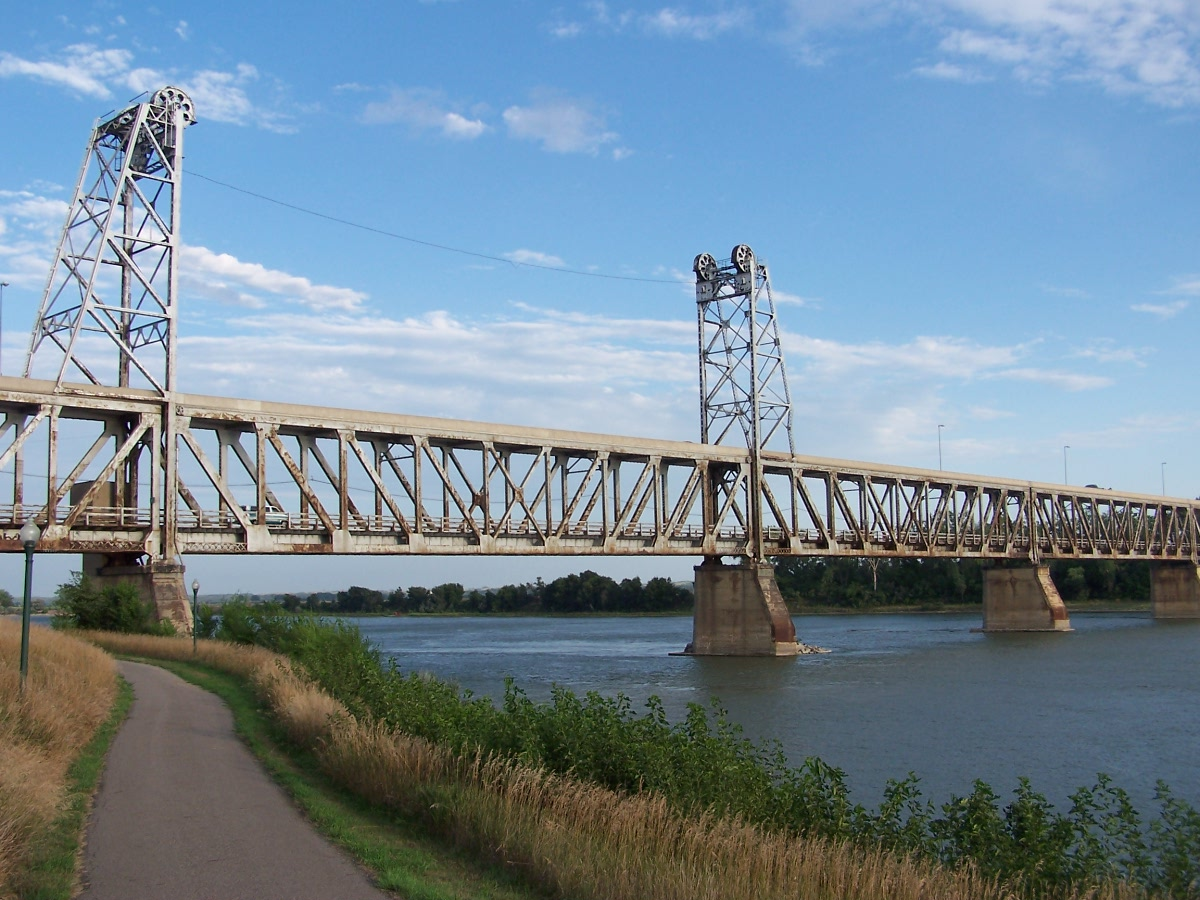
Meridian Highway Bridge Cedar County

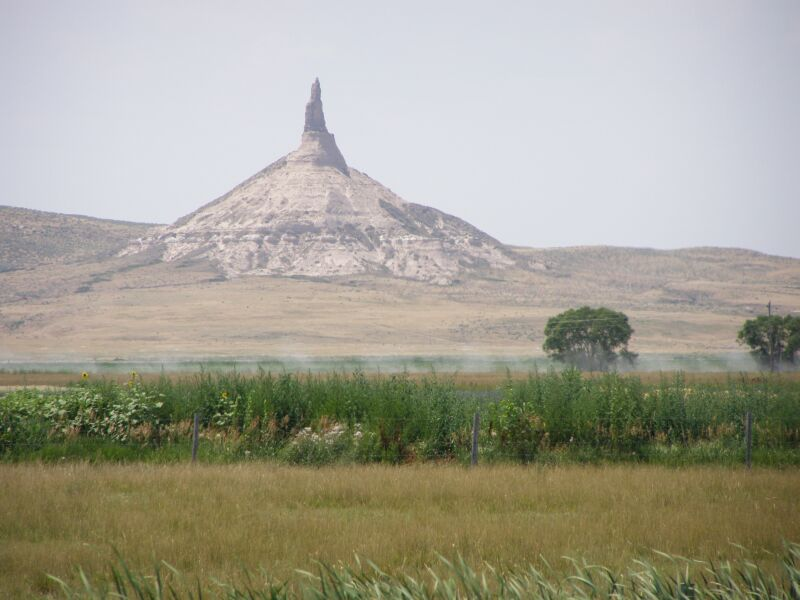
Chimney Rock National Historic Site Morrill County

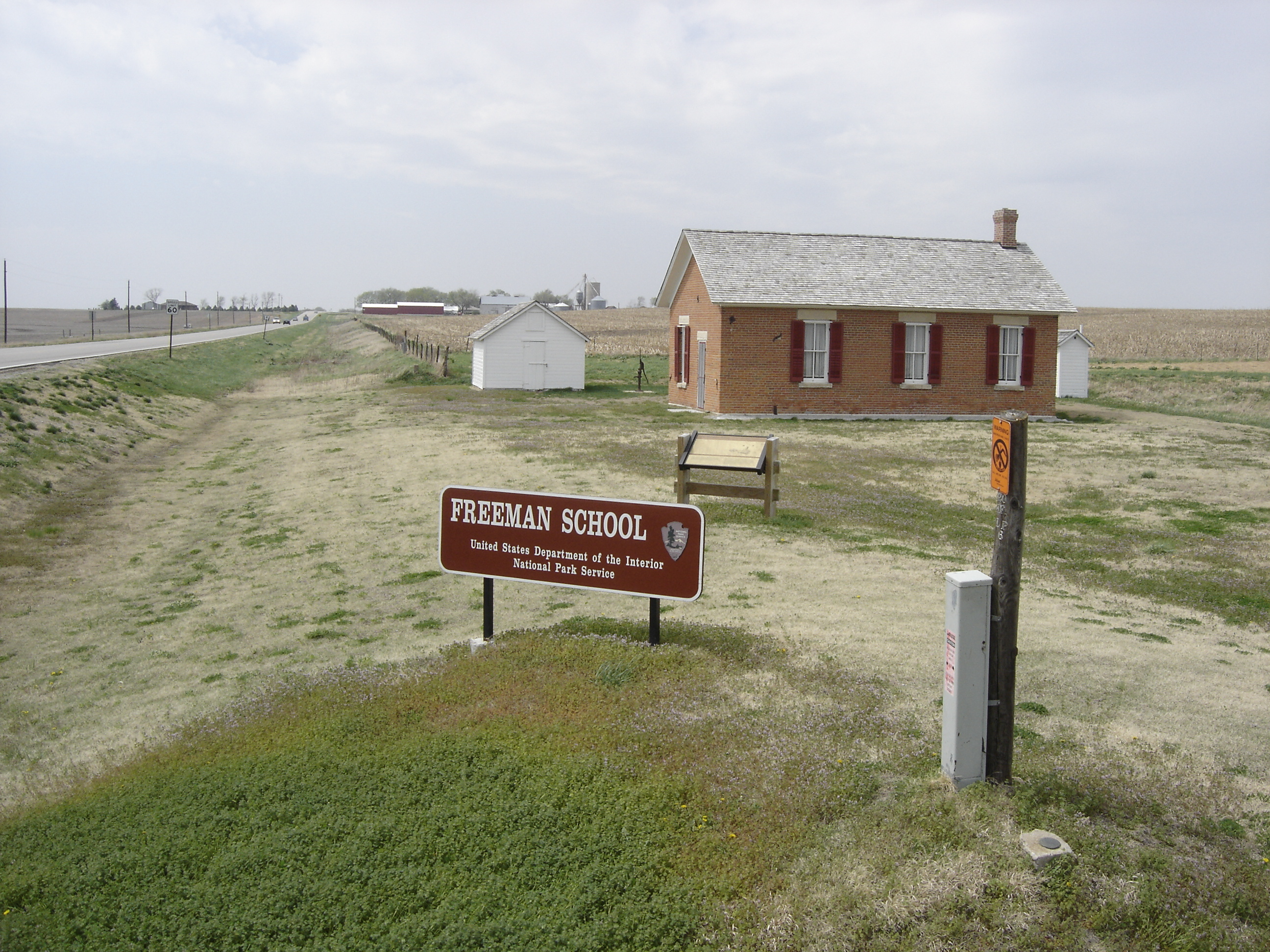
Homestead National Monument of America Gage County

	County	# of Sites
1	Adams	22
2	Antelope	11
3	Arthur	2
4	Banner	1
5	Blaine	0
6	Boone	6
7	Box Butte	4
8	Boyd	5
9	Brown	1
10	Buffalo	24
11	Burt	14
12	Butler	14
13	Cass	33
14	Cedar	14
15	Chase	7
16	Cherry	13
17	Cheyenne	11
18	Clay	10
19	Colfax	13
20	Cuming	3
21	Custer	14
22	Dakota	5
23	Dawes	15
24	Dawson	10
25	Deuel	5
26	Dixon	6
27	Dodge	23
28	Douglas	198
29	Dundy	2
30	Fillmore	20
31	Franklin	4
32	Frontier	2
33	Furnas	2
34	Gage	31
35	Garden	7
36	Garfield	3
37	Gosper	1
38	Grant	2
39	Greeley	6
40	Hall	29
41	Hamilton	6
43	Harlan	7
43	Hayes	3
44	Hitchcock	4
45	Holt	12
46	Hooker	3
47	Howard	7
48	Jefferson	15
49	Johnson	4
50	Kearney	8
51	Keith	14
52	Keya Paha	3
53	Kimball	4
54	Knox	14
55	Lancaster	110
56	Lincoln	11
57	Logan	0
58	Loup	2
59	Madison	12
60	McPherson	0
61	Merrick	9
62	Morrill	8
63	Nance	11
64	Nemaha	14
65	Nuckolls	7
66	Otoe	27
67	Pawnee	14
68	Perkins	4
69	Phelps	5
70	Pierce	5
71	Platte	21
72	Polk	6
73	Red Willow	10
74	Richardson	13
75	Rock	4
76	Saline	20
77	Sarpy	20
79	Saunders	20
79	Scotts Bluff	21
80	Seward	11
81	Sheridan	10
82	Sherman	5
83	Sioux	7
84	Stanton	1
85	Thayer	3
86	Thomas	1
87	Thurston	8
88	Valley	7
89	Washington	16
90	Wayne	5
91	Webster	37
92	Wheeler	2
93	York	7
(duplicates)		(9)
TOTAL		1,182

== Arthur County ==
	Name on the Register	Image	Date listed	Location	City or town	Description
1	First Arthur County Courthouse and Jail	First Arthur County Courthouse and Jail	January 10, 1990 (#89002241)	Marshall St. between Fir and Elm Sts. 41°34′12″N 101°41′25″W	Arthur	Spartan wood-frame county courthouse (1914) and jail (1915), the first government buildings erected in the newly formed Arthur County.
2	Pilgrim Holiness Church	Pilgrim Holiness Church	June 18, 1979 (#79001434)	Off Nebraska Highway 61; 41°34′15″N 101°41′18″W	Arthur	1928 church built of baled hay, a widely used construction material in the Sandhills due to the lack of basic alternatives like timber or sod.

== Banner County ==
	Name on the Register	Image	Date listed	Location	City or town	Description
1	C.C. Hampton Homestead	C.C. Hampton Homestead	December 13, 1984 (#84000501)	2170 County Road 40; 41°40′13″N 103°51′24″W	Harrisburg	1887–1902 homestead of a farmer who promoted water conservation and Aermotor windmills, helping region diversify from ranching into farming. Also known as "Warner Ranch".

== Blaine County ==
There are no properties listed on the National Register of Historic Places in Blaine County.

== Boone County ==
	Name on the Register	Image	Date listed	Location	City or town	Description
1	Albion Carnegie Library		March 25, 2019 (#100003569)	437 S. 3rd St. 41°41′21″N 97°59′59″W	Albion	
2	Cedar Rapids City Hall and Library	Cedar Rapids City Hall and Library	July 1, 1994 (#94000654)	423 W. Main St. 41°33′35″N 98°08′56″W	Cedar Rapids	1913 multi-function municipal hall featuring Italian Renaissance Revival architecture.
3	Petersburg Jail	Petersburg Jail	March 15, 2005 (#05000154)	Main St. and 2nd St. 41°51′15″N 98°04′47″W	Petersburg	1902 brick jail, Petersburg's first freestanding municipal structure, reflecting an early interest in public safety.
4	St. Anthony's Church and School	St. Anthony's Church and School	March 9, 2000 (#00000172)	514 W. Main St. and 103 N 6th St. 41°33′37″N 98°09′05″W	Cedar Rapids	1911 Georgian Revival Catholic school and 1918 Romanesque Revival church.
5	St. Bonaventure Church Complex	St. Bonaventure Church Complex	October 19, 1982 (#82000598)	Off Nebraska Highway 14; 41°53′44″N 98°03′06″W	Raeville	German-Catholic religious complex comprising a 1910 three-story school, 1917 Romanesque Revival church, 1920 Colonial Revival rectory, parish hall, cemetery, and orchard.
6	US Post Office-Albion	US Post Office-Albion	May 11, 1992 (#92000475)	310 W. Church St. 41°41′32″N 98°00′01″W	Albion	One of 12 Nebraska post offices featuring a Section of Fine Arts mural, "Nebraska in Winter" (1939) by Jenne Magafan.

== Box Butte County ==
	Name on the Register	Image	Date listed	Location	City or town	Description
1	Alliance Commercial Historic District	Alliance Commercial Historic District	March 21, 2007 (#07000180)	Roughly along Box Butte Ave. 42°05′54″N 102°52′15″W	Alliance	Commercial district with 44 contributing buildings dating back as far as 1893.
2	Box Butte County Courthouse	Box Butte County Courthouse	January 10, 1990 (#89002212)	Box Butte Ave. between E. 5th and 6th Sts. 42°05′59″N 102°52′13″W	Alliance	1913 brick Beaux-Arts courthouse. Also a contributing property to the Alliance Commercial Historic District.
3	City of Alliance Central Park Fountain	City of Alliance Central Park Fountain	November 28, 1990 (#90001772)	Junction of 10th St. and Niobrara Ave. 42°06′18″N 102°52′09″W	Alliance	1935 fountain with colored lights and timers, produced by General Electric and built with Works Progress Administration assistance.
4	Running Water Stage Station Site		February 20, 1975 (#75001089)	Address Restricted	Marsland	Site of a waystation on the Sidney Black Hills Stage Road, in operation 1874 to the mid-1880s.

== Boyd County ==
	Name on the Register	Image	Date listed	Location	City or town	Description
1	Lynch Archeological Site		December 2, 1974 (#74001101)	Address Restricted	Lynch	Site of a large earth lodge village occupied 1450–1550 CE, a rare Nebraskan example of a type mostly found in South Dakota.
2	Ponca Agency		July 12, 2006 (#06000554)	Address Restricted	Niobrara	Site of the federal agency that administered the Ponca Reservation from 1859 to 1877, listed for its possible archaeological evidence of a major transitional time in Ponca history.
3	SS Peter & Paul Catholic School	SS Peter & Paul Catholic School	January 7, 1992 (#91001751)	Southeastern corner of the junction of 2nd and Broadway Sts. 42°54′54″N 98°51′10″W	Butte	1909 parochial school designed by William L. Steele, a typical example of such schools built in many Catholic communities of Nebraska in the early 20th century.
4	The Tower	The Tower	December 29, 2004 (#04001413)	East of Gross, near the Missouri River; 42°56′09″N 98°28′41″W	Lynch	Also called Old Baldy, a 100-foot (30 m) unvegetated hill where the Lewis and Clark Expedition made the first scientific descriptions of the geologically unusual landmark and of prairie dogs, on September 7, 1804.
5	White Horse Ranch	White Horse Ranch	July 5, 1990 (#90000984)	Southeast of Naper between the Keya Paha and Niobrara Rivers; 42°52′30″N 99°03′34″W	Naper	1936 ranch where the American Albino color breed of horses originated, now the American creme and white horse registry.

=== Former listings ===
	Name on the Register	Image	Date listed	Date removed	Location	City or town	Description
1	Ponca Creek Bridge	Ponca Creek Bridge	June 29, 1992 (#92000769)	March 25, 2019	County road over Ponca Creek, 3 miles east of Lynch; 42°49′27″N 98°24′25″W	Lynch	Apparently no longer extant

== Brown County ==
	Name on the Register	Image	Date listed	Location	City or town	Description
1	Miller Hotel	Miller Hotel	November 27, 1989 (#89002041)	199 W. 3rd St. 42°32′02″N 99°42′07″W	Long Pine	1895 house expanded into a hotel in 1914—when Long Pine boomed as a major railroad terminus—exhibiting an old-fashioned "longitudinal block" layout more typical of Nebraska's earliest hotels. Now a local history museum.

== Cuming County ==
	Name on the Register	Image	Date listed	Location	City or town	Description
1	John G. Neihardt Study	John G. Neihardt Study	July 28, 1970 (#70000369)	Northwestern corner of Washington and Grove Sts. 42°00′40″N 96°34′39″W	Bancroft	Freestanding office of Nebraska Poet Laureate John Neihardt from 1911 to 1920. Now a state historic site.
2	Rattlesnake Creek Bridge	Rattlesnake Creek Bridge	June 29, 1992 (#92000743)	County road over Rattlesnake Creek, 2.8 miles northwest of Bancroft; 42°02′39″N 96°36′49″W	Bancroft	1903 steel Pratt half-hip pony truss bridge, oldest known example of a type designed by the Standard Bridge Company of Omaha and built throughout eastern Nebraska.
3	West Point City Auditorium	West Point City Auditorium	November 10, 2009 (#09000904)	237 N. Main St. 41°50′31″N 96°42′45″W	West Point	1911 auditorium significant as a local venue for performing arts and community events, financed by local donations and ultimately purchased by the city in 1945.

== Dakota County ==
	Name on the Register	Image	Date listed	Location	City or town	Description
1	Ben Bonderson Farm	Ben Bonderson Farm	November 8, 2006 (#06000993)	1541 270th St. 42°16′45″N 96°38′30″W	Emerson	Well-preserved family farm with eight buildings and two structures dating back to 1883.
2	Emmanuel Lutheran Church	Emmanuel Lutheran Church	October 15, 1969 (#69000129)	1500 Hickory St. 42°24′45″N 96°25′04″W	Dakota City	One of Nebraska's oldest known churches, built in 1860 as the state's first Lutheran house of worship and one of its only Greek Revival churches of any denomination.
3	Homer Site	Homer Site	August 14, 1973 (#73001058)	Junction of U.S. Route 77 and Omaha Creek, northeast of Homer; 42°19′44″N 96°28′48″W	Homer	Site of Ton-won-tonga, the principal village of the Omaha people, occupied on and off from 1775 to 1845, bastion of indigenous control over trade on the Upper Missouri River.
4	Meisch House	Meisch House	March 13, 1986 (#86000387)	213 17th St. 42°28′26″N 96°24′54″W	South Sioux City	Square brick house built in 1888.
5	Cornelius O'Connor House	Cornelius O'Connor House	November 23, 1977 (#77000826)	F Ave. and Blyburg Rd. 42°18′40″N 96°27′45″W	Homer	c. 1875 Italianate house of a carpenter, with interior woodwork done by O'Connor in dark walnut.

== Deuel County ==
	Name on the Register	Image	Date listed	Location	City or town	Description
1	Deuel County Courthouse	Deuel County Courthouse	January 10, 1990 (#89002239)	718 3rd St. 41°05′38″N 102°28′19″W	Chappell	1915 brick Classical Revival courthouse designed by John J. Huddart.
2	Menter Farmstead	Menter Farmstead	December 7, 2011 (#11000886)	1270 North Fork Rd. 41°05′00″N 102°05′40″W	Big Springs vicinity	Farmstead built 1919–1928 during a regional agricultural boom sparked by winter wheat demand in World War I, and reflecting increased mechanization with its grain elevator and concrete block construction.
3	Phelps Hotel	Phelps Hotel	October 15, 1970 (#70000370)	Northeastern corner of 2nd and Pine Sts. 41°03′47″N 102°04′28″W	Big Springs	1885 frame hotel, the most notable 19th-century building in Deuel County.
4	Fred and Minnie Meyer Sudman House	Fred and Minnie Meyer Sudman House	December 6, 1990 (#90001770)	490 Vincent Ave. 41°05′44″N 102°28′19″W	Chappell	1911 frame house whose vernacular architecture atypically incorporates elements from Renaissance style.
5	Wallace W. Waterman Sod House	Wallace W. Waterman Sod House	February 17, 1995 (#95000096)	Day Rd., 9 miles north of Big Springs; 41°11′22″N 102°04′25″W	Big Springs	

== Dixon County ==
	Name on the Register	Image	Date listed	Location	City or town	Description
1	Cook Blacksmith Shop	Cook Blacksmith Shop	December 27, 1974 (#74001106)	204 3rd St. 42°33′45″N 96°42′27″W	Ponca	
2	Dixon County Courthouse	Dixon County Courthouse	January 10, 1990 (#89002247)	3rd and Iowa Sts. 42°33′46″N 96°42′32″W	Ponca	
3	Emerson City Park		March 5, 2018 (#100002165)	Square block between 4th, 5th, Main & Logan Sts. 42°16′55″N 96°43′37″W	Emerson	
4	Indian Hill Archeological District		July 6, 1984 (#84002460)	Address Restricted	New Castle	
5	Ponca Historic District	Ponca Historic District	May 18, 1979 (#79001438)	Roughly bounded by East, Court, 2nd, and 3rd Sts. 42°33′51″N 96°42′27″W	Ponca	
6	Swedish Evangelical Lutheran Salem Church	Swedish Evangelical Lutheran Salem Church	February 1, 1983 (#83001088)	Off Nebraska Highway 35; 42°16′02″N 96°51′46″W	Wakefield	

== Dundy County ==
	Name on the Register	Image	Date listed	Location	City or town	Description
1	Dundy County Courthouse	Dundy County Courthouse	January 10, 1990 (#89002237)	W. 7th Ave. and Chief St. 40°03′02″N 101°31′59″W	Benkelman	
2	Zorn Theatre	Zorn Theatre	February 25, 2021 (#100006190)	706 Chief St. 40°03′02″N 101°31′58″W	Benkelman	

== Frontier County ==
	Name on the Register	Image	Date listed	Location	City or town	Description
1	Mowry Bluff Archeological Site	Mowry Bluff Archeological Site	July 12, 1974 (#74001115)	Western side of Medicine Creek, immediately east of the center of Section 25, Township 5 North, Range 26 West; 40°22′19″N 100°13′26″W	Cambridge	
2	Red Smoke Archeological Site		October 1, 1974 (#74001116)	Along Lime Creek immediately southeast of the center of Section 15, Township 5 North, Range 26 West; 40°23′58″N 100°15′35″W	Stockville	

== Furnas County ==
	Name on the Register	Image	Date listed	Location	City or town	Description
1	Cambridge State Aid Bridge	Cambridge State Aid Bridge	June 29, 1992 (#92000763)	Nebraska Highway 47 over the Republican River, 0.6 miles south of Cambridge; 40°16′25″N 100°09′56″W	Cambridge	
2	W. H. Faling House	W. H. Faling House	November 22, 1999 (#99001388)	606 Parker St. 40°16′57″N 100°10′07″W	Cambridge	

== Garden County ==
	Name on the Register	Image	Date listed	Location	City or town	Description
1	Ash Hollow Cave	Ash Hollow Cave	October 15, 1966 (#66000445)	Address Restricted	Lewellen	
2	Ash Hollow Historic District	Ash Hollow Historic District	August 6, 1975 (#75001093)	Southwest of Lewellen along U.S. Route 26; 41°16′53″N 102°06′27″W	Lewellen	
3	Garden County Courthouse	Garden County Courthouse	January 10, 1990 (#89002231)	F and Main Sts. 41°24′30″N 102°20′37″W	Oshkosh	
4	Lewellen State Aid Bridge	Lewellen State Aid Bridge	June 29, 1992 (#92000756)	County road over the North Platte River, 1 mile south of Lewellen; 41°19′03″N 102°08′34″W	Lewellen	
5	Lisco State Aid Bridge	Lisco State Aid Bridge	June 29, 1992 (#92000757)	County road over the North Platte River, 0.6 miles south of Lisco; 41°29′22″N 102°37′30″W	Lisco	
6	Oshkosh Water Tower	Oshkosh Water Tower	June 26, 2019 (#100004140)	103 East Ave. E. 41°24′24″N 102°20′38″W	Oshkosh	
7	Rackett Grange Hall No. 318	Rackett Grange Hall No. 318	July 5, 2001 (#01000713)	9250 Road 193; 41°39′53″N 102°12′16″W	Lewellen	

== Garfield County ==
	Name on the Register	Image	Date listed	Location	City or town	Description
1	Burwell Carnegie Library	Burwell Carnegie Library	July 11, 2006 (#06000557)	110 S. 7th Ave. 41°46′55″N 99°07′58″W	Burwell	
2	Garfield County Frontier Fairgrounds	Garfield County Frontier Fairgrounds	May 9, 1985 (#85001005)	Off Nebraska Highway 91; 41°46′31″N 99°07′23″W	Burwell	
3	Hub Building	Hub Building	July 12, 2006 (#06000558)	180 Grand Ave. 41°46′54″N 99°08′07″W	Burwell	

=== Former listings ===
	Name on the Register	Image	Date listed	Date removed	Location	City or town	Description
1	Burwell Bridge	Burwell Bridge	June 29, 1992 (#92000715)	March 25, 2019	Nebraska Highway 11 over the North Loup River; 41°46′04″N 99°07′31″W	Burwell	

== Gosper County ==
	Name on the Register	Image	Date listed	Location	City or town	Description
1	Gosper County Courthouse	Gosper County Courthouse	July 5, 1990 (#90000961)	507 Smith Ave. 40°35′16″N 99°51′38″W	Elwood	

== Grant County ==
	Name on the Register	Image	Date listed	Location	City or town	Description
1	Abbott Ranch Headquarters		August 11, 2021 (#100006795)	83857 North NE 61; 42°00′13″N 101°46′02″W	Hyannis	
2	Hotel DeFair	Hotel DeFair	October 29, 1976 (#76001132)	Nebraska Highway 2 and Main St. 42°00′03″N 101°45′43″W	Hyannis	

== Greeley County ==
	Name on the Register	Image	Date listed	Location	City or town	Description
1	Church of the Visitation of the Blessed Virgin Mary	Church of the Visitation of the Blessed Virgin Mary	February 23, 1984 (#84002472)	Off Nebraska Highway 56; 41°30′41″N 98°28′16″W	O'Connor	
2	First Presbyterian Church	First Presbyterian Church	April 14, 2004 (#04000292)	260 S. Pine St. 41°41′13″N 98°21′31″W	Spalding	
3	Greeley County Courthouse	Greeley County Courthouse	January 10, 1990 (#89002228)	Kildare St. 41°32′53″N 98°31′47″W	Greeley Center	
4	Scotia Chalk Building	Scotia Chalk Building	October 11, 1979 (#79003686)	Off Nebraska Highway 22; 41°27′54″N 98°42′09″W	Scotia	Built of chalk mined from bluff over the North Loup River
5	Spalding Power Plant and Dam	Spalding Power Plant and Dam	December 31, 1998 (#98001569)	10 County Rd. 41°40′54″N 98°21′37″W	Spalding	
6	St. Michael's Catholic Church Complex	St. Michael's Catholic Church Complex	December 15, 1983 (#83003990)	Northeast of Greeley Center; 41°41′25″N 98°21′46″W	Spalding	

== Hamilton County ==
	Name on the Register	Image	Date listed	Location	City or town	Description
1	Hamilton County Courthouse	Hamilton County Courthouse	July 29, 1985 (#85001665)	Courthouse Sq. 40°52′04″N 98°00′06″W	Aurora	
2	IOOF Opera House	IOOF Opera House	September 28, 1988 (#88000952)	N. 3rd and B Sts. 40°52′46″N 97°53′09″W	Hampton	
3	St. Johannes Danske Lutherske Kirke	St. Johannes Danske Lutherske Kirke	November 13, 1992 (#92001570)	2170 N. T Rd. 41°00′00″N 97°56′21″W	Marquette	
4	Streeter-Peterson House	Streeter-Peterson House	November 29, 1991 (#91001754)	1121 9th St. 40°52′05″N 98°00′24″W	Aurora	
5	Temple Craft Building	Temple Craft Building	November 12, 2014 (#14000916)	1127-1131 12th St. 40°52′06″N 98°00′12″W	Aurora	
6	United Brethren Church	United Brethren Church	December 3, 2008 (#08001133)	1103 K St. 40°51′58″N 98°00′15″W	Aurora	

=== Former listings ===
	Name on the Register	Image	Date listed	Date removed	Location	City or town	Description
1	Kathleen Hearn Building		August 1, 1984 (#84002480)	July 14, 2011	10th and O Sts. 40°52′13″N 98°00′22″W	Aurora	
2	Royal Highlanders Building	Royal Highlanders Building	September 12, 1985 (#85002144)	July 14, 2011	1235 M St. 40°52′08″N 98°00′04″W	Aurora	Damaged by fire July 10, 2008 and subsequently demolished.

== Harlan County ==
Alma Carnegie Library, 111 North John St., Alma, MP100007149, LISTED, 11/8/2021

	Name on the Register	Image	Date listed	Location	City or town	Description
1	Alma Carnegie Library	Alma Carnegie Library	November 8, 2021 (#100007149)	111 North John St. 40°05′57″N 99°21′44″W	Alma	
2	Alma City Auditorium and Sale Barn	Alma City Auditorium and Sale Barn	July 11, 2014 (#14000395)	800 block West Main Street; 40°05′50″N 99°21′50″W	Alma	
3	Hotel Orleans	Hotel Orleans	February 24, 2021 (#100006193)	101 East Pine St. 40°07′48″N 99°27′17″W	Orleans	
4	Prairie Dog Creek Bridge	Prairie Dog Creek Bridge	June 29, 1992 (#92000712)	Township road over Prairie Dog Creek, 8.5 miles south and 1 mile west of Orleans; 40°00′16″N 99°28′48″W	Orleans	
5	Cordelia Bennett Preston Memorial Library		February 24, 2021 (#100006192)	510 South Orleans Ave. 40°07′43″N 99°27′18″W	Orleans	
6	Sappa Creek Bridge	Sappa Creek Bridge	June 29, 1992 (#92000713)	County road over Sappa Creek, 2 miles east of Stamford; 40°07′53″N 99°33′17″W	Stamford	
7	Turkey Creek Bridge	Turkey Creek Bridge	June 29, 1992 (#92000711)	County road over Turkey Creek, 2 miles west and 1 mile south of Ragan; 40°17′33″N 99°19′57″W	Ragan	

== Hayes County ==
	Name on the Register	Image	Date listed	Location	City or town	Description
1	J.M. Daniel House	J.M. Daniel House	May 30, 1985 (#85001169)	Address Restricted	Hamlet	
2	J.M. Daniel School-District No. 3	J.M. Daniel School-District No. 3	May 30, 1985 (#85001170)	Address Restricted	Hamlet	
3	St. John's Evangelical Lutheran German Church and Cemetery	St. John's Evangelical Lutheran German Church and Cemetery	May 16, 1985 (#85001069)	Northeast of Hayes Center; 40°34′10″N 100°50′23″W	Hayes Center	

== Hitchcock County ==
	Name on the Register	Image	Date listed	Location	City or town	Description
1	Bridge	Bridge	June 29, 1992 (#92000714)	County road over an intermittent stream, 2 miles east of Stratton; 40°09′07″N 101°11′29″W	Stratton	
2	Massacre Canyon Battlefield	Massacre Canyon Battlefield	July 25, 1974 (#74001118)	Address Restricted	Trenton	
3	St. Paul's Methodist Protestant Church	St. Paul's Methodist Protestant Church	January 25, 1979 (#79001446)	South of Culbertson on Nebraska Highway 17; 40°06′52″N 100°48′55″W	Culbertson	
4	Weyl Service Station	Weyl Service Station	July 11, 2002 (#02000768)	124 E. D St. 40°10′32″N 101°00′41″W	Trenton	

== Hooker County ==
	Name on the Register	Image	Date listed	Location	City or town	Description
1	Hooker County Courthouse	Hooker County Courthouse	January 10, 1990 (#89002218)	Cleveland Ave. between Railroad and 1st Sts. 42°02′33″N 101°02′43″W	Mullen	
2	Humphrey Archeological Site		January 21, 1974 (#74001122)	Address restricted	Mullen	A village site near the Middle Loup River of the Dismal River Culture, from about A.D. 1675 to 1725.
3	Kelso Site		January 21, 1974 (#74001123)	Address Restricted	Mullen	A village site near the Middle Loup River, of the Woodland Culture, dating A.D. 500-1100.

== Howard County ==
	Name on the Register	Image	Date listed	Location	City or town	Description
1	Columbia Hall	Columbia Hall	July 22, 2005 (#05000724)	Junction of Nebraska Highway 58 and W. Roger Wetsch Ave. 41°07′06″N 98°32′50″W	Dannebrog	
2	Coufal Site		October 15, 1966 (#66000446)	Address Restricted	Cotesfield	
3	Dannevirke Danish Lutheran Church and Community Hall	Dannevirke Danish Lutheran Church and Community Hall	June 25, 1999 (#99000750)	Dannervirke Rd. and Wausa; 41°19′19″N 98°42′29″W	Elba	
4	Howard County Courthouse	Howard County Courthouse	January 10, 1990 (#89002233)	Indian St. between 6th and 7th Sts. 41°12′54″N 98°27′26″W	St. Paul	
5	Our Lady of Mount Carmel Church and Cemetery	Our Lady of Mount Carmel Church and Cemetery	November 9, 2020 (#100005769)	2450 17th Ave. 41°16′45″N 98°44′14″W	Ashton vicinity	
6	Palmer Site	Palmer Site	October 15, 1966 (#66000447)	Address Restricted	Palmer	Extends into Merrick County
7	St. Peder's Dansk Evangelical Lutheran Kirke	St. Peder's Dansk Evangelical Lutheran Kirke	March 21, 2007 (#07000177)	1796 7th Ave. 41°08′05″N 98°36′48″W	Nysted	

== Johnson County ==
	Name on the Register	Image	Date listed	Location	City or town	Description
1	Johnson County Courthouse	Johnson County Courthouse	January 10, 1990 (#89002246)	Courthouse Sq. 40°22′02″N 96°11′41″W	Tecumseh	
2	Tecumseh Historic District	Tecumseh Historic District	June 20, 1975 (#75001095)	Irregular pattern roughly bounded by Atchison and Nebraska railroad tracks, 9th and Washington Sts., and U.S. Route 136; 40°22′16″N 96°11′33″W	Tecumseh	As of September 2026 People's Natural Gas (255 Clay St) was no longer extant. Seavers House (587 N 5th St) as well as Hardenburg-Bartles Residence (800 block of N 4th St) buildings differ significantly from the photographs in the NRHP form.
3	Tecumseh Opera House	Tecumseh Opera House	September 28, 1988 (#88000929)	123 S. 3rd 40°22′04″N 96°11′46″W	Tecumseh	
4	George Townsend House	George Townsend House	November 2, 2006 (#06000996)	61872 U.S. Highway 136; 40°22′03″N 96°13′25″W	Tecumseh	

=== Former listings ===
	Name on the Register	Image	Date listed	Date removed	Location	City or town	Description
1	Keim Stone Arch Bridge	Keim Stone Arch Bridge	June 29, 1992 (#92000710)	March 25, 2019	County road 624 Av over an unnamed stream just south of 729 Rd, 3 miles east and 1 mile north of Tecumseh; 40°23′32″N 96°07′22″W	Tecumseh	

== Keya Paha County ==
	Name on the Register	Image	Date listed	Location	City or town	Description
1	Carns State Aid Bridge	Carns State Aid Bridge	June 29, 1992 (#92000722)	County road over the Niobrara River, 10.8 miles northeast of Bassett; 42°44′01″N 99°28′52″W	Bassett	Extends into Rock County
2	Keya Paha County High School	Keya Paha County High School	December 1, 1986 (#86003377)	Off Nebraska Highway 12; 42°49′32″N 99°44′48″W	Springview	
3	Lewis Bridge	Lewis Bridge	June 29, 1992 (#92000774)	County road over the Keya Paha River, 13.6 miles northeast of Springview; 42°59′53″N 99°38′08″W	Springview	Extends into Tripp County, South Dakota

== Kimball County ==
	Name on the Register	Image	Date listed	Location	City or town	Description
1	Fraternal Hall	Fraternal Hall	February 28, 1983 (#83001096)	2nd and Chestnut Sts. 41°14′13″N 103°39′46″W	Kimball	
2	Gridley-Howe-Faden-Atkins Farmstead	Gridley-Howe-Faden-Atkins Farmstead	July 9, 1997 (#97000727)	1 mile north of the junction of Nebraska Highway 71 and State St. 41°14′48″N 103°39′48″W	Kimball	
3	Kimball County Courthouse	Kimball County Courthouse	July 5, 1990 (#90000973)	114 E. 3rd St. 41°14′07″N 103°39′43″W	Kimball	
4	Maginnis Irrigation Aqueduct	Maginnis Irrigation Aqueduct	October 21, 1994 (#94001231)	South of U.S. Highway 30, 5 miles west of Kimball; 41°13′45″N 103°46′40″W	Kimball	
5	Wheat Growers Hotel	Wheat Growers Hotel	July 11, 2002 (#02000769)	102 S. Oak St. 41°14′18″N 103°39′36″W	Kimball	

=== Former listings ===
	Name on the Register	Image	Date listed	Date removed	Location	City or town	Description
1	Stone Building	Stone Building	March 31, 1983 (#83001097)	July 14, 2011	126 S. Chestnut St. 41°14′15″N 103°39′46″W	Kimball	Destroyed by fire January 2, 2010

== Logan County ==
There are no properties listed on the National Register of Historic Places in Logan County.

== Loup County ==
	Name on the Register	Image	Date listed	Location	City or town	Description
1	Pavillion Hotel	Pavillion Hotel	November 27, 1989 (#89002039)	Main St. Square; 41°46′17″N 99°22′46″W	Taylor	
2	Thomas and Mary Williams Homestead	Thomas and Mary Williams Homestead	December 31, 1998 (#98001565)	Approximately 0.5 miles east of Taylor, off a gravel road 41°45′53″N 99°22′22″W	Taylor	

== McPherson County ==
There are no properties listed on the National Register of Historic Places in McPherson County.

=== Former listing ===
	Name on the Register	Image	Date listed	Date removed	Location	City or town	Description
1	McPherson County Courthouse		July 5, 1990 (#90000970)	March 3, 2006	Junction of 6th and Anderson Sts.	Tryon	Damaged by a tornado on July 8, 2003 and subsequently demolished.

== Perkins County ==
	Name on the Register	Image	Date listed	Location	City or town	Description
1	Grant City Park	Grant City Park	February 16, 1996 (#96000066)	Bounded by Central Ave., 9th St., an alley line, and 8th St. 40°50′52″N 101°43′25″W	Grant	
2	Grant Commercial Historic District	Grant Commercial Historic District	February 16, 1996 (#96000025)	Roughly Central Ave. from 1st St. to 4th St. 40°50′28″N 101°43′29″W	Grant	
3	Perkins County Courthouse	Perkins County Courthouse	July 5, 1990 (#90000969)	Lincoln St. between 2nd and 3rd Sts. 40°50′29″N 101°43′37″W	Grant	
4	Venango Public School	Venango Public School	March 5, 2018 (#100002170)	201 E Washington St. 40°45′40″N 102°02′25″W	Venango	

== Phelps County ==
	Name on the Register	Image	Date listed	Location	City or town	Description
1	Brenstrom Farmstead	Brenstrom Farmstead	March 21, 2011 (#11000104)	10417 Westside Rd. 40°39′53″N 99°33′51″W	Overton	
2	CB&Q Holdrege Depot	CB&Q Holdrege Depot	February 21, 1997 (#97000131)	700 Ironhorse St. 40°26′09″N 99°22′14″W	Holdrege	
3	Farmers State Bank	Farmers State Bank	December 31, 2013 (#13001022)	307 Commercial St. 40°28′40″N 99°30′27″W	Loomis	
4	Kinner House	Kinner House	April 14, 2004 (#04000294)	515 Tibbals; 40°26′23″N 99°22′56″W	Holdrege	
5	Phelps County Courthouse	Phelps County Courthouse	January 10, 1990 (#89002242)	5th Ave. between East and West Aves. 40°26′22″N 99°22′12″W	Holdrege	

== Pierce County ==
	Name on the Register	Image	Date listed	Location	City or town	Description
1	Athletic Park Band Shell	Athletic Park Band Shell	November 12, 1992 (#92001573)	Northwestern corner of the junction of Harper and Main Sts. 42°21′15″N 97°47′34″W	Plainview	
2	Fremont, Elkhorn and Missouri Valley Railroad Depot	Fremont, Elkhorn and Missouri Valley Railroad Depot	November 16, 2005 (#05001291)	304 S. Main St. 42°20′53″N 97°47′36″W	Plainview	
3	Meridian Highway	Meridian Highway	November 29, 2001 (#01001273)	4.5 miles along county roads, following 552 Ave., 853 Rd., and 551 Ave. 42°10′43″N 97°29′28″W	Pierce	
4	Plainview Carnegie Library	Plainview Carnegie Library	February 25, 1993 (#93000056)	102 S. Main St. 42°21′02″N 97°47′36″W	Plainview	
5	Willow Creek Bridge	Willow Creek Bridge	June 29, 1992 (#92000706)	County road over Willow Creek, 6.5 miles south of Foster; 42°10′38″N 97°40′01″W	Foster	Bridge moved to Gilman Park in Pierce, Nebraska in 1994.

== Polk County ==
	Name on the Register	Image	Date listed	Location	City or town	Description
1	Clarks Site	Clarks Site	August 14, 1973 (#73001071)	Southwestern portion of Section 17, Township 14 North, Range 4 West; 41°10′48″N 97°48′09″W	Osceola	
2	Gov. John Hopwood Mickey House	Gov. John Hopwood Mickey House	May 12, 1977 (#77000835)	State St. 41°10′12″N 97°32′52″W	Osceola	
3	Charles H. Morrill Homestead	Charles H. Morrill Homestead	June 4, 1973 (#73001072)	0.5 miles southeast of Stromsburg on U.S. Route 81; 41°06′23″N 97°35′35″W	Stromsburg	
4	Polk County Courthouse	Polk County Courthouse	January 10, 1990 (#89002238)	Courthouse Sq. 41°10′49″N 97°32′48″W	Osceola	
5	Strickland Site		July 3, 1996 (#96000683)	Address Restricted	Silver Creek	
6	Victor E. Wilson House	Victor E. Wilson House	July 7, 1988 (#88000915)	518 Main St. 41°06′57″N 97°35′54″W	Stromsburg	

== Rock County ==
	Name on the Register	Image	Date listed	Location	City or town	Description
1	Ash Creek Ranch Barn	Ash Creek Ranch Barn	April 1, 2025 (#100011613)	889th Road; 42°42′46″N 99°17′33″W	Newport	
2	Bassett Lodge and Range Cafe	Bassett Lodge and Range Cafe	July 26, 2006 (#06000640)	205 Clark; 42°35′07″N 99°32′16″W	Bassett	
3	Carns State Aid Bridge	Carns State Aid Bridge	June 29, 1992 (#92000722)	County road over the Niobrara River, 10.8 miles northeast of Bassett; 42°44′01″N 99°28′52″W	Bassett	Extends into Keya Paha County
4	Rock County Courthouse	Rock County Courthouse	July 5, 1990 (#90000968)	State St. between Caroline and Bertha Sts. 42°34′58″N 99°32′07″W	Bassett	

== Sherman County ==
	Name on the Register	Image	Date listed	Location	City or town	Description
1	Archeological Site 25SM20		February 12, 2002 (#01001276)	Address Restricted	Loup City	
2	Frederick Hotel	Frederick Hotel	October 16, 2002 (#02000770)	810 O St. 41°16′30″N 98°58′07″W	Loup City	
3	Loup City Township Carnegie Library	Loup City Township Carnegie Library	December 27, 2007 (#07001326)	652 N St. 41°16′34″N 98°58′00″W	Loup City	
4	Sherman County Courthouse	Sherman County Courthouse	January 10, 1990 (#89002225)	630 O St. 41°16′31″N 98°57′58″W	Loup City	
5	Sweetwater Archeological Site	Sweetwater Archeological Site	July 29, 1974 (#74001141)	SW 1/4, section 35, township 13N, range 15W; 41°02′53″N 99°00′58″W	Sweetwater	

== Stanton County ==
	Name on the Register	Image	Date listed	Location	City or town	Description
1	Stanton Carnegie Library		November 5, 2018 (#100003095)	1009 Jackpine St. 41°57′05″N 97°13′29″W	Stanton	

== Thayer County ==
	Name on the Register	Image	Date listed	Location	City or town	Description
1	Richard E. Dill House	Richard E. Dill House	January 29, 1973 (#73001077)	Southwest corner, 6th and Mercy Streets; 40°14′53″N 97°23′19″W	Alexandria	
2	Site No. JF00-072	Site No. JF00-072	June 19, 1987 (#87001000)	Junction of Thayer, Jefferson, Washington, and Republic county lines 40°00′07″N 97°22′09″W	Hubbell Precinct	
3	US Post Office-Hebron	US Post Office-Hebron	May 11, 1992 (#92000473)	145 N. 5th St. 40°10′03″N 97°35′21″W	Hebron	One of 12 Nebraska post offices featuring a Section of Fine Arts mural, "Stampeding Buffalo Stopping a Train" (1939) by Eldora Lorenzini.

== Thomas County ==
	Name on the Register	Image	Date listed	Location	City or town	Description
1	Bessey Nursery	Bessey Nursery	May 24, 1978 (#78001715)	West of Halsey off Nebraska Highway 2; 41°54′02″N 100°18′26″W	Halsey	

=== Former listing ===
	Name on the Register	Image	Date listed	Date removed	Location	City or town	Description
1	Thomas County Courthouse		July 5, 1990 (#90000971)	July 3, 2007	503 Main Street	Thedford	Demolished in 2006.

== Thurston County ==
	Name on the Register	Image	Date listed	Location	City or town	Description
1	Blackbird Hill	Blackbird Hill	May 2, 1979 (#79001456)	Off U.S. Route 75 southeast of Macy; 42°04′48″N 96°17′55″W	Anderson Township	Traditional burial site of Omaha chiefs, including Blackbird
2	First Thurston County Courthouse	First Thurston County Courthouse	January 10, 1990 (#89002210)	400-412 Main St. 42°06′51″N 96°42′26″W	Pender	
3	Hensley Spring		November 7, 2022 (#100008364)	Address Restricted	Winnebago vicinity	
4	Highway 75 Spring		November 7, 2022 (#100008365)	Address Restricted	Winnebago vicinity	
5	Dr. Susan Picotte Memorial Hospital	Dr. Susan Picotte Memorial Hospital	December 16, 1988 (#88002762)	505 Matthewson St. 42°09′06″N 96°29′41″W	Walthill	
6	Susan La Flesche Picotte House	Susan La Flesche Picotte House	November 10, 2009 (#09000905)	100 S. Taft St. 42°08′49″N 96°29′33″W	Walthill	
7	Sampson Spring		November 7, 2022 (#100008366)	Address Restricted	Winnebago vicinity	
8	Thurston County Courthouse	Thurston County Courthouse	January 10, 1990 (#89002209)	Main St. between 5th and 6th Sts. 42°06′49″N 96°42′32″W	Pender	

=== Former listings ===
	Name on the Register	Image	Date listed	Date removed	Location	City or town	Description
1	North Omaha Creek Bridge	North Omaha Creek Bridge	June 29, 1992 (#92000727)	March 25, 2019	Township road over the North Omaha Creek, 3 miles southwest of Winnebago; 42°11′38″N 96°31′50″W	Winnebago	Apparently no longer extant

== Wayne County ==
	Name on the Register	Image	Date listed	Location	City or town	Description
1	Wayne Commercial Historic District	Wayne Commercial Historic District	December 8, 2009 (#09001071)	S. Main, N. Main, and 2nd St. 42°13′49″N 97°01′04″W	Wayne	
2	Wayne County Courthouse	Wayne County Courthouse	May 2, 1979 (#79001458)	510 Pearl St. 42°14′03″N 97°01′11″W	Wayne	
3	Wayne Municipal Auditorium	Wayne Municipal Auditorium	March 28, 2002 (#02000273)	222 N. Pearl St. 42°13′52″N 97°01′10″W	Wayne	
4	Wayne United States Post Office	Wayne United States Post Office	December 27, 2007 (#07001325)	120 Pearl St. 42°13′48″N 97°01′09″W	Wayne	
5	Dr. W.C. Wightman House	Dr. W.C. Wightman House	June 13, 1978 (#78001717)	702 Lincoln St. 42°14′09″N 97°01′15″W	Wayne	

== Wheeler County ==
	Name on the Register	Image	Date listed	Location	City or town	Description
1	A.T. Ranch Headquarters	A.T. Ranch Headquarters	May 2, 1990 (#90000565)	Star Route 1; 41°56′52″N 98°29′58″W	Bartlett	
2	Former Wheeler County Courthouse	Former Wheeler County Courthouse	January 10, 1990 (#89002215)	Main St. between 2nd and 3rd Sts. 41°53′03″N 98°33′06″W	Bartlett	

== York County ==
	Name on the Register	Image	Date listed	Location	City or town	Description
1	Bradshaw Town Hall	Bradshaw Town Hall	May 31, 1984 (#84002499)	Off U.S. Route 34; 40°53′01″N 97°44′48″W	Bradshaw	
2	Clem's Opera House	Clem's Opera House	September 28, 1988 (#88000949)	Main and Post Sts. 41°01′41″N 97°24′07″W	Gresham	
3	Crossing the Plains	Crossing the Plains	July 7, 2026 (#100012970)	York Rest Area Westbound. Interstate 80, MM 355.23; 40°49′21″N 97°33′26″W	York	
4	W.S. Jeffery Farmstead	W.S. Jeffery Farmstead	July 26, 1982 (#82003208)	West of Benedict; 40°59′57″N 97°41′26″W	Benedict	
5	York Auditorium	York Auditorium	March 3, 2023 (#100008681)	612 Nebraska Ave. 40°52′02″N 97°35′26″W	York	
6	York Public Library	York Public Library	December 4, 1990 (#90001765)	306 E. 7th St. 40°52′04″N 97°35′24″W	York	
7	York Subway	York Subway	June 29, 1992 (#92000772)	14th and 15th Sts. and BNSF tracks over U.S. Route 81; 40°52′27″N 97°35′34″W	York	

=== Former listings ===
	Name on the Register	Image	Date listed	Date removed	Location	City or town	Description
1	York County Courthouse		December 6, 1975 (#75001103)	June 5, 1978	5th St. and Lincoln Ave.	York	Demolished in 1978.

== See also ==
- List of National Historic Landmarks in Nebraska
