= W.S. Jeffery Farmstead =

- W. S. Jeffery Farmstead
- U.S. National Register of Historic Places
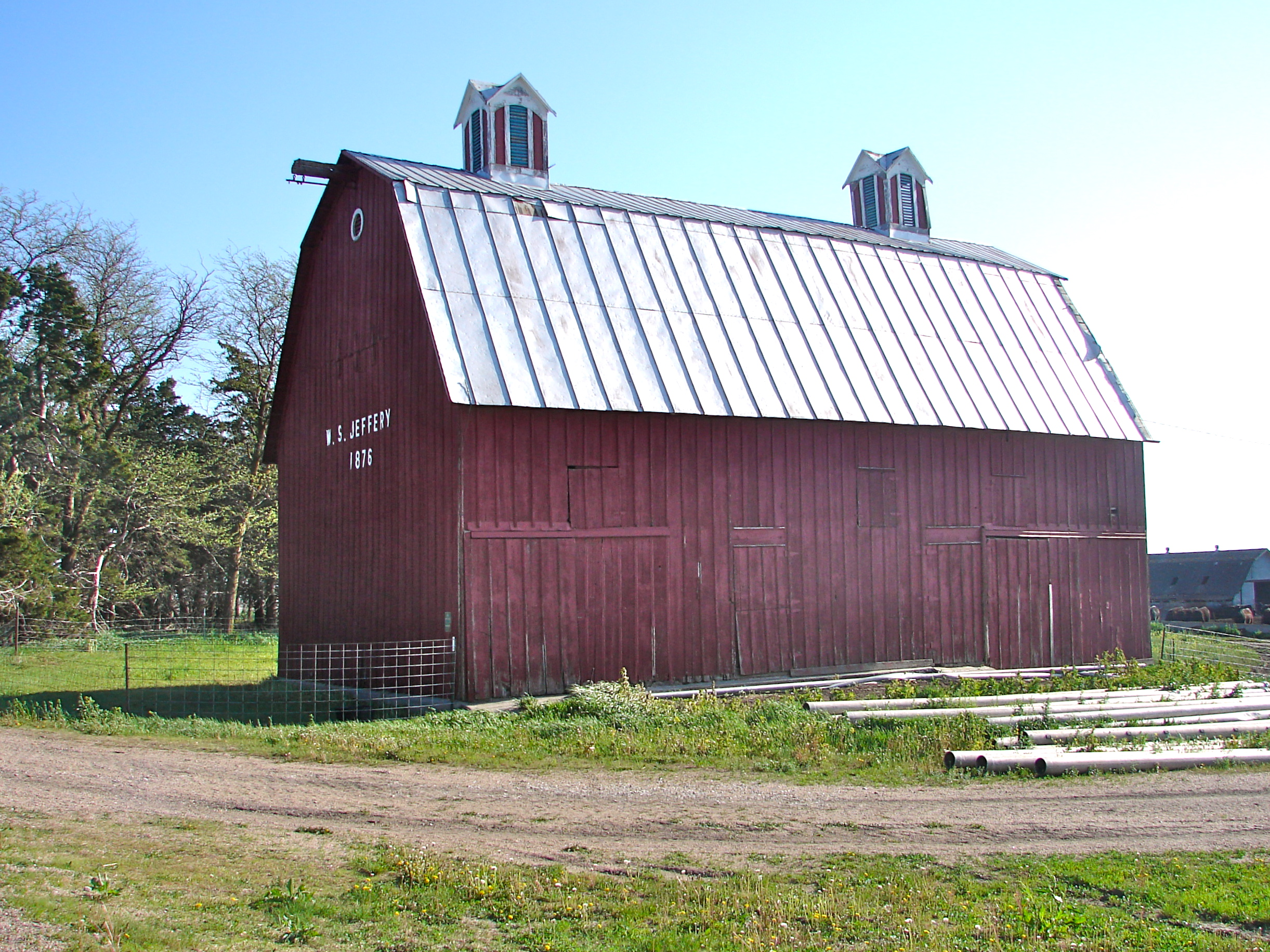
- The barn in 2011

- Location within Nebraska Location within the United States
- Nearest city: Benedict, Nebraska
- Coordinates: 40°59′57″N 97°41′26″W
- Area: 360 acres (150 ha)
- Built: 1878
- Architectural style: Queen Anne
- NRHP reference No.: 82003208
- Added to NRHP: July 26, 1982

The W.S. Jeffery Farmstead is a historic estate with a farm house, a barn and several outbuildings in Benedict, Nebraska. The farm was established in 1878, and the barn was built in 1879–1880, followed by a farm house designed in the Queen Anne architectural style, built in 1900–1902. They were built for William Scott Jeffery, a settler from Pennsylvania who became a farmer in Illinois in the 1860s before moving to Nebraska a decade later. Jeffery lived here with his wife, née Laura Dickey, their three sons, Basil, Earl and Orman, and their daughter, Leona Idilla. The family spent their winters in another house in Lincoln. One of their sons, Orman Schuyler Jeffery, lived on the farm until his death in 1951. It remained in the Jeffery family in the 1980s. The property has been listed on the National Register of Historic Places since July 26, 1982.
