= Kilgore Memorial Library =

Public library in York, Nebraska, U.S.

- 40.86655552009478°N 97.59002672615738°W
- Location: 520 N Nebraska Ave., York, Nebraska, U.S.
- Type: Public library
- Established: 1986; 40 years ago

Collection
- Size: 55,576

Access and use
- Population served: 4,766 registered users

Other information
- Website: yorklibrary.org

Kilgore Memorial Library is a public library in York, Nebraska, United States. The library was established in 1986 following four years of development. The library replaced the former York Public Library, which was built from 1901 to 1902 and was added to the National Register of Historic Places in December 1990.

== History ==
- York Public Library
- U.S. National Register of Historic Places
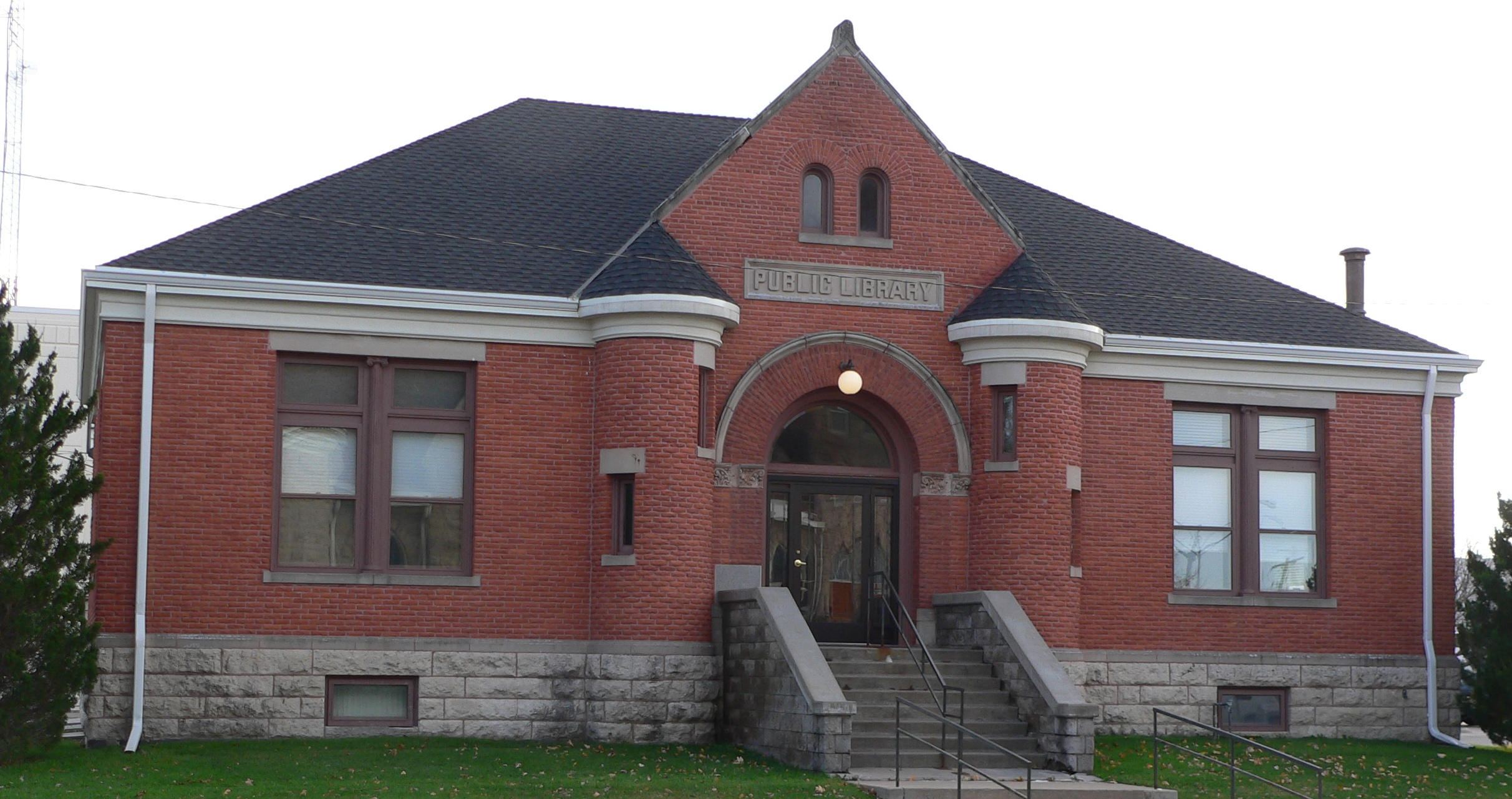
- York Public Library in 2009
- Location: 306 East Seventh Street, York, Nebraska
- Coordinates: 40°52′04″N 97°35′24″W
- Built: 1901
- Architect: Morrison H. Vail
- Architectural style: Romanesque
- NRHP reference No.: 90001765
- Added to NRHP: December 4, 1990

=== York Public Library ===
York Public Library was originally announced in 1901 following a donation from Lyndia Woods, allowing for the creation of the library. The library opened in December 1902. Following the opening of Kilgore Memorial Library in 1986, the library closed and was converted into office space. The library was later added to the National Register of Historic Places on December 4, 1990.

=== Kilgore Memorial Library ===
Kilgore Memorial Library was announced in 1982, following the death of its namesake, Dr. William S. Kilgore. Kilgore was a former physician who left $1 million for the library's construction. Following four years of development, Kilgore Memorial Library officially opened on September 14, 1986.

== Architecture ==
The original York Public Library was designed in the Romanesque Revival style by architect Morrison H. Vail.
