= Streeter–Peterson House =

Historic house in Nebraska, United States

- Streeter-Peterson House
- U.S. National Register of Historic Places
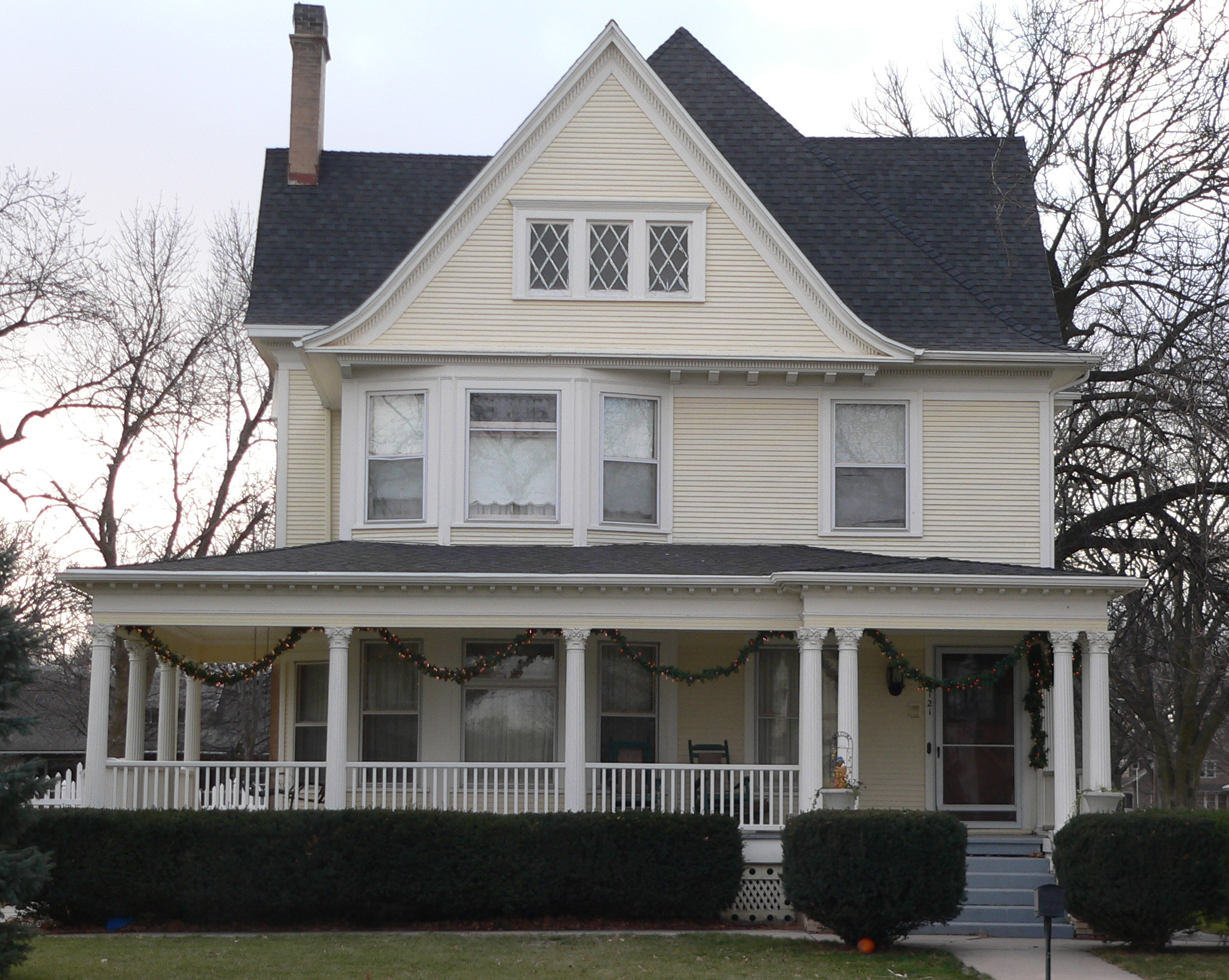

- Location within Nebraska Location within the United States
- Location: 1121 9th Street, Aurora, Nebraska
- Coordinates: 40°52′5″N 98°0′24″W
- Area: less than one acre
- Built: 1900
- Built by: Johnson & Henthorn
- Architectural style: Queen Anne
- NRHP reference No.: 91001754
- Added to NRHP: November 29, 1991

The Streeter–Peterson House, located at 1121 9th St. in Aurora, Nebraska, was built in 1900 by local builders Johnson & Henthorn. It is designed in "classical" Queen Anne style. It was listed on the National Register of Historic Places in 1991; the listing included two contributing buildings.

The home was built for the family William H. Streeter, a founding personage in the banking field of the area, and was later owned by A. Einer Peterson, a successful merchant to the fields of education and medicine.

It was deemed significant as "a significant local example of early twentieth century Neoclassical Queen Anne domestic architecture in Aurora, Nebraska". It was evaluated to be "the most impressive and architecturally sophisticated" of comparables in Aurora.
