= Wheat Growers Hotel =

- U.S. National Register of Historic Places
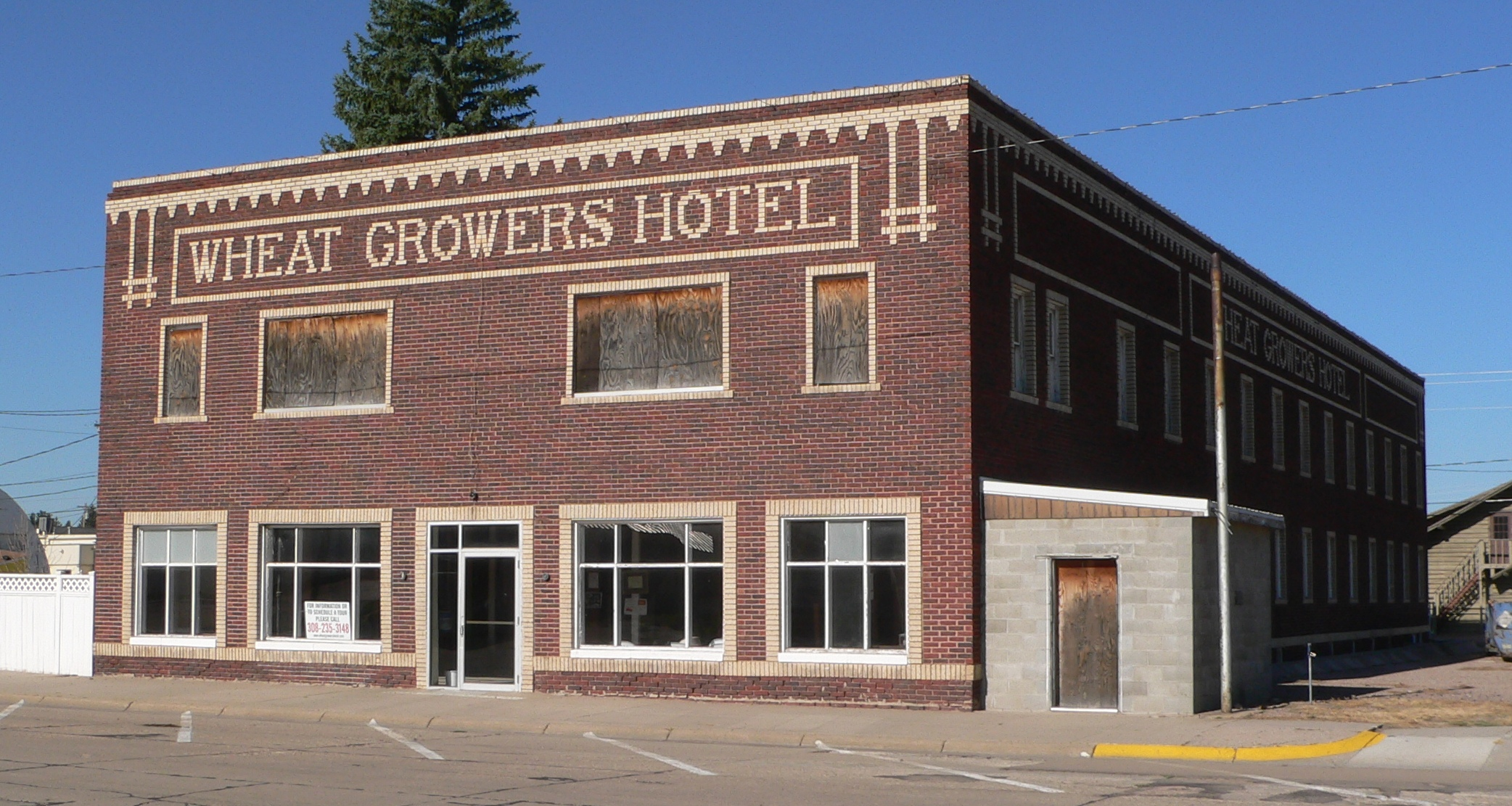
- Building in 2010

- Location within Nebraska Location within the United States
- Location: 102 S. Oak St., Kimball, Nebraska
- Coordinates: 41°14′17″N 103°39′37.6″W
- Area: less than one acre
- Built: 1918
- Architectural style: Early Commercial
- NRHP reference No.: 02000769
- Added to NRHP: July 11, 2002

The Wheat Growers Hotel, at 102 S. Oak St. in Kimball, Nebraska, is a historic hotel that was built in Early Commercial style in 1918. It was the largest hotel built in Kimball. It benefited from Union Pacific railway line expansion and the Lincoln Highway running through Kimball.

The hotel has a wheat theme reflected in decorative elements of its building which "celebrates an important facet of the commercial and economic development of the city and county." It was listed on the National Register of Historic Places in 2002, at which time it was vacant.

In its NRHP nomination it was asserted to be significant "as an important resource in the commercial and economic development in the city of Kimball" and "as a good example of early twentieth-century commercial hotel design with good integrity."
