= Former Wheeler County Courthouse =

- U.S. National Register of Historic Places
- U.S. Historic district
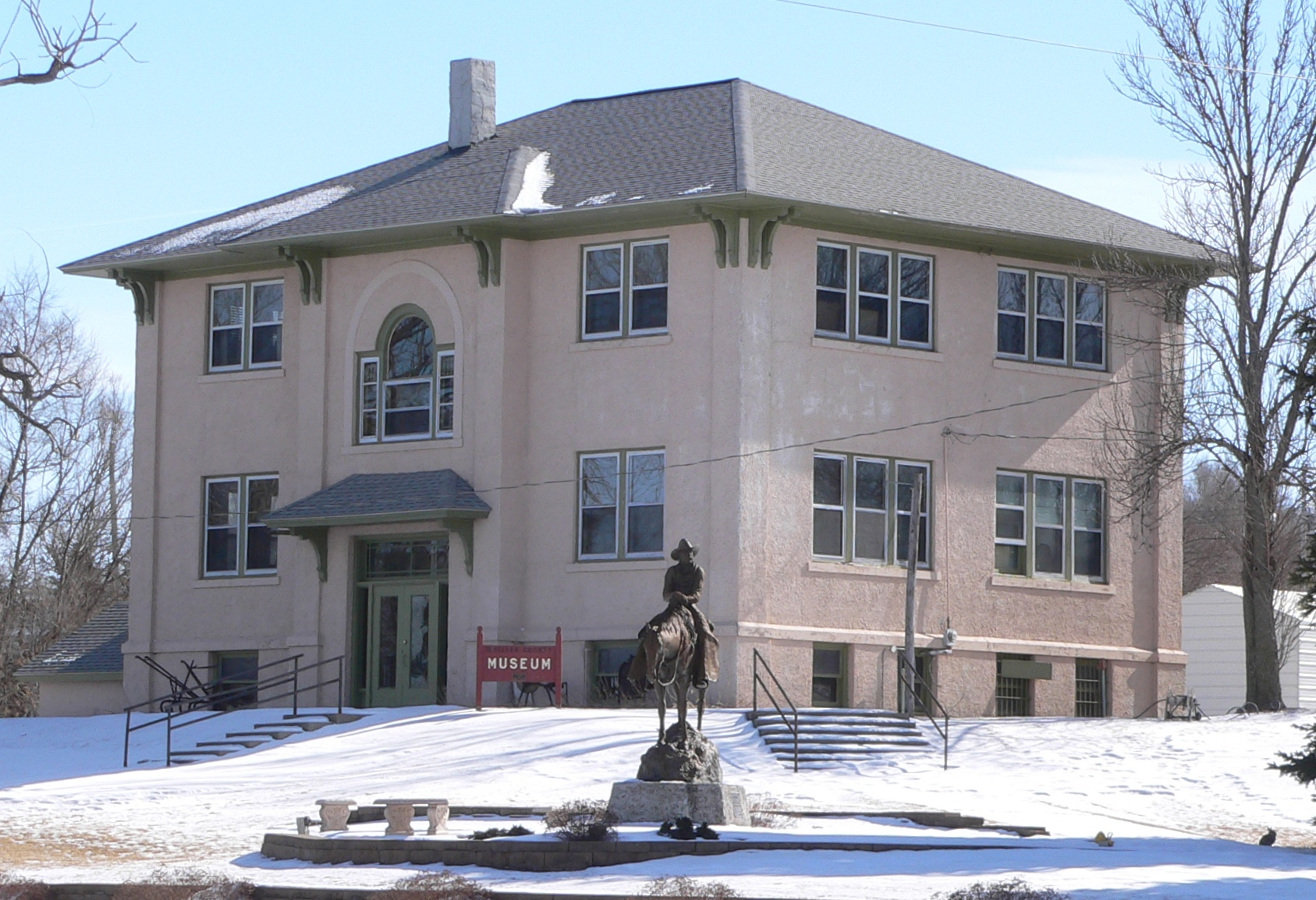

- Location within Nebraska Location within the United States
- Location: Main St. between 2nd and 3rd Sts., Bartlett, Nebraska
- Coordinates: 41.884167°N 98.551667°W
- Area: 1.5 acres (0.61 ha)
- Built: 1918
- Architect: Sidney H. Foster
- Architectural style: Mission/Spanish Revival
- MPS: County Courthouses of Nebraska MPS
- NRHP reference No.: 89002215
- Added to NRHP: January 10, 1990

The Former Wheeler County Courthouse in Bartlett, Nebraska was built in 1918. It was listed on the National Register of Historic Places in 1990.

It has elements of Mission Revival style, and was in fact the only known courthouse in Nebraska of that style. It has a hipped roof with a broad overhang, which was originally of red tiles. Other elements of Mission Revival style include the building's "massing, materials, simplicity of form, broad eaves, and long slender pairs of brackets. The brackets adorn pilasters at the corners and also the entrance." Another feature is a Palladian window over the front entrance.

The former district courtroom is on the second floor.

In 1989, the former courthouse was in use as a museum by the Wheeler County Historical Society "to commemorate county government and pioneer life in Wheeler County." The present courthouse of Wheeler County was built adjacent.
