= Ben Bonderson Farm =

- U.S. National Register of Historic Places
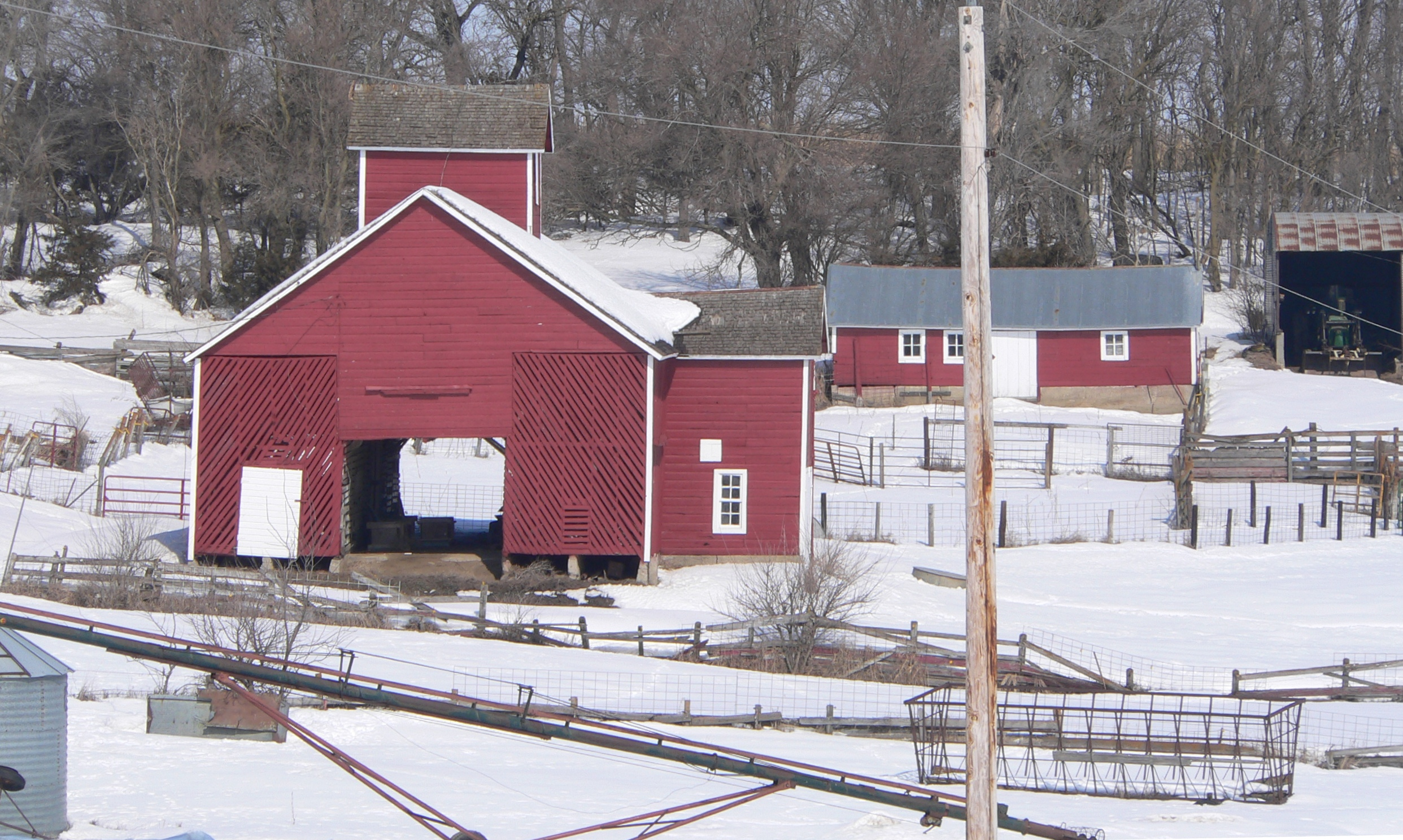

- Location within Nebraska Location within the United States
- Location: 1541 270th St., Emerson, Nebraska
- Coordinates: 42.279167°N 96.641667°W
- Area: 20 acres (8.1 ha)
- Built: 1883, 1895, 1909
- Built by: Wigle, Jesse; Bonderson, Ben
- NRHP reference No.: 06000993
- Added to NRHP: November 8, 2006

The Ben Bonderson Farm was established by 1883. It was listed on the National Register of Historic Places in 2006.

It included eight contributing buildings and two contributing structures.

The farmhouse of the property is a large white building built in three phases, in 1883, 1895, and 1909. The central portion was built in 1883.

The property has a drive-in T-shaped crib barn which was built in 1915, a brooder house, a wash house, and a chicken house. The property has a gabled granary and a hay barn.

A horse barn once existed but collapsed and was removed.

The original house was built by early settler Jesse Wiggle, who sold the property in 1891 to Swedish-born Ben Bonderson (1862–1943) for $12.00 per acre. Hilda Peterson (1875–1968), born in Sweden, married Bonderson in 1895. The two raised six children while living and working on the farm.

It is a well-preserved family farm with eight buildings and two structures dating back to 1883.
