= Petersburg Jail =

- U.S. National Register of Historic Places
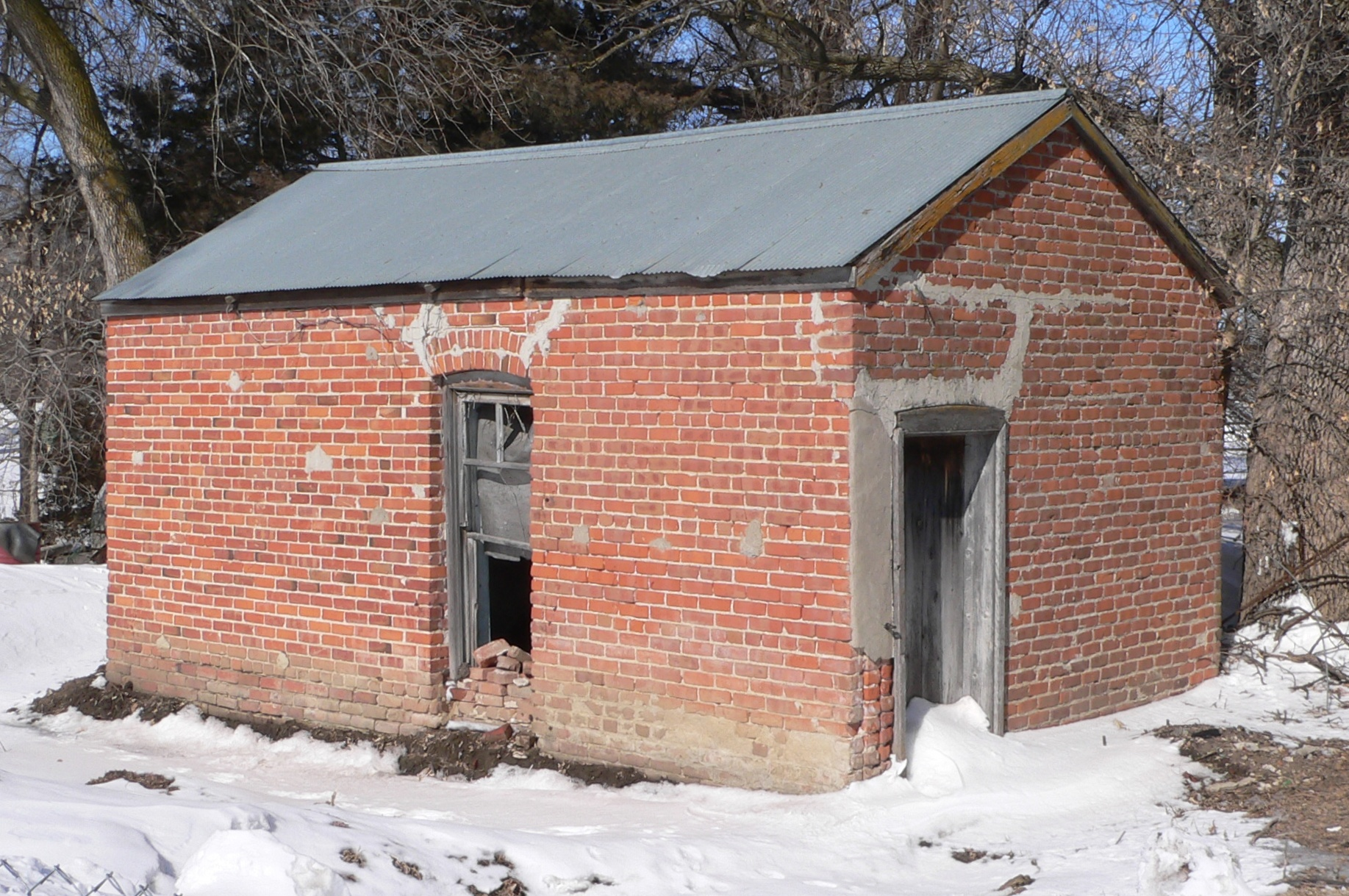

- Location within Nebraska Location within the United States
- Location: Main St. and Second St., Petersburg, Nebraska
- Coordinates: 41.854139°N 98.079821°W
- Area: less than one acre
- Built: 1902
- NRHP reference No.: 05000154
- Added to NRHP: March 15, 2005

The Petersburg Jail, at Main St. and 2nd St. in Petersburg in Boone County, Nebraska, was built in 1902 and was Petersburg's first freestanding municipal structure. It was listed on the National Register of Historic Places in 2005.

== Description ==
It is a 24 by 16 feet (7.3 by 4.9 m) brick structure.

== History ==
It originally was a single room, then was split by metal bars in 1926 to separate a jail cell from a marshal's desk space; the bars have since been removed.
