= Miller Hotel =

- U.S. National Register of Historic Places
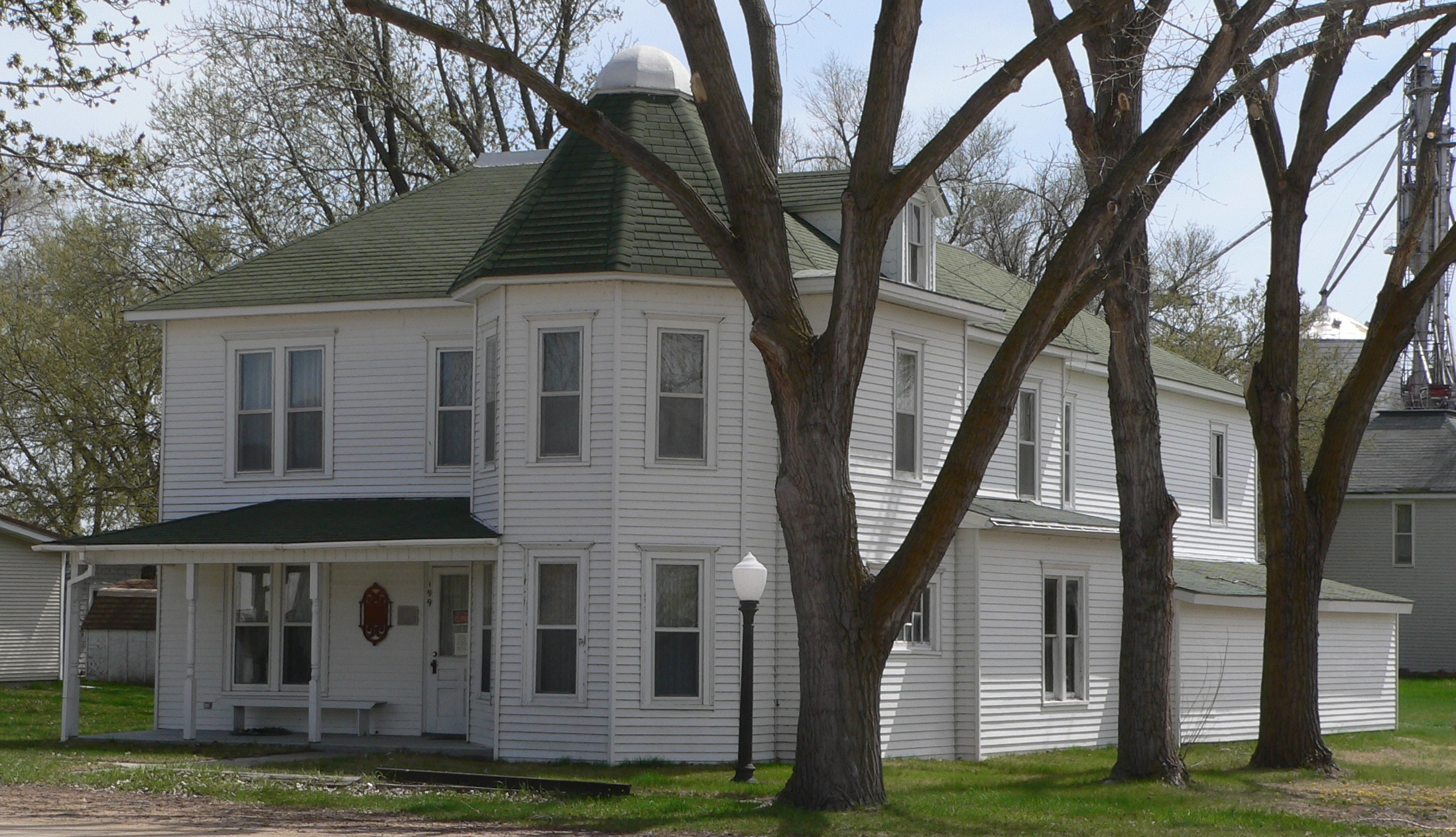

- Location within Nebraska Location within the United States
- Location: 197 W. Third St., Long Pine, Nebraska
- Coordinates: 42°32′2″N 99°42′5″W
- Area: less than one acre
- Built: 1895
- Architectural style: Queen Anne
- NRHP reference No.: 89002041
- Added to NRHP: November 27, 1989

The Miller Hotel, located at 197 W. Third St. in Long Pine, Nebraska, was built in 1895 as a single family house and was expanded into a hotel in 1914. As of 1989, when it was listed on the National Register of Historic Places, it was the only hotel building surviving in Long Pine, out of 10 known to have existed. It became the only historic site in Brown County, Nebraska to be listed on the National Register.

It was deemed significant "on a regional level...for its association with the commercial development of Long Pine and with the building boom of second generation hotels that occurred on a statewide basis during the first quarter of the twentieth century" and on a statewide level "as an extraordinarily well preserved relict example of the Longitudinal Block hotel". The Miller Hotel was not, however, typical of the "modern" hotels of its era, in that it was not built from brick, was created by the expansion and conversion of a single-family dwelling, and lacked modern features such as private telephones and hot and cold water in its individual rooms.

It includes Queen Anne style architecture in the United States and has also been known as Luehrs Rooming House and BW04-001.

It was bought in 1984 by a local historical society, the Long Pine Heritage Society, which intended to preserve the building and open it as a local history museum. It serves that function in 2013.

It was listed on the National Register of Historic Places in 1989.
