= Hotel DeFair =

- U.S. National Register of Historic Places
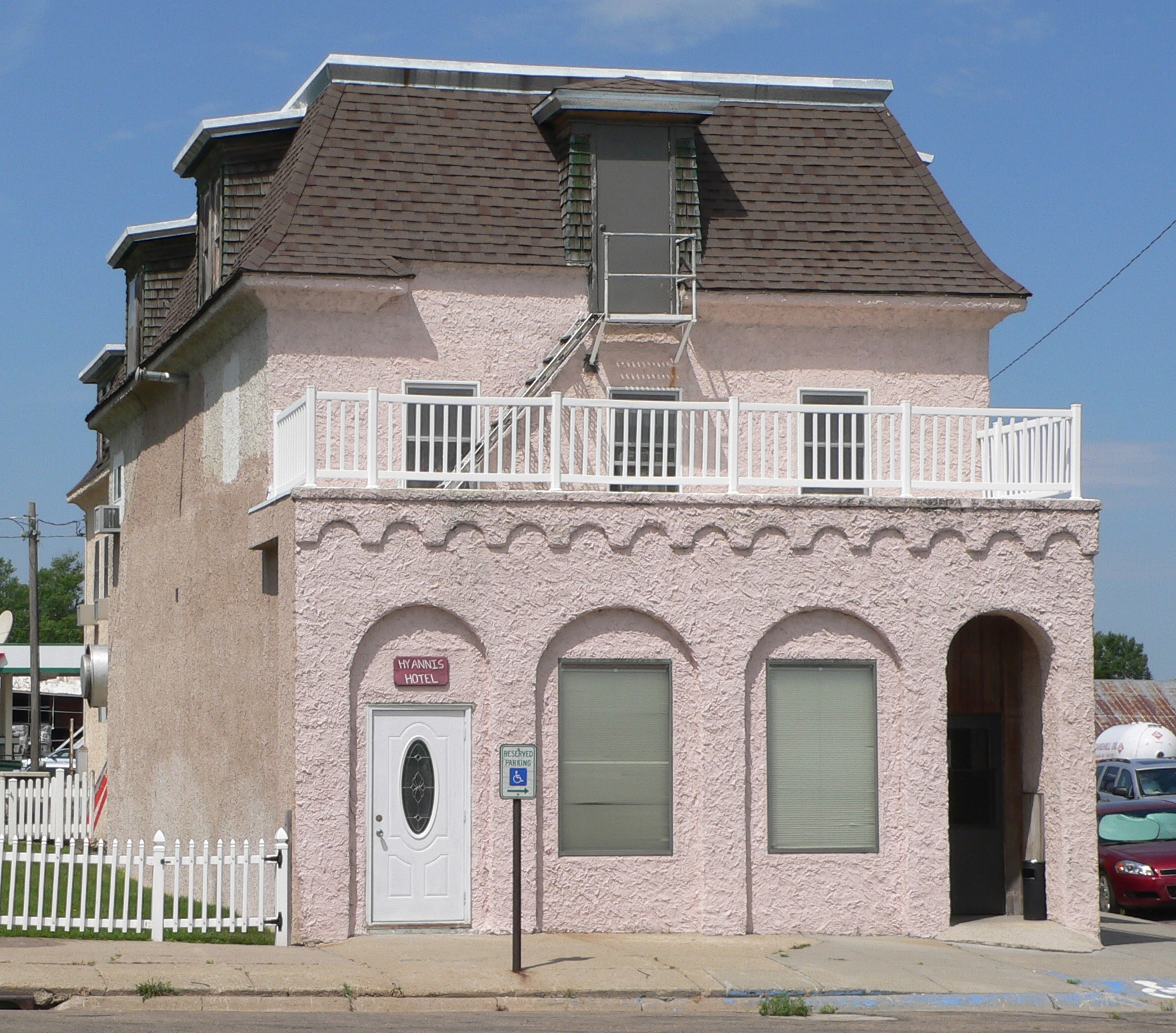

- Location within Nebraska Location within the United States
- Location: NE 2 and Main St., Hyannis, Nebraska
- Coordinates: 42°0′3″N 101°45′43″W
- Area: less than one acre
- Built: 1898
- Built by: Sears, S.S.
- Architectural style: Greek Revival, Second Empire
- NRHP reference No.: 76001132
- Added to NRHP: October 29, 1976

The Hotel DeFair, at NE 2 and Main St. in Hyannis, Nebraska, and also known as the Hyannis Hotel, was built in 1898 and is listed on the National Register of Historic Places (NRHP). According to its NRHP nomination, it once was considered to be the best hotel and restaurant in western Nebraska.

The building design includes Greek Revival and Second Empire architectural elements.

The hotel was listed on the National Register of Historic Places in 1976.
