= Garfield County Frontier Fairgrounds =

- U.S. National Register of Historic Places
- U.S. Historic district
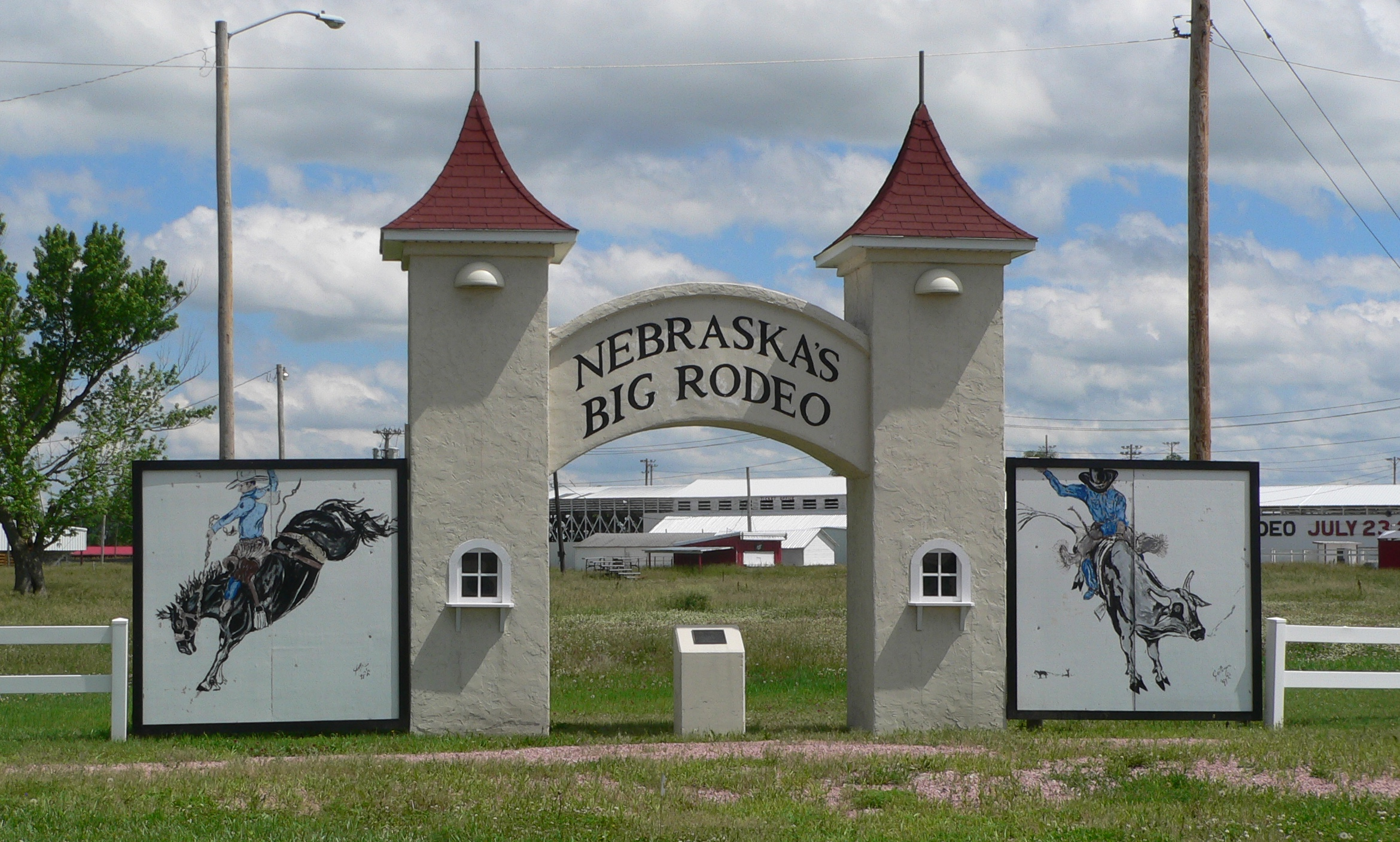

- Location within Nebraska Location within the United States
- Location: Off Nebraska Highway 91
- Nearest city: Burwell, Nebraska
- Coordinates: 41°46′31″N 99°07′23″W
- Area: 40 acres (16 ha)
- Built: 1922
- NRHP reference No.: 85001005
- Added to NRHP: May 9, 1985

The Garfield County Frontier Fairgrounds, near Burwell, Nebraska, also known as Burwell Rodeo Ground, is a historic property with significance dating to 1922. A 40-acre (16 ha) area was listed as a historic district on the U.S. National Register of Historic Places in 1985. The listing included 13 contributing buildings and seven other contributing structures.

By the mid-1980s, it was Nebraska's oldest rodeo venue in which the original buildings were still being used for their original purposes.
