= Maginnis Irrigation Aqueduct =

- U.S. National Register of Historic Places
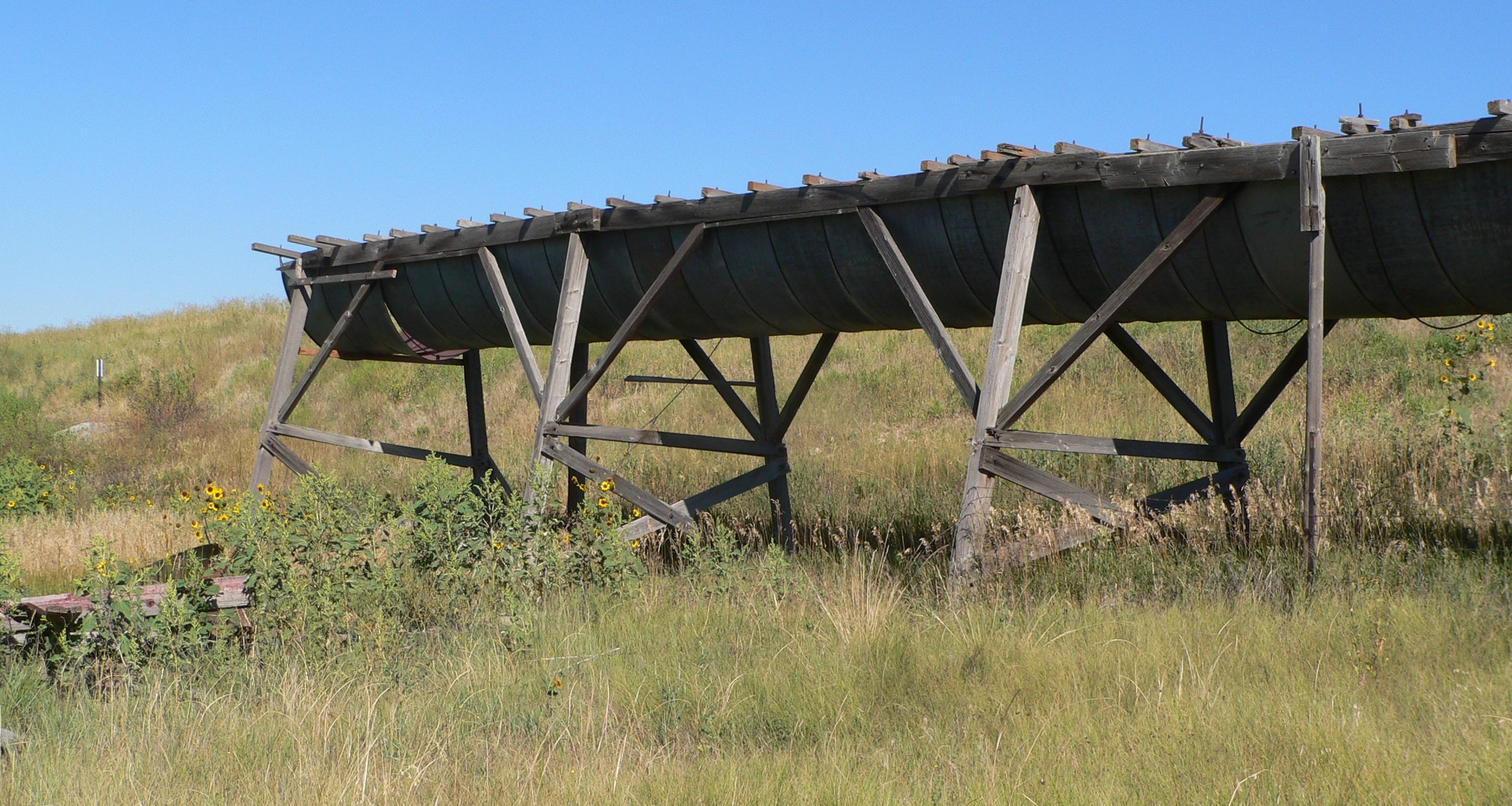

- Location within Nebraska Location within the United States
- Nearest city: Kimball, Nebraska
- Coordinates: 41°13′45″N 103°46′40″W
- Area: less than one acre
- Built: 1912
- Built by: Maginnis, Patrick
- NRHP reference No.: 94001231
- Added to NRHP: October 21, 1994

The Maginnis Irrigation Aqueduct, in rural Kimball County, Nebraska about five miles from Kimball, was built in 1912 by Patrick Maginnis. It consists of a woodend trestle supporting a galvanized steel flume, about 55-metre (180 ft) long and about 4.5-metre (15 ft) in maximum height. It was part of the Bay State Irrigation Canal.

It was listed on the National Register of Historic Places in 1994. It was deemed significant for association with irrigation and agriculture in the state and "as an excellent example of a structure designed to overcome a topographical obstruction", namely a draw of Lodgepole Creek. In 1994, it was "the best preserved and most visible" of several surviving aqueduct sections in the area.
