= Alma City Auditorium and Sale Barn =

- U.S. National Register of Historic Places
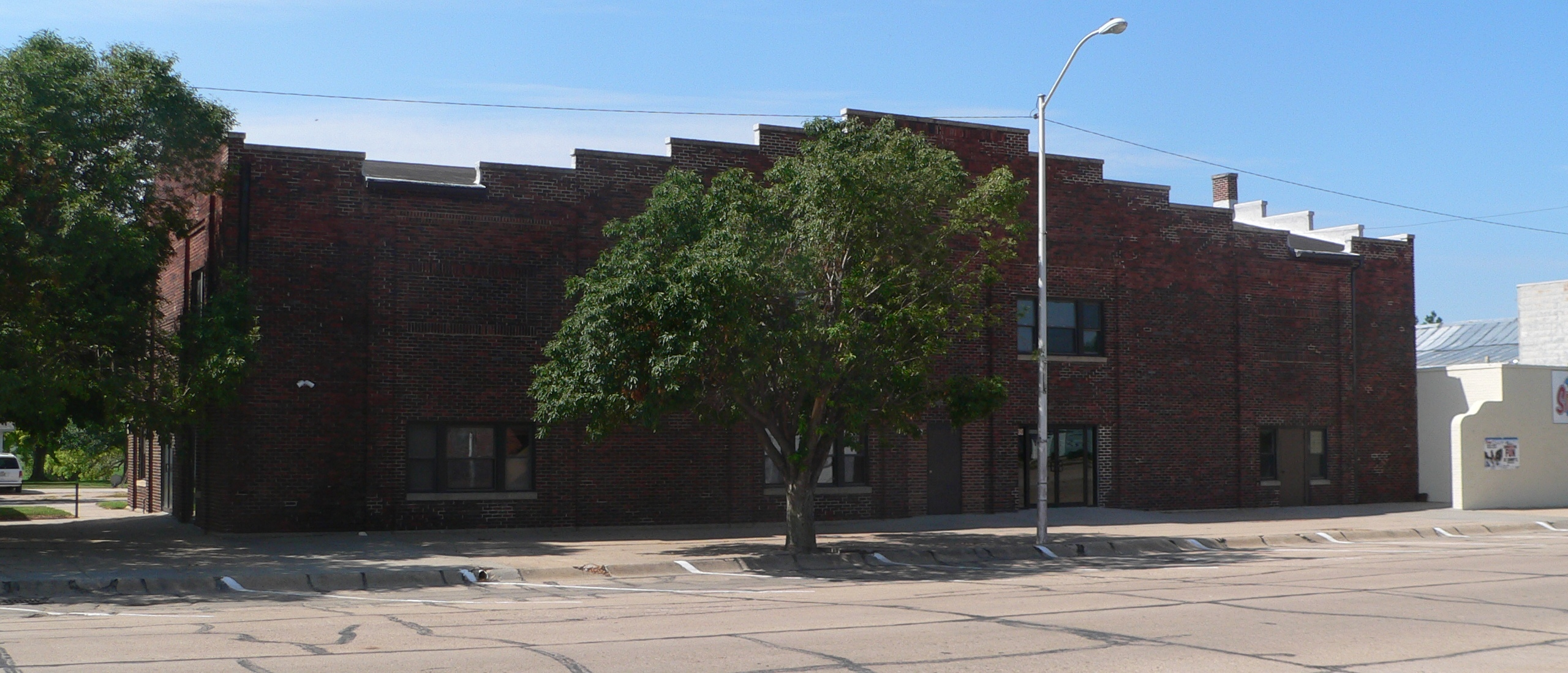
- The building in 2014

- Location within Nebraska Location within the United States
- Location: 614 Main Street, Alma, Nebraska
- Coordinates: 40°05′50″N 99°21′50″W
- Built: 1884
- NRHP reference No.: 14000395
- Added to NRHP: July 11, 2014

The Alma City Auditorium and Sale Barn is a historic building in Alma, Nebraska. It was built in 1922–1923. It was used to sell cattle and to host events, like the Harlan County Music Festival in 1948. The 1938 funeral of Ashton C. Shallenberger, who served as the 15th governor of Nebraska from 1909 to 1911, was also held here. The building was listed on the National Register of Historic Places in 2014.
