= City of Alliance Central Park Fountain =

- U.S. National Register of Historic Places
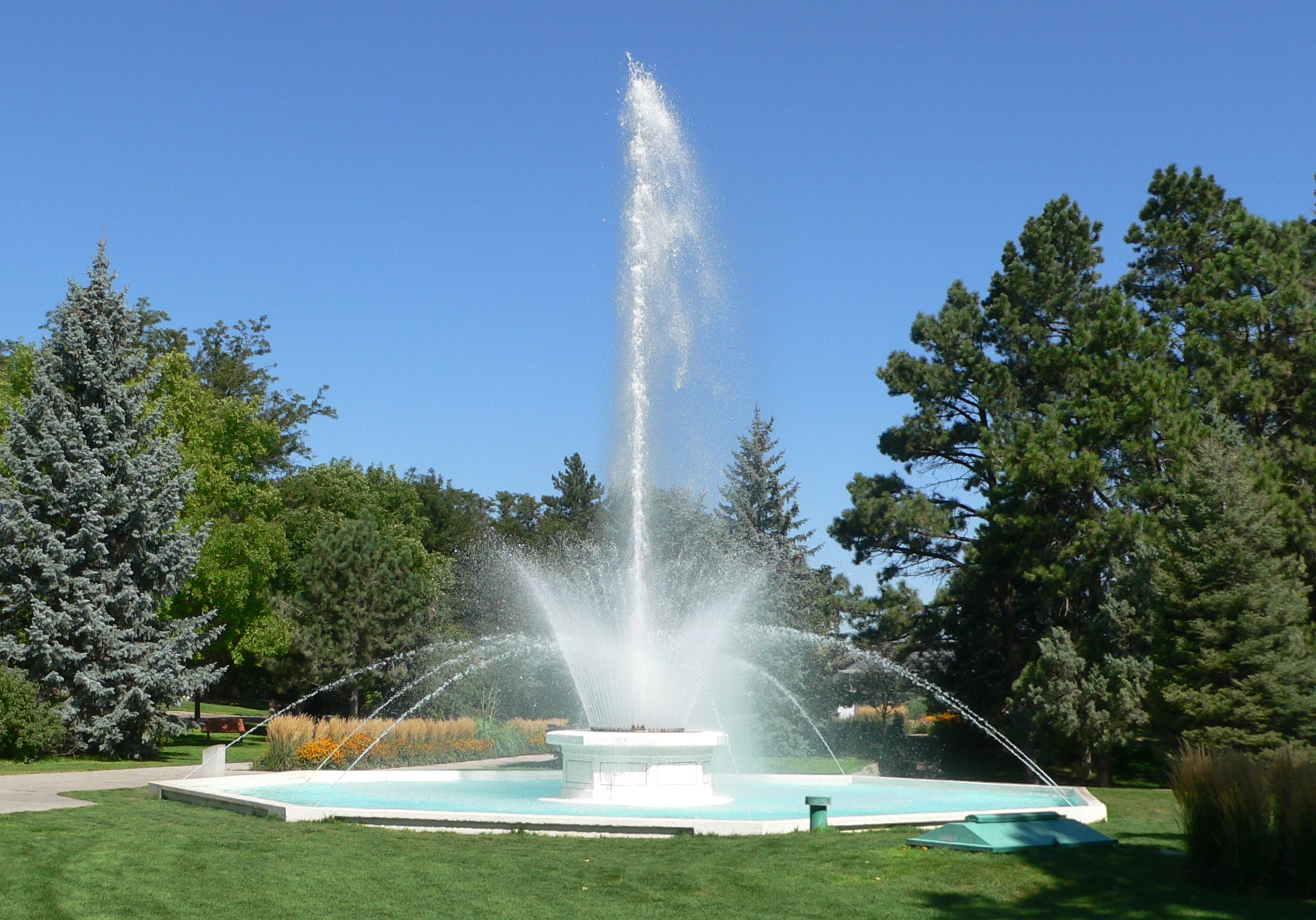
- Fountain in 2010

- Location within Nebraska Location within the United States
- Location: Junction of 10th St. and Niobrara Ave., Alliance, Nebraska
- Coordinates: 42°6′17″N 102°52′8″W
- Area: less than one acre
- Built: 1935
- NRHP reference No.: 90001772
- Added to NRHP: November 28, 1990

The City of Alliance Central Park Fountain, located at 10th St. and Niobrara Ave. in Alliance, Nebraska, was built in 1935 by Civilian Conservation Corps workers. In 1935, it was spectacular, having colored lights and timers. It was completed in time for "Stampede Days" of June, 1935, in Alliance.

It was listed on the National Register of Historic Places in 1990. It was deemed locally significant "in the area of engineering as an excellent example of an electrically powered, colored-light fountain produced during the 1930s by a nationally recognized manufacturer, General Electric." Twenty thousand dollars was raised for its renovation in 1988.
