= J. M. Daniel House and School =

Historic buildings in Nebraska, United States

- J. M. Daniel House
- U.S. National Register of Historic Places
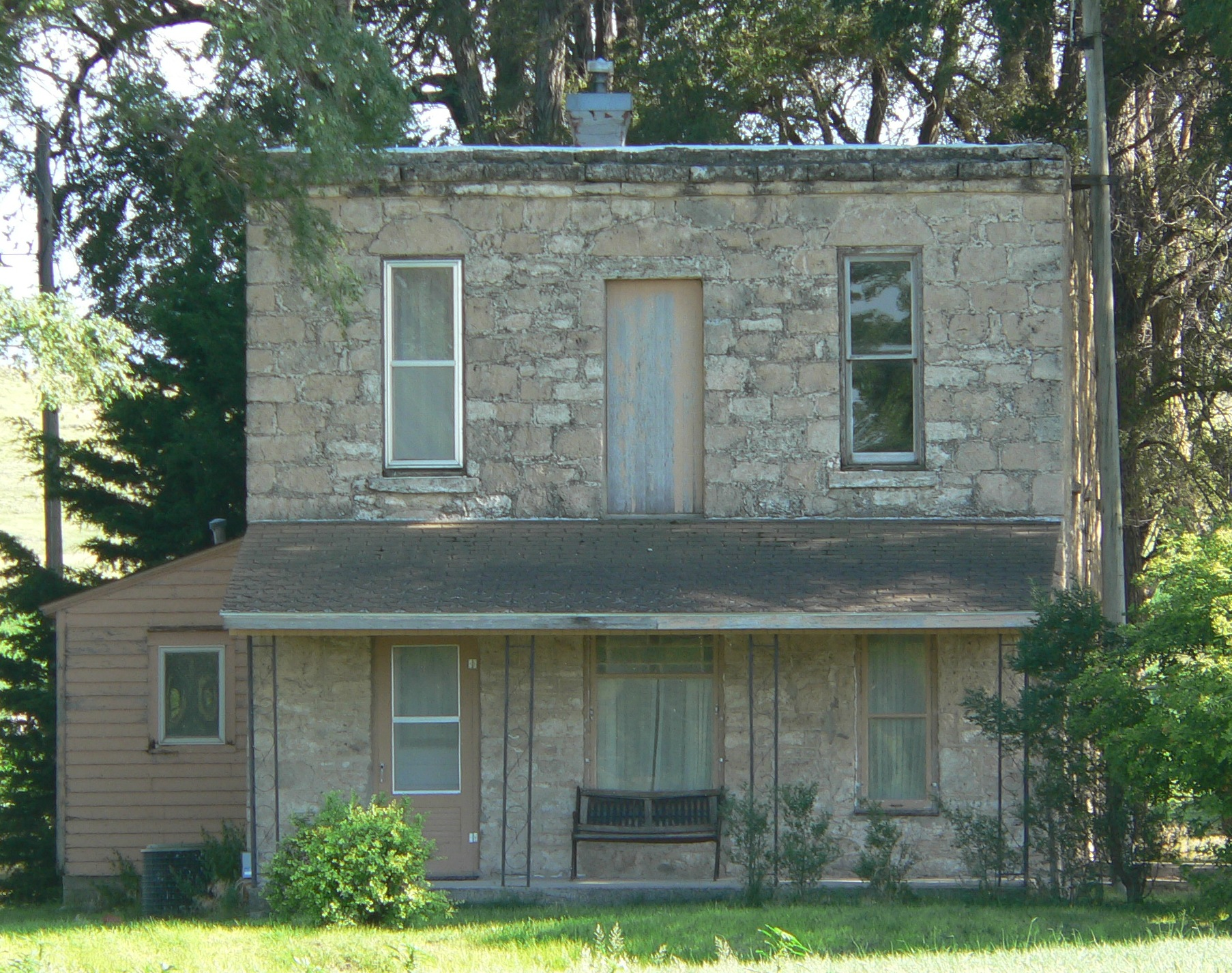
- Nearest city: Hamlet, Nebraska
- Area: less than one acre
- Built: 1876
- Built by: Daniel, John M.
- NRHP reference No.: 85001169
- Added to NRHP: May 30, 1985

- J. M. Daniel School-District #3
- U.S. National Register of Historic Places
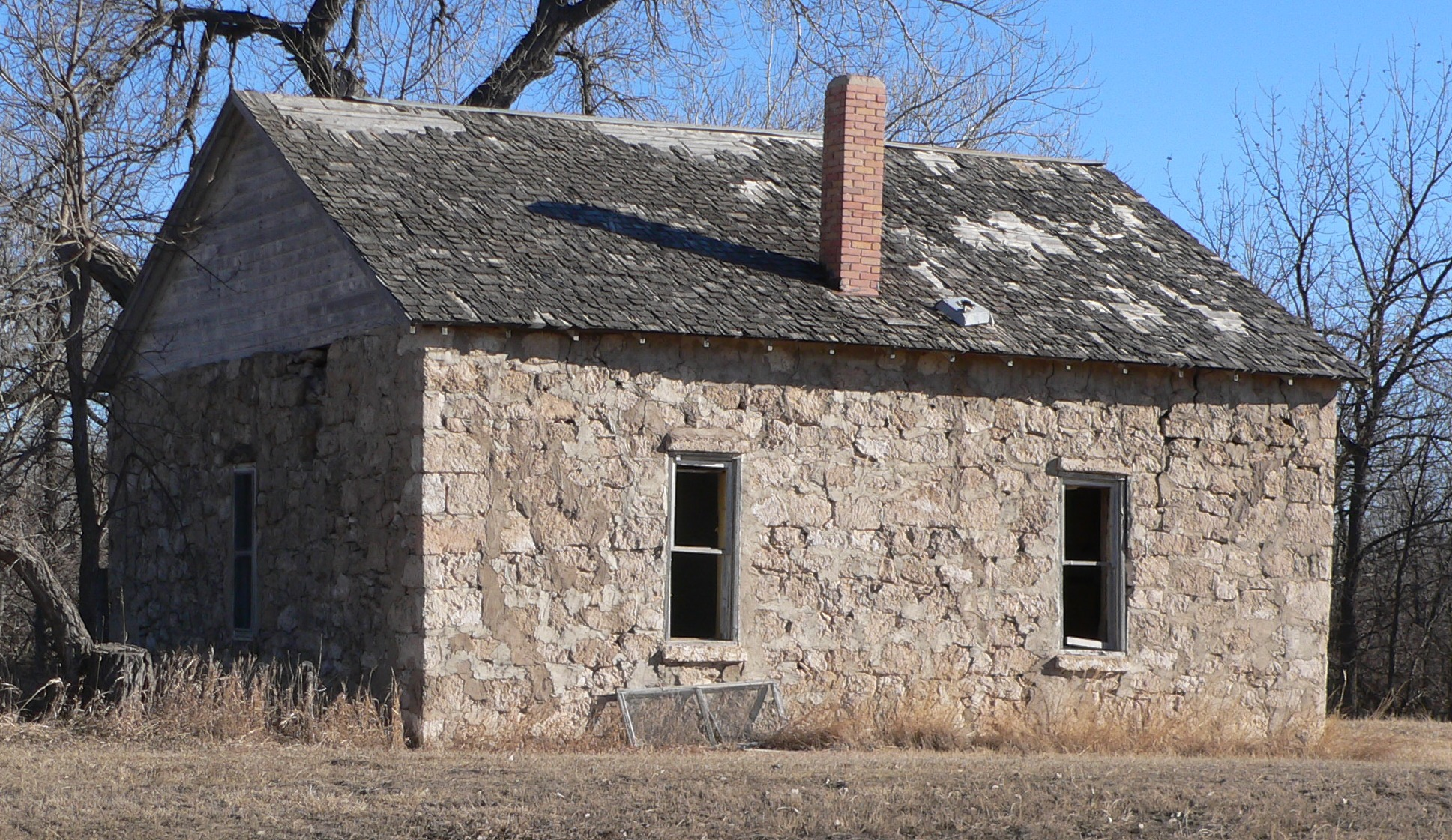
- Nearest city: Hamlet, Nebraska
- Area: less than one acre
- Built: 1884
- Built by: Daniel, John M.
- NRHP reference No.: 85001170
- Added to NRHP: May 30, 1985

The J. M. Daniel House and the J. M. Daniel School-District No. 3 are historic sites in or near Hamlet, Nebraska which were separately listed on the National Register of Historic Places in 1985.

They were both built by J. M. Daniel.

The house, built in 1876, has also been known as Estelle Post Office and Store; the school, built in 1884, has also been known as Estelle School.

They are stone buildings.

== See also ==
- St. John's Evangelical Lutheran German Church and Cemetery, also listed on the National Register in Hayes County
