= Alliance Commercial Historic District =

Historic district in Nebraska, United States

- U.S. National Register of Historic Places
- U.S. Historic district
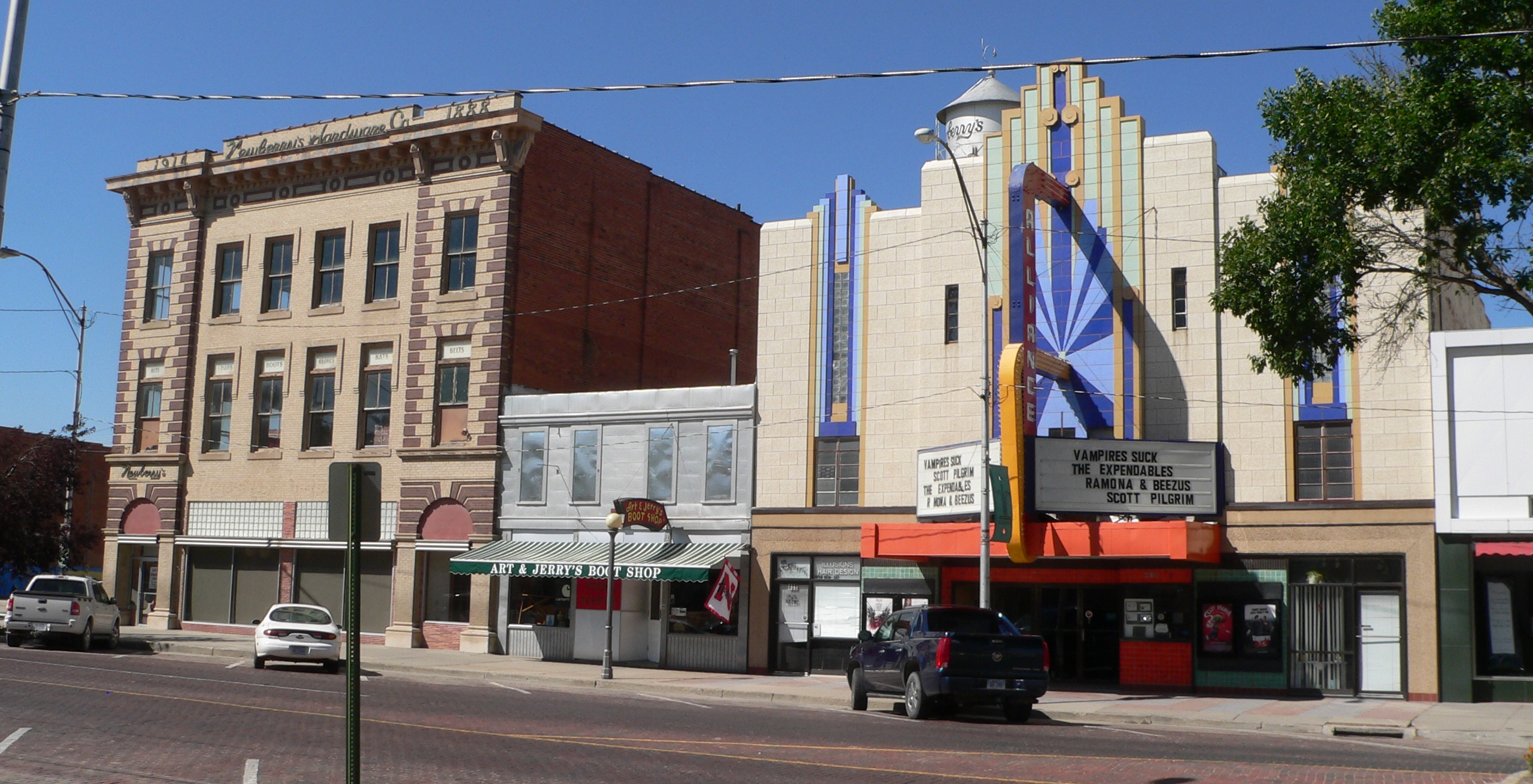
- District buildings in 2011

- Location within Nebraska Location within the United States
- Location: Roughly along Box Butte Ave., Alliance, Nebraska
- Coordinates: 42°5′53″N 102°52′15″W
- Area: 17.4 acres (7.0 ha)
- Built: 1893
- Architectural style: Romanesque, Mission/Spanish Revival
- NRHP reference No.: 07000180
- Added to NRHP: March 21, 2007

The Alliance Commercial Historic District, located roughly along Box Butte Ave. in Alliance, Nebraska is a historic district that was listed on the National Register of Historic Places in 2007. It includes Romanesque and Mission/Spanish Revival architecture amidst its 44 contributing buildings over 17.4 acres (7.0 ha).

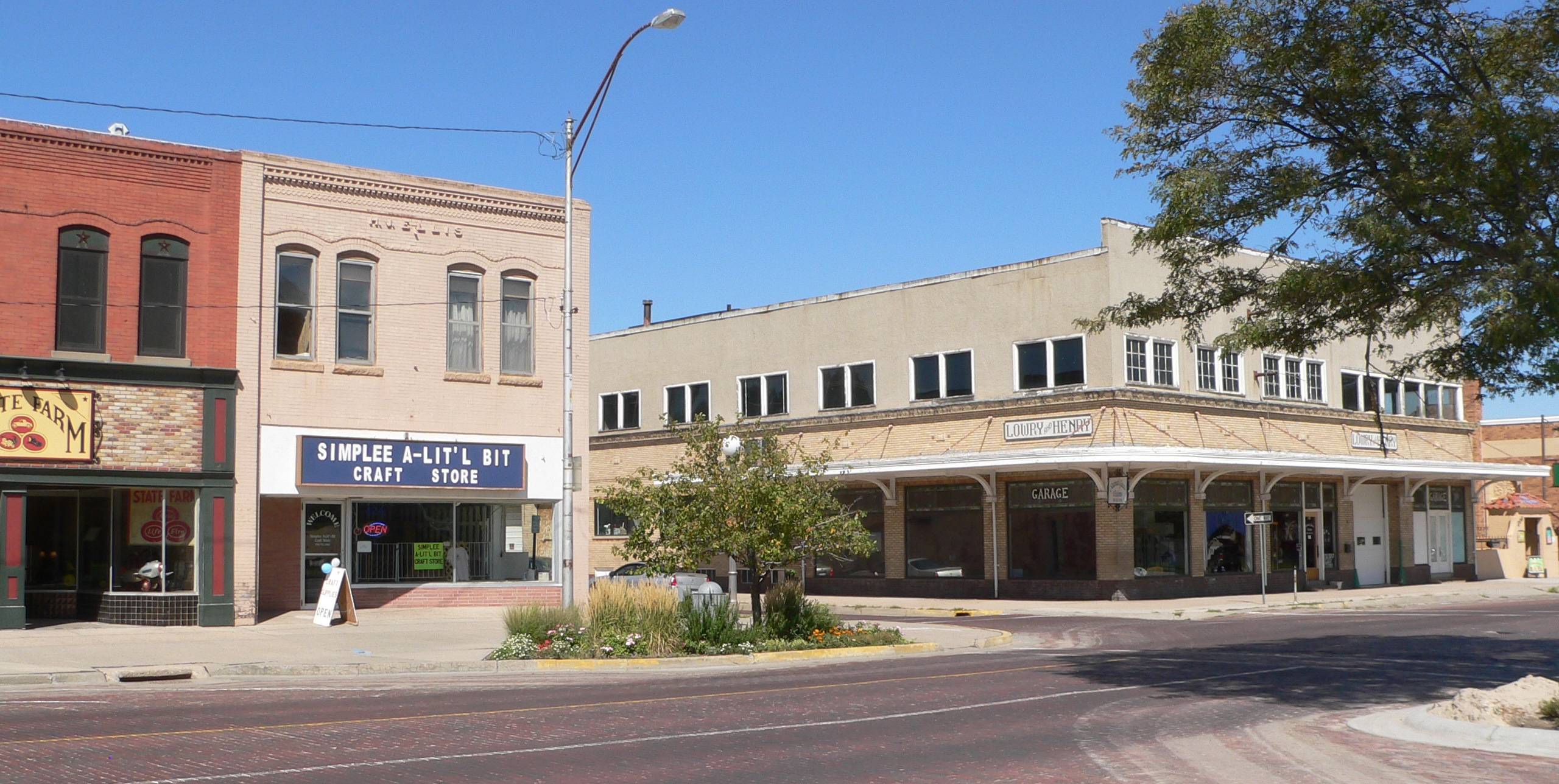

The city of Alliance was founded in 1888 with the arrival of a railroad. Its commercial district, which includes some '"high style"' buildings including an Art Deco theatre and a neo-classical style post office, are included in the district along with other late 1800s and early 1900s buildings. Its oldest buildings date from 1893. Its NRHP nomination asserted that the district was mostly intact and "is able to evoke a sense of historic time and place."
