= United Brethren Church (Aurora, Nebraska) =

Historic church in Nebraska, United States

- U.S. National Register of Historic Places
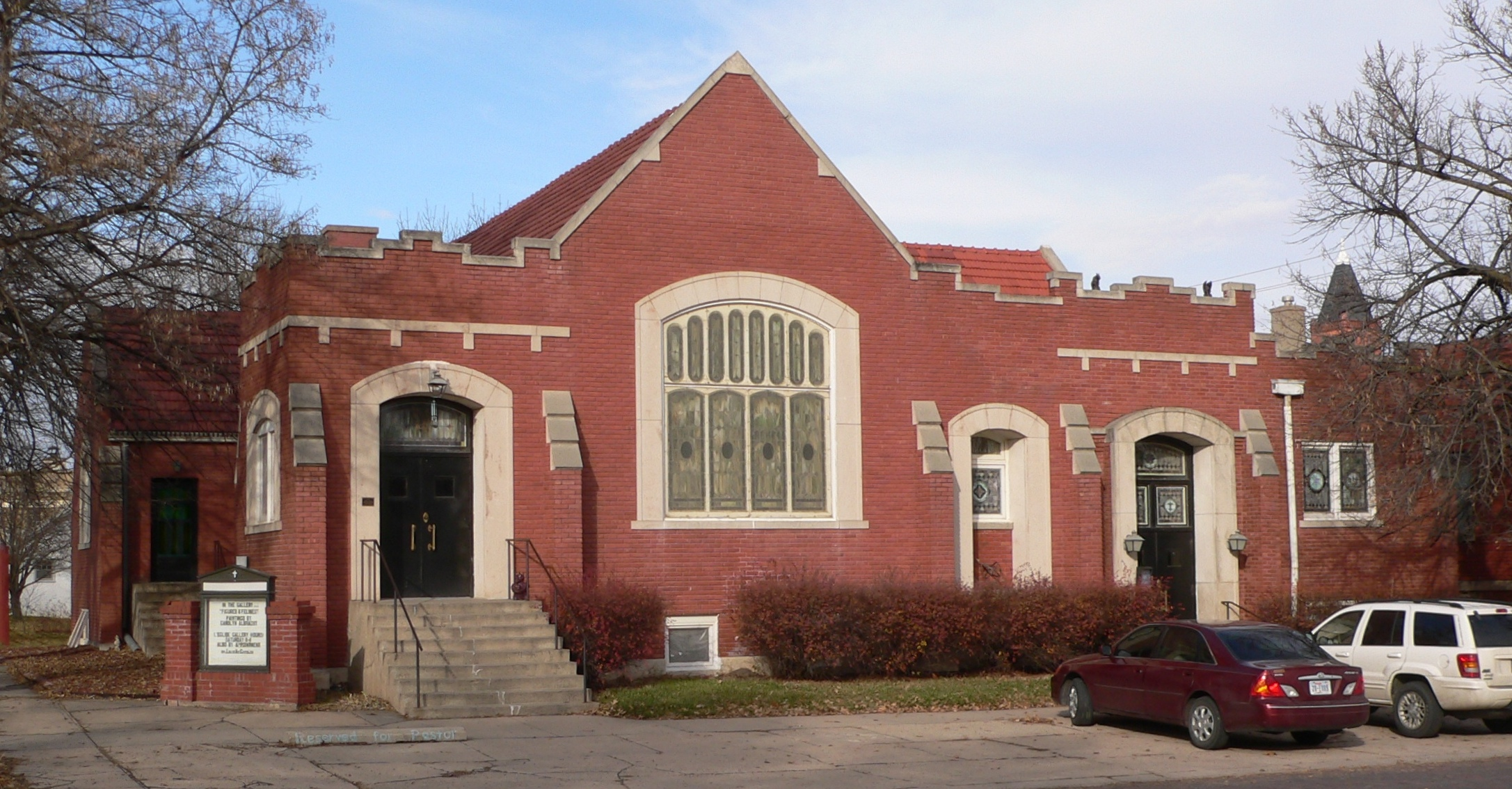

- Location within Nebraska Location within the United States
- Location: 1103 K St., Aurora, Nebraska
- Coordinates: 40°51′59″N 98°0′13″W
- Area: less than one acre
- Built: 1912
- Architect: Blair, Mr.; Wood, Harvey
- Architectural style: Tudor Revival
- NRHP reference No.: 08001133
- Added to NRHP: December 3, 2008

United Brethren Church is a church at 1103 K Street in Aurora, Nebraska.

It was built in 1912 and was added to the National Register in 2008.
