= Menter Farmstead =

- U.S. National Register of Historic Places
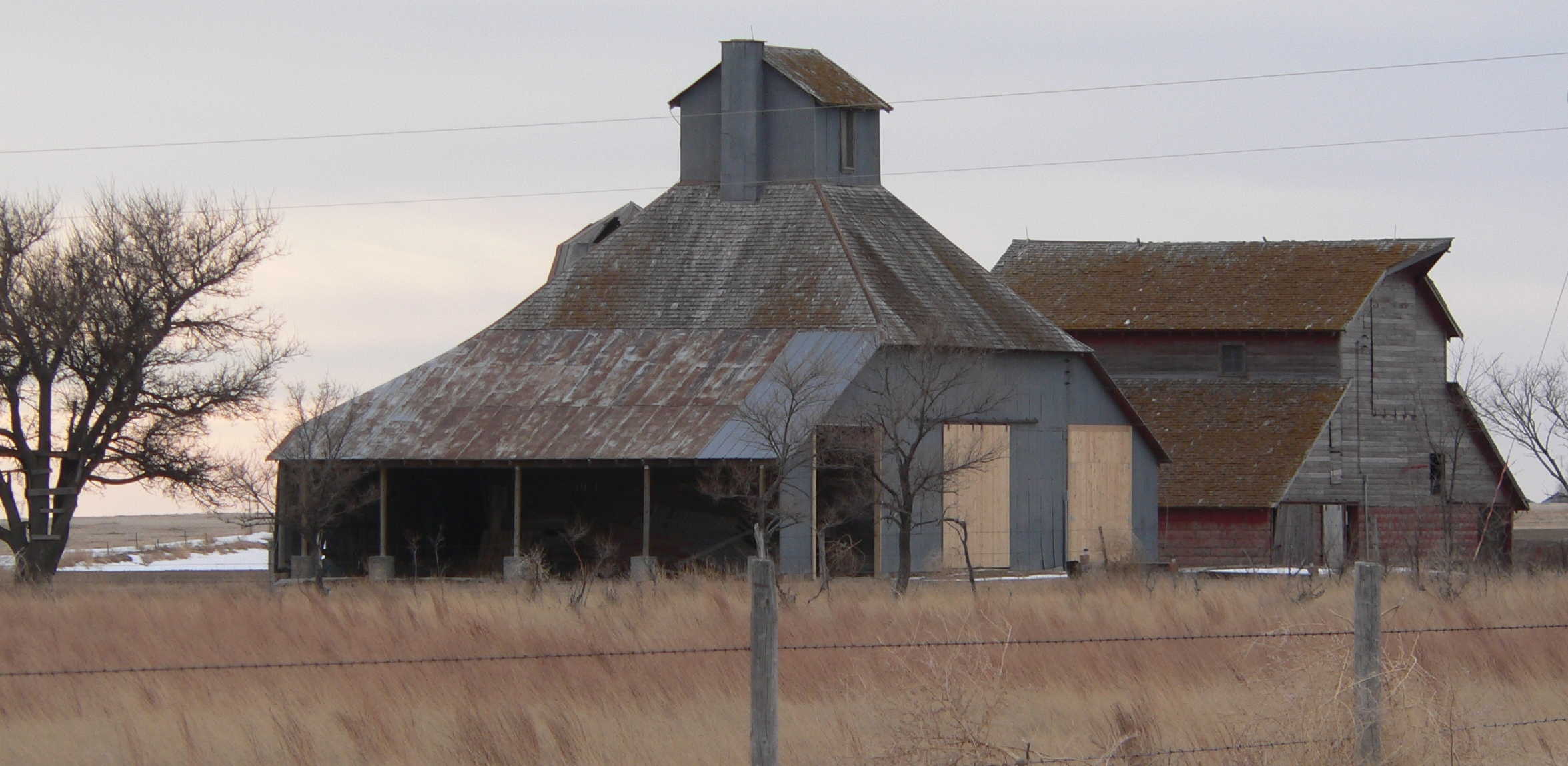

- Location within Nebraska Location within the United States
- Location: 1270 North Fork Rd.
- Nearest city: Big Springs, Nebraska
- Coordinates: 41.0833°N 102.0944°W
- NRHP reference No.: 11000886
- Added to NRHP: December 7, 2011

The Menter Farmstead, near Big Springs, Nebraska, United States, was listed on the National Register of Historic Places in 2011. It is a farmstead built 1919–1928 during a regional agricultural boom sparked by winter wheat demand in World War I, and reflecting increased mechanization with its grain elevator and concrete block construction.

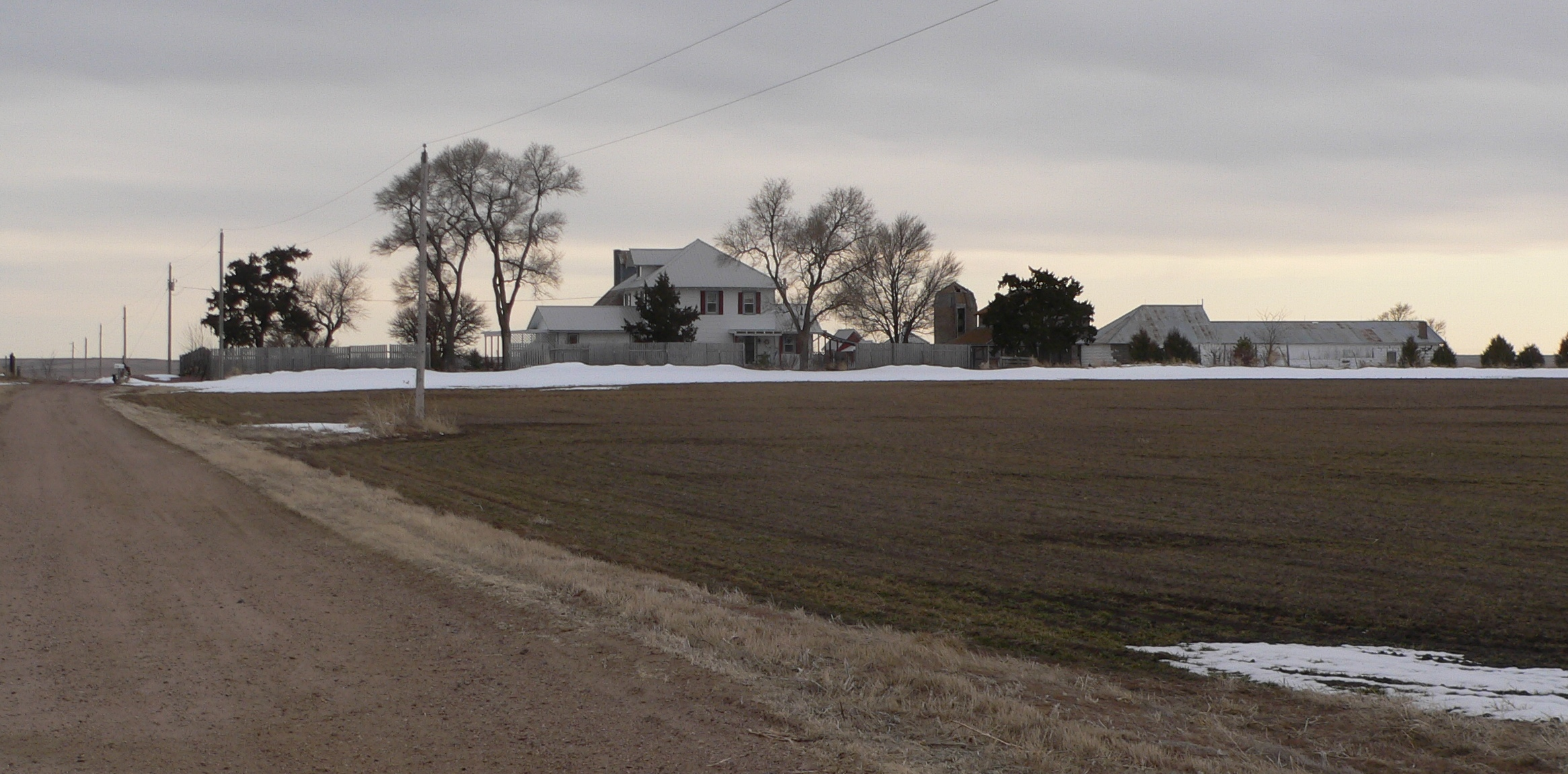

The most significant historic structure is the approximately 100-by-100-foot (30 m × 30 m) barn, built c.1919. It has a complex roof with eaves and original wood shingles, built upon lower concrete block walls and a concrete foundation. It has been termed a variation of the "Midwest Three Portal Barn" type.

The listing on the National Register in 2011 included several contributing and non-contributing buildings.
