= A.T. Ranch Headquarters =

- A. T. Ranch Headquarters
- U.S. National Register of Historic Places
- U.S. Historic district
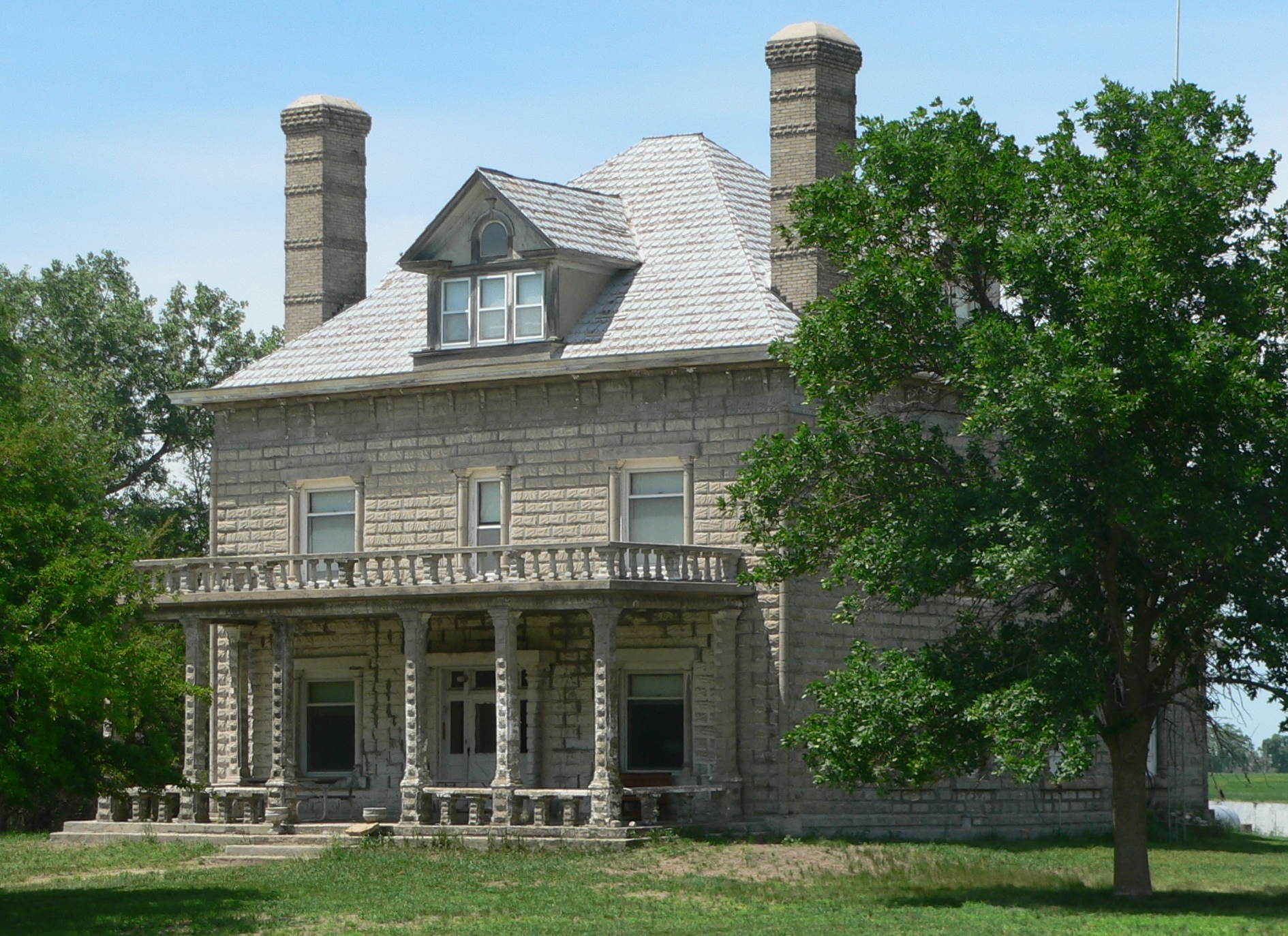

- Location within Nebraska Location within the United States
- Location: Star Route 1
- Nearest city: Bartlett, Nebraska
- Coordinates: 41°56′52″N 98°29′58″W
- Area: less than one acre
- Built: 1906
- Architectural style: Renaissance Revival
- NRHP reference No.: 90000565
- Added to NRHP: May 2, 1990

The A. T. Ranch Headquarters, in Wheeler County, Nebraska near Bartlett, Nebraska, has historic significance dating to 1906. Also known as The Headquarters and denoted as WH00-19, it was listed on the National Register of Historic Places in 1990. The listing included two contributing buildings and one other contributing structure. The main building at this rural site is a two-story house built in 1906 from concrete blocks formed at the site. The building is in Renaissance Revival style.

It was deemed significant as an "excellent example" of Renaissance Revival style and as the most important artifact remaining from what was once a 40,000-acre (16,000 ha) ranch.
