= Oshkosh Water Tower =

- U.S. National Register of Historic Places
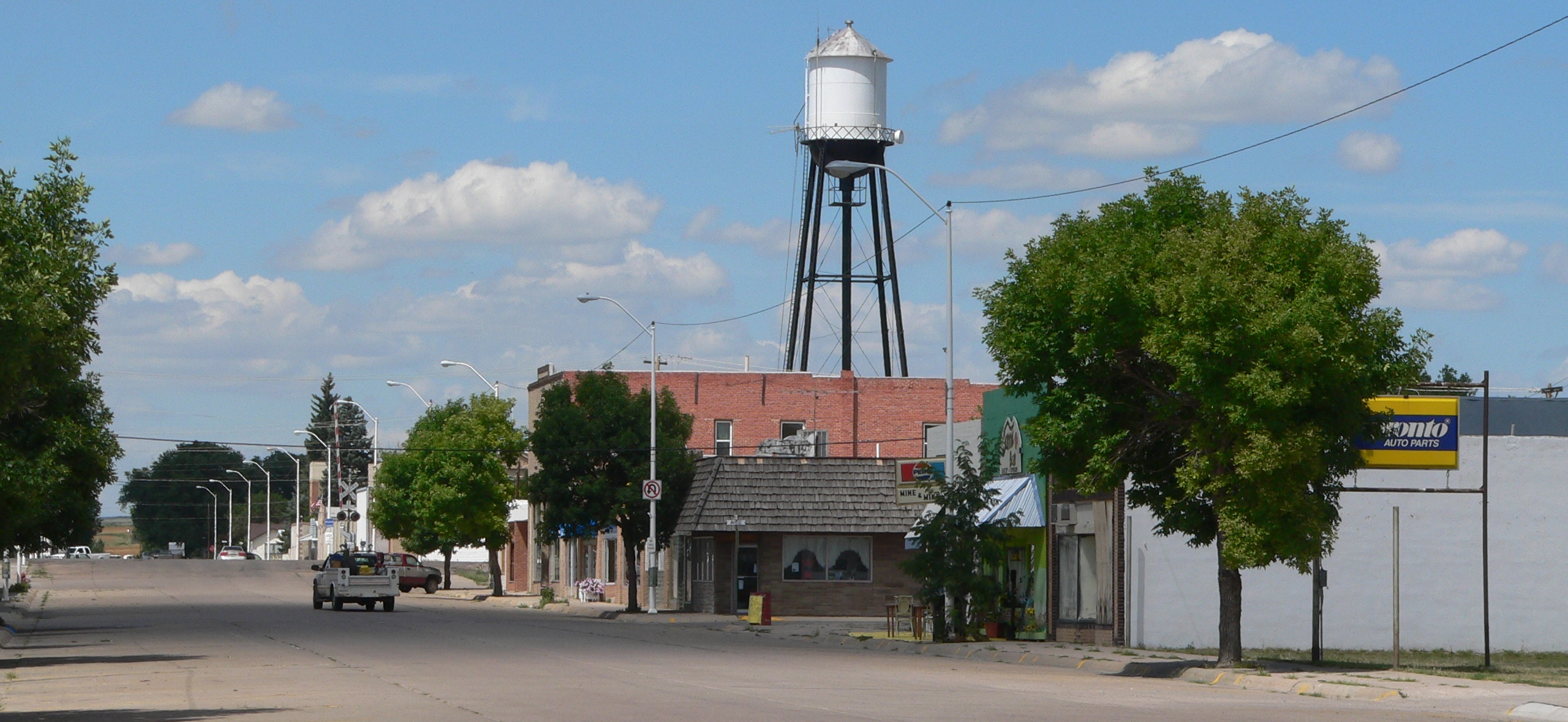

- Location within Nebraska
- Location: 103 East Ave. E., Oshkosh, Nebraska
- Coordinates: 41°24′24″N 102°20′38″W
- Built: 1920
- NRHP reference No.: 100004140
- Added to NRHP: June 26, 2019

The Oshkosh Water Tower in Oshkosh, Nebraska was listed on the National Register of Historic Places in 2019.

It is nearly a century old. It is no longer in use and is now owned by the Oshkosh Water Tower nonprofit, which is preserving it.

It was built in 1920 and served until the winter of 2017–18.

It is located at 103 East Ave. E. in Oshkosh.
