= Lackawanna Steel Company =

Defunct American steel manufacturer

- Type: Public
- Industry: Steel manufacturing, railroads, coal mining
- Founded: 1840
- Founder: George W. Scranton; Seldon T. Scranton; William Henry
- Defunct: 1922 purchased; 1982 ceased operation
- Headquarters: Scranton, Pennsylvania (1840–1902); Lackawanna, New York (1902–1982)
- Area served: United States
- Key people: William Walker Scranton; Joseph H. Scranton; Moses Taylor; William Liston Brown; Daniel W. Broadbent
- Products: Steel, coke
- Services: Rail transport
- Parent: Bethlehem Steel after 1922
- Subsidiaries: Delaware, Lackawanna and Western Railroad

The Lackawanna Steel Company was an American steel manufacturing company that existed as an independent company from 1840 to 1922, and as a subsidiary of the Bethlehem Steel company from 1922 to 1983. Founded by the Scranton family, it was once the second-largest steel company in the world (and the largest company outside the U.S. Steel trust). Scranton, Pennsylvania, developed around the company's original location. When the company moved to a suburb of Buffalo, New York, in 1902, it stimulated the founding of the city of Lackawanna.

== History ==
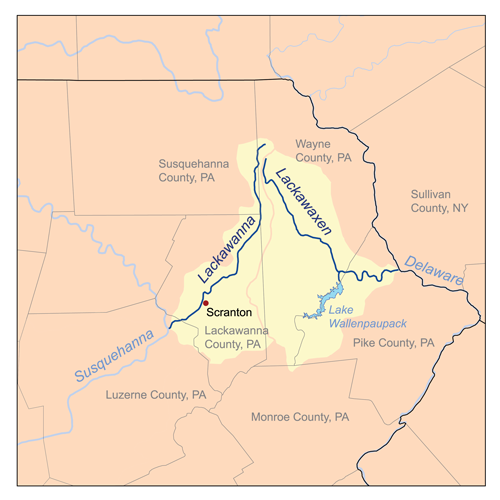
Lackawanna River and Valley in Northeastern Pennsylvania

At the beginning of the 1800s, the Lackawanna Valley in Pennsylvania was rich in anthracite coal and iron deposits. Brothers George W. Scranton and Seldon T. Scranton moved to the valley in 1840 and settled in the five-house town of Slocum's Hollow in present-day Scranton, Pennsylvania, to establish an iron forge. Although Europeans had been making steel for nearly three centuries, the processes for creating blister steel and crucible steel were slow and extremely expensive.

The Scrantons focused instead on manufacturing pig iron, using a blast furnace. They wanted to take advantage of a recent technological innovation in iron smelting, the "hot blast". Developed in Scotland in 1828, the hot blast preheats air before it is pumped through molten iron, substantially lowering fuel needs. The Scrantons also intended to experiment with using anthracite coal to make steel, rather than existing methods which used charcoal or bituminous coal.

The most likely successful first use of the hot-blast technique in the U.S. was carried out in 1835 at Oxford Furnace in Warren County, New Jersey, by William Henry, Seldon Scranton's father-in-law. By 1838, Henry had moved to the Lackawanna Valley, where he was experimenting with using anthracite coal in steelmaking.

The Scrantons and Henry formed a partnership in 1840 to develop a hot blast furnace that used anthracite coal in the charge. The mixture of iron ore and coal, when melted, created pig iron. Two other Pennsylvanians, Sanford Grant, a Belvidere, New Jersey, businessman, and Philipp Mattes, a bank manager from Easton, Pennsylvania, also invested in the new company, named Scranton, Grant, and Co. Henry bought 503 acres (2.04 km^{2}) near Slocum's Hollow, and began building the furnace. The blast furnace was completed in the early autumn of 1841.

The company's first effort at smelting iron was not successful. Many problems plagued the iron mill, including a furnace that was not hot enough, water that ran too low in the nearby creek to turn the waterwheel-powered bellows (and thus did not provide enough air to the furnace), unsuccessful experiments with charge mixtures, clogged tuyeres, and more. George Scranton estimated the company lost between $6,000 and $7,000 in the year ending June 1843, but the total may have been as high as $10,000. George Scranton took control of the works from William Henry, and twice rebuilt the furnace. Near bankruptcy, the partners sought new sources of capital. In May 1843, a $20,000 loan permitted the company to continue operating.

After many failures and two years of low-level and low-quality production of pig iron, the firm began producing significant amounts of pig iron in 1843. The company installed a rolling mill, five reverberatory furnaces, 20 nail manufacturing machines, and one spike manufacturing machine. Needing more cash, the company was reorganized in September 1846, taking the new name of Scrantons and Grant. New partners were brought in, including Joseph H. Scranton, a cousin from Georgia, Erastus C. Scranton, a cousin from Connecticut, and John Howland, a banker and businessman from New York. The Scranton family retained 51.6 percent of the company's stock.

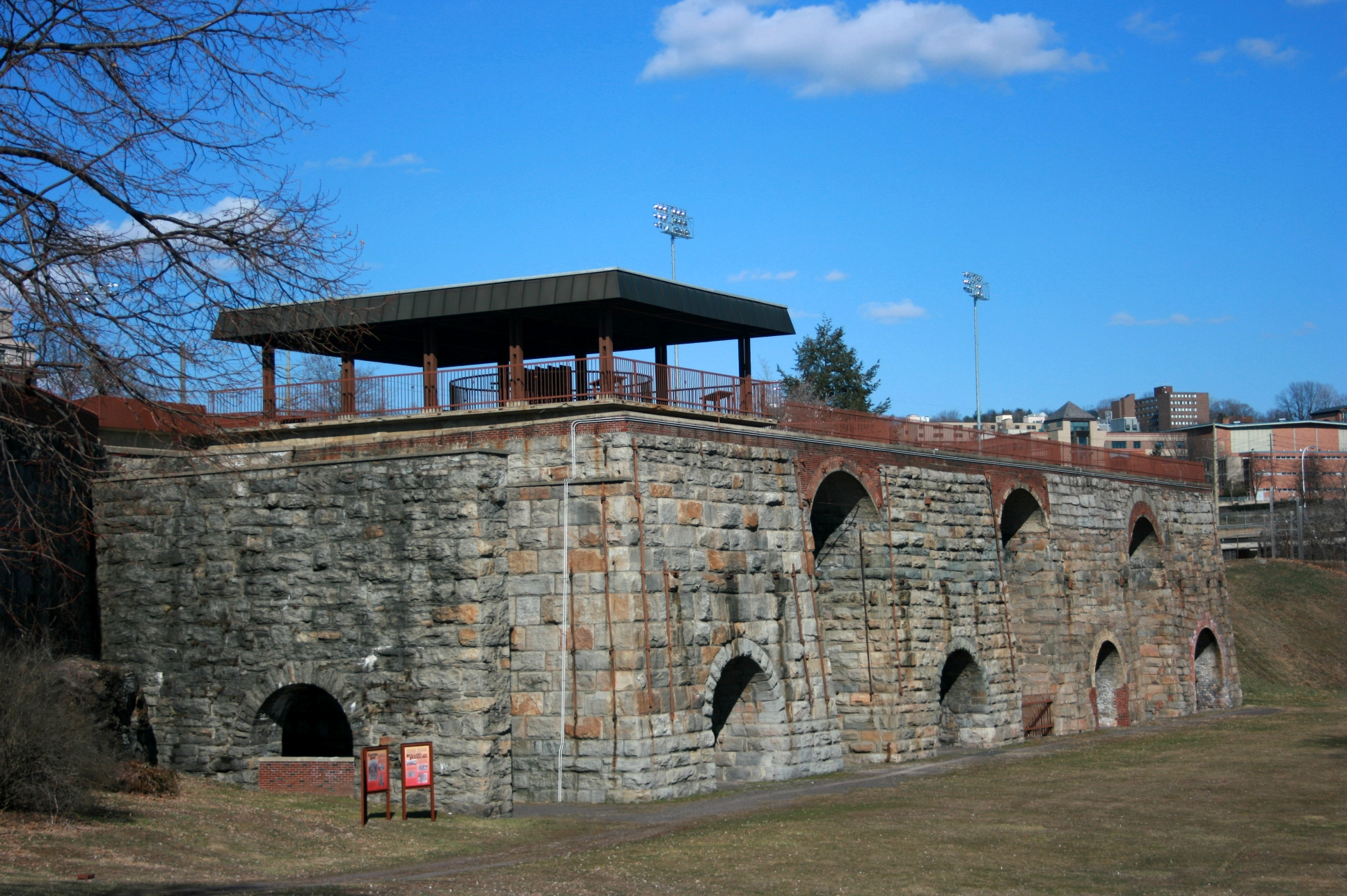
Lackawanna Steel Company's original iron furnaces, built in 1840 near Scranton

Quality control problems plagued the company and nearly drove it to bankruptcy again. By summer 1844, the furnace averaged five to seven tons of pig iron a day. Scrantons and Grant initially used the pig iron to produce nails and iron plates, but the quality of the ore—"red-short" rather than the required close-grained "cold-short"—prevented the smelting of high-quality pig iron. The company's finances spiraled downward. Railroad networks in the U.S. were tripling in size during the 1840s, and the railroads required large quantities of rails. But until 1844, the U.S. had no factories capable of manufacturing rails, and all rails had to be imported and shipped by sea from Great Britain.

Realizing that the cold-short ore they used was ideal for manufacturing rail tracks, the Scrantons sought new investors whose money would permit it to build a rail track rolling mill. Benjamin Loder, president of the New York and Erie Railroad; industrialist William E. Dodge; and eight others invested $90,000 in the firm.

The Scrantons and Grant reorganized again on November 7, 1846, and began calling the company Scrantons and Platt. Grant was bought out, and Howland asked to have his investment returned. The company quickly began turning out rails for the Erie Railroad, becoming the first company in the United States to mass-produce T rails. The firm's decision to manufacture rail tracks changed the fundamental nature of transportation in the United States, accelerated rail use, and eliminated American dependence on England for railroad track. Rail production began in August 1847, and the company soon employed more than 800 mostly Welsh, Irish, and German workers. Shipments of rail track were hauled overland through the snow to the New York and Erie Railroad, arriving just in time to save the line from bankruptcy.

In 1851, Slocum's Hollow changed its name to Scranton in honor of the owners of the iron works. The Scrantons had won approval from the townspeople some years before to rename Slocum's Hollow as the town of Harrison, in honor of U.S. President William Henry Harrison. The town was renamed Scrantonia in 1850, and the name shortened in 1851 to Scranton. The swiftly growing iron mill led to similar growth in Scranton, whose population soared from a few hundred in 1850 to 9,000 in 1860 to 35,000 in 1870.

=== Growth years ===
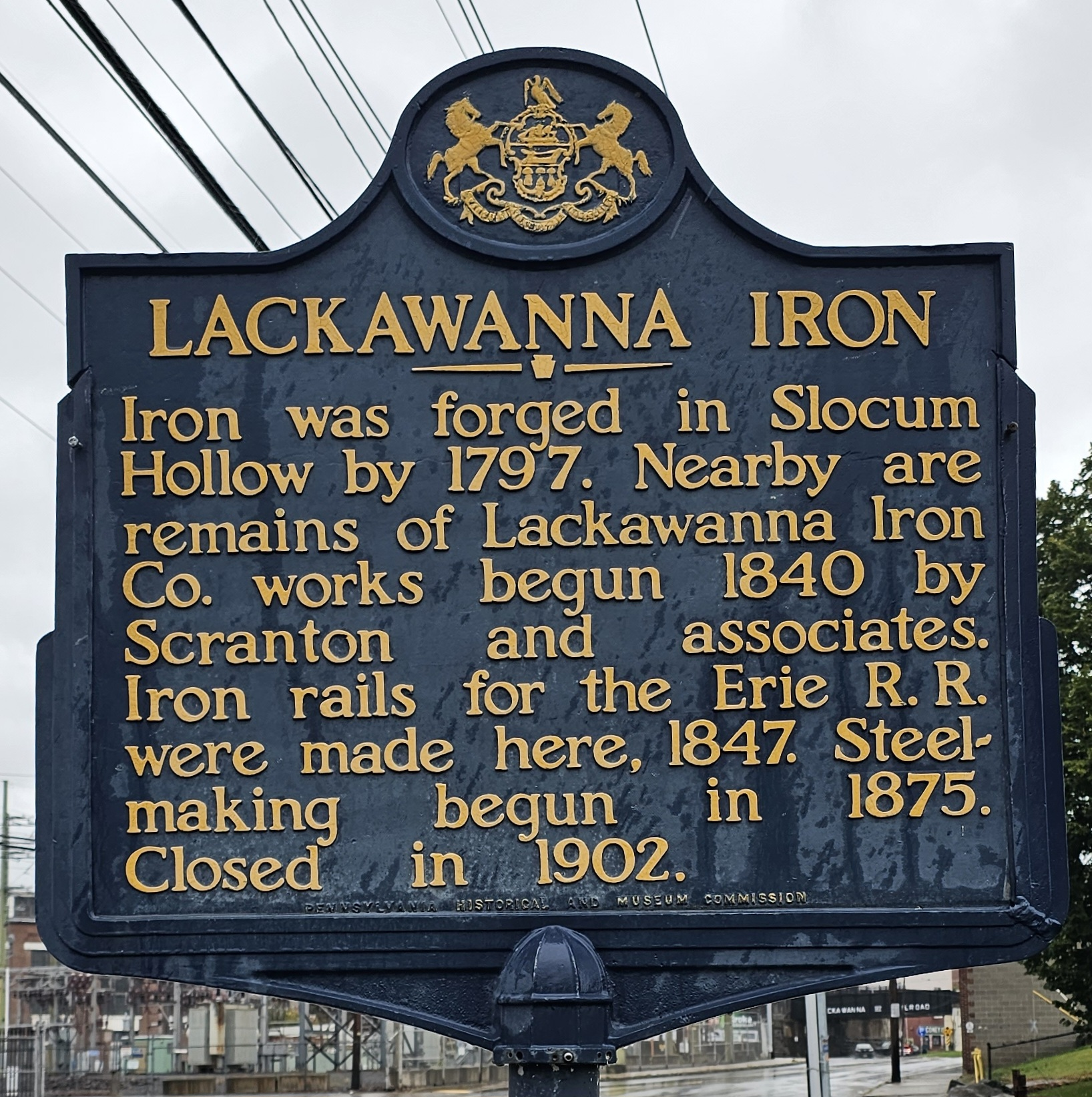
A Pennsylvania historical marker near Scranton Iron Furnaces

In 1853, the firm reorganized, doubling its capital investment and adopting the name Lackawanna Iron and Coal Company. Within a year, the company's assets had expanded to include three furnaces, a steel-making puddling mill, a foundry, two blacksmith shops, two carpentry shops, a saw mill, a grist mill, company store, 200 dwellings (to house workers), a boarding house, iron ore mines, coal mines, a tavern, and a hotel.

The company also expanded into the railroad business in 1853. Needing a secure way of getting products to market without having to pay the exorbitant fees charged by the railways, the company purchased a controlling interest in the Delaware and Cobb's Gap Railroad and the Lackawanna and Western Railroad. They reorganized the combined subsidiary into the Delaware, Lackawanna and Western Railroad, beginning vertical integration of their industry.

A second generation of Scrantons took control of the Lackawanna Iron and Coal Company in the 1860s, bringing new technological innovations to the firm. William Walker Scranton, son of Joseph Scranton, was born in 1844. At the age of 23, William Walker Scranton had already become superintendent of one of the Lackawanna Iron and Coal Company's steel mills. After Joseph Scranton's death in 1872, William took control of the entire family business empire, which now included (in addition to large numbers of coal and iron mines) a bank and the City of Scranton's gas and water works.

During the 1870s, American railroads began buying track rails again from Europe. The reason was the high quality of steel rail produced in Europe, thanks to the invention in 1855 of the Bessemer process for steelmaking. This drastically reduced the fuel costs and amount of time needed to make steel, as well as significantly improving the quality of the steel produced. Scranton took a leave of absence from the firm and secretly went to Britain and then Germany, where he became a puddler and learned the secrets of making "Bessemer steel". But Scranton could not convince his business partners to adopt the Bessemer process.

Meanwhile, industrialist Moses Taylor, a protégé of John Howland's, had organized the Franklin Iron Company to supply pig iron for rail tracks to the Midland Railroad and the Sussex Railroad, of which he was part-owner. Taylor wanted to link his railroads with the Scranton-owned Delaware & Lackawanna, and believed the Lackawanna Iron and Coal Co. could turn his pig iron into finished steel—but only if the company adopted the Bessemer process. Together, Moses Taylor and W.W. Scranton convinced the company's other investors to adopt the Bessemer process in 1875, and to merge the Taylor and Scranton railways in 1881. The first "blow" (or pouring of molten steel from the Bessemer furnace into molds) occurred on October 23, 1875, and the first Bessemer steel rolled in the mill on December 29, 1875.

During the 1870s and the recession, the Lackawanna Iron and Coal Company suffered from significant labor problems. The company was one of many which cut wages in its coal mines 30 percent in 1870. The Delaware & Lackawanna, the company railroad, also sharply cut wages for its workers. The first week of January 1871, a nascent mine workers union, the Workingmen's Benevolent Association, went on strike for higher wages. Scranton helped break the strike by personally leading strikebreaking miners to and from the mines each day. While escorting a body of miners from the mines one afternoon, he was attacked by a mob and in the ensuing fight, two of the rioting strikers were killed. The state militia was called in to restore order, protect the strikebreakers, and help reopen the mines.

The strike began to collapse in April 1871 as strikebreakers opened more mines, and the strikers and their families began to starve. Violence flared again in early May, and state troops were once more called to restore order. Within a few days, the strike had largely been broken and most miners returned to work. William Scranton was arrested twice for his role in leading the strikebreakers, but acquitted at trial each time.

A second large strike hit the company in 1877. The Long Depression began with the Panic of 1873 and did not end until 1896. By 1877, thousands of miners, steel workers, and railroad employees were out of work and wages had been slashed repeatedly. On July 23, 1877, workers in the iron and steel mills owned by the Lackawanna Iron and Coal Co. struck, seeking a 25 percent wage increase. The strike spread to rail workers the next day, and on July 25 the company's mine workers also walked out and demanded a similar wage increase. The company asked Scranton Mayor Robert McKune for police protection the same day, and McKune asked Governor John F. Hartranft for troops. On July 26, Governor Hartranft asked President Rutherford B. Hayes for federal troops, and (with the Great Railroad Strike of 1877 already raging) Hayes agreed to send them at the governor's request. Violence broke out on July 29: The head house of the Penn Coal Co.'s short-line railroad was firebombed, a local bridge was burned, and many of the coal mines owned by the Lackawanna Iron and Coal Co. were flooded. The next day McKune threatened to call out the federal troops, but also offered his own services as an arbitrator.

The two sides met throughout the day, and to everyone's surprise a tentative agreement was reached that evening. Although a majority of the steel workers appeared ready to accept the tentative agreement, a mob of 6,000 men formed on August 1 in downtown Scranton and resolved to reject it. When McKune appeared outside the mayor's office to try to calm the mob, shots were fired. McKune was clubbed and stoned. His lower jaw broken and his upper jaw fractured, McKune tried to flee but was knocked unconscious when a member of the mob hit him in the head with a hammer. A few minutes later, the county sheriff and a hastily assembled posse arrived and fired shots over the heads of the crowd to try to disperse the mob. Several people in the crowd returned fire, wounding the sheriff and a member of the posse. The posse fired several volleys into the crowd, killing four and wounding around 20. Many of those killed and injured were shot in the back as they tried to flee. Mayor McKune, although badly injured, helped restore order around 2 p.m. The following day, 3,000 federal troops arrived from Pittsburgh and entered the city. Martial law was imposed, and the strike ended several uneventfully weeks later with no agreement. The sheriff and several posse members were arrested and tried on the charge of manslaughter, but were acquitted.

The company's labor troubles were supplanted by an internal struggle for control within the Lackawanna Iron and Coal Co. By 1880, the company was the second-largest producer of iron in the United States. But, Scranton wanted the company to expand, a proposal which the board of directors rejected in 1881. Scranton quit the company and formed the Scranton Steel Co. with his brother, Walter Scranton, in 1881. Within 10 years, the Scranton Steel Co. had become so successful that the Lackawanna Iron and Coal Co. entered into negotiations to merge with the firm. The two companies merged on January 9, 1891, forming the Lackawanna Iron and Steel Company. Although the merger created nearly $1.2 million in debt for the new company, Lackawanna Iron & Steel proved to be so financially successful that it paid off the debt within a year.

=== West Seneca, New York relocation ===
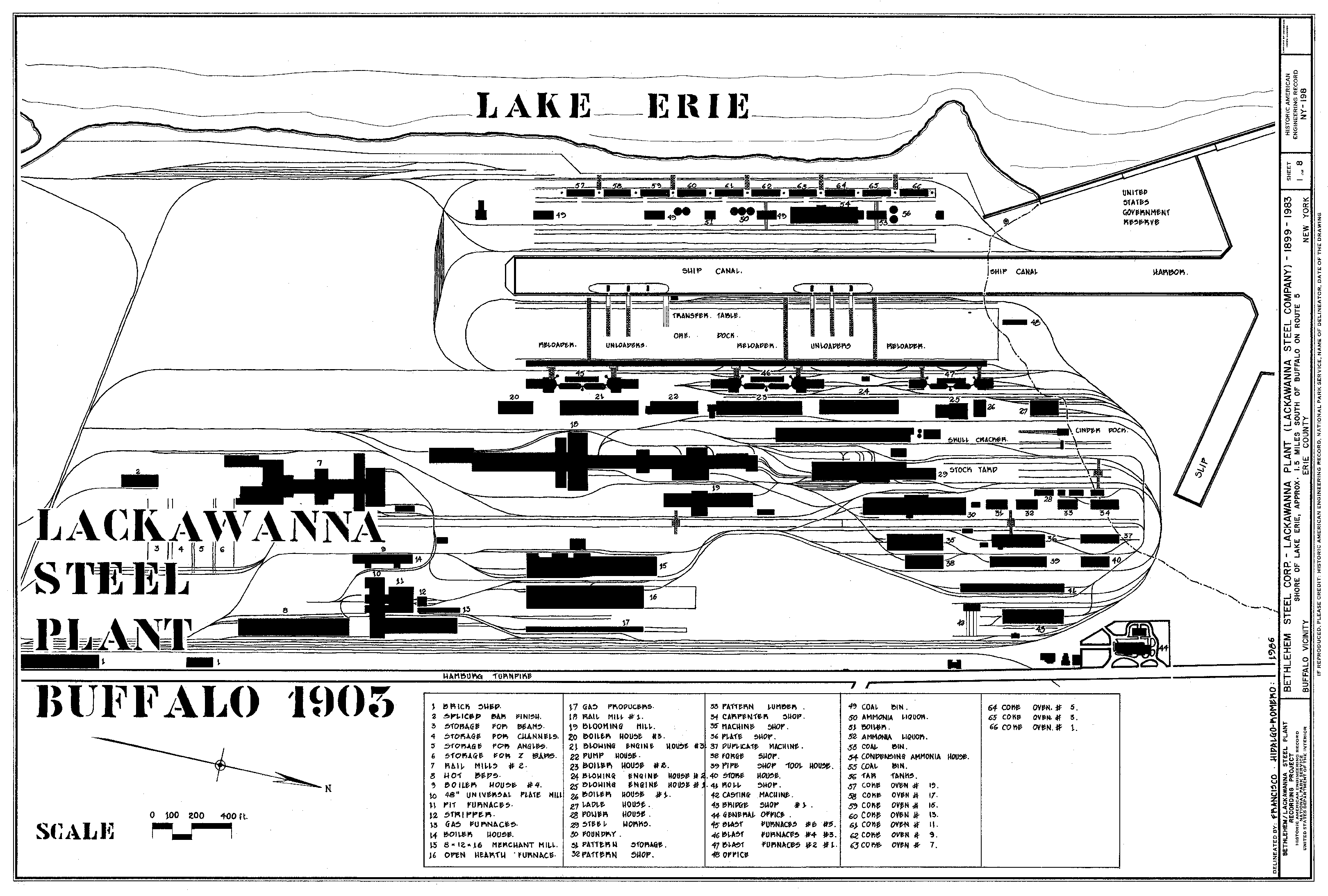
A diagram of the Lackawanna Steel Company plant in 1903

At the turn of the century, the Lackawanna Iron and Steel Company began to consider moving out of the Scranton area. The company's economic condition was deteriorating; in September 1899, Andrew Carnegie wrote, "My view is that sooner or later Harrisburg, Sparrows Point, and Scranton will cease to make rails, like Bethlehem. The autumn of last year seemed as good a time to force them out of business as any other."

Labor costs were rising. In 1897, the United Mine Workers organized most workers at the coal and iron mines, who successfully struck in 1900 for a 10 percent wage hike. The union struck again from May 11, 1902, to October 23, 1902, and won a second wage increase as well as better working conditions. A second factor was the increasing cost of shipping iron ore to Scranton and a lack of rail lines from Scranton to the company's newly emerging markets.

In 1899, Lackawanna Iron and Steel Company move its facilities to West Seneca, New York, drawn by the area's easy access to Great Lakes shipping and the numerous rail lines in the area. Scranton decided to move his operation to the Buffalo suburb, located on Lake Erie. To avoid speculation in land, the Lackawanna Steel Company employed John J. Albright, president of the Ontario Power Company, to purchase land on its behalf. Scranton, Albright and several others met in Buffalo on March 23, 1899, to discuss the purchase of land. The group explored several nearby sites on March 24, and that same day chose an undeveloped shoreline area on Lake Erie in what was then the western part of the Town of West Seneca. Albright began purchasing land on April 1, 1899, and by the end of the month had obtained nearly all the required property for the extremely low price of $1.1 million. Albright was often accompanied on his purchasing visits by John G. Milburn, President of the Pan-American Exposition, and many property owners assumed the land purchases were for the Exposition.

Construction of the massive new steel mill began on July 14, 1900, and nine months later equipment was arriving from Scranton. The company dredged a ship canal and built miles of track to link the plant with the railroads which would bring iron ore and coke to the plant. Lackawanna Iron and Steel began building a company town in 1901, but it lacked most services. The housing stood empty for many years.

In December 1900, the Lackawanna Coal & Coke Company was incorporated in Pennsylvania as a subsidiary to provide coke. Coal mines and coke ovens were opened in the company town of Wehrum, Pennsylvania, named after company general manager Henry Wehrum. The coal was not of high quality and there was little production after 1904. The town was abandoned by the 1930s.

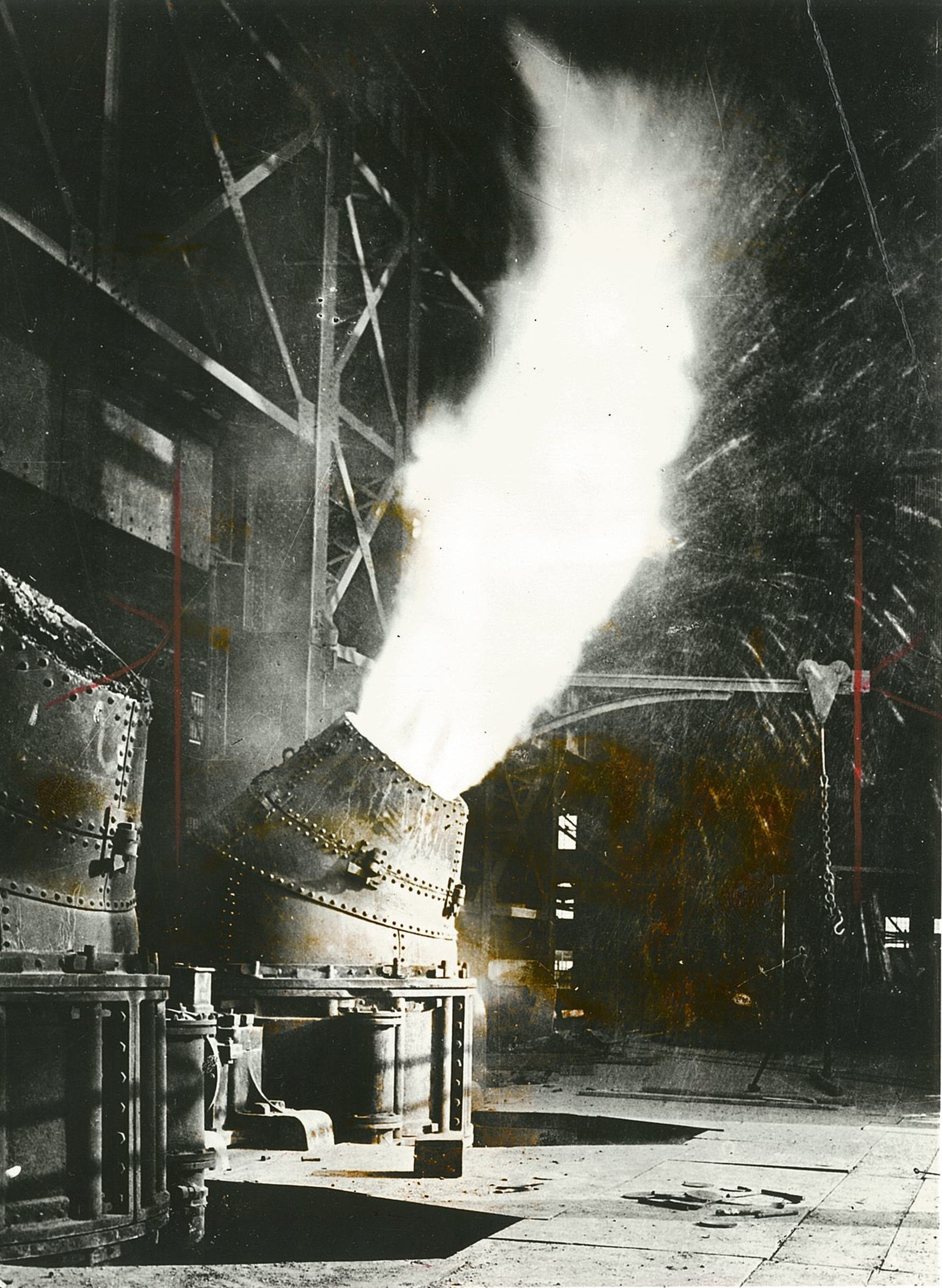
A bessemer converter brought to New York from Pennsylvania.

On February 14, 1902, the company was reorganized into the Lackawanna Steel Company. It was the largest independent steel company in the world at the time. Stock worth $60 million was issued, with $20 million of the newly raised capital paying off the construction of the new mill. The mill received its first shipment of iron ore on December 23, 1902. The plant's 6,000 workers (2,000 of whom came from Scranton) blew the first steel in early 1903. The company's property in Scranton was sold to the Lackawanna and Wyoming Valley Railroad, which scrapped all the remaining equipment and tore down all the buildings except for the oldest stone blast furnaces.

The economic coup which William Walker Scranton had engineered did not please the board of directors, however, who replaced him in late 1904 with Edward A. Clarke. The company continued to expand, and in 1906 bought the large Pennsylvania coal mining firm of J.W. Ellsworth Company.

Lackawanna Steel Co. had a rocky relationship with the town of West Seneca. The company demanded large investments in sewer, water, gas and road improvements but refused to pay for them (even though the company was much wealthier than the town). The large influx of workers from the company's old Pennsylvania site swelled the Town's population, leading to the creation of extensive tracts of extremely substandard housing and severe public health problems (including outbreaks of cholera, typhoid and influenza). To save the town, West Senecans proposed separating the area around the steel mill as its own incorporated municipality. Lackawanna Steel opposed the incorporation of the proposed municipality (to be named Lackawanna), but it relented in 1909 after the two-year-long Panic of 1907 nearly bankrupted the Town of West Seneca and imperiled the company's operations.

The creation of U.S. Steel in 1901 supplanted Lackawanna Steel as the country's largest steel manufacturer. A number of the so-called "independent" steel companies considered merger over the next two decades as a response to U.S. Steel's formation. In late 1915, Lackawanna Steel nearly consummated a merger with the Cambria Steel Company, Newport News Shipbuilding and Drydock Company, Youngstown Sheet and Tube, and Inland Steel. But despite the agreement of the steel companies, federal regulators, and others, the banks carrying the debt for these companies refused to approve the merger and the plan was dropped. The company's financial status varied considerably in the late 1910s. The stock set new highs and the company doubled its profits in 1917 and the first half of 1918, but in late 1918 and throughout 1919 the company fell on hard financial times.

Although Lackawanna Steel had moved to New York in part to avoid unionization, the unions followed the company. An attempt to unionize the company was made in 1919 by the Amalgamated Association of Iron and Steel Workers. Lackawanna's Democratic mayor, John Toomey, was supported financially by the Lackawanna Steel Co. Toomey initiated a vicious red-baiting campaign to smear the union organizing effort as communist-inspired and led. The company fired hundreds of workers in the summer and fall of 1919 for being union members or union sympathizers. Nonetheless, by 1919 more than 18,000 steelworkers at Lackawanna Steel and five other, smaller metallurgical firms in the area were organized by the American Federation of Labor (although Lackawanna officials estimated there were far fewer union members). Lackawanna Steel officials, fearing that immigrant union members would become violent, asked for and received protection from the New York State Police. The Lackawanna Steel organizing drive was part of a nationwide organizing effort by the union, and the union resolved to launch a nationwide strike in the fall of 1919 to organize the entire steel industry. The strike began on September 22, with the union claiming 8,000 of the plant's 9,000 workers had struck and the company asserting only half the workers had walked out. The same day, three riots broke out in the city. Late in the afternoon, during the shift change, a crowd of 7,000 pro-union strikers and supporters began throwing rocks, bottles and debris at the company's guards, and city police were called in to break up the disturbance.

At 7:20 p.m., a crowd of 3,000 unionists and their supporters intercepted a group of 200 strikebreakers leaving the plant, and chased them through the surrounding neighborhood before police intervened and stopped them. Later in the evening, a small crowd of men beat a man who announced he would work for the company's private police force, and city police once more were called in. On September 23, 1919, company police clashed twice late in the afternoon with a crowd of about 3,000 striking workers. At 5:50 p.m., after being pelted with rocks and glass bottles, company police fired more than 50 12-gauge shotguns blasts into the crowd. "[F]rantic signals to cease firing" by the Lackawanna Police, who were in the middle of the crowd trying to restore order, "were disregarded by the plant guards". The company guards killed two and injured three. The plant remained closed through September 28, with only 500 employees reporting for work. Lackawanna Steel, which had employed only 72 African Americans prior to the strike, hired several thousand black strikebreakers and brought them to the city to maintain operations. Outraged, union workers turned to political activity. Toomey lost re-election in the city's regularly scheduled mayoral race on November 4, 1919, and John H. Gibbons, a Socialist, was elected. Although the national organizing committee called off the strike on January 8, 1920, Gibbons' election reinvigorated the strike and some workers stayed out until June 1920. Nearly all the black strikebreakers were fired after the strike when the company took back its striking workers. The organizing campaign failed, but the company was eventually organized by the Steel Workers Organizing Committee in the late 1930s after passage of the National Labor Relations Act in 1935.

In the two years after the organizing drive, the company continued to see wide swings in profitability. In 1920, the company's profits fell again, and a merger was rumored. The company declared itself profitable in late 1920, and then reported large deficits in 1921. Rumors that the company might sell itself emerged in mid-October 1921, but in fact the firm went on a buying spree and snapped up a pig iron manufacturer and a steel bridge maker.

Over the next several years, the Lackawanna plant continued to expand physically, its works now rambling over more than two miles (3 km) of shoreline and spilling over into the nearby town of Hamburg. Lackawanna Steel paid about 75 percent of the taxes in the city of Lackawanna, effectively controlling city government.

In 1922, Lackawanna Steel reported very large deficits, driven primarily by the huge New York steel mill's aging equipment.

== Bethlehem Steel years ==
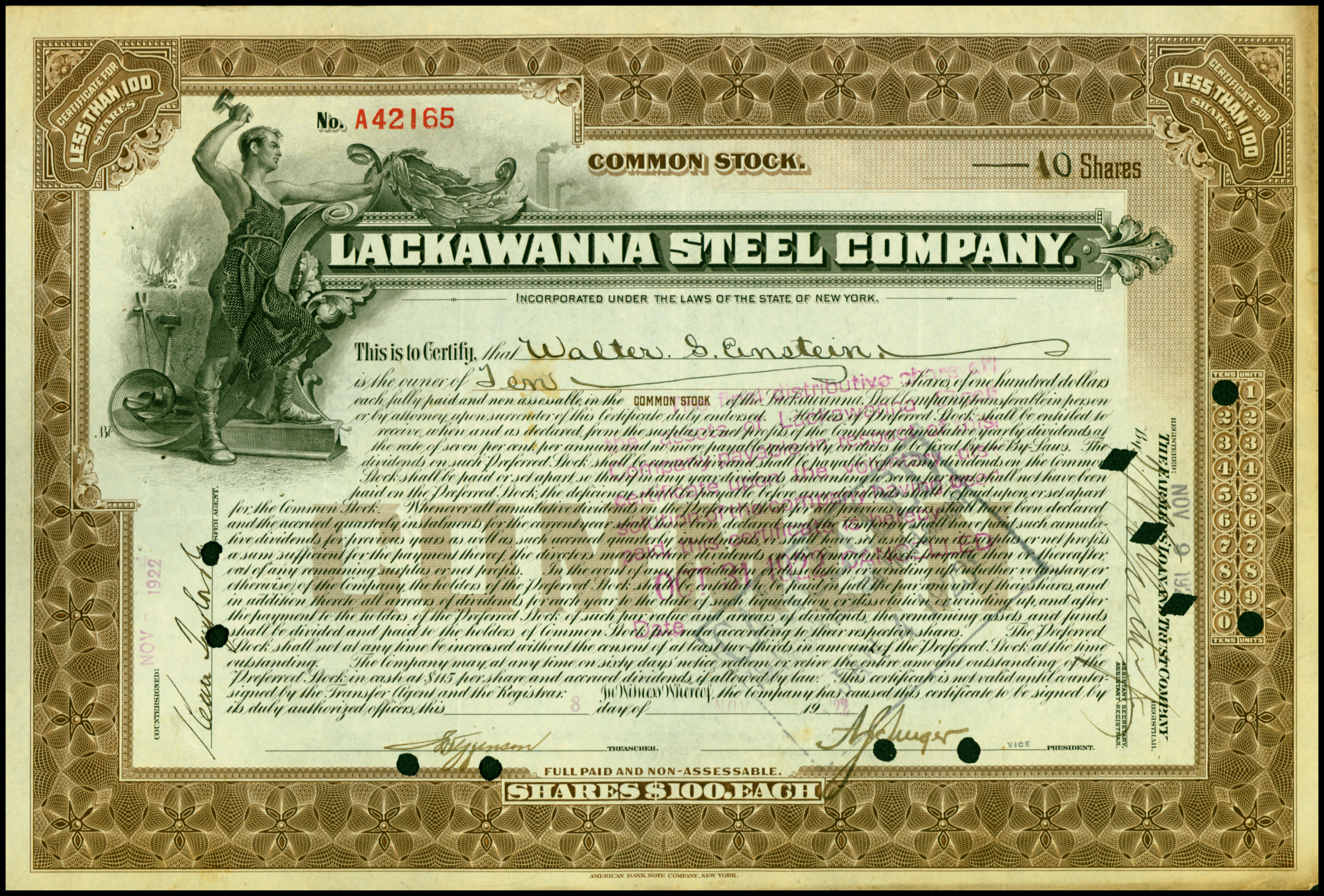
Share of the Lackawanna Steel Company, issued 8. November 1922

In 1922, Lackawanna Steel Co. was acquired by the Bethlehem Steel Company, ending the company's 62-year independence. Merger rumors had plagued the company for several years by then. Rumors of an impending merger among two or more of the "Little Steel" companies—the seven steel companies largest in size next to U.S. Steel—continued in November and December 1921 and into 1922. In late April 1922, the seven "Little Steel" firms began to openly discuss the merger of two or more of the companies as a means of challenging U.S. Steel. The chief executives and creditors of these firms visited one another's plants in order to appraise them and assess the financial viability of each company. Among those visited was the Lackawanna Steel Company plant in upstate New York.

On May 11, 1922, Lackawanna Steel announced it had agreed to be purchased by Bethlehem Steel in a merger which would create a billion-dollar company. Bethlehem Steel said it would spend $10 million improving the Lackawanna mills, which were described as "obsolete" due to a lack of investment. The combined company controlled about 10 percent of the steel output of the United States, while U.S. Steel controlled about 45 percent.

A lengthy antitrust investigation followed. The United States Senate asked the Federal Trade Commission (FTC) and the Justice Department to investigate the merger the day after it was announced, which the FTC did on May 14. As the merger was approved by the two companies in mid-May, the Senate and FTC each conducted separate investigations. On June 5, 1922, the FTC issued a report concluding that the merger was in violation of the Sherman Antitrust Act. However, United States Attorney General Harry M. Daugherty overruled the FTC on June 22. The merger finally took effect on October 10, 1922. Six decades later, financial analysts observed that Bethlehem Steel probably purchased Lackawanna Steel for less than half what the company was worth. Over the next decade, Bethlehem Steel spent more than $40 million modernizing the Lackawanna site.

Lackawanna continued to be a center for the manufacture of steel throughout most of the 20th century. In the 1940s, the Lackawanna steel mill employed over 20,000 people, and was the world's largest steel factory.

== Decline ==
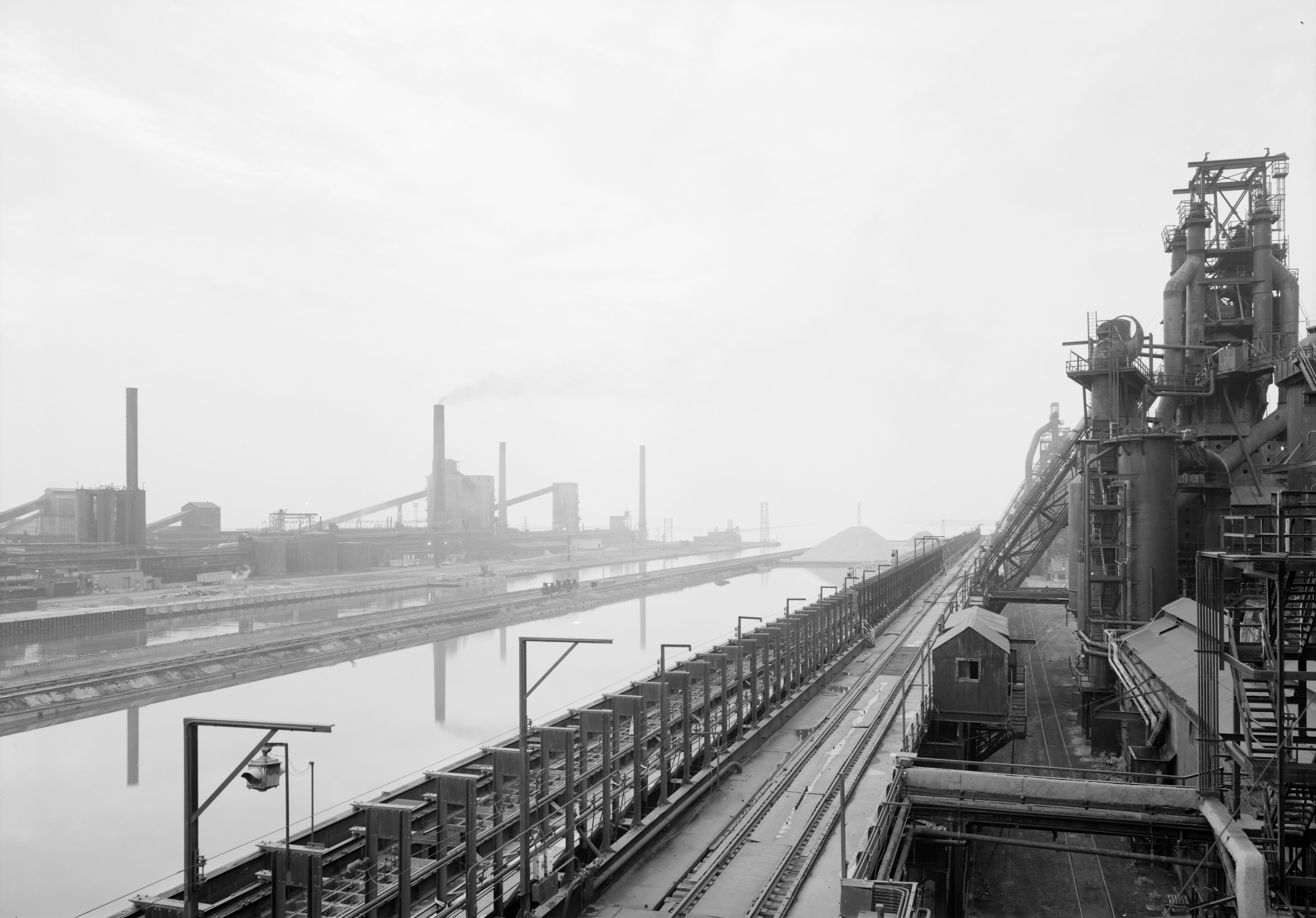
Lackawanna Steel Co. plant at Lackawanna, New York, c. 1968. This image looks south-southeast along the ship canal.

In the 1970s and 1980s, Bethlehem Steel allowed the Lackawanna Steel plant to become obsolete. Foreign competition made it financially impossible to continue to manufacture most of the products produced at Lackawanna. Bethlehem Steel also disliked the high tax rates of the state of New York, and did not want to spend the millions of dollars in air and water pollution abatement which were required by state and federal authorities. The company built a new facility in Burns Harbor, Indiana, and stopped investing in new steel production methods at Lackawanna.

In 1982, Bethlehem Steel announced the closing of nearly all production at the Lackawanna Steel plant in New York. Bethlehem Steel, like many American steel companies, was encountering significant financial problems. Although the company made several public attempts to reassess the plant's viability and keep the plant open in the late 1970s, closure was a foregone conclusion for many. On June 25, 1982, Bethlehem Steel announced it would close the Lackawanna facility and lay off its remaining 10,000 workers in six weeks. The news meant the laying off of an additional 8,000 workers in Lackawanna, West Seneca, and Buffalo. An attempt was made to interest the Buffalo-based Gibraltar Steel Corporation in the plant, but this effort failed.

The Lackawanna Steel plant stopped most of its operations on October 15, 1982. The company laid off workers in waves before the final closure, and transferred many others. On the day the plant stopped most of its operations, more than 6,000 workers lost their jobs (most of them high-paying). The city of Lackawanna's 22,700 people faced extremely large tax increases just to maintain basic services, as the amount of taxes paid by Bethlehem Steel fell from 66 percent of the city's revenue to just 8 percent. In addition, the city owed the company more than $5 million in tax overcharges. The United Steelworkers later successfully sued Bethlehem Steel for prematurely terminating the fringe benefits of the laid-off steelworkers.

== Steel production after 1982 ==
Bethlehem Steel, which maintained a small presence in Lackawanna after the mass layoffs in 1982, ended coke production at the Lackawanna site in 2001, leaving a galvanized steel finishing plant employing about 250 people. Upon Bethlehem's bankruptcy in 2003, the plant was acquired by International Steel Group. It merged with Mittal Steel Company in 2004. In 2006, the plant came under the ownership of ArcelorMittal, which eventually ended its operations at Lackawanna in 2009.

In 1993, Veritas Capital purchased one of the bar, rod and wire plants from Bethlehem and began manufacturing automobile steering columns under its subsidiary, Bar Technologies. This operation has since been taken over by Republic Steel, which manufactures hot rolled bars and coils and employed 270 people in 2018. This plant, which was shut down in 2023, represented the last steel production in former Bethlehem facilities in Lackawanna.

Welded Tube, a Canadian owned manufacturer of steel tubing, built and opened a new plant in 2013 in the western portion of the facility.

=== Fires ===
Three small fires struck the former Lackawanna works between 2014 and 2016. The first fire occurred in 2014, with additional fires in February and October 2016. All three fires occurred at a mulch-grinding facility owned and operated by Zoladz Construction.

On November 9, 2016, a massive fire struck the Industrial Materials Recycling facility located in the plant's former galvanizing, cold mill, and hot mill buildings. The fire, which began at about 7 AM after a lightbulb exploded over flammable materials, was fought by more than 100 firefighters from Lackawanna, Buffalo, and Hamburg. Several explosions were caused by the fire, which collapsed the roof of the structure and caused other heavy damage to it. Federal and state environmental officials rushed to the scene to monitor health hazards from the blaze, which caused the evacuation of a nearby neighborhood due to fire and the closure of two elementary schools due to smoke dangers. Burning debris fell on the city of Lackawanna and town of Hamburg. The fire was contained but still burning on the morning of November 10, requiring the continued evacuation of the neighborhood and the schools.

== Redevelopment ==
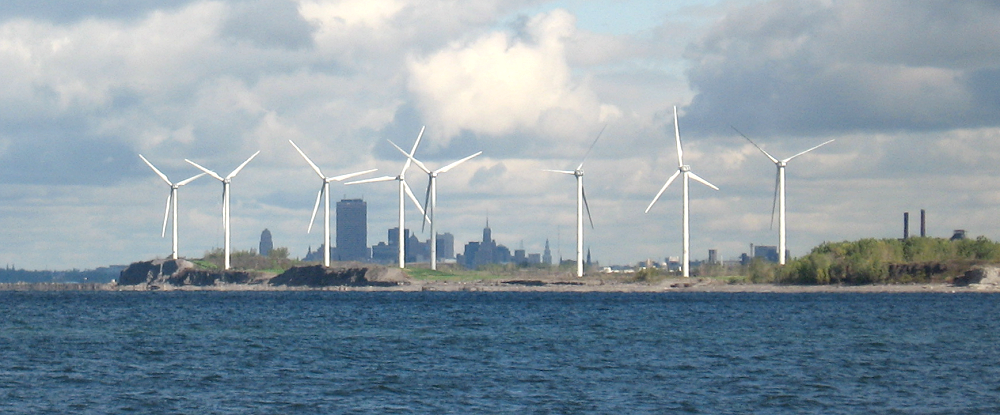
Steel Winds, a wind farm built in 2006 on the former slag heap of the Lackawanna Steel Co. plant in Lackawanna, New York.

The Lackawanna Steel plant was declared a Superfund site by the Environmental Protection Agency (EPA) in 1988 after the EPA conducted a Resource Conservation and Recovery Act (RCRA) Facility Assessment of the plant. The state of New York subsequently declared it a Class 2 Inactive Hazardous Waste Site, indicating the site poses a significant potential threat to human health and the environment. In August 1990, Bethlehem Steel (operating as Tecumseh Redevelopment, Inc.) and the EPA entered into an administrative consent order requiring Bethlehem Steel to identify the nature and extent of any releases of hazardous waste and mitigate any emergency situations that might be discovered during the course of the investigations. Bethlehem Steel and its successor corporations have been submitting RCRA Facility Investigation (RFI) reports since then. Although the RFI was due to be completed in 2004, it still was not complete as of June 2008. The plant was also declared a brownfield in 2003 under the Small Business Liability Relief and Brownfields Revitalization Act of 2002. While this made the city of Lackawanna eligible for federal assistance money to redevelop part of the site, a cooperative agreement had not been signed as of May 2006.

The city of Lackawanna redeveloped some of the former Lackawanna Steel plant land into small business zones, bringing about 700 jobs back to the town in the late 1980s.

Steel Winds, an eight-windmill wind farm owned by BQ Energy, opened on the old plant's slag heaps in September 2006. Another six turbines were added in 2012.

As of 2018, Erie County owns 240 acres of the complex. 140 acres of former brownfield have been remediated, and a bike path now spans a portion of the property.

== Historic sites ==
The Lackawanna Steel Company's original stone furnaces near Scranton, Pennsylvania, were placed on the National Register of Historic Places in 1991.

In addition to the original stone furnaces near Scranton, a number of the company's other construction projects are listed on the National Register of Historic Places. These include:

- Bridge (Royal, Nebraska), Township Road over unnamed stream, 6.8 miles northeast of Royal, Nebraska (Lackawanna Steel Co.)
- Bridge 9, Shawville Road, Sheldon, Vermont (Lackawanna Steel Construction Co.)
- Garretson Outlet Bridge, County Roadd K64 over Garretson Outlet Ditch, Whiting, Iowa (Lackawanna Steel Co.)
- Mallory Township Bridge, County Road over unnamed stream, Osterdock, Iowa (Lackawanna Steel Co.)
- Neligh Mill Bridge, Elm Street over the Elkhorn River, Neligh, Nebraska (Cambria/Lackawanna Steel Cos.)
- North Loup Bridge, County Road over the North Loup River, 1.5 miles northeast of North Loup, Nebraska (Cambria & Lackawanna Steel Cos.)
- Ponca Creek Bridge, County Road over Ponca Creek, 3 miles east of Lynch, Nebraska (Lackawanna Steel Co.)
- Quarry Bridge, County Road I-4 over Iowa Road, Marshalltown, Iowa (Lackawanna Steel, King and Twiss)

== Lackawanna Steel in popular culture ==
In 2001, the Tony Award-winning actor and playwright Ruben Santiago-Hudson wrote Lackawanna Blues, a one-man play which depicts a fictionalized version of the playwright's childhood growing up in Lackawanna, New York. The play, which won two OBIE awards, features a number of characters who work or worked at the Lackawanna Steel Co. plant, and the company's role in the town is discussed several times in the play.

== See also ==
- Bethlehem Steel topics
- Ironworks and steel mills in Pennsylvania
