= Western Bridge and Construction Company =

The Western Bridge and Construction Company, located in Omaha, Nebraska, was one of the foremost bridge engineering and manufacturing companies in the Midwestern United States. Several of their bridges are now listed on the National Register of Historic Places. Their headquarters were located in the Bee Building in Downtown Omaha.

A number of its bridges are listed on the National Register of Historic Places.

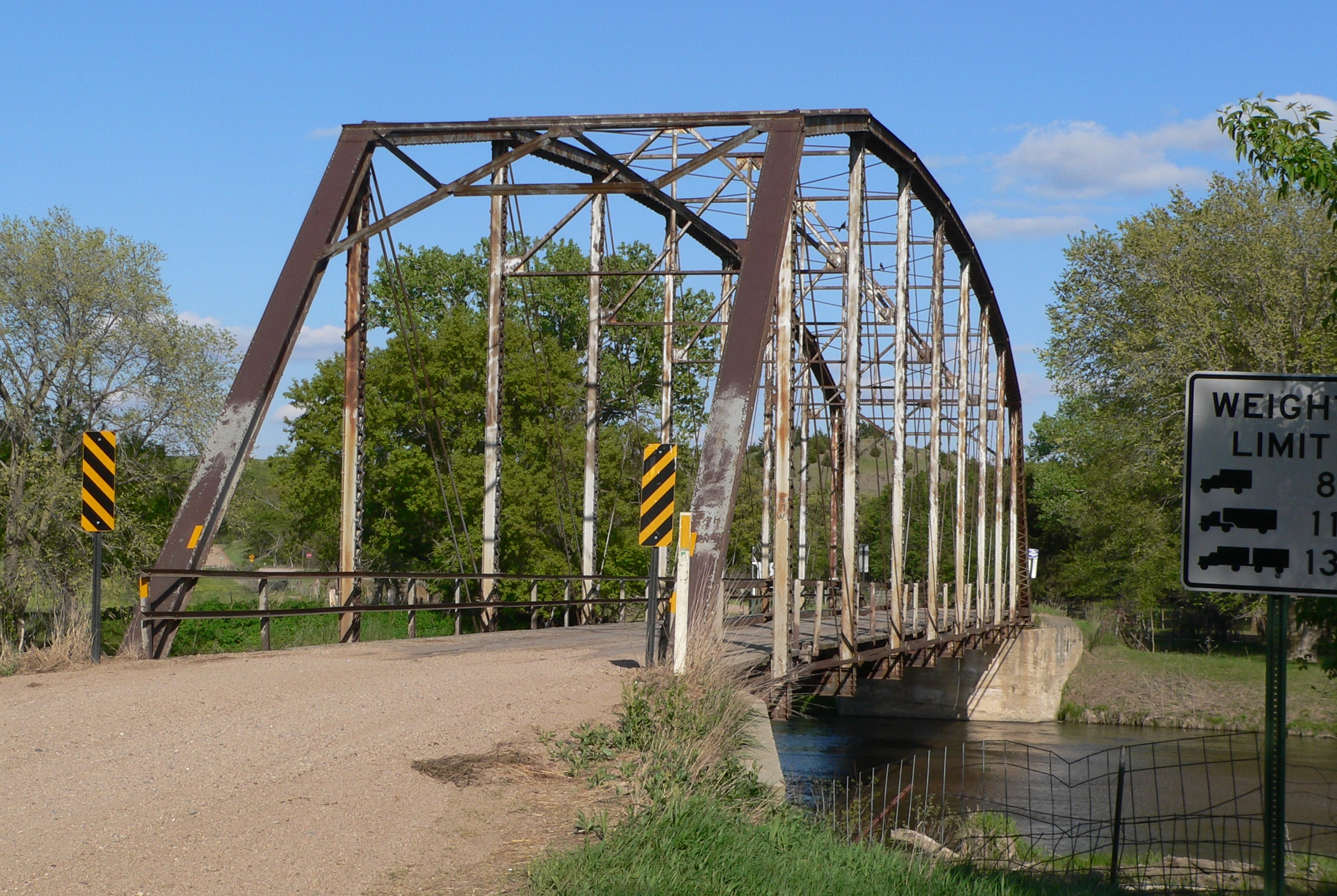
Gross State Aid Bridge

There are two Western bridges in Garden County, Nebraska, including the Lisco State Aid Bridge near Lisco, Nebraska and Lewellen State Aid Bridge in Lewellen, Nebraska. The Lewellen and Lisco bridges are the only remaining intact examples of state aid pony trusses in Nebraska, and the Lisco Bridge is significant as one of the last remaining structures from the state aid bridge program.

Works include:

- Fair Oaks Bridge, Fair Oaks, California
- Elkhorn River Bridge, Antelope County, Nebraska
- Kingpost truss Bridge, Royal, Nebraska
- Gross State Aid Bridge, Verdigre, Nebraska
- Bridge, 6.8 mi. NE of Royal Royal, NE (Western Bridge & Construction Co.), formerly NRHP-listed
- ENP Bridge over Green River, Cty. Rd. CN23-145 Daniel, WY (Western Bridge & Const. Co.), NRHP-listed
- Gross State Aid Bridge, Co. Hwy. over Verdigris Cr., 3.5 mi. N, .2 mi. W of Verdigre Verdigre, NE (Western Bridge & Construction Co.
- Hospital Bridge, Upper Main St. over Downie River, Downieville, California (Western Bridge & Construction Co.), NRHP-listed
- Klondike Bridge, 180th St. over Big Sioux River, in Lyon County, Iowa and Lincoln County, South Dakota near Larchwood, IA (Western Bridge and Construction Co.), NRHP-listed
- Neligh Mill (Boundary Increase), Irregular Tracks in Block 22, Original Town, Neligh and the N1/2 of the SE1/4 of Section 20, T25N, R6W Neligh, NE (Western Bridge And Construction Co.), NRHP-listed
- Neligh Mill Bridge, Elm St. over the Elkhorn R., Neligh, NE (Western Bridge & Construction Co.), NRHP-listed
- Onion Creek Bridge, Over Onion Creek, S of Coffeyville Coffeyville, KS (Western Bridge Co.), NRHP-listed
- Palisades Bridge, 25495 485th Ave. Garretson, SD (Western Bridge & Construction Co.), NRHP-listed
- Pennsylvania Avenue Rock Creek Bridge, Pennsylvania Ave. over Rock Creek Independence, KS (Western Bridge Co.), NRHP-listed
- South Dakota Department of Transportation Bridge No. 50-193-086, Local Rd. over Big Sioux R. (Sverdrup Township) Midway, SD (Western Bridge and Construction Co.), NRHP-listed
- South Dakota Dept. of Transportation Bridge No. 16-570-054, Local rd. over Oak Cr. McLaughlin, SD (Western Bridge & Construction Co.), NRHP-listed
- South Dakota Dept. of Transportation Bridge No. 64-061-199, Local rd. over Brule Cr., Elk Point, SD (Western Bridge and Construction Co.), NRHP-listed
- Verdigris Creek Bridge, Twp. Rd. over Verdigris Cr., 1.9 mi. NE of Royal Royal, NE (Western Bridge & Construction Co., NRHP-listed

== See also ==
- Standard Bridge Company, another Nebraska bridge building company
- Economy of Omaha
