= Verdigris Creek Bridge =

- U.S. National Register of Historic Places
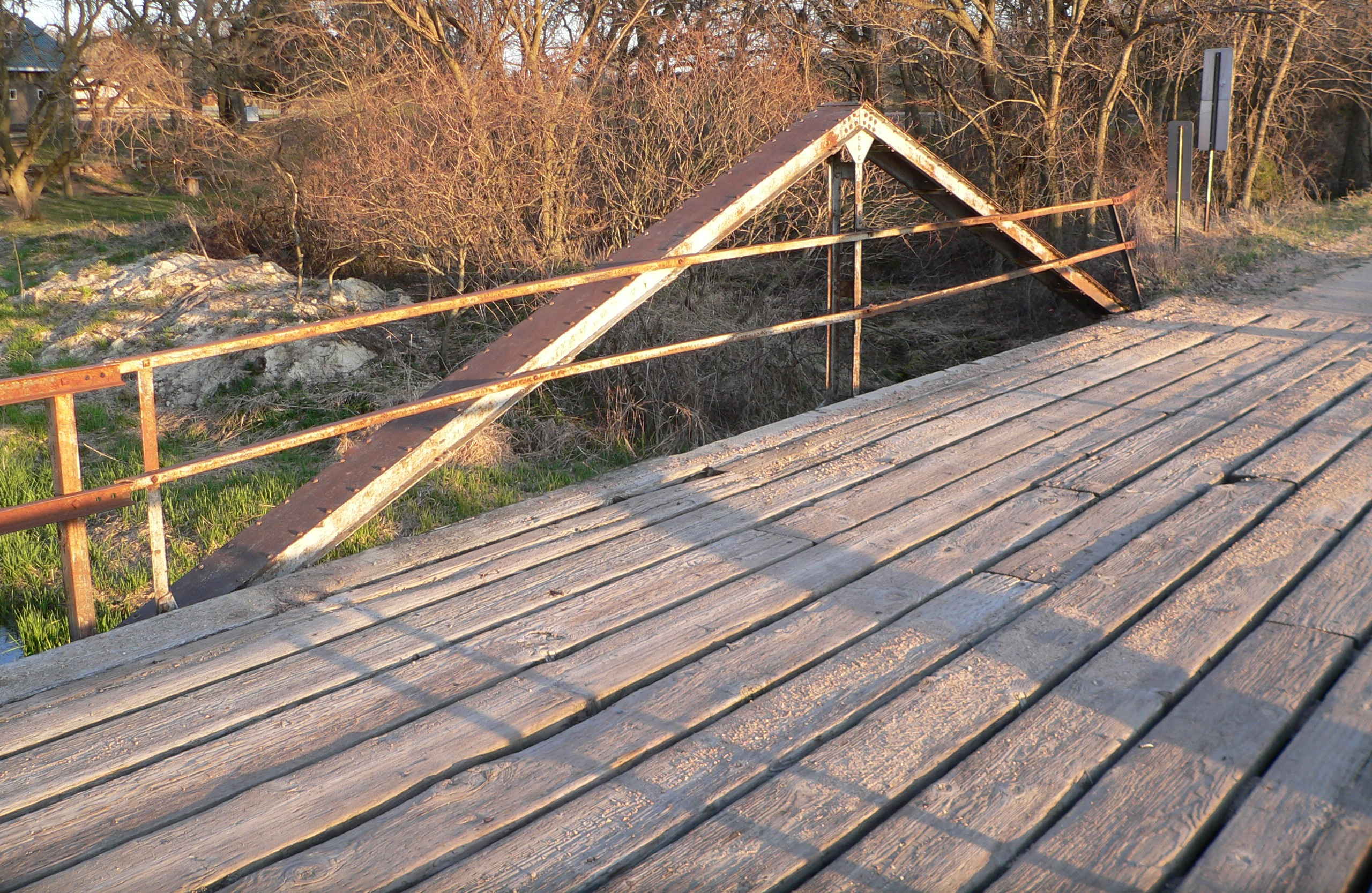

- Location within Nebraska Location within the United States
- Location: Township road over Verdigris Creek, 1.9 miles northeast of Royal in Antelope County, Nebraska
- Coordinates: 42.358611°N 98.106389°W
- Area: less than one acre
- Built: c.1918
- Built by: Western Bridge & Construction Co.
- Architectural style: Kingpost pony truss
- MPS: Highway Bridges in Nebraska MPS
- NRHP reference No.: 92000770
- Added to NRHP: June 29, 1992

Verdigris Creek Bridge in Antelope County, Nebraska near Royal, Nebraska was built in about 1918. It was listed on the National Register of Historic Places in 1992. It is also denoted NEHBS No. AP00-253.

It is a Kingpost pony truss bridge which probably was built by the Western Bridge & Construction Co. It was well preserved when listed on the National Register and was then the last of just two surviving kingpost truss bridges in the state.

The other one, also in Antelope County, designated NEHBS No. APOO-252 and also NRHP-listed, seems no longer to exist.
