= Bridge (Royal, Nebraska) =

- Formerly listed on the U.S. National Register of Historic Places
- Location within Nebraska Location within the United States
- Nearest city: Royal, Nebraska
- Coordinates: 42°24′50″N 98°4′2″W
- Area: less than one acre
- Built: 1911
- Built by: Lackawanna Steel Co.; Western Bridge & Construction Co.
- Architectural style: Kingpost pony truss
- MPS: Highway Bridges in Nebraska MPS
- NRHP reference No.: 92000725

Significant dates
- Added to NRHP: June 29, 1992
- Removed from NRHP: March 25, 2019

The Bridge designated NEHBS No. AP00-252 near Royal, Nebraska built in 1911 was listed on the National Register of Historic Places in 1992. It brought a township road over an unnamed stream, about 6.8 miles (10.9 km) northeast of Royal. The bridge was fabricated by the Lackawanna Steel Co. and built by the Western Bridge & Construction Co. of Omaha, Nebraska at cost of $1,149. It was a Kingpost pony truss bridge with span length of 30 feet (9.1 m), total length of 32 feet (9.8 m), and roadway width of 16 feet (4.9 m).

When listed on the National Register, it was one of the last two surviving kingpost truss bridges in the state; the other was the Verdigris Creek Bridge (c.1918), also in Antelope County near Royal. It seems that the bridge no longer exists. The site is not listed on Nebraska State Historical Society's website. It was delisted from the National Register in 2019.

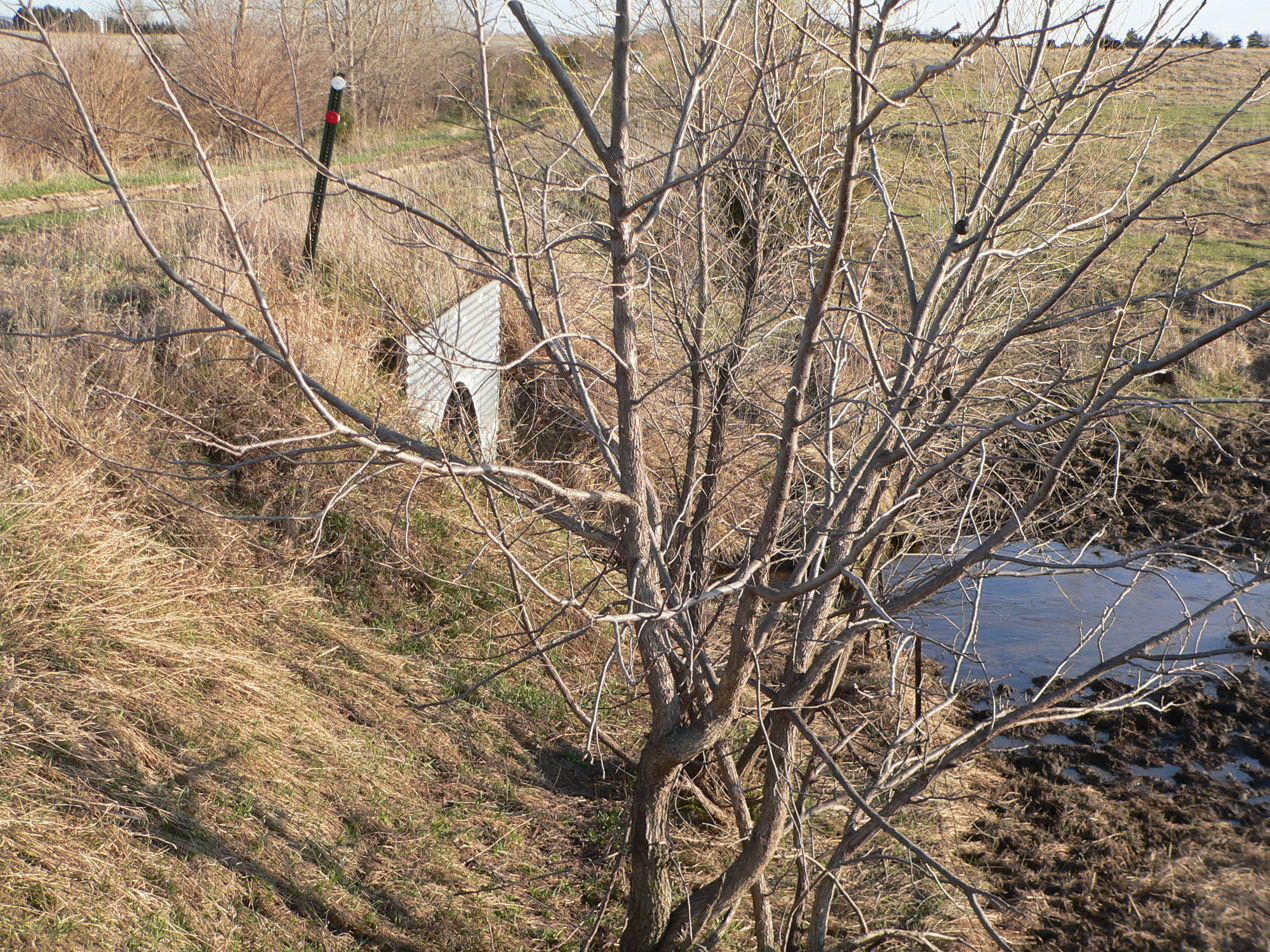
Crossing on 522 Av N of 868 Rd
