= Hospital Bridge =

- U.S. National Register of Historic Places
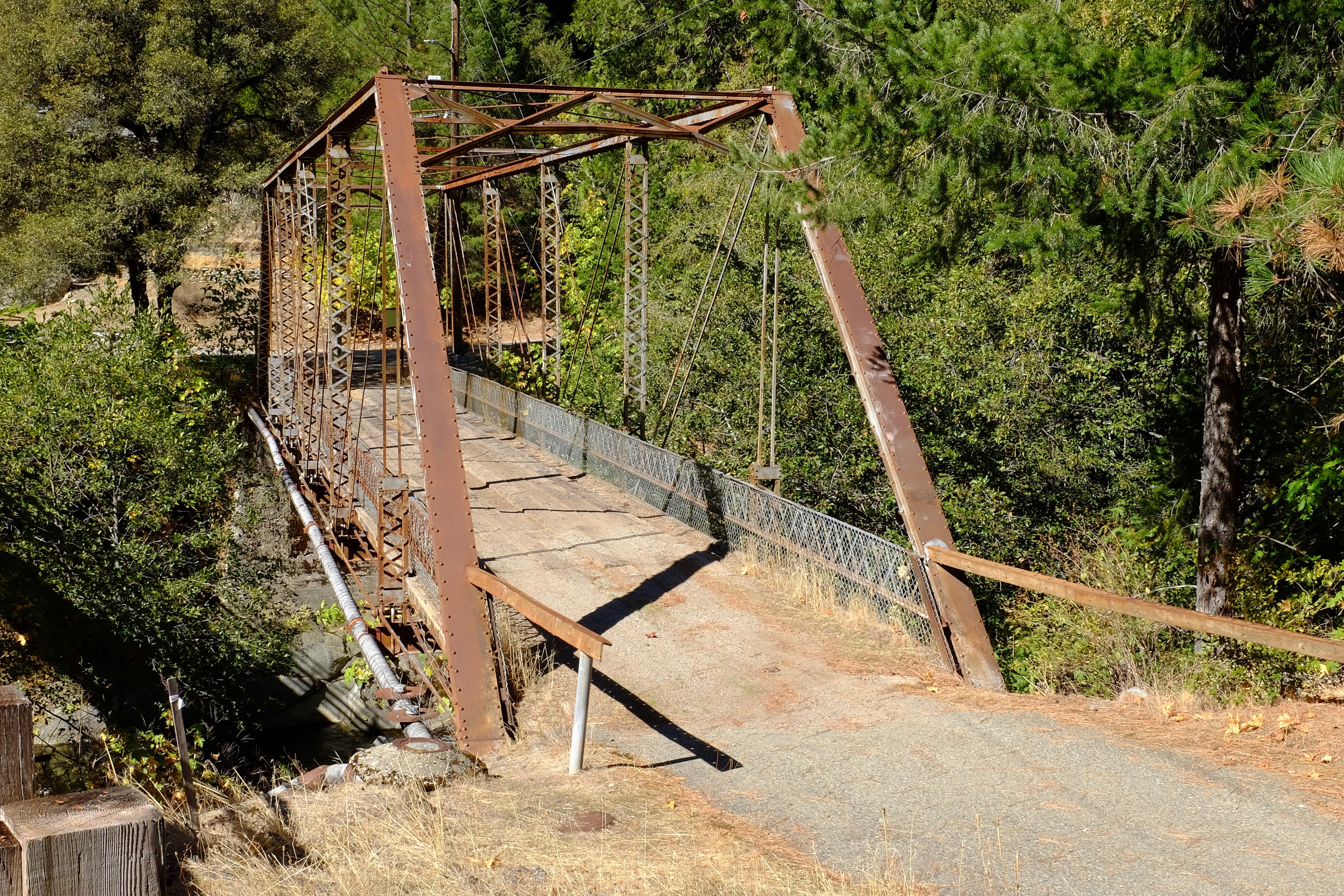

- Location within California
- Location: Upper Main St. over Downie R., Downieville, California
- Coordinates: 39°34′11″N 120°49′21″W
- Area: 1 acre (0.40 ha)
- Built: 1910
- Built by: Western Bridge and Construction Company; George F. Taylor,
- Architectural style: Through Pratt Truss
- MPS: Highway Bridges of California MPS
- NRHP reference No.: 12000400
- Added to NRHP: July 10, 2012

Hospital Bridge, in Downieville, California, was built in 1910. It brings Upper Main St. over the Downie River. It was listed on the National Register of Historic Places in 2012.

== History ==
The Hospital Bridge is a through Pratt truss bridge built or fabricated by the Western Bridge and Construction Company. George F. Taylor is associated. Added The bridge is also known as Downieville Bridge or Downie River Bridge.

The bridge was bypassed in 1986 with a new bridge that runs parallel to it. In 2017 the Hospital Bridge was for use by pedestrians only.

== See also ==
- National Register of Historic Places listings in Sierra County, California
- List of bridges on the National Register of Historic Places in California
