= Empire Creek =

Empire Creek may refer to -

Rivers

- Empire Creek (Downie River), a tributary of the Downie River, California, USA
- Empire Creek (Murrieta Creek), a tributary of Murrieta Creek, California

Ships

- MV Empire Creek, a British coaster in service 1941-46
