= Pordum =

Pordum is a surname. Notable people with this surname include:

- Francis J. Pordum (born 1945), American politician
- Frederick F. Pordum (born 1934), American politician
