= Abdulsalam Noman =

American politician

Abdulsalam K. Noman

Member of the Lackawanna City Council from the 1st ward
- In office March 5, 2018 – January 1, 2019
- Preceded by: Vacant
- Succeeded by: John E. Ingram
- In office January 1, 2010 – January 1, 2017
- Preceded by: Andrea Z. Haxton
- Succeeded by: Vacant

Personal details
- Born: Abdulsalam Kassim Noman Yemen
- Party: Democratic
- Spouse: Fatima
- Children: 4
- Relatives: Yaseinn Taher (nephew)
- Education: University at Buffalo
- Occupation: Teacher's aide, soccer coach, politician

Abdulsalam K. Noman is a Yemeni-American politician and soccer coach. He is the first Yemeni-American elected to public office in the state of New York, and the second in the United States.

== Early life and career ==
Born in Yemen, Noman emigrated to the United States with his mother and a sister to escape the Yemenite War of 1972.

His father, Kassim, came to Lackawanna, New York in 1975. Kassim worked for Bethlehem Steel.

He graduated from Lackawanna High School and attended the University at Buffalo in 1986.

Returning to his alma mater, he became a teacher's aide and the varsity soccer coach at Lackawanna High School.

== Lackawanna Six ==
Six Yemeni-American men from Lackawanna's first ward traveled from the United States to Afghanistan in spring 2001, before the September 11 attacks, while the country was still ruled by the Taliban. Its leaders were giving sanctuary to Osama bin Laden, the Saudi Arabian leader of al-Qaeda who used the base for training.

One of the "Buffalo Six" who went to Afghanistan was Yaseinn Taher, the nephew of Noman. News outlets from across he nation interviewed Noman, who had coached five of the six men while they played soccer for Lackawanna High School.

He became critical of his nephew's prison sentence after meeting with Taher and asking him to accept the government's plea deal. Noman characterized his nephew's trip as a "foolish mistake."

Reportedly, Taher came back to Lackawanna and told Noman, "Uncle, I appreciate this country [the United States] more than any other time ... it was a waste of time; we didn't learn anything."

== Lackawanna City Council ==
With the Yemenite population in Lackawanna's first ward increasing, Noman ran for the first ward's councilmanic seat on the Lackawanna City Council in 2009. He defeated incumbent Andrea Z. Haxton.

With his election to the council, he became the first Yemeni-American elected to public office in New York State, and only the second elected in the United States.

He went on to win re-election in 2013, in a rematch with Haxton.

Not running for council again in 2017, he supported local businessman Mohamed Albanna to be his successor. Albanna plead guilty to a felony count of running an illegal money transfer business in 2002, when he wired five million dollars to Yemen under the Patriot Act.

Albanna was convicted in 2006. Lackawanna City Charter states that anyone who is a felon may not hold elected office in the city of Lackawanna.

When it was ruled that Albanna was not eligible to serve, Noman successfully lobbied to get appointed to his former position. He later lost his bid to keep the council seat later that year, running as a write-in candidate.
