= Klondike Bridge =

- U.S. National Register of Historic Places
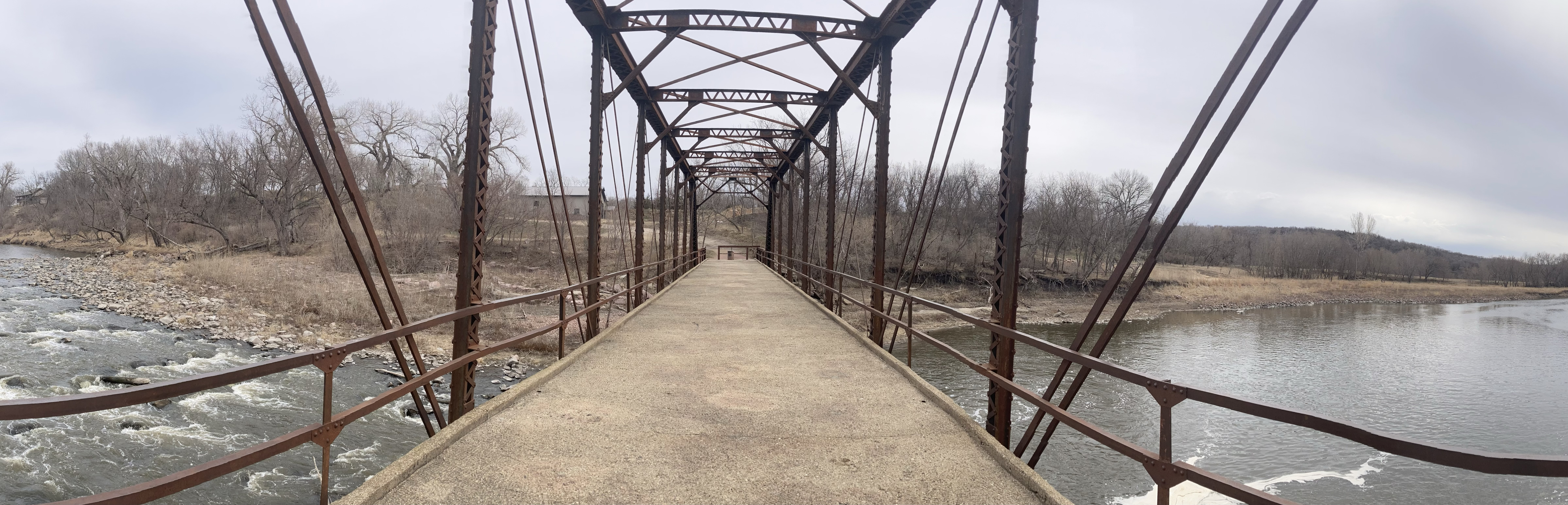
- Klondike Bridge in 2024

- Location within Iowa Location within the United States
- Location: 180th St. over the Big Sioux River
- Nearest city: Larchwood, Iowa
- Coordinates: 43°23′09″N 96°31′18″W
- Area: less than one acre
- Built: 1914
- Built by: Western Bridge and Construction Company
- Architect: Iowa State Highway Commission
- Architectural style: Pratt through truss Warren pony truss
- MPS: Highway Bridges of Iowa MPS
- NRHP reference No.: 98000510
- Added to NRHP: May 15, 1998

The Klondike Bridge is located in the ghost town of Klondike, which is located to the southwest of Larchwood, Iowa, United States. The 260-foot (79 m) span carried traffic on 180th Street over the Big Sioux River. The bridge was first constructed at this point in 1901, but it proved inadequate to handle the traffic that followed, so in 1913 Lyon County hired the Western Bridge and Omaha Construction Company to create the Klondike. The Iowa Legislature passed the Brockway Act that required counties to use Iowa State Highway Commission (ISHC) standards for bridge construction rather than the counties acting on their own in 1913. The ISHC spent the next year standardizing plans. It is in this transition period that the Lyon County Board of Supervisors decided to replace an outdated 1901 span at this location. They contracted with the Western Bridge and Construction Company of Omaha, Nebraska to build this bridge. They used a Pratt through truss of their own design for the main span. It was flanked by two Warren pony trusses from the ISHC. In 1914, the structure was completed for $11,586.11. The historical nature of this bridge is derived from its construction in the transition period, and its use of standard and non-standard bridge designs. It was listed on the National Register of Historic Places in 1998. The span has subsequently been abandoned.
