= John H. Gibbons (mayor) =

American socialist

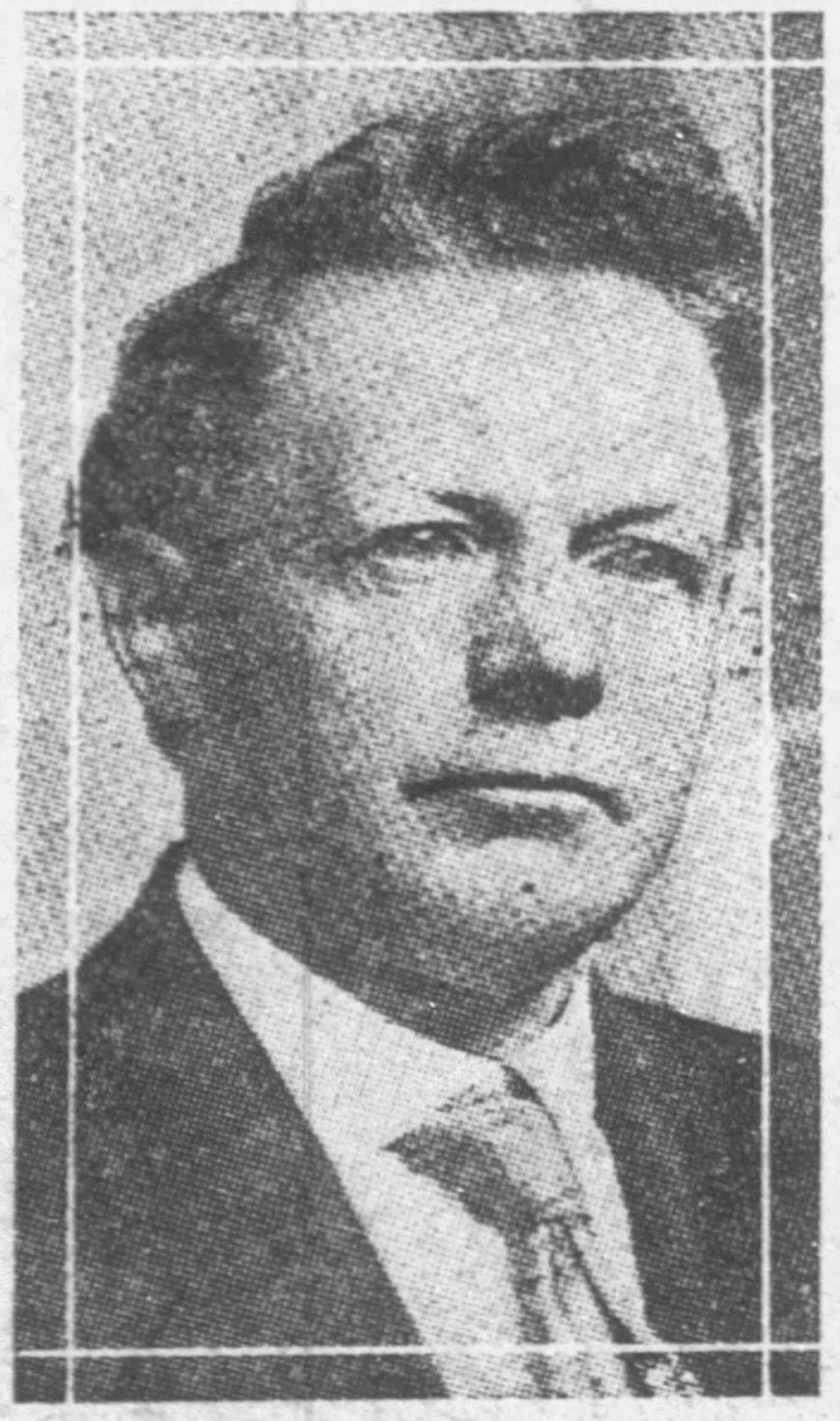
- Gibbons c. 1919

Mayor of Lackawanna
- In office January 1, 1920 – January 1, 1922
- Preceded by: John A. Toomey
- Succeeded by: Michael J. Mescall

Personal details
- Born: April 15, 1869 New York City, New York, U.S.
- Died: May 16, 1949 (aged 80) Lackawanna, New York, U.S.
- Party: Socialist
- Other political affiliations: Democratic (1939)
- Spouse: Anna Smith (m. 1900)
- Children: 3
- Occupation: Railroad switchman
- Known for: First Socialist mayor of Lackawanna

John H. Gibbons (April 15, 1869 – May 16, 1949) was an American railroad switchman and politician who served one term as mayor of Lackawanna, New York. He was Lackawanna's first Socialist mayor, elected in the midst of the 1919 General Steel Strike.
