= South Dakota Dept. of Transportation Bridge No. 16-570-054 =

- U.S. National Register of Historic Places
- Location within South Dakota Location within the United States
- Nearest city: McLaughlin, South Dakota
- Coordinates: 45°52′13″N 100°49′52″W
- Area: less than one acre
- Built: 1911
- Built by: Western Bridge & Construction Co.
- Architectural style: King post, pony truss bridge
- MPS: Historic Bridges in South Dakota MPS
- NRHP reference No.: 93001279
- Added to NRHP: December 9, 1993

South Dakota Dept. of Transportation Bridge No. 16-570-054 in rural Corson County, South Dakota was listed on the National Register of Historic Places in 1993.

It brings a local road over Oak Creek near McLaughlin, South Dakota.

It is a small rural bridge in Corson County, South Dakota. It is a pony truss bridge with king post trusses built by Western Bridge & Construction Co. in 1911.
