= Palisades Bridge =

- U.S. National Register of Historic Places
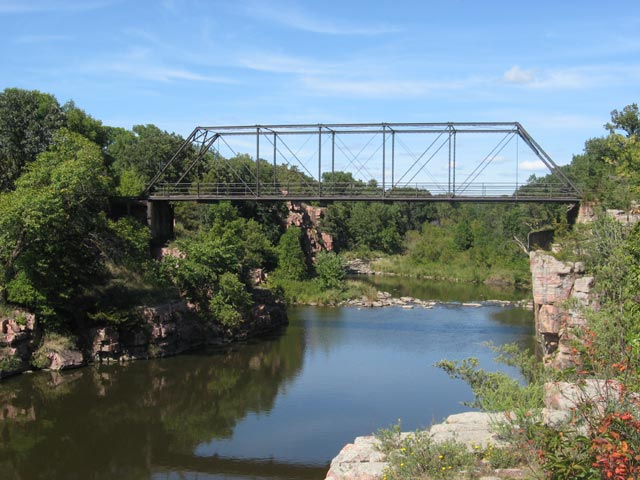
- Palisades Bridge viewed from the south

- Location within South Dakota Location within the United States
- Nearest city: Garretson, South Dakota
- Coordinates: 43°41′20″N 96°31′5″W
- Area: less than one acre
- Built: 1908
- Built by: Western Bridge & Construction Co.
- Architectural style: pin connected Pratt truss
- MPS: Historic Bridges in South Dakota MPS
- NRHP reference No.: 99000687
- Added to NRHP: June 3, 1999

The Palisades Bridge, near Garretson, South Dakota, United States, was built in 1908. Also known as the Palisades State Park Bridge, it is located in Palisades State Park. It is a pin-connected Pratt truss bridge. It was listed on the National Register of Historic Places in 1999.

It was manufactured by the Western Bridge & Construction Co.

It was built to replace an original bridge, built in 1883, which was destroyed by an ice jam in 1896. The bridge is 119 feet (36 m) long and 16 feet (4.9 m) wide. It spans Splitrock Creek across rock cliffs 40 feet (12 m) up from the creek level.
