= Ponca Creek Bridge =

- U.S. National Register of Historic Places
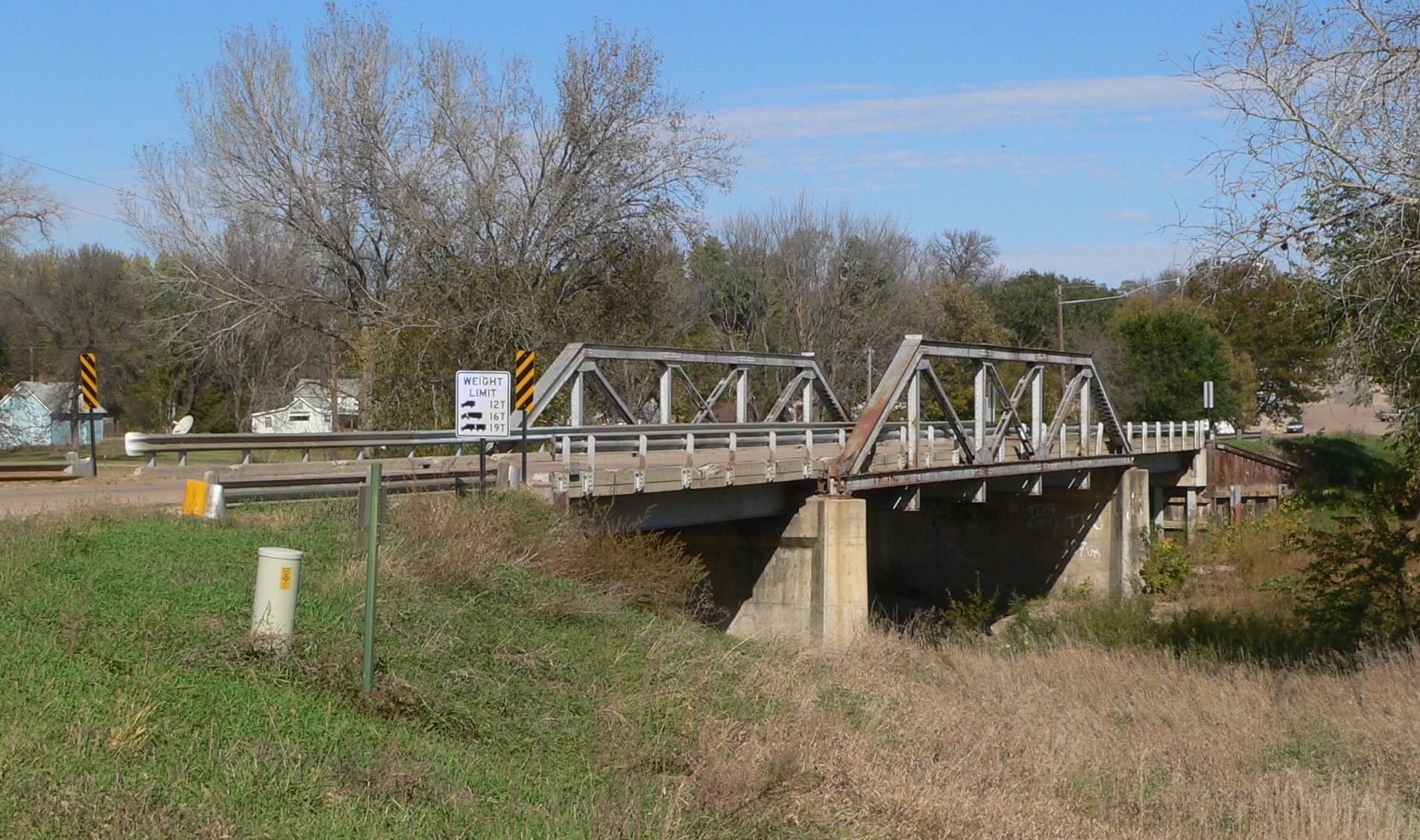

- Location within Nebraska Location within the United States
- Location: County road over Ponca Creek, 3 miles east of Lynch, Nebraska
- Coordinates: 42.82422°N 98.406896°W
- Area: less than one acre
- Built: 1904
- Built by: Lackawanna Steel Co.; E. Roy Townsend
- Architectural style: Pratt half-hip pony truss
- MPS: Highway Bridges in Nebraska MPS
- NRHP reference No.: 92000769
- Added to NRHP: June 29, 1992

The Ponca Creek Bridge, also known as NEHBS No. BD00-224, is a historic Pratt truss bridge spanning Ponca Creek that is listed on the National Register of Historic Places.

The "half-hip" pony truss bridge was built in 1904 as a single-span bridge having a 48 feet (15 m) main span and, with timber stringer approach span having a 79 feet (24 m) total length. Its roadway was 14.3 feet (4.4 m) wide, with timber deck over timber stringers.

The steel bridge was fabricated by Lackawanna Steel Co. of Pittsburgh, Pennsylvania. It was built by E. Roy Townsend of O'Neill, Nebraska.

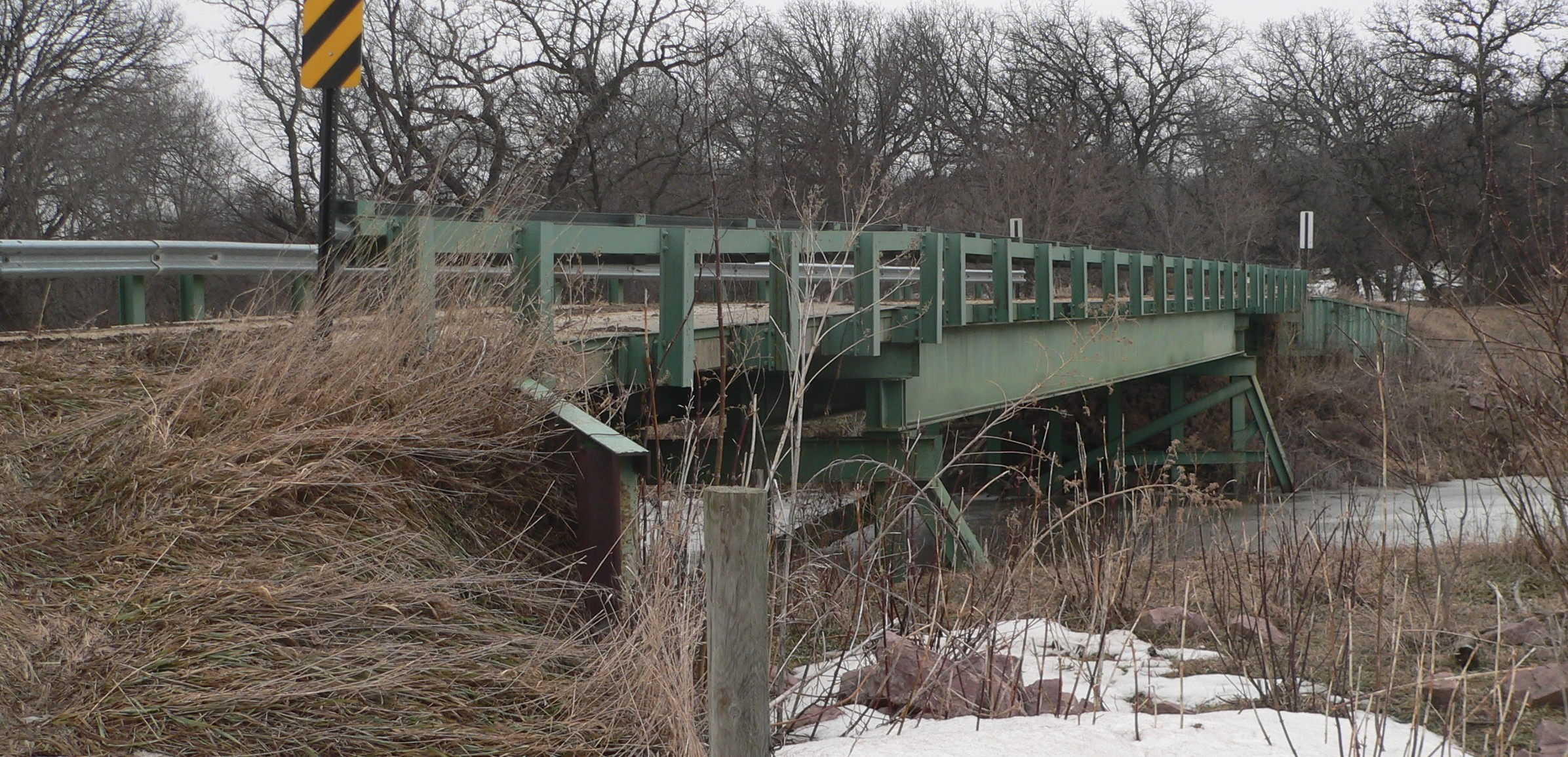
Current bridge at the location

The original bridge may no longer be in place. (Note: See photo of bridge currently at site. According to uglybridges.com, the current bridge was built in 1994.)
