= Lackawanna City School District =

School district in New York, United States

Location
- Lackawanna, New York United States

District information
- Grades: K-12
- Superintendent: Nadia Nashir
- Schools: 4

Students and staff
- Athletic conference: Section VI
- District mascot: Steelers
- Colors: Blue and White

Other information
- Website: www.lackawannaschools.org

Lackawanna City School District is a school district in Lackawanna, New York, United States. The superintendent is Nadia Nashir.

The district operates four schools: Lackawanna High School, Lackawanna Middle School, Martin Road Elementary School, and Truman Elementary School.

== Administration ==
The District offices are located at 245 South Shore Boulevard in Lackawanna. The current Superintendent is Ms. Nadia Nashir.

== Lackawanna High School ==
Lackawanna High School

Location
- 550 Martin Road; Lackawanna, Erie, New York 14218

Information
- Principal: Deborah M. Biastre
- Grades: 9-12
- Website: Lackawanna High School

Lackawanna High School (formerly Lackawanna Secondary Center) is located at 550 Martin Road and serves grades 9 through 12. The current principal is Mrs. Deborah Biastre, and the current assistant principal is Mr. Paul Lyons.

== Lackawanna Middle School ==
Lackawanna Middle School

Location
- 500 Martin Road; Lackawanna, Erie, New York 14218

Information
- Principal: Matteo Anello
- Grades: 6-8
- Website: Lackawanna Middle School

Lackawanna Middle School is located at 500 Martin Road and serves grades 6 through 8. The current principal is Mr. Matteo Anello, and the current assistant principal is Mrs. Julie Clark.

=== History ===
The current Lackawanna Middle School was built in 1986 and opened in 1997, in the old wing of Lackawanna High School. At the time it served Grades 6-9.

== Martin Road School ==
Martin Road School

Location
- 135 Martin Road; Lackawanna, Erie 14218

Information
- Principal: Julie Andreozzi
- Grades: K-5
- Website: Martin Road School

Martin Road School is located at 135 Martin Road and serves grades K through 5. The current principal is Mrs. Julie Andreozzi. The current assistant principal is Mr. Bruce Axelson.

=== History ===
Martin Road Elementary School opened in September 2003, replacing the former Washington and Franklin Schools. It originally served Grades 3-6, before switching to Grades 2-5 for the 2014 school year. Grades K-1 were added in 2016.

== Truman Elementary School ==
Truman Elementary School

Location
- 15 Innerview Drive; Lackawanna, Erie, NY 14218

Information
- Principal: Ashley Wakelee
- Grades: PK-1
- Website: Truman Elementary

Truman Elementary School is located at 15 Innerview Drive and serves grades PK through 1. The current principal is Mrs. Ashley Wakelee.

=== History ===
Truman Elementary was built in 1966 for grades pre-kindergarten to 2, but the second graders were moved to Martin Road Elementary at the start of the 2014-2015 school year.

== Selected former administrators ==
Year	Superintendent	Truman Principal	Martin Rd. Principal	LMS Principal	LHS Principal
1990-1991	Nellie King	Mike Jakubowski*		Ronald Wisher	Bill Bilowus
1991-1992	Nellie King	Nick Korach		Bill Bilowus	
1992-1993	Nellie King	Nick Korach		Bill Bilowus	
1993-1994	Nellie King	Nick Korach		Bill Bilowus	
1994-1995	Nellie King	Mike Jakubowski*		Bill Bilowus	
1995-1996	Nellie King	Nick Korach		Bill Bilowus	
1996-1997	Nellie King	Nick Korach		Bill Bilowus	
1997-1998	Nellie King	Nick Korach		Mike Jaukubowski	Bill Bilowus
1998-1999	Nellie King	Nick Korach		Mike Jaukubowski	Bill Bilowus
1999-2000	Nellie King	Nick Korach		Mike Jaukubowski	Bill Bilowus
2000-2001	Monika Kole	Nick Korach		Mike Jaukubowski	Bill Bilowus
2001-2002	Paul Hashem	Nick Korach		Mike Jaukubowski	Bill Bilowus
2002-2003	Paul Hashem	Nick Korach		Mike Jaukubowski	Craig Pawlak
2003-2004	Paul Hashem	Maureen Fernandez	Tom Mazurek	Mike Jaukubowski	Craig Pawlak
2004-2005	Paul Hashem	Maureen Fernandez	Tom Mazurek	Mike Jaukubowski	Craig Pawlak
2005-2006	Paul Hashem	Maureen Fernandez	Keith Kuwick	Mike Jaukubowski	Peter Hazzan
2006-2007	Paul Hashem	Maureen Fernandez	Keith Kuwick	Mike Jaukubowski	Peter Hazzan
2007-2008	Paul Hashem	Maureen Fernandez	Keith Kuwick	Mike Jaukubowski	Peter Hazzan
2008-2009	Fred Wille	Maureen Fernandez	Jake Taft	Mike Jaukubowski	Peter Hazzan
2009-2010	Fred Wille	Maureen Fernandez	Jake Taft	Mike Jaukubowski	Steve Dimitroff
2010-2011	Nick Corach	Maureen Fernandez	Jake Taft	Mary Hoffman	Steve Dimitroff
2011-2012	Nick Corach	Maureen Fernandez	Jake Taft	Bruce Axelson	Steve Dimitroff
2012-2013	Nick Corach	Maureen Fernandez	Jake Taft	Matt McKenna	Bruce Axelson
2013-2014	Anne Spadone	Angela McCaffrey	Maureen Fernandez	Matt McKenna	Bruce Axelson
2014-2015	Anne Spadone	Angela McCaffrey	Maureen Fernandez	Matt McKenna	Bruce Axelson
2015-2016	Anne Spadone	Angela McCaffrey	Julie Andreozzi	Beth Schill	Bruce Axelson
2016-2017	Anne Spadone	Angela McCaffrey	Julie Andreozzi	Beth Schill	Bruce Axelson
2017-2018	Anne Spadone	Angela McCaffrey	Julie Andreozzi	Beth Schill	Bruce Axelson
2018-2019	Keith Lewis	Andres Arroyo	Fred Hahn	Beth Schill	Deb Biastre
2019-2020	Keith Lewis	Ashley Wakelee	Fred Hahn Matteo Anello	Jennifer Maslakowski	Deb Biastre

== Defunct schools ==
- Bethlehem Park School (1928-1977)
- Franklin School (1923-2003)
- Lincoln School (1925-1988)
- McKinley School
- Ridge/Hoover Junior High School (1906-1980)
- Roosevelt School (1904-1976)
- Washington School (1904-2005)
- Wilson School (1904-1975)
