= Neligh Mill Bridge =

- U.S. National Register of Historic Places
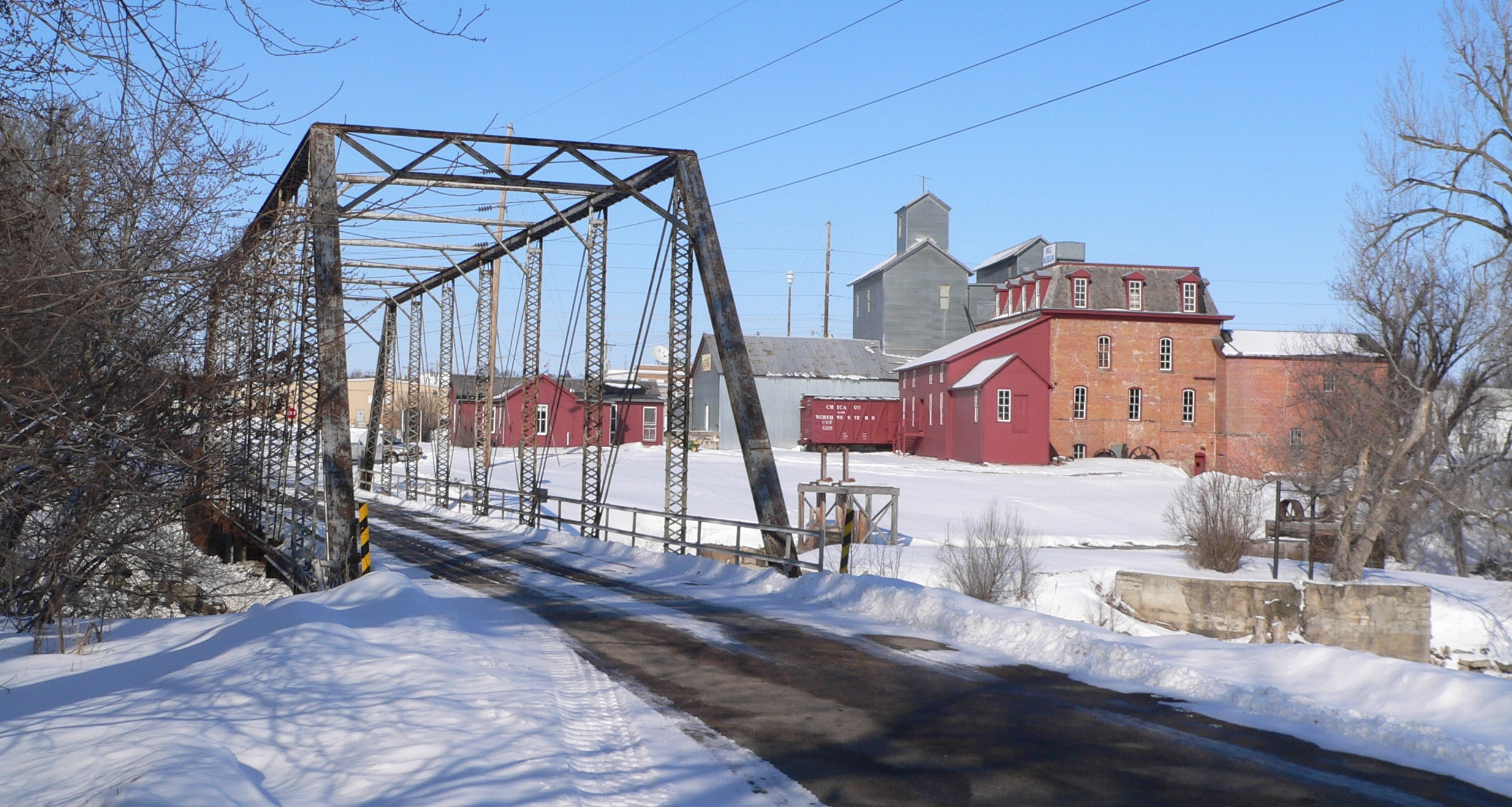

- Location within Nebraska Location within the United States
- Location: Elm St. over the Elkhorn R., Neligh, Nebraska
- Coordinates: 42.125556°N 98.030833°W
- Area: less than one acre
- Built: 1910
- Built by: Western Bridge & Construction Co.; Cambria/Lackawanna Steel Cos.
- Architectural style: Pratt through truss
- MPS: Highway Bridges in Nebraska MPS
- NRHP reference No.: 92000724
- Added to NRHP: June 29, 1992

The Neligh Mill Bridge is a truss bridge which brings Elm St. over the Elkhorn River in Neligh in Antelope County, Nebraska. It was built in 1910 and was listed on the National Register of Historic Places in 1992. It has also been known as the Elm Street Bridge and as Elkhorn River Bridge.

The bridge was damaged by flooding in June 2010. The Antelope County Board of Supervisors voted in April 2011 to remove it, but rescinded this decision in June 2011.

The bridge is located near the Neligh Mill, a historic site owned by the Nebraska Historical Society. There once was a wagon bridge on the site which was replaced by a truss bridge in 1884. That was replaced by this bridge in 1910. The bridge is a 140 feet (43 m) pinned Pratt through truss bridge (140 feet span with 145 feet total length) built by the Western Bridge and Construction Company of Omaha, which had Antelope County's annual contract for 1910. It is built upon steel cylinder piers.

Its NRHP nomination states that the Neligh Mill Bridge "is technologically significant as an early, well-preserved example of the pinned Pratt through truss: a mainstay structural type for wagon bridges built throughout Nebraska between the 1880s and the 1920s."
