= Lackawanna, New York =

Lackawanna Lèkaohane (Delaware)
- City
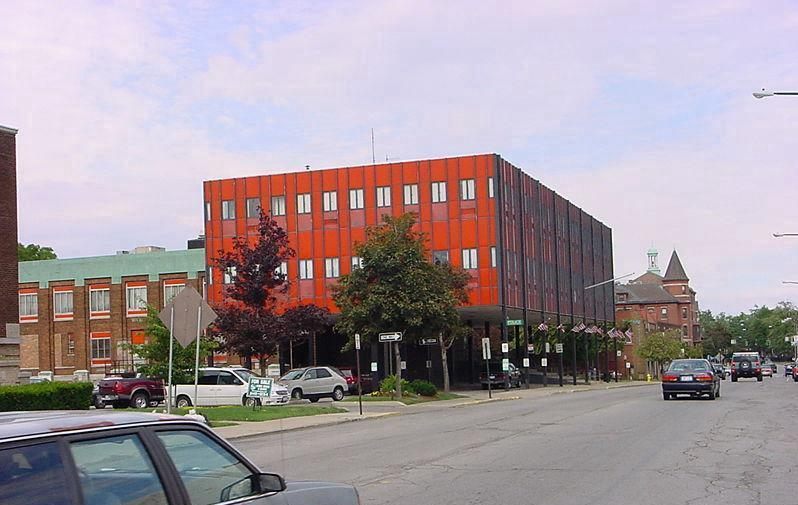
- Lackawanna City Hall

- Flag Seal

- Location of Lackawanna in Erie County and New York

- Location within New York
- Coordinates: 42°49′10″N 78°49′32″W
- Country: United States
- State: New York
- County: Erie
- Established: 1909
- Named for: Lackawanna County, Pennsylvania

Government
  - Type: Mayor-Council
  - Mayor: Annette Iafallo (D)
  - City Council: Members' List: President: • Frederic J. Marrano (D); • W1: John Ingram (D); • W2: Geoffrey Szymanski (D); • W3: Dean J. Moretti (D); • W4: Kevin R. Surdyke (D)

Area
  - City: 6.60 sq mi (17.09 km^{2})
  - Land: 6.55 sq mi (16.96 km^{2})
  - Water: 0.050 sq mi (0.13 km^{2})
- Elevation: 620 ft (190 m)

Population (2020)
  - City: 19,949
  - Rank: NY: 35th (2010)
  - Density: 3,046.8/sq mi (1,176.36/km^{2})
  - Metro: 1,254,066
- Time zone: UTC−5 (EST)
  - Summer (DST): UTC−4 (EDT)
- ZIP Codes: 14218 (Lackawanna); 14219 (Blasdell)
- Area code: 716
- FIPS code: 36-029-40189
- GNIS feature ID: 0954863
- Website: www.lackawannany.gov

Lackawanna is a city in Erie County, New York, United States, just south of the city of Buffalo in western New York State. The population was 19,949 at the 2020 census. It is one of the fastest-growing cities in New York, growing in population by 10% from 2010 to 2020. It is part of the Buffalo–Niagara Falls metropolitan area. The city of Lackawanna is in the western part of Erie County.

The town's name derives from the Lackawanna Steel Company, which owned the steel plant around which the city developed. During the early 20th century, the Lackawanna steel plant was the largest in the world. The word "Lackawanna" refers to the steel company's original location in the Lackawanna River Valley, in eastern Pennsylvania. That place name, in turn, might come from Lenape lèkaohane, meaning "sandy stream", or lechauhanne, [lɛxaohánɛk], meaning "forks of the river".

== History ==
Originally part of the Buffalo Creek Reservation, the area was not open to settlement until 1842 when the Seneca Indians sold it. In 1851 the town of Seneca was formed; the name was changed to West Seneca in 1852. The area now known as Lackawanna was then called West Seneca or Limestone Hill.

Lackawanna was a center of steel manufacture throughout most of the 20th century. In 1899, the Lackawanna Steel Company, based in Scranton, Pennsylvania, since its founding, purchased all the land along the West Seneca shore of Lake Erie. Construction was started in 1900 and the Lackawanna Steel Company relocated to the area in 1902. The plant began operations in 1903. In 1909, the area's residents voted to split from West Seneca, forming the city of Lackawanna.

With most of the city's workers employed by Lackawanna Steel, city affairs often revolved around events at the mill. Several attempts to organize a labor union at the mill resulted in violence. In 1910, a strike was broken by mounted police, who killed one worker. In 1919, steel workers formed a union again and joined the nationwide Steel strike of 1919. The workers were joined by sympathy strikes in adjacent companies, and two picketing workers were killed by company guards. Although the strike lasted into the summer of 1920, well after the national strike had ended, the union failed to win recognition from the company. As a result of the strike, Lackawanna elected a Socialist mayor, John H. Gibbons. After another violent strike in 1941, the CIO finally succeeded in negotiating a contract for the Lackawanna steel workers.

In 1922, the Bethlehem Steel Company acquired the Lackawanna Steel Company. With the 20th-century growth of the Bethlehem Steel plant, at one time the largest in the world, came the continued growth of the city and its institutions. At its peak, the plant employed 20,000 people. It attracted immigrants from many lands to settle and make their homes. Due to industrial restructuring in the latter half of the 20th century, as well as property tax assessment increases levied on the plant by the city, the steel plant declined in business and eventually closed in 1983, following massive job layoffs.

In the 21st century, efforts have been made to develop the former steel plant brownfields to other uses. The site has a diversity of tenants, some occupying buildings remaining from the former steel plant and a few in newer buildings. Opponents say that the brownfield is not safe and claim that contaminants in the field have caused cancer and other medical issues. United States Environmental Protection Agency reports are still ongoing and contested.

As part of redevelopment, wind turbines were built on the former Bethlehem Steel property in 2007. These initial eight 2.5 megawatt turbines will provide power for up to 9,000 households and are considered a sustainable energy source.

The Buffalo Harbor South Entrance Light was listed on the National Register of Historic Places in 2007.

On November 9, 2016, a major fire broke out at the former galvanizing plant of the Bethlehem Steel complex.

=== Railroads ===
The Delaware, Lackawanna and Western Railroad, originally the Lackawanna and Western Railroad, operated from 1851 to 1960. In 1960 it was consolidated with the Erie Railroad to become the Erie Lackawanna Railway. This operated until 1976, when it was absorbed by Conrail.

=== Notable court case ===
The city of Lackawanna was the defendant in the 1971 district court decision Kennedy-Park Homes Association v. City of Lackawanna. This decision forbade the municipal government (Lackawanna) from interfering with the construction of a low-income housing development in a predominantly white section of the city. The court ruled such action would amount to racial discrimination.

=== The Lackawanna Six ===
The Lackawanna Six (also known as the Buffalo Six) are a group of Yemeni Americans convicted of providing "material support" to Al-Qaeda. The group was accused of traveling to Afghanistan and Pakistan in the spring of 2001 to attend terrorist training camps. The men had claimed that their travel was to Pakistan only, and for the purpose of religious instruction.

The group was arrested in Lackawanna on September 13, 2002, by the FBI. A member of the Lackawanna Cell, Jaber A. Elbaneh, never returned to the U.S. after his trip to Afghanistan. In September 2003 the FBI announced a $5 million reward for information leading to his arrest. Captured by Yemen police, he was convicted and sentenced to a prison in Yemen for involvement in the 2002 bombing of the French oil tanker Limburg off the coast of Yemen. The remaining members of the group pleaded guilty in December 2003 and were given various sentences in federal prison.

Jaber Elbaneh escaped from a Yemeni prison in 2006 after joining a successful group prison break. He was identified as one of 23 people, 12 of them Al-Qaeda members, who escaped on February 3, 2006. On February 23, 2006, the FBI confirmed the escape, as they issued a national press release naming Elbaneh to the FBI Most Wanted Terrorists list. On May 20, 2007, Elbaneh turned himself in to Yemen authorities on the condition that his prison sentence would not be extended. The incident of the Lackawanna Six has tarnished the city's reputation, but it is recovering.

In July 2009, it was reported that prior to authorities sending in 130 federal and local members of the Western New York Joint Terrorism Task Force, there were suggestions that federal troops be used to capture the suspects. At the time, Vice President Dick Cheney and Defense Secretary Donald Rumsfeld believed that the Yemeni men should be declared enemy combatants and could have been tried by a military tribunal. President Bush rejected this proposal, and the arrests proceeded without incident.

== Geography ==
The city has an area of 6.6 square miles (17.1 km^{2}), of which 0.04 square miles (0.1 km^{2}), or 0.75%, is water. Lackawanna sits on Lake Erie, although the Bethlehem Steel facility's remnants occupy the waterfront. Smokes Creek (named after Seneca Indian Chief Sayenqueraghta who was nicknamed "Old Smoke") runs through the city before it discharges into Lake Erie.

Abbott Road is a major road that runs north–south through the city. Ridge Road is a main east–west road in the city.

=== Adjacent cities and towns ===
- City of Buffalo—north
- Town of West Seneca—east
- Town of Orchard Park—southeast
- Town of Hamburg—south
- Village of Blasdell—south
- Lake Erie—west

=== Major highways ===
- Interstate 90 (New York State Thruway), runs through the extreme southeast corner of the city.
- U.S. Route 62 (South Park Ave.), North–south roadway that runs through the city from Buffalo into Blasdell and Hamburg.
- New York State Route 5 (Fuhrmann Blvd., Hamburg Tprk.), north–south (signed east–west) roadway through the city that runs from Hamburg to Buffalo. Busy north–south (signed east–west) route for traffic to and from Buffalo.

== Demographics ==
Historical population
Census	Pop.	Note	%±
1910	14,549		—
1920	17,918		23.2%
1930	23,948		33.7%
1940	24,058		0.5%
1950	27,658		15.0%
1960	29,564		6.9%
1970	28,657		−3.1%
1980	22,701		−20.8%
1990	20,585		−9.3%
2000	19,064		−7.4%
2010	18,141		−4.8%
2020	19,949		10.0%
U.S. Decennial Census

=== 2020 census ===
As of the 2020 census, Lackawanna had a population of 19,949. The median age was 37.5 years. 23.7% of residents were under the age of 18 and 16.4% of residents were 65 years of age or older. For every 100 females there were 97.9 males, and for every 100 females age 18 and over there were 95.6 males age 18 and over.

100.0% of residents lived in urban areas, while 0.0% lived in rural areas.

There were 8,432 households in Lackawanna, of which 26.0% had children under the age of 18 living in them. Of all households, 29.9% were married-couple households, 26.5% were households with a male householder and no spouse or partner present, and 35.6% were households with a female householder and no spouse or partner present. About 39.9% of all households were made up of individuals and 14.9% had someone living alone who was 65 years of age or older.

There were 9,256 housing units, of which 8.9% were vacant. The homeowner vacancy rate was 1.2% and the rental vacancy rate was 5.7%.

Racial composition as of the 2020 census
Race	Number	Percent
White	15,118	75.8%
Black or African American	2,201	11.0%
American Indian and Alaska Native	100	0.5%
Asian	319	1.6%
Native Hawaiian and Other Pacific Islander	3	0.0%
Some other race	628	3.1%
Two or more races	1,580	7.9%
Hispanic or Latino (of any race)	1,830	9.2%

=== 2000 census ===
As of the 2000 census, there were 19,064 people, 8,192 households, and 4,775 families residing in the city. The population density was 3,114.0 inhabitants per square mile (1,202.3/km^{2}). There were 8,951 housing units at an average density of 1,462.1 per square mile (564.5/km^{2}). The racial makeup of the city was 83.99% White, 9.50% African American, 0.40% Native American, 0.31% Asian (excluding Yemeni Arabs), 0.01% Pacific Islander, 2.30% from other races, and 3.49% from two or more races. Hispanic or Latino people of any race were 5.08% of the population. Lackawanna also has a sizeable Yemeni population.

There were 8,192 households, out of which 26.0% had children under the age of 18 living with them, 37.2% were married couples living together, 16.5% had a female householder with no husband present, and 41.7% were non-families. Of all households 37.0% were made up of individuals, and 15.9% had someone living alone who was 65 years of age or older. The average household size was 2.30 and the average family size was 3.06.

In the city, the population was spread out, with 24.5% under the age of 18, 8.5% from 18 to 24, 28.0% from 25 to 44, 20.4% from 45 to 64, and 18.5% who were 65 years of age or older. The median age was 38 years. For every 100 females, there were 92.3 males. For every 100 females age 18 and over, there were 87.5 males.

The median income for a household in the city was $29,354, and the median income for a family was $39,237. Males had a median income of $32,063 versus $22,794 for females. The per capita income for the city was $16,727. About 13.1% of families and 16.7% of the population were below the poverty line, including 27.4% of those under age 18 and 9.0% of those age 65 or over.

== Government ==
The city of Lackawanna has a mayor-council form of government. A councilmember is elected from each of the four wards of the city, considered single-member districts. The mayor and council president are elected at-large. Fire and police services are also provided by city-run departments.

Because of its resemblance to a popular mid-20th century west coast building type, Lackawanna's burnt-orange city hall is distinctive for possibly being the only dingbat city hall in the United States.

== Religious institutions ==
The city of Lackawanna is home to fourteen Protestant churches, the Masjid Alhuda Guidance Mosque (the largest mosque in the Buffalo area), ten Roman Catholic churches, including Our Lady of Victory Basilica (OLV); and Saint Stephen Serbian Orthodox Church.

=== Our Lady of Victory Basilica ===
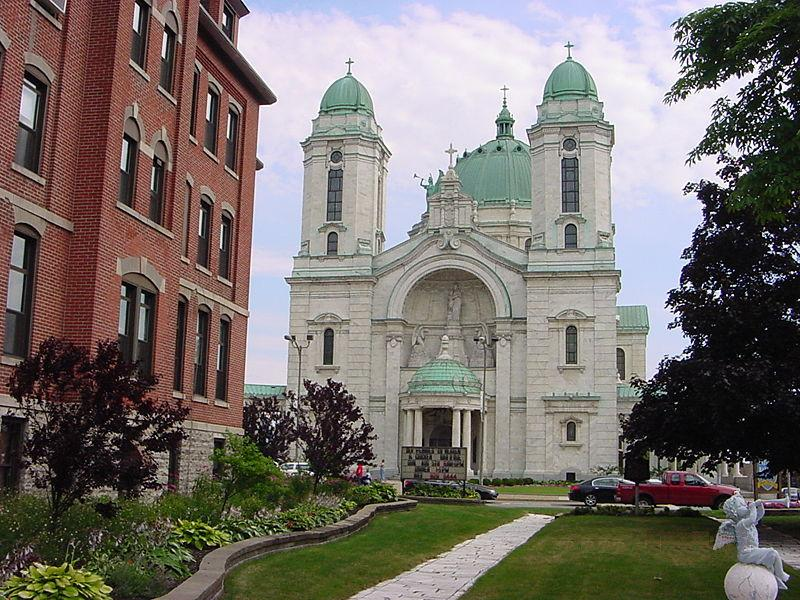
Our Lady of Victory Basilica

Lackawanna's Our Lady of Victory Basilica, consecrated in 1926, is a National Shrine. Holy Cross Cemetery lies next to it, a parish cemetery since 1849, with burials predating it to 1830.

Father Nelson Baker was responsible for the building of a working boys' home (protectory) in 1898. He also supervised construction of an infants' home in 1907, a maternity home in 1915, Our Lady of Victory Hospital in 1919, and the Basilica of Our Lady of Victory in 1926. Father Baker named the basilica after the shrine of Notre Dame des Victoires in Paris, which he visited as a seminarian in 1874. He was in charge of the basilica and the institutions of charity until his death at 94, on July 29, 1936.

Father Baker's social programs have evolved into Baker Victory Services, which care for more than 2,500 children each day. Baker Victory Services Adoption Program has evolved into a renowned resource for a wide range of adoptive services. Our Lady of Victory Hospital, closed in 1999, is being converted into senior housing. The Homes of Charity provide the funds to continue Baker's social programs through donations.

== Education ==
=== Public ===
Children in Lackawanna attend school in the Lackawanna City School District. Grades Pre-K to 1 attend Truman Elementary School. Martin Road Elementary School has grades K–5. In a shared building, grades 6 through 8 are in the Lackawanna Middle School section and grades 9 through 12 are in Lackawanna High School section.

The Global Concepts Charter School, a charter school in the New York State system, offers education from Kindergarten through Grade 12. The school consists of two separate buildings. The K-8 building is at 1001 Ridge Road. The high school, grades 9–12, are at 30 Johnson Street.

=== Private ===
Our Lady of Victory Elementary School, a private school affiliated with the Roman Catholic Church, includes kindergarten through Grade 8.

== Notable people ==
- R. J. Adams (aka Bob Shannon), film and TV actor, radio personality (WKBW)
- Dr. Debbie Almontaser, founded and is a former principal of the Khalil Gibran International Academy. She is also a community activist of Yemeni descent.
- Father Nelson Baker, Roman Catholic priest responsible for building the Basilica of Our Lady of Victory; "Padre of the Poor"; established social programs (for orphans, people with disabilities, and unwed mothers), which still serve over 2,500 people a day
- John Batorski, former professional football player
- Raymond Castilloux, racing cyclist, winner of first place classification at New York Central Park representing US cycling team at the Tokyo 1964 Olympics
- Raymond F. Gallagher, former New York State Senator
- Joe Hesketh, former Major League Baseball pitcher who played from 1984 through 1994 for the Montreal Expos, Atlanta Braves and Boston Red Sox
- Ron Jaworski, ESPN broadcaster and former quarterback for the Philadelphia Eagles, Los Angeles Rams, Miami Dolphins, and Kansas City Chiefs
- Mike Mamula, defensive lineman for Boston College Eagles who was selected #7 in the first round by the Philadelphia Eagles in the 1995 NFL draft
- Pat McMahon, former college baseball coach
- Abdulsalam Noman, former city councilman and first Yemeni-American elected in New York State
- John R. Pillion, former US congressman
- Francis J. Pordum, former New York State Assemblyman
- Frederick F. Pordum, former Erie County Legislator
- Connie Porter, author best known for her books for children and young adults Her novel All-Bright Court is set in Lackawanna.
- Ruben Santiago-Hudson, actor and playwright; set his musical Lackawanna Blues in the Lackawanna community of 1956 Major acting role was in ABC series "Castle." In 1996 he received Tony Award for performance in "Seven Guitars". The Fine Arts Center at Global Concepts Charter High School is named in his honor.
- Sayenqueraghta, war chief of the eastern Seneca tribe in the mid-18th century, lived near Smoke Creek (or Smokes Creek) in what is now Lackawanna, NY. He died in Smoke Creek (named after him) in 1786.
- Dick Shawn (born Richard Schulefand), actor, comedian, and singer; appeared in The Producers and It's a Mad, Mad, Mad, Mad World; his parents owned a store in Lackawanna
- Dr. Lonnie Smith, award-winning jazz organist; has worked closely with George Benson; has appeared with Dizzy Gillespie, Gladys Knight, and Dionne Warwick
- Margaret M. Sullivan, New York Times public editor; serves on the Pulitzer Prize Board; previously editor of The Buffalo News; media columnist at the Washington Post
- John B. Weber, the youngest colonel (age 20) in the Civil War after his appointment to the 89th United States Colored Infantry; elected to Congress and served from 1885 to 1889; first commissioner of the immigration station at Ellis Island.

== Photos of Lackawanna ==
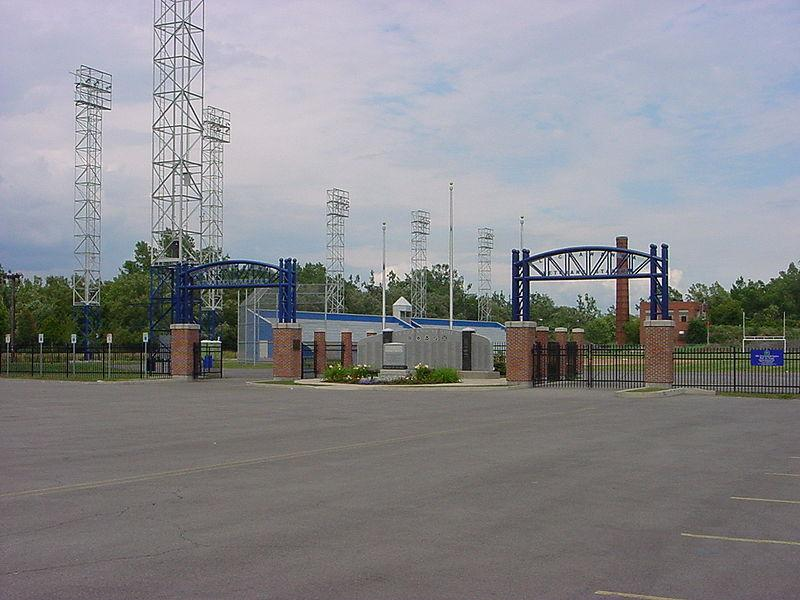
Lackawanna's Veterans Stadium (formerly Ron Jaworski Stadium)

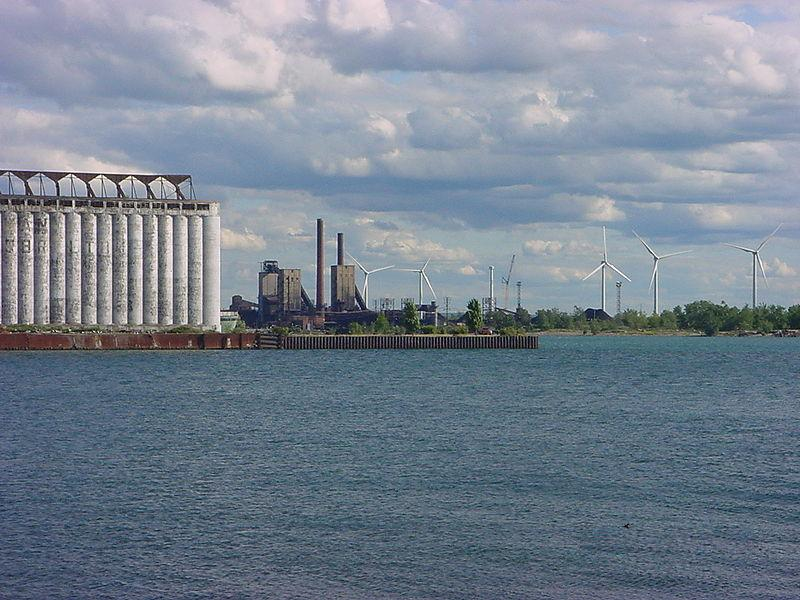
Wind turbines of the Steel Winds project at former Bethlehem Steel plant along Lake Erie

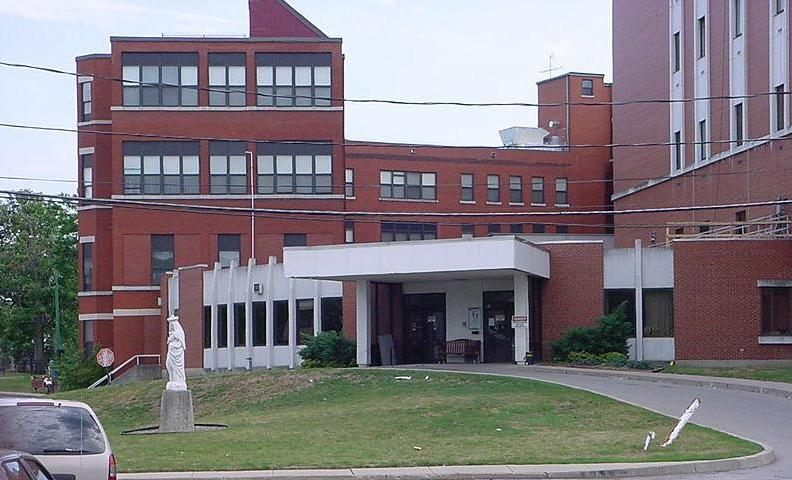
Entrance to the former Our Lady of Victory Hospital

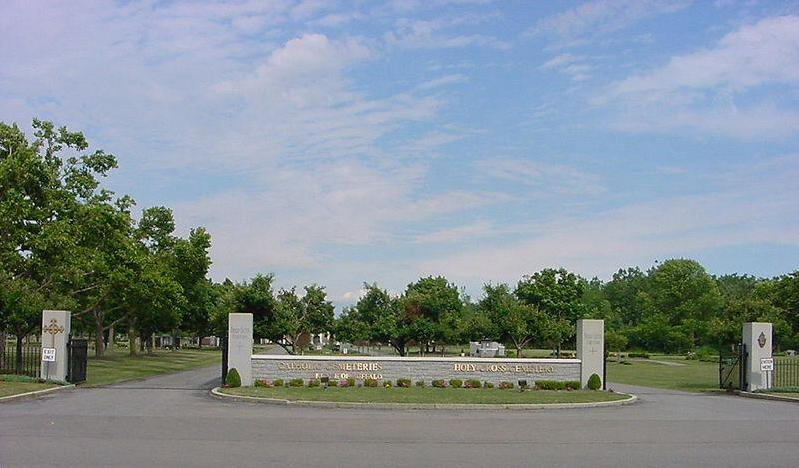
South Park Avenue entrance to Holy Cross Cemetery
