= Frederick F. Pordum =

American politician (1934–2023)

Frederick F. Pordum (1934 – August 24, 2023) was an American politician and educator from Lackawanna, New York. As a Democrat, he represented the 1st District in the Erie County Legislature from 1968 to 1971.

He graduated from The Citadel in 1959. He earned a master's degree from the University at Buffalo. He returned to Lackawanna to become a schoolteacher and football coach. Notably he coached former Philadelphia Eagle great, Ron Jaworski.

Political offices
Preceded by Seat Created	1st District Erie County Legislator; 1968-1971	Succeeded by John C. Ogarek
