= 2016 Bethlehem Steel fire =

Industrial fire in New York, United States

- View of fire from NYS Route 5
- Date: November 9, 2016
- Time: 7:30 a.m.
- Location: Lackawanna, New York, U.S.; 42.8092°N 78.8447°W
- Cause: Unknown
- Injuries: 1

On November 9, 2016, around 7:30 a.m., a major fire broke out at a 1-million-square-foot (93,000 m^{2}) galvanizing warehouse that was formerly part of the now-vacated Bethlehem Steel complex in Lackawanna, New York, just south of Buffalo. The fire was said to have been caused by a hot bulb which fell and struck cardboard inside of the building, igniting the structure, although this has not been confirmed. Subsequently, a thick ash cloud extended 30 mi (48 km) south of the accident site, viewable from Canada, Eden, New York, and weather radars. Hundreds of firefighters from area departments, including the Buffalo Fire Department, assisted in rescue operations, which resulted in one injury.

== Aftermath ==
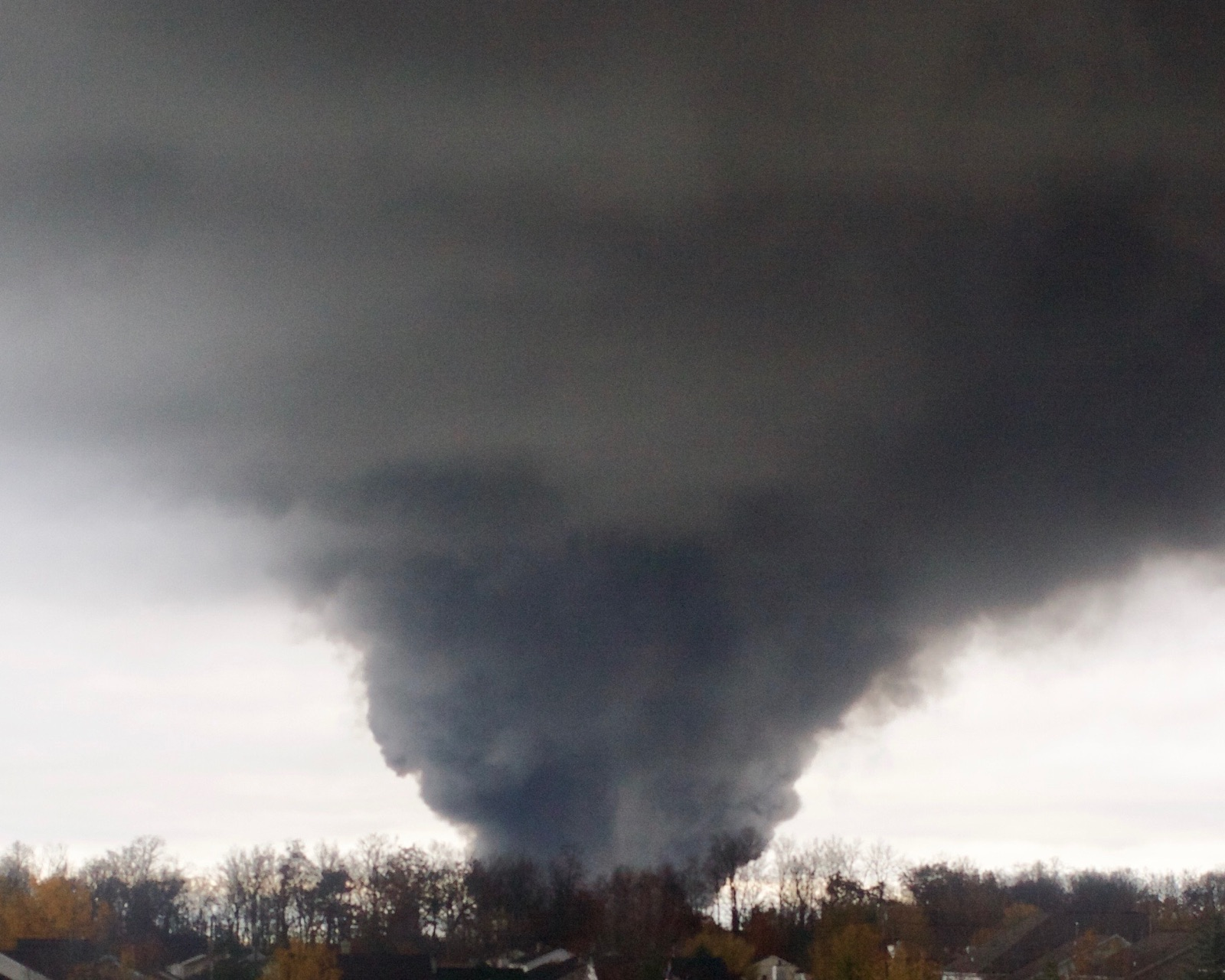
Smoke plume seen approximately 5 mi (8.0 km) down range from accident site

Throughout the day, chunks of ash were carried south by a plume to the town of Hamburg. The poor air quality affected school and businesses downwind from the scene of the fire, and led to the evacuation of 300 households in the immediate area. Frontier Central School District evacuated several of its schools to different districts and remained closed the next day. West Seneca and Lake Shore school districts held a shelter in place for students as they were further from the accident site. In addition, 3.5 million U.S. gallons (13,000 cubic meters) of water were used to fight the fire.

On November 10, Governor Andrew Cuomo toured the site and announced that state officials would further monitor air quality in the surrounding areas.

Emergency demolition commenced on November 10 and continued the next day.

On September 21, 2017, the Buffalo Fire Department closed the 10-month investigation as "undetermined."
