= Downie River =

River in California, United States

Coordinates: 39°33′35″N 120°49′43″W

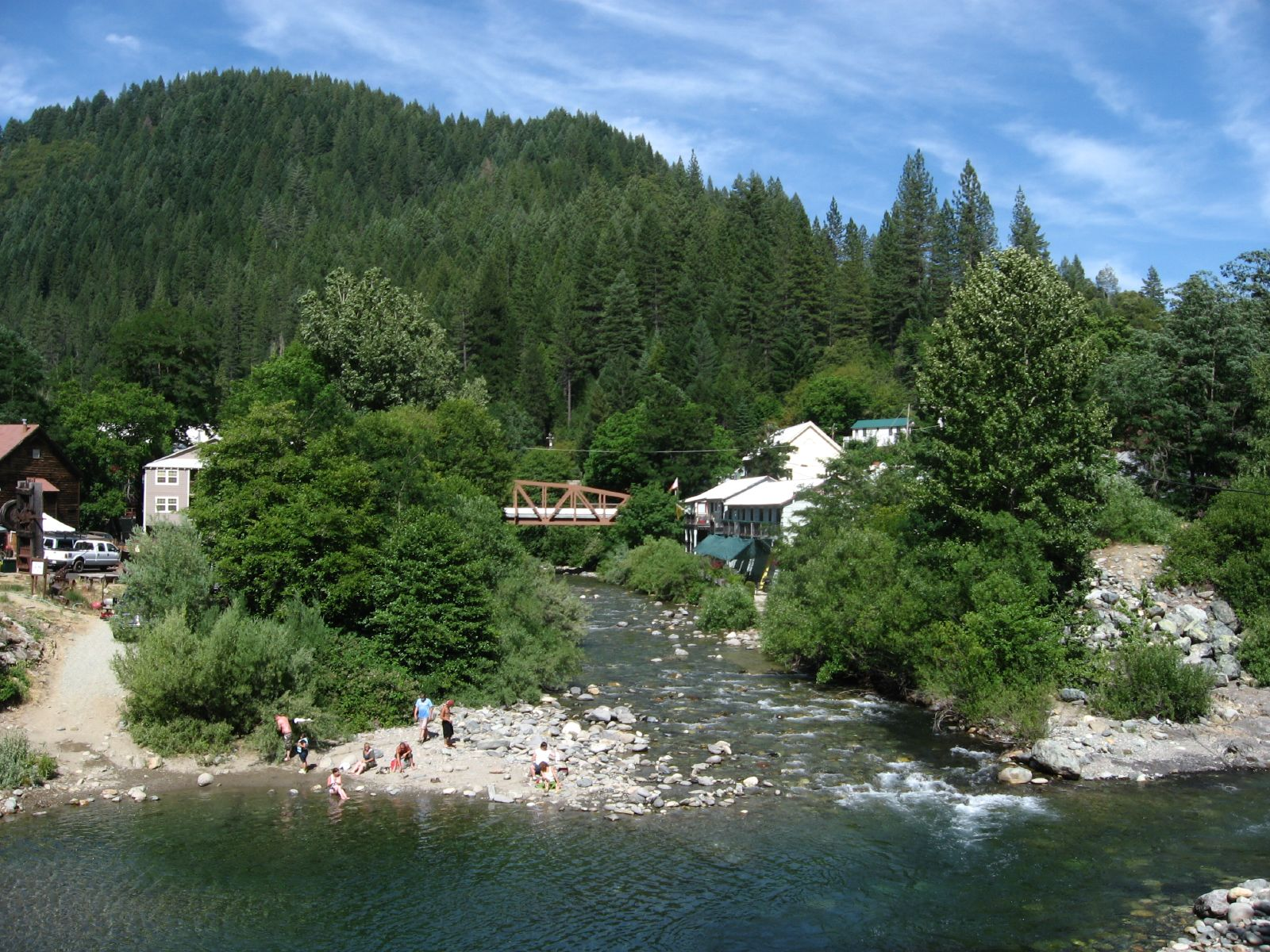
Downie River at confluence with North Yuba River

The Downie River is an approximately 5.5 mi (8.9 km) tributary of the North Yuba River in Sierra County, California, in the United States. The river originates from the confluence of the West Branch Downie River and Rattlesnake Creek in the Tahoe National Forest, and flows south to its confluence with the North Yuba at Downieville. The river drains a mountainous watershed of about 34 mi^{2} (88 km^{2}) in the northern Sierra Nevada. Tributaries include Lavezzola Creek and Pauley Creek, which both join the Downie from the left shortly above the mouth.

The river and town are named after Scottish prospector William Downie, who settled here in 1850.
