= Royal, Nebraska =

Village in Nebraska, US

- Village
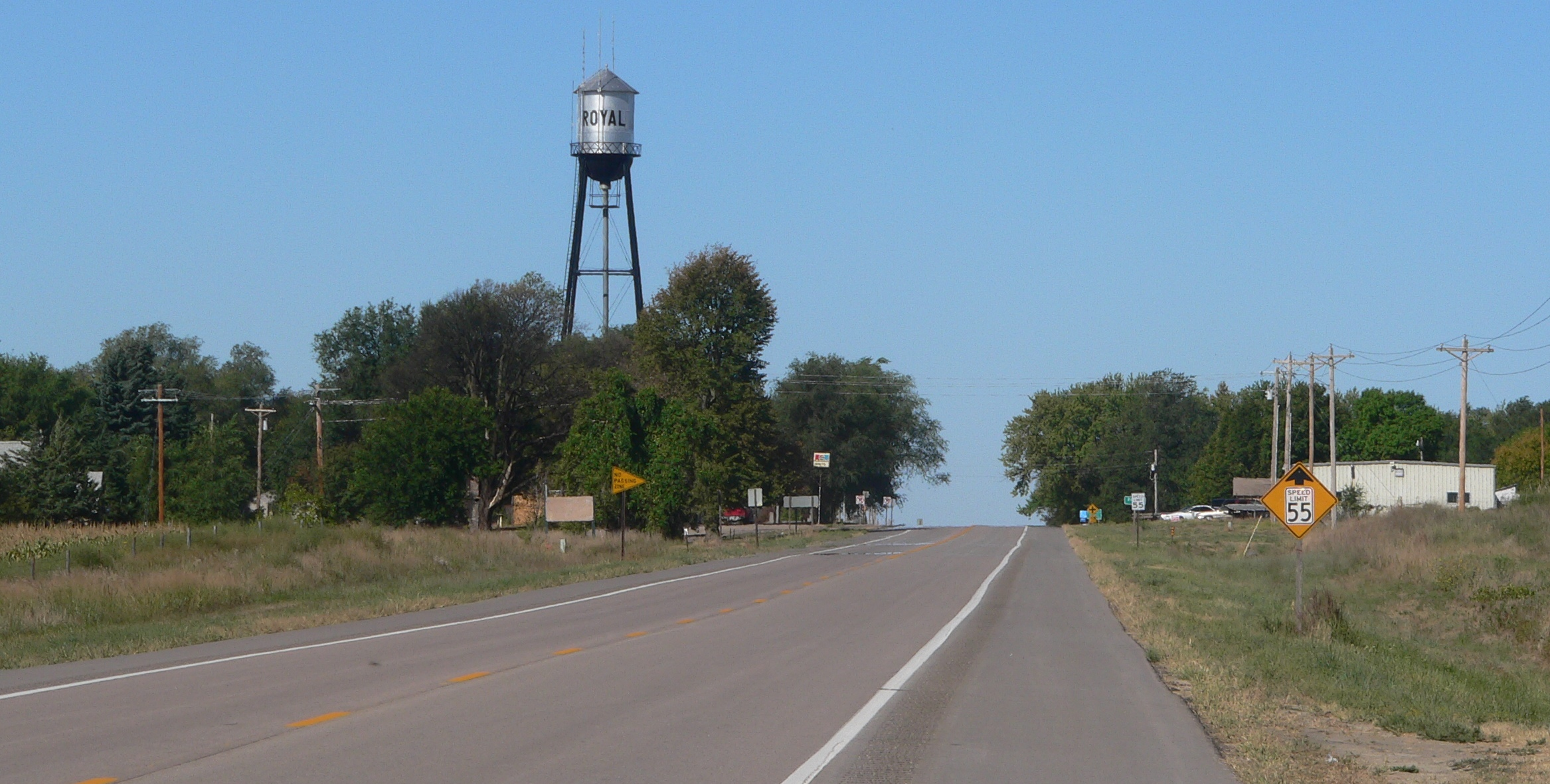
- Royal, seen from the east along U.S. Highway 20

- Location of Royal, Nebraska
- Coordinates: 42°19′59″N 98°07′30″W
- Country: United States
- State: Nebraska
- County: Antelope
- Established: 1890

Area
  - Total: 0.14 sq mi (0.37 km^{2})
  - Land: 0.14 sq mi (0.37 km^{2})
  - Water: 0 sq mi (0.00 km^{2})
- Elevation: 1,880 ft (570 m)

Population (2020)
  - Total: 58
  - Density: 409.8/sq mi (158.23/km^{2})
- Time zone: UTC-6 (Central (CST))
  - Summer (DST): UTC-5 (CDT)
- ZIP code: 68773
- Area code: 402
- FIPS code: 31-42495
- GNIS feature ID: 2399137

Royal is a village in Antelope County, Nebraska, United States. As of the 2020 census, Royal had a population of 58.

== History ==
The community was established in 1890 (or 1880), and was originally named "Savage". The community was renamed after Royal Thayer, who helped establish the post office.

An unusual point in the town's history is the defunct "Zoo Nebraska", which was near Royal. After some chimpanzees escaped, and were killed, the zoo gained some national attention and then ultimately collapsed. In 2019 a book about the zoo and the incident was released.

== Geography ==
According to the United States Census Bureau, the village has a total area of 0.14 square miles (0.36 km^{2}), all land.

== Demographics ==
Historical population
Census	Pop.	Note	%±
1920	202		—
1930	217		7.4%
1940	193		−11.1%
1950	157		−18.7%
1960	93		−40.8%
1970	86		−7.5%
1980	86		0.0%
1990	81		−5.8%
2000	75		−7.4%
2010	63		−16.0%
2020	58		−7.9%
U.S. Decennial Census

=== 2010 census ===
At the 2010 census there were 63 people, 29 households, and 14 families living in the village. The population density was 450.0 inhabitants per square mile (173.7/km^{2}). There were 38 housing units at an average density of 271.4 per square mile (104.8/km^{2}). The racial makeup of the village was 98.4% White and 1.6% from two or more races. Hispanic or Latino of any race were 1.6%.

Of the 29 households 24.1% had children under the age of 18 living with them, 37.9% were married couples living together, 3.4% had a female householder with no husband present, 6.9% had a male householder with no wife present, and 51.7% were non-families. 41.4% of households were one person and 17.2% were one person aged 65 or older. The average household size was 2.17 and the average family size was 2.79.

The median age in the village was 45.1 years. 19% of residents were under the age of 18; 7.9% were between the ages of 18 and 24; 22.2% were from 25 to 44; 36.5% were from 45 to 64; and 14.3% were 65 or older. The gender makeup of the village was 55.6% male and 44.4% female.

=== 2000 census ===
At the 2000 census there were 75 people, 34 households, and 21 families living in the village. The population density was 523.6 inhabitants per square mile (202.2/km^{2}). There were 40 housing units at an average density of 279.3 per square mile (107.8/km^{2}). The racial makeup of the village was 100.00% White. Of the 34 households 29.4% had children under the age of 18 living with them, 58.8% were married couples living together, and 38.2% were non-families. 38.2% of households were one person and 23.5% were one person aged 65 or older. The average household size was 2.21 and the average family size was 2.90.

The age distribution was 22.7% under the age of 18, 8.0% from 18 to 24, 26.7% from 25 to 44, 20.0% from 45 to 64, and 22.7% 65 or older. The median age was 42 years. For every 100 females, there were 87.5 males. For every 100 females age 18 and over, there were 123.1 males.

The median household income was $27,292, and the median family income was $50,000. Males had a median income of $34,063 versus $18,125 for females. The per capita income for the village was $13,414. There were 7.7% of families and 6.6% of the population living below the poverty line, including no under eighteens and 19.0% of those over 64.

== Education ==
Royal was formerly in Nebraska Unified School District 1. As per the website it is now in Summerland Public Schools.

== Parks and recreation ==
The Ashfall Fossil Beds State Historical Park is located six miles from Royal. The park features well preserved skeletons of prehistoric animals, and is a joint project of the Nebraska Game and Parks Commission and the University of Nebraska State Museum.
