= List of bridges on the National Register of Historic Places in Nebraska =

This is a list of bridges and tunnels on the National Register of Historic Places in the U.S. state of Nebraska.

Many of the bridges were the works of the Nebraska Department of Roads or its predecessors, including the Nebraska Bureau of Roads & Bridges. Many were registered after a study in the 1990s seeking to inventory historic bridges in Nebraska and pursuant to a Multiple Property Submission titled "Highway Bridges in Nebraska."

Name	Image	Built	Listed	Location	County	Type
Adamson Bridge		1916	1992-06-29	Valentine; 42°48′26″N 100°40′20″W	Cherry	Timber stringer trestle
Ashland Bridge (Ashland, Nebraska)		1936	1992-06-29	Ashland; 41.034444°N 96.366944°W	Saunders	Warren pony truss, one of two surviving in Nebraska
Beal Slough Bridge		1937	1992-06-29	Lincoln; 40°46′13″N 96°42′46″W	Lancaster	Concrete rigid frame bridge
Bell Bridge		1903	1992-06-29	Valentine; 42°53′42″N 100°19′20″W	Cherry	Pratt through truss
Berry State Aid Bridge	Berry State Aid Bridge	1920, 1921	1992-06-29	Valentine; 42°54′7″N 100°21′44″W	Cherry	Pratt through truss
Big Blue River Bridge (Surprise, Nebraska)		1897, 1898	1992-06-29	Surprise; 41°6′3″N 97°17′28″W	Butler	Pin-connected Pratt truss
Big Blue River Bridge (Grafton, Nebraska)		1918	1992-06-29	Grafton; 40°41′47″N 97°43′44″W	Fillmore	Concrete spandrel arch
Big Indian Creek Bridge		1903	1992-06-29	Wymore; 40°5′13″N 96°43′22″W	Gage	Warren pony truss
Big Papillion Creek Bridge		ca. 1940	1992-06-29	La Vista; 41°10′27″N 96°6′1″W	Sarpy	Tied arch pony truss
Bloody Run Bridge		1898	1992-06-29	Virginia; 40°12′39″N 96°33′29″W	Gage	Warren pony truss
Borman Bridge	Borman Bridge	1916	1992-06-29	Valentine; 42°51′7″N 100°31′15″W	Cherry	Pratt through truss
Brewer Bridge	Brewer Bridge	1899, 1921	1992-06-29	Valentine; 42°52′34″N 100°15′58″W	Cherry	Pratt through truss
Bridge		1912	1992-06-29	Nebraska City; 40°39′39″N 95°52′41″W	Otoe	Concrete spandrel arch
Bridge		1876	1992-06-29	Lorton; 40°34′1″N 96°5′26″W	Otoe	Bowstring pony arch-truss
Mynard Road Bridge		ca. 1900	1992-06-29	Louisville; 40°58′22″N 96°4′55″W	Cass	Warren truss leg bedstead
Bridge		1898	1992-06-29	Wymore; 40°9′6″N 96°47′3″W	Gage	Warren pony truss
Bridge		1908	1992-06-29	Stratton; 40°9′7″N 101°11′29″W	Hitchcock	Reinforced concrete slab
Brownson Viaduct		1942	1992-06-29	Brownson; 41°11′22″N 103°7′17″W	Cheyenne	Timber stringer trestle
Brownville Bridge		1939	1993-06-17	Brownville; 40°23′57″N 95°39′6″W	Nemaha	
Bryan Bridge	Bryan Bridge	1932	1988-06-23	Valentine; 42°49′56″N 100°31′41″W	Cherry	Pin-connected arch bridge
Burwell Bridge		1940, 1941	1992-06-29	Burwell; 41°46′4″N 99°7′31″W	Garfield	Steel stringer bridge
Cambridge State Aid Bridge		1914	1992-06-29	Cambridge; 40°16′25″N 100°9′56″W	Furnas	Spandrel arch bridge
Camp Clarke Bridge Site	Camp Clarke Bridge Site	1875, 1880	1974-11-08	Bridgeport	Morrill	
Carns State Aid Bridge		1912, 1913	1992-06-29	Bassett; 42°44′1″N 99°28′52″W	Rock	Parker & Pratt through truss
Cincinnati Bridge		1879, 1880	1992-06-29	Du Bois; 40°0′47″N 96°2′40″W	Pawnee	Bowstring through arch truss
Clear Creek Bridge		1891, 1928	1992-06-29	Bellwood; 41°23′3″N 97°20′6″W	Butler	Warren through truss
Colclesser Bridge		1888, 1933, 1934	1992-06-29	Rushville; 42°33′3″N 102°29′9″W	Sheridan	Baltimore through truss
Columbus Loup River Bridge		1932, 1933	1992-06-29	Columbus; 41°25′1″N 97°22′4″W	Platte	Parker through truss
Deering Bridge		1916	1992-06-29	Sutton; 40°38′26″N 97°49′27″W	Clay; Fillmore	Concrete spandrel arch
DeWitt Flour Mills and King Iron Bridge		ca. 1888, 1911, 1920	1978-12-27	DeWitt	Gage	Pratt Through Truss
Elkhorn River Bridge		1883, 1929	1992-06-29	Clearwater; 42°9′36″N 98°7′33″W	Antelope	Bowstring through arch-truss
Franklin Bridge		1932, 1935	1992-06-29	Franklin; 40°4′33″N 98°57′8″W	Franklin	Warren pony truss
Gross State Aid Bridge		1918	1992-06-29	Verdigre; 42°39′16″N 98°2′34″W	Knox	Parker through truss
Henry State Aid Bridges		1919	1992-06-29	Henry; 41°59′50″N 104°2′50″W	Scotts Bluff	Concrete spandrel arch
Hoyt Street Bridge		ca. 1870, 1890	1992-06-29	Beatrice; 40°16′39″N 96°46′40″W	Gage	Bowstring through arch-truss
Interstate Canal Bridge		ca. 1915	1992-06-29	Scottsbluff; 41°59′50″N 103°38′18″W	Scotts Bluff	Pratt pony truss
Keim Stone Arch Bridge		1916	1992-06-29	Tecumseh; 40°23′32″N 96°7′22″W	Johnson	Limestone arch
Kilgore Bridge		1915	1992-06-29	Kearney; 40°41′2″N 98°57′3″W	Buffalo	Pratt pony truss
Lewellen State Aid Bridge		1926, 1927	1992-06-29	Lewellen; 41°19′3″N 102°8′34″W	Garden	Pratt pony truss
Lewis Bridge		1922	1992-06-29	Springview; 42°59′53″N 99°38′8″W	Keya Paha	Pratt pony truss
Lisco State Aid Bridge		1927, 1928	1992-06-29	Lisco; 41°29′22″N 102°37′30″W	Garden	Pratt pony truss
Little Nemaha River Bridge (Dunbar, Nebraska)		1874	1992-06-29	Dunbar; 40°40′57″N 96°2′42″W	Otoe	Bowstring pony arch-truss
Loosveldt Bridge		1888, 1933, 1934	1992-06-29	Rushville; 42°34′53″N 102°23′2″W	Sheridan	Baltimore through truss
Main Street Bridge		1915, 1920	1992-06-29	Elkhorn; 41°16′54″N 96°14′14″W	Douglas	Steel stringer bridge
Meridian Bridge	Meridian Bridge	1924	1993-06-17	South Yankton; 42°51′35″N 97°23′37″W	Cedar	Prat vertical-lift truss
Mission Creek Bridge		1898	1992-06-29	Barneston; 40°0′15″N 96°27′48″W	Gage	Warren pony truss
Neligh Mill Bridge		1910	1992-06-29	Neligh; 42°7′32″N 98°1′51″W	Antelope	Pratt through truss
Nine Bridges Bridge		1913	1992-06-29	Doniphan; 40°49′40″N 98°22′47″W	Hall	Pratt half-hip pony truss
Niobrara River Bridge		1929	1992-11-12	Niobrara; 42°45′53″N 98°2′39″W	Knox	Warren through truss
North Loup Bridge		1912	1992-06-29	North Loup; 41°30′38″N 98°45′4″W	Valley	Pratt through truss
North Omaha Creek Bridge		ca. 1905	1992-06-29	Winnebago; 42°11′38″N 96°31′50″W	Thurston	Pin-connected Pratt truss
Olive Branch Bridge		1897	1992-06-29	Sprague; 40°36′37″N 96°46′27″W	Lancaster	Warren truss leg bedstead
Plattsmouth Bridge		1929	1993-04-15	Plattsmouth; 41°0′2″N 95°51′58″W	Cass	Cantlevered through truss
Ponca Creek Bridge		1904	1992-06-29	Lynch; 42°49′27″N 98°24′24″W	Boyd	Pratt half-hip pony truss
Prairie Dog Creek Bridge		1913	1992-06-29	Orleans; 40°0′16″N 99°28′48″W	Harlan	Camelback pony truss
Rattlesnake Creek Bridge		1903	1992-06-29	Bancroft; 42°2′39″N 96°36′48″W	Cuming	Pratt half-hip pony truss
Red Cloud Bridge		1935	1992-06-29	Red Cloud; 40°3′46″N 98°31′7″W	Webster	Warren pony/through truss
Republican River Bridge		1911	1992-06-29	Riverton; 40°4′10″N 98°44′38″W	Franklin	Pratt through truss
Roscoe State Aid Bridge		1934, 1935	1992-06-29	Roscoe; 41°7′33″N 101°34′35″W	Keith	Steel cantilevered stringer
Rulo Bridge		1938, 1939	1993-01-04	Rulo; 40°3′14″N 95°25′14″W	Richardson	Pennsylvania through truss
Saddle Creek Underpass	Saddle Creek Underpass	1934	1992-06-29	Omaha; 41°15′35″N 95°58′49″W	Douglas	Concrete rigid frame bridge
Sappa Creek Bridge		1916	1992-06-29	Stamford; 40°7′53″N 99°33′17″W	Harlan	Pratt pony truss
Sargent Bridge		1908	1992-06-29	Sargent; 41°37′38″N 99°22′18″W	Custer	Pratt through truss
South Omaha Bridge		1933–1935	1992-06-29	Omaha; 41°12′47″N 95°55′57″W	Douglas	Warren through truss
Stewart Bridge		1915	1992-06-29	Oak; 40°21′2″N 97°52′38″W	Nuckolls	Concrete spandrel arch
Sutherland State Aid Bridge		1914, 1915	1992-06-29	Sutherland; 41°12′41″N 100°59′51″W	Lincoln	Concrete spandrel arch
Sweetwater Mill Bridge		1909	1992-06-29	Sweetwater; 41°2′27″N 99°0′27″W	Buffalo	Pratt pony truss
Tekamah City Bridge		1934	1992-06-29	Tekamah; 41°46′36″N 96°13′15″W	Burt	Concrete rigid frame bridge
Turkey Creek Bridge		1899	1992-06-29	Ragan; 40°17′33″N 99°19′57″W	Harlan	Pin-connected Pratt truss
Twin Bridge (Brownlee, Nebraska)		1900	1992-06-29	Brownlee; 42°20′0″N 100°45′43″W	Cherry	Steel stringer bridge
Verdigris Creek Bridge		ca. 1918	1992-06-29	Royal; 42°21′31″N 98°6′23″W	Antelope	Kingpost pony truss
Willow Creek Bridge		1913	1992-06-29	Foster; 42°10′38″N 97°40′1″W	Pierce	Lattice pony truss
Wolf Creek Bridge		1889	1992-06-29	Dunbar; 40°47′2″N 95°54′57″W	Otoe	Pratt through truss
Wyoming Bridge		1878	1992-06-29	Dunbar; 40°44′43″N 95°53′32″W	Otoe	Bowstring pony arch-truss
York Subway		1938, 1939	1992-06-29	York; 40°52′27″N 97°35′34″W	York	Concrete rigid frame bridge
Bridge		1911	1992-06-29 removed 2019-03-25	Royal; 42°24′50″N 98°4′2″W	Antelope	Kingpost pony truss
Little Nemaha River Bridge (Syracuse, Nebraska)		1901	1992-06-29 removed 2012-12-19	Syracuse; 40°40′0″N 96°14′9″W	Otoe	Pratt pony truss

== See also ==
- Nebraska Department of Roads
- Western Bridge and Construction Company - Constructed several of the NRHP bridges.
