= Nebraska Department of Transportation =

U.S. state government agency

Nebraska Department of Transportation (NDOT)
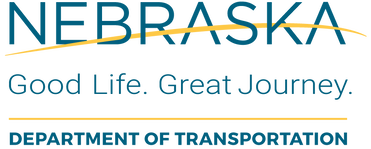

Agency overview
- Formed: July 1, 2017; 9 years ago
- Preceding agencies: Nebraska Department of Roads; Nebraska Department of Aeronautics
- Jurisdiction: State of Nebraska
- Headquarters: 1500 Highway 2, Lincoln, Nebraska, U.S.
- Agency executive: Vicki Kramer, (director)
- Website: dot.nebraska.gov

The Nebraska Department of Transportation (Nebraska DOT or NDOT) is the state government agency charged with building and maintaining the state highways in the U.S. state of Nebraska, as well as the state's airports. The main headquarters of the agency is located in Lincoln, the capital city. There are currently eight NDOT district offices located across the state.

The agency was formed on July 1, 2017, following the merger of the Nebraska Department of Roads and the Nebraska Department of Aeronautics, the last of all 50 US states to do something of the like.

== Highways and roads ==
The Department of Transportation manages the Nebraska State Highway System, including the U.S. Highways and Interstate Highways within the state.

== Registered historic sites ==
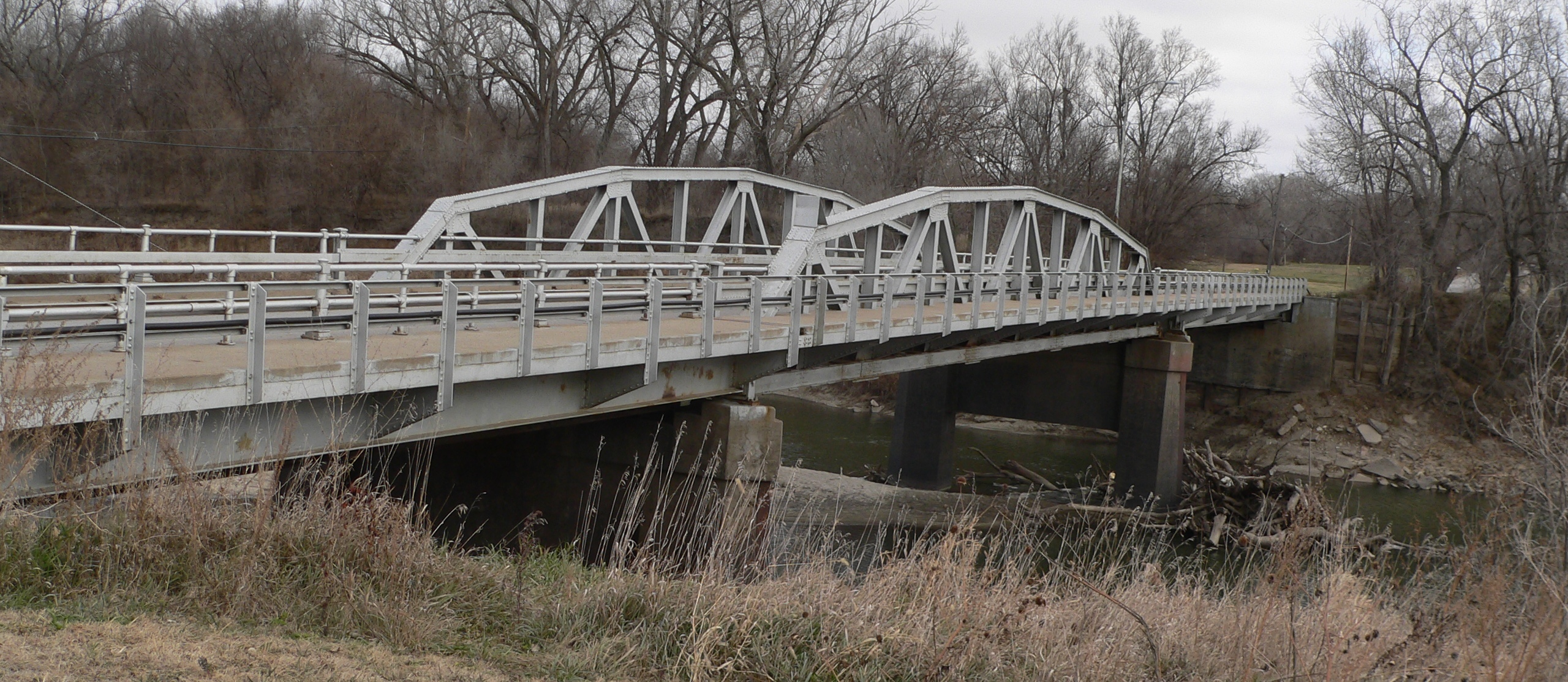
Ashland Bridge over Salt Creek

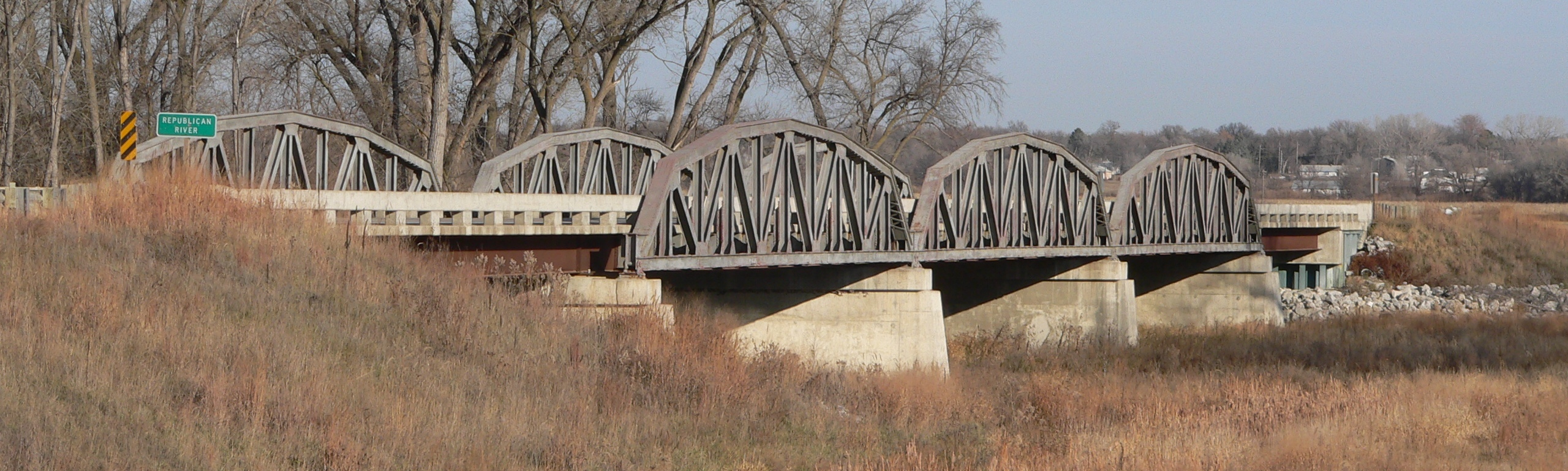
Franklin Bridge over the Republican River

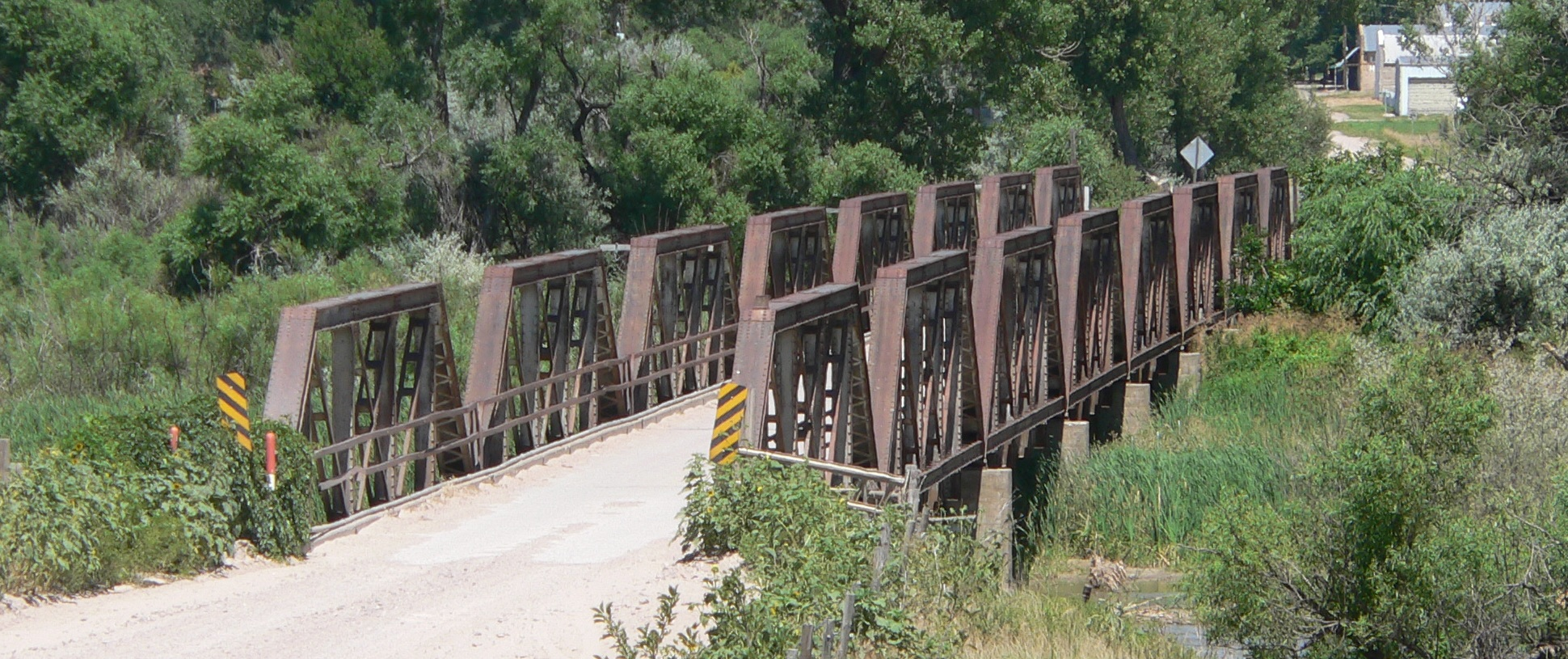
Lisco State Aid Bridge over the North Platte River

More than 20 bridges and other public works projects built or designed by the Nebraska Department of Transportation and its predecessors, including the Nebraska Department of Roads and the Nebraska Bureau of Roads & Bridges, have been listed on the U.S. National Register of Historic Places. Many were registered after a 1996 study seeking to inventory historic bridges in Nebraska and pursuant to a Multiple Property Submission titled "Highway Bridges in Nebraska." The projects listed on the National Register include:

- Ashland Bridge (1936), Silver Street over Salt Creek, Ashland, Nebraska (Nebraska Bureau of Roads & Bridges)
- Berry State Aid Bridge (1920–1921), county road over the Niobrara River, 10 mi (16 km) northeast of Valentine, Nebraska (Nebraska Bureau of Roads & Bridges)
- Brownson Viaduct (1942), Nebraska Highway Spur 17A over U.S. Route 30 and Union Pacific Railroad tracks, .8 mi (1.3 km) northwest of Brownson, Nebraska (Nebraska Bureau of Highways)
- Bryan Bridge (1932), U.S. Route 20, Valentine, Nebraska (Nebraska Division of Bridge Design)
- Burwell Bridge (1940–1941), Nebraska Highway 11 over the North Loup River, Burwell, Nebraska (Nebraska Bureau of Roads & Bridges)
- Columbus Loup River Bridge (1932–1933), U.S. Route 30 over the Loup River, Columbus, Nebraska (Nebraska Bureau of Roads & Bridges)
- Deering Bridge (1916), county road over School Creek, 2 mi (3.2 km) north, 2 mi (3.2 km) east of Sutton, Nebraska (Nebraska Bureau of Roads & Bridges)
- Franklin Bridge (1932, 1935), Nebraska Highway 10 over the Republican River, 1 mi (1.6 km) south of Franklin, Nebraska (Nebraska Bureau of Roads & Bridges)
- Henry State Aid Bridges (1919), Nebraska Highway 86 over the North Platte River, .6 mi (0.97 km) south of Henry, Nebraska (Nebraska Bureau of Roads & Bridges)
- Kilgore Bridge (1915), Nebraska Highway 10 over North Channel Platte River, 7.1 mi (11.4 km) southeast of Kearney, Nebraska (Nebraska Dept. of Roads)
- Lewellen State Aid Bridge (1926–1927), county road over North Platte River, 1 mi (1.6 km) south of Lewellen, Nebraska (Nebraska Bureau of Roads & Bridges)
- Lewis Bridge (1922), county road over the Keya Paha River, 13.6 mi (21.9 km) northeast of Springview, Nebraska and Wewela, South Dakota (Nebraska Bureau of Roads & Bridges)
- Lisco State Aid Bridge (1927–1928), county road over the North Platte River, .6 mi (0.97 km) south of Lisco, Nebraska (Nebraska Bureau of Roads & Bridges)
- Main Street Bridge (1915, 1920), Main St. over W. Papillion Creek, Elkhorn, Nebraska (State of Nebraska)
- Red Cloud Bridge (1935), Nebraska Highway 281 over the Republican River, 2 mi (3.2 km) south of Red Cloud, Nebraska (Nebraska Highway Dept.)
- Roscoe State Aid Bridge (1934–1935), State Link 51B over the South Platte River, .5 mi (0.80 km) southeast of Roscoe, Nebraska (Nebraska Bureau of Roads & Bridges)
- Saddle Creek Underpass (1934), U.S. Route 6 (Dodge St.) over Saddle Creek Rd., Omaha, Nebraska (State of Nebraska)
- Stewart Bridge (1915), county road over Big Sandy Creek, 1 mi (1.6 km) east and 8 mi (13 km) north of Oak, Nebraska (Nebraska Highway Dept.)
- Sutherland State Aid Bridge, county road over the North Platte River, 4.2 mi (6.8 km) north of Sutherland, Nebraska (Nebraska Bureau of Roads & Bridges)
- Tekamah City Bridge (1934), U.S. Route 75 over Tekamah Creek, Tekamah, Nebraska (Nebraska Dept. of Roads)
- York Subway (1938–1939), 14th and 15th Streets and Burlington Northern Railroad tracks over U.S. Route 81, York, Nebraska (Nebraska Bureau of Roads & Bridges)

== See also ==
- List of bridges on the National Register of Historic Places in Nebraska
- List of state agencies of Nebraska
- List of state highways in Nebraska
- Nebraska State Patrol
- U.S. Department of Transportation
