= List of historic bridges in Nebraska =

This is a list of historic bridges in the U.S. state of Nebraska.

== Bridges ==
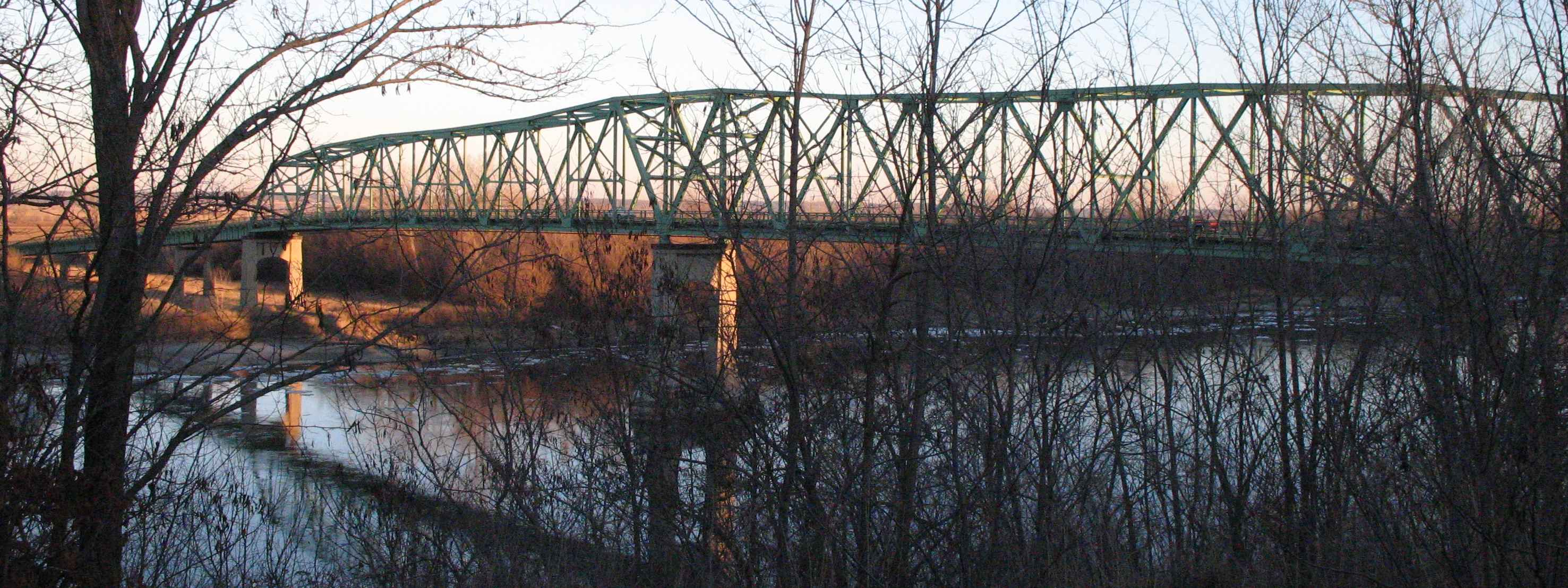
Brownville Bridge from the north on the Nebraska side.

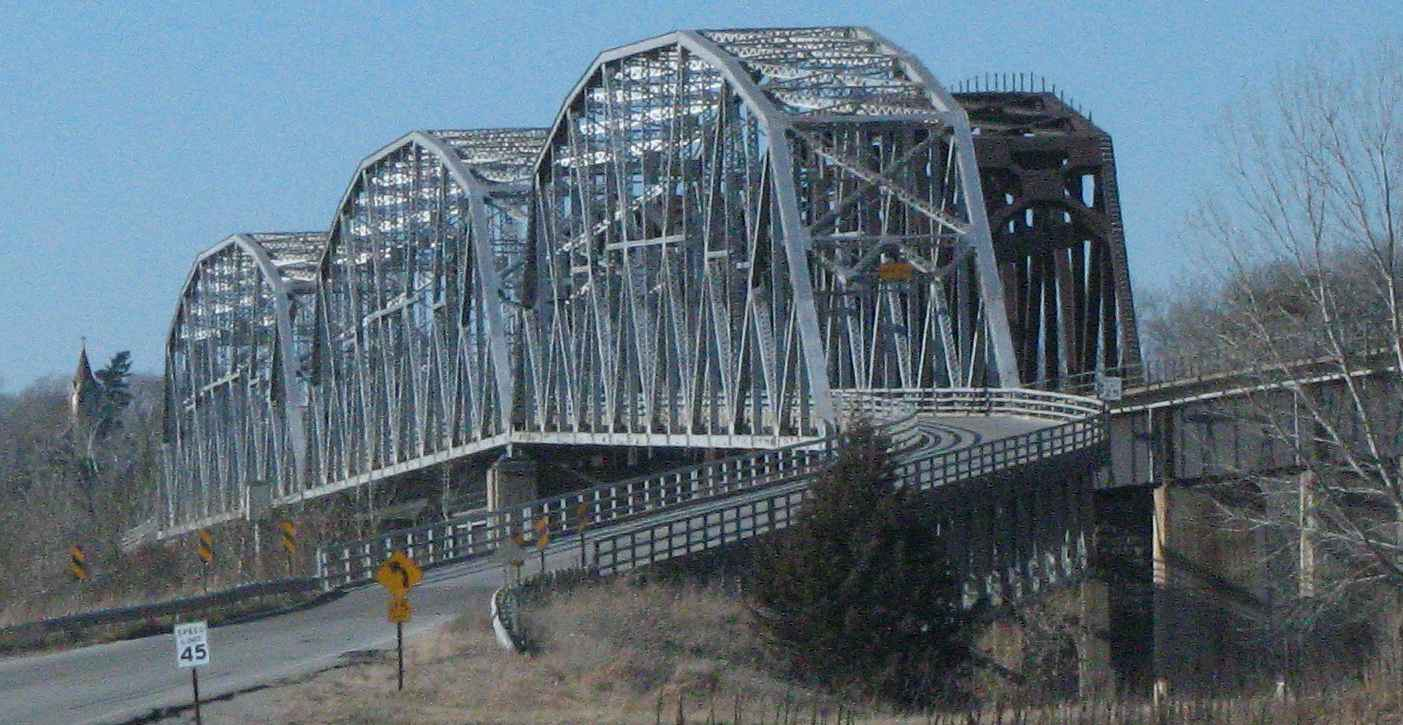
Rulo Bridge from the Missouri side. The Burlington Northern bridge is the dark bridge to the right (north).

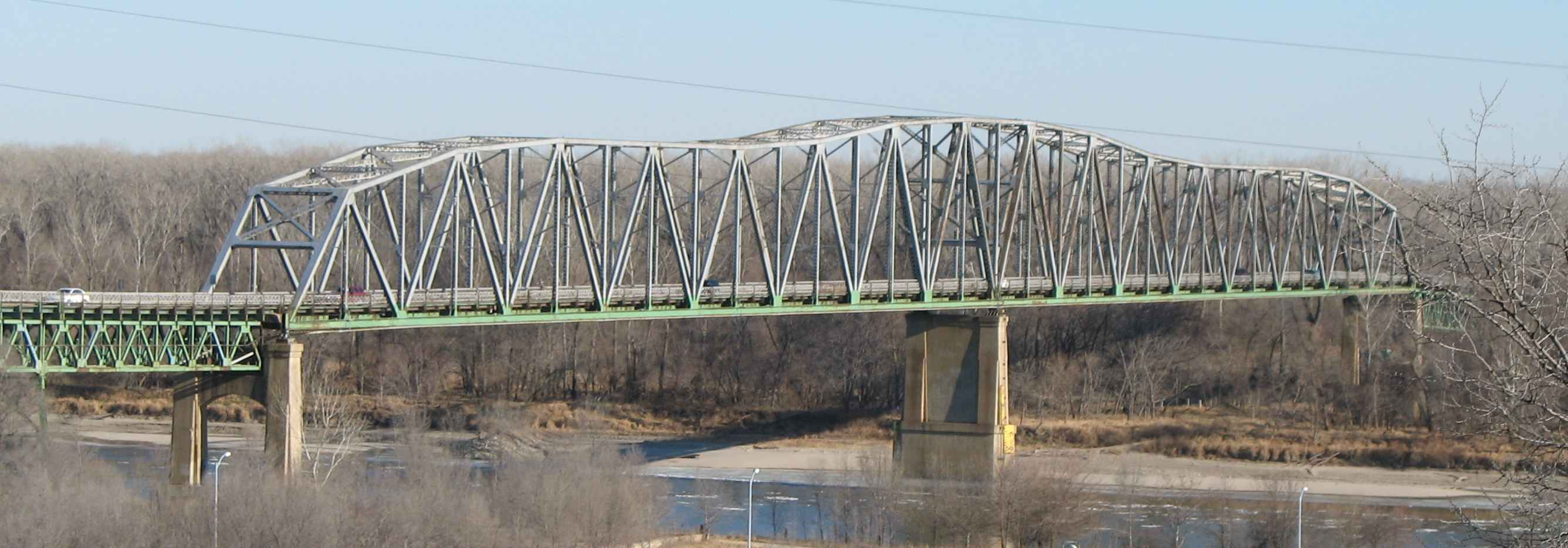
South Omaha Veterans Memorial Bridge from south on Nebraska side.

Bridges in Nebraska - alphabetical order
Name	Nearest town or city	County	Built	Additional information
Bell Bridge	Valentine	Cherry County		
Berry State Aid Bridge	Valentine	Cherry County		
Big Blue River Bridge	Grafton	Fillmore County		
Borman Bridge		Cherry County		
Brewer Bridge		Cherry County		
Brownson Viaduct		Cheyenne County		
Brownville Bridge		Nemaha County		
Bryan Bridge		Cherry County		
Carns State Aid Bridge		Rock County		
Clear Creek/Platte River Bridge		Butler County		
Columbus Loup River Bridge		Platte County		
Deering Bridge		Clay County		
Dewitt Mill Bridge		Gage County		
Dodge Street Overpass		Douglas County		
Elkhorn River Bridge		Antelope County		
Franklin Bridge		Franklin County		
Gross State Aid Bridge		Knox County		
Hoyt Street Bridge		Gage County		
Kilgore/Platte River Bridge		Buffalo County		
Lewellen State Aid Bridge		Garden County		
Lisco State Aid Bridge		Garden County		
Loosveldt Bridge		Sheridan County		
Loup River Bridge		Howard County		
Meridian Bridge		Cedar County		
Mitchell State Aid Bridge		Scotts Bluff County		
Neligh Mill Bridge		Antelope County		
Nine Bridges Bridge		Hall County		
North Loup Bridge		Valley County		
O Street Viaduct		Douglas County		
Olive Branch Bridge		Lancaster County		
Platte River Bridge		Hall County		
Red Cloud Bridge		Webster County		
Roscoe State Aid Bridge		Keith County		
Rulo Bridge		Richardson County		
Sargent Bridge		Custer County		
South Omaha Bridge		Douglas County		
Sutherland State Aid Bridge		Lincoln County		
Sweetwater Mill/Mud Creek Bridge		Buffalo County		
Tekamah City Bridge		Burt County		
Twin Bridge		Cherry County		
unnamed bridge		Otoe County		
unnamed bridge		Otoe County		
Wolf Creek Bridge		Otoe County		
Wyoming Bridge		Otoe County		
York Subway	York	York County		

== See also ==
- Category:State highways in Nebraska
