= Franklin Bridge =

Franklin Bridge may refer to:

- Franklin Bridge (Nebraska) in Franklin County
- Franklin Bridge (band)
- Benjamin Franklin Bridge between Philadelphia and Camden

== See also ==
- Franklin Avenue Bridge in Minneapolis
- Franklin Street Bridge in Chicago
