= NDOT =

NDOT may refer to the Department of Transportation in either one of two US States:

- Nevada Department of Transportation, the Department of Transportation of the State of Nevada
- Nebraska Department of Transportation, the newly-formed Department of Transportation of the US State of Nebraska
