= Brownville Bridge =

- U.S. National Register of Historic Places
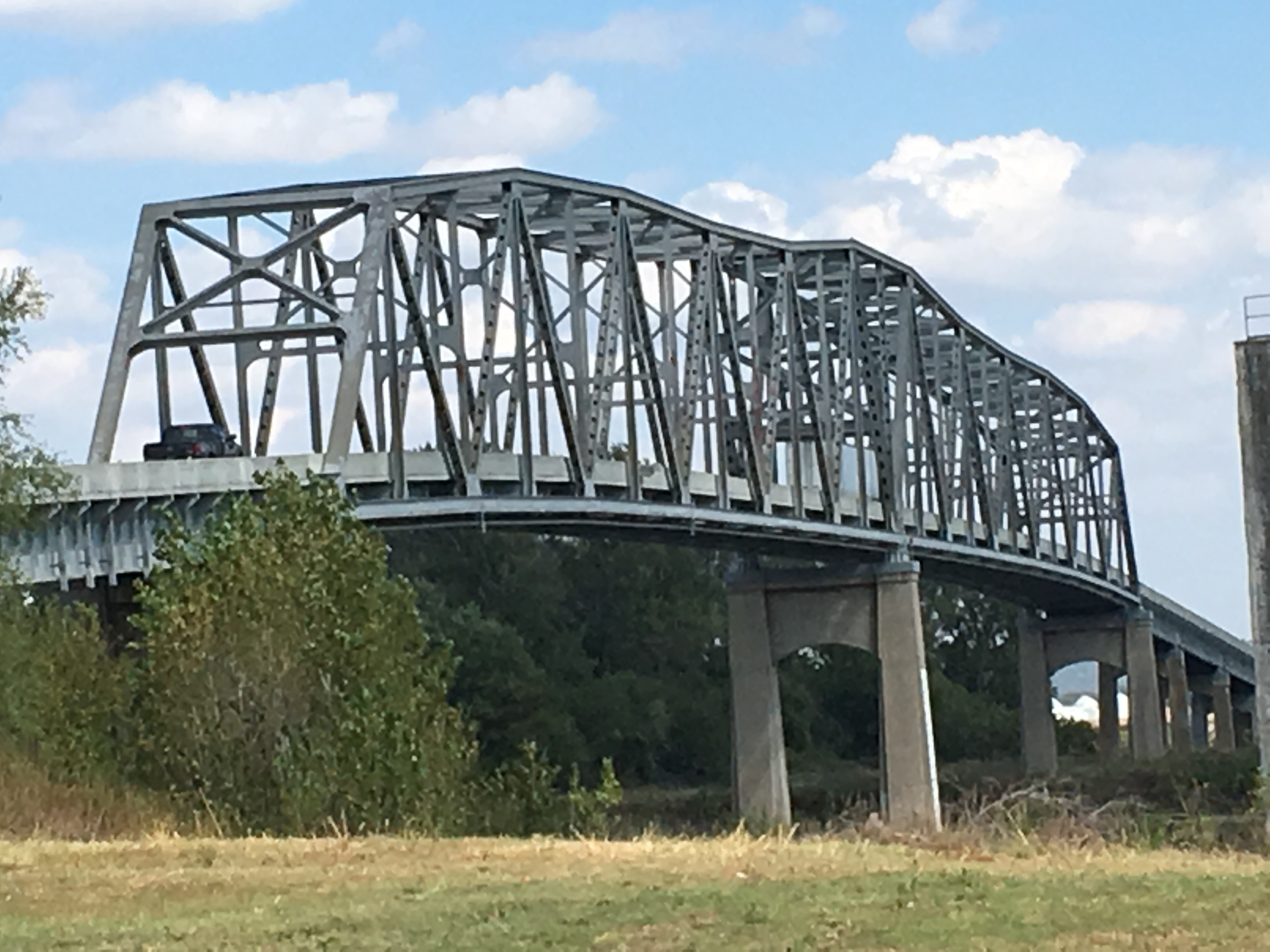
- Brownville Bridge from the north in Brownville, Nebraska

- Location within Nebraska Location within the United States
- Location: US 136 over the Missouri River, Brownville, Nebraska to Atchison County, Missouri
- Coordinates: 40°23′57″N 95°39′6″W
- Built: 1939
- Architect: Multiple
- MPS: Highway Bridges in Nebraska MPS
- NRHP reference No.: 93000536
- Added to NRHP: June 17, 1993

The Brownville Bridge is a truss bridge over the Missouri River on U.S. Route 136 (US 136) from Nemaha County, Nebraska, to Atchison County, Missouri, at Brownville, Nebraska.

It was built in 1939 by Atchison County, at a cost of $700,000 and was originally run as a toll bridge. The structure was designed by HNTB. Bethlehem Steel Co. built the superstructure, while C.F. Lytle Co. built the substructure, and C.W. Atkinson Paving Co. completed the approaches. It has since been converted from a toll bridge to become a free crossing maintained by the Missouri Department of Transportation.

The bridge is extremely narrow, with no shoulders and only one 8-foot (2.4-m) lane in each direction and a total deck width of 22.6 ft (6.9 m). A cantilevered Warren through truss, the bridge's longest span is 419.8 ft (128 m). The total length is 1,903.3 ft (580 m).

The bridge underwent extensive repairs in 2009–10. The deck was replaced, along with pier and steel structure repair.

It was listed on the National Register of Historic Places in 1993. The bridge was closed to all traffic for 216 days from March 2019 to October 2019 as a result of the 2019 Midwestern U.S. floods' damage to the approaches.

== See also ==
- List of crossings of the Missouri River
- List of historic bridges in Nebraska
- List of bridges on the National Register of Historic Places in Nebraska
- List of bridges on the National Register of Historic Places in Missouri
- National Register of Historic Places listings in Nemaha County, Nebraska
- National Register of Historic Places listings in Atchison County, Missouri
