= Big Blue River Bridge (Grafton, Nebraska) =

- U.S. National Register of Historic Places
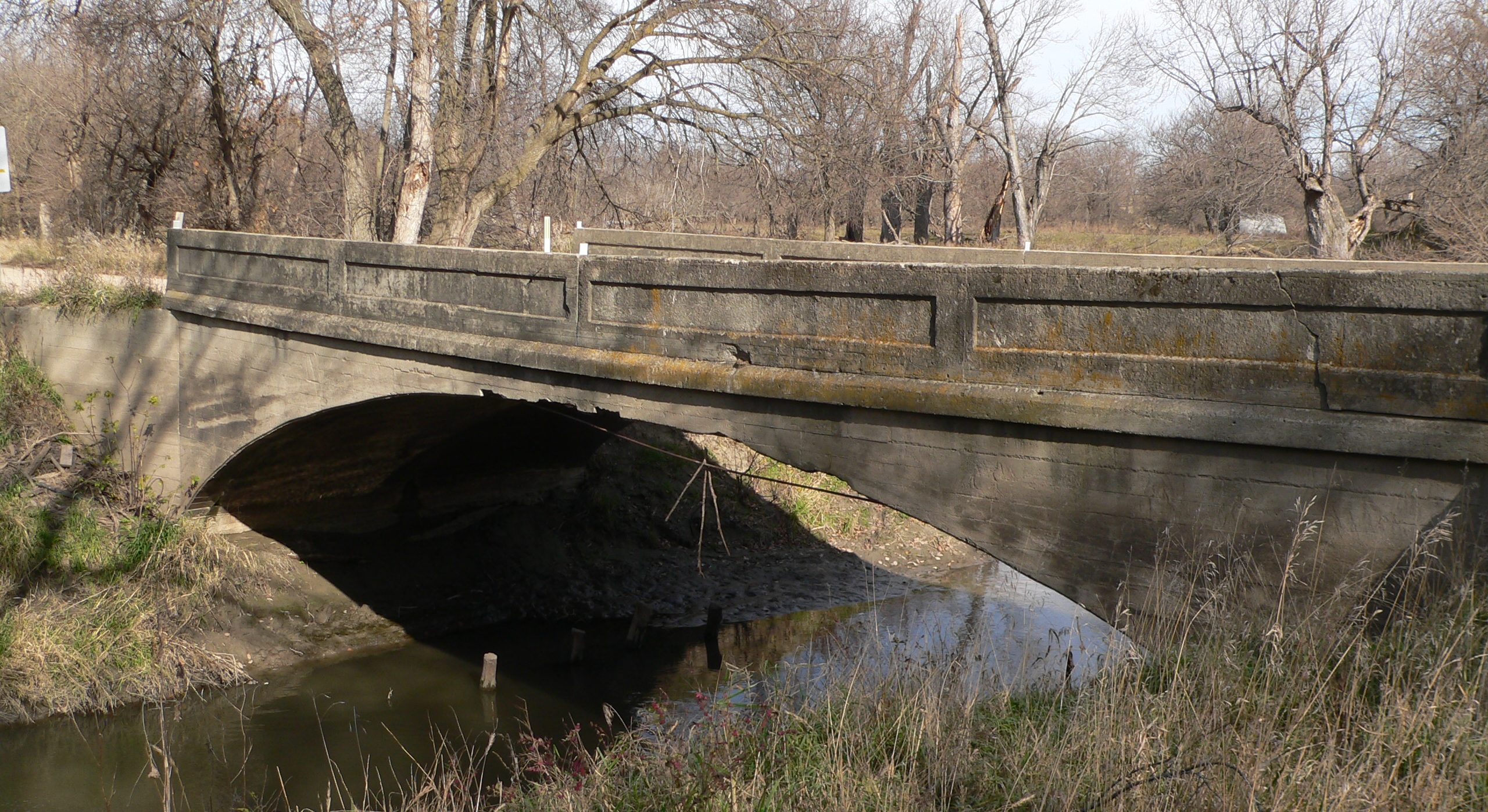
- The bridge as seen from the northeast

- Location within Nebraska Location within the United States
- Location: Fillmore County Road 6, northwest of Grafton, Nebraska, U.S.A.
- Coordinates: 40°41′46.5″N 97°43′45.4″W
- Area: Less than 1 acre (0.40 ha)
- Built: 1918
- Architect: William A. Biba
- NRHP reference No.: 92000745
- Added to NRHP: June 29, 1992

The Big Blue River Bridge is a National Register of Historic Places-listed bridge located in Fillmore County, Nebraska, near the village of Grafton. The bridge is one of two listed on the Register within Fillmore County, the other being the Deering Bridge. The bridge is a single-span, concrete, spandrel arch facility. The site was first designed by state engineers in 1917, and was constructed in 1918. At the time of the construction, the facility's architectural style was the main bridge design in the state. The bridge still retains all original building materials, and has only undergone slight maintenance since construction. The bridge carries Fillmore County Road 6 over the West Fork of the Big Blue River.

== Location and description ==
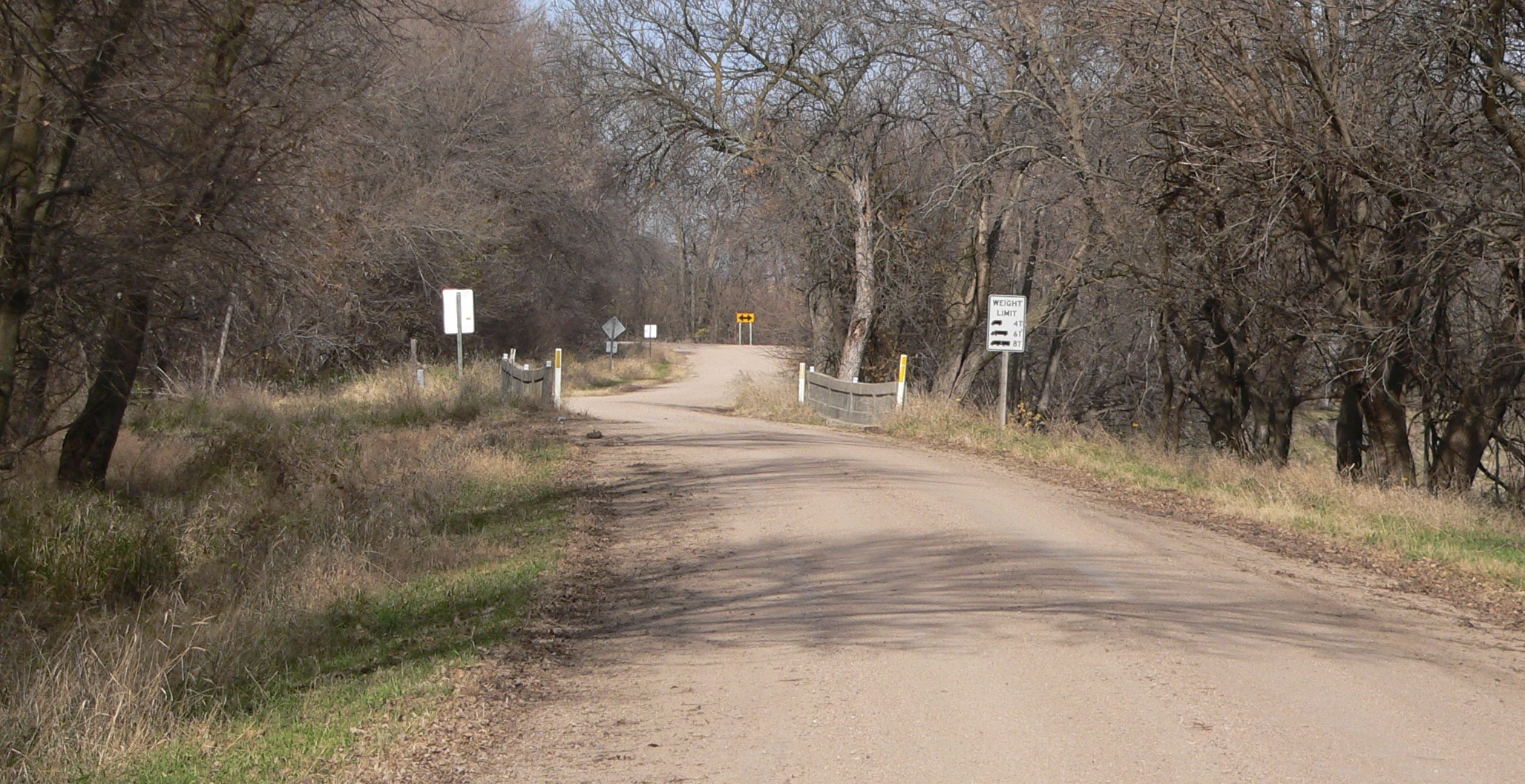
Fillmore County Road 6 and the Big Blue River Bridge

The Big Blue River Bridge is located in the Grafton Township, in the northwestern portion of Fillmore County. The bridge is located approximately five miles north and one mile west of the village of Grafton, or approximately 4.75 miles (7.64 km) directly northwest of Grafton. The facility is located along Fillmore County Road 6 (CR 6), and is about 0.2 miles (0.32 km) from CR 6's northern terminus at County Road 1, and about 29.3 miles (47.2 km) north of CR 6's southern terminus at Thayer County Road AA. The site is rectangular shaped, with dimensions of 52 feet (16 m) by 22 feet (6.7 m), which contains only the bridge.

The Big Blue River Bridge carries CR 6 over the West Fork of the Big Blue River. The bridge is located just west of School Creek's confluence with the river. The facility carries the road's single lane. The bridge consists of a single-span, concrete filled spandrel arch, with a substructure consisting of two abutments and several flared wingwalls. The span has a length of 50 feet (15 m) while the bridge has a total length of 52 feet (16 m). The roadway width along the bridge is 20 feet (6.1 m). The facility's floor is covered with gravel filled with dirt, the same substance as the surface of the road. The bridge structure also contains a solid, concrete, rectangular parapet.

== History ==
=== Background ===
Starting in the early 1900s, Fillmore County began experimenting in designing bridges constructed entirely of concrete. Starting from around 1914, concrete became the exclusive construction material for bridges in the county. The main designs for the concrete bridges were arches and slab spans. This building style remained the main design for the county's bridges until 1920. The style was largely due to the state of Nebraska's reliance on concrete to construct bridges, which was believed to be more durable than steel, which was usually used to construct bridges at the time.

=== Planning and construction ===
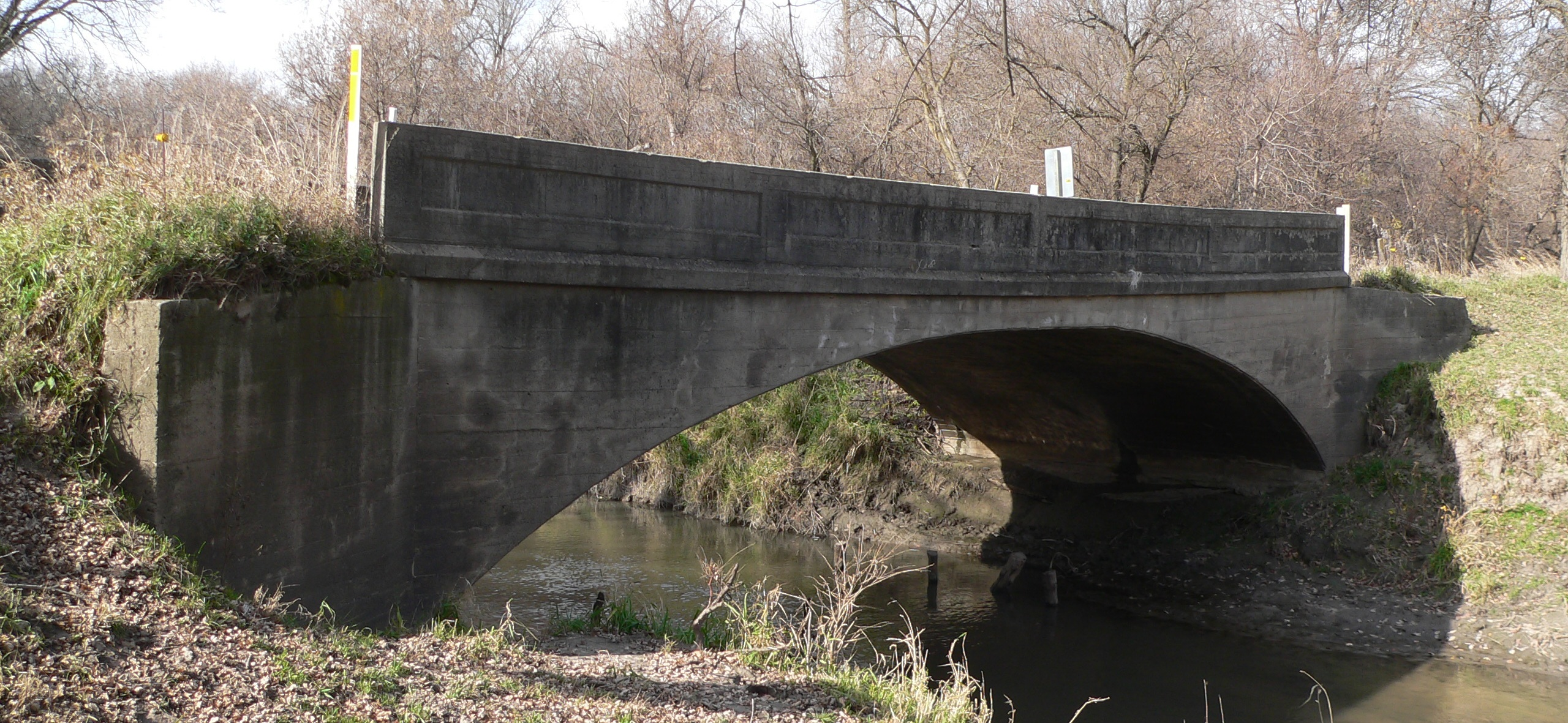
Big Blue River Bridge

Fillmore County's reliance on concrete bridges began to decrease when it hired William A. Biba as its county engineer. Biba began experimenting with different bridge designs, and constructed all of the county's bridges until 1931. The first plan for a bridge over the Big Blue River's west fork was drawn up in June 1917. The bridge consisted of a single concrete arch 40 feet (12 m) in length, which would pass between Grafton Township's Sections 1 and 2. However, no documentation exists to show that the bridge was constructed. In early May 1918, the plan was introduced for the construction of the Big Blue River Bridge, engineered by Biba. The plan was approved by the County Commissioners Court later that month, and awarded a $4,250 contract (equivalent to $91,000 respectively in 2025) to local contractor Frank N. Craven. He constructed the bridge later that year. Aside from minor maintenance repairs, the bridge has remained unaltered since its construction, and continues to carry vehicular traffic. Its condition is considered "good".

== Significance ==
The Big Blue River Bridge was added to the National Register of Historic Places (NRHP) on June 29, 1992. The bridge was nominated under national register criteria C, relating to design and construction. The facility's historic significance is architecture and engineering with an area of significance under engineering. Its historic function is considered to be road-related transportation. The bridge's period of significance is 1918, with a significant date of 1918. The facility is considered to be the best example of about 30 concrete bridges constructed by Biba which remain, and is considered technologically significant due to the fact that it "retains a high degree of integrity of location, design, setting, materials, workmanship, feeling and association". It was one of the first designed by Biba.

== See also ==
- National Register of Historic Places listings in Fillmore County, Nebraska
- List of bridges on the National Register of Historic Places in Nebraska
