= Lewis Bridge (Keya Paha River) =

- U.S. National Register of Historic Places
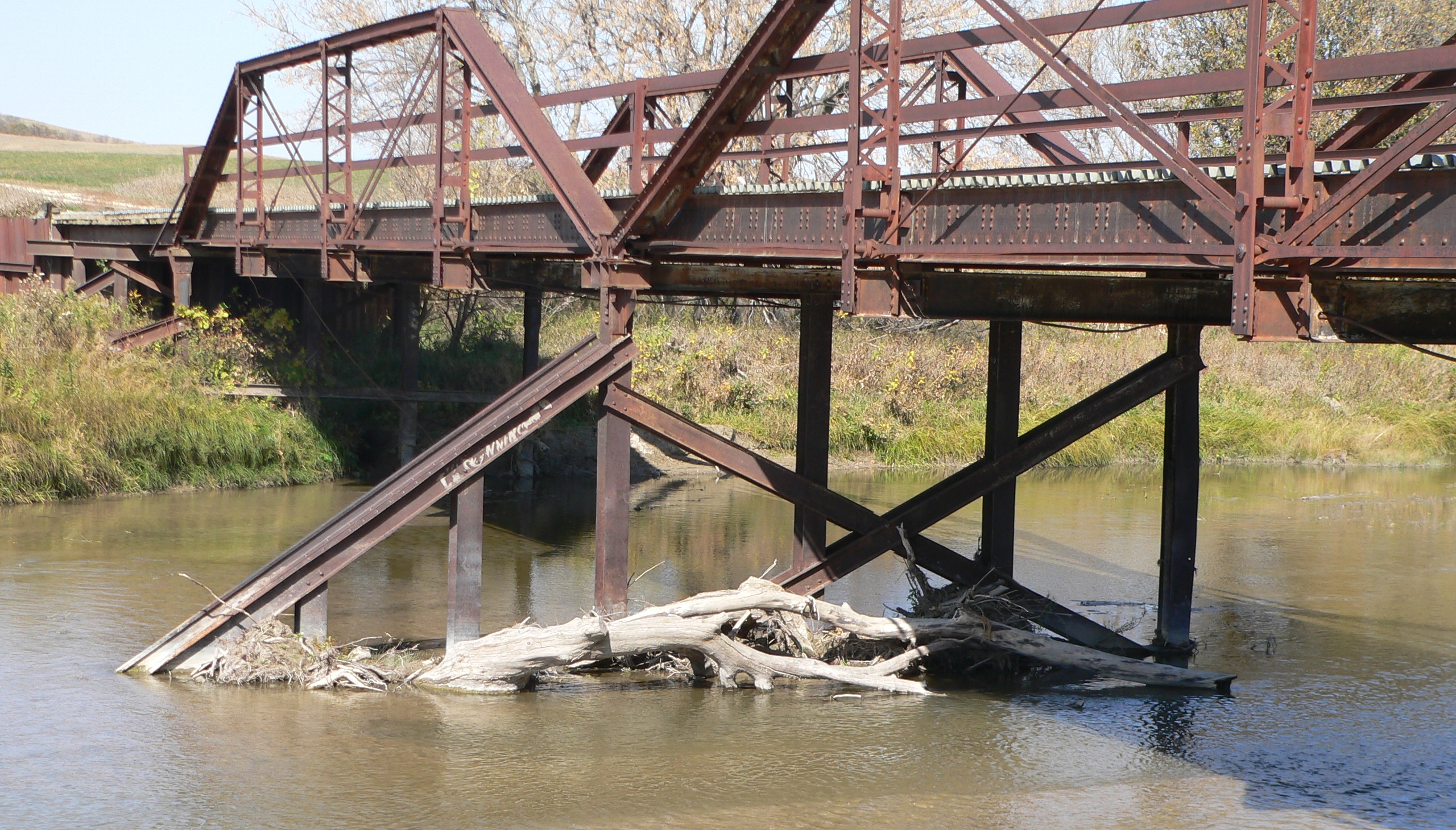
- Lewis Bridge

- Location within South Dakota Location within the United States
- Nearest city: Wewela, South Dakota
- Coordinates: 42°59′53″N 99°38′8″W
- Area: less than one acre
- Built: 1922; 104 years ago
- Architect: Nebraska Bureau of Roads & Bridges; Et al.
- Architectural style: Pratt pony truss
- MPS: Highway Bridges in Nebraska MPS
- NRHP reference No.: 92000774
- Added to NRHP: June 29, 1992

The Lewis Bridge over the Keya Paha River is a historic bridge listed on the National Register of Historic Places in 1992.

The bridge carries a county road over the Keya Paha River, 13.6 miles (21.9 km) northeast of Springview, Nebraska, spanning between Keya Paha County, Nebraska and Tripp County, South Dakota.
