= North Omaha Creek Bridge =

- Formerly listed on the U.S. National Register of Historic Places
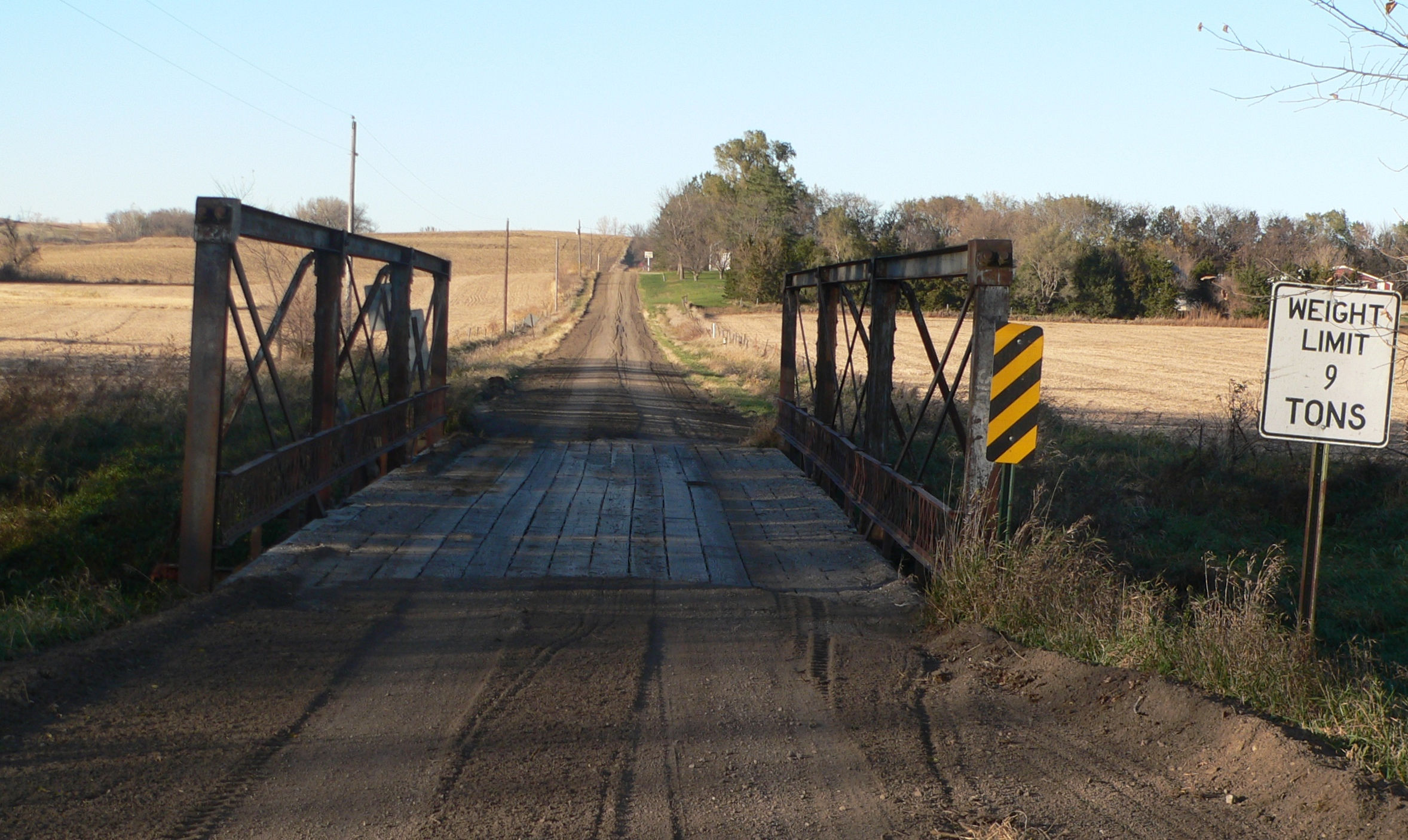
- Photo in October 2010

- Location within Nebraska Location within the United States
- Location: Township road over the North Omaha Creek, 3 miles (4.8 km) southwest of Winnebago, Nebraska
- Coordinates: 42.194044°N 96.531003°W
- Area: less than one acre
- Built: 1905
- Built by: Standard Bridge Co.
- Architectural style: Pin-connected Pratt truss
- MPS: Highway Bridges in Nebraska MPS
- NRHP reference No.: 92000727

Significant dates
- Added to NRHP: June 29, 1992
- Removed from NRHP: March 25, 2019

The North Omaha Creek Bridge was a historic Pin-connected Pratt truss bedstead bridge that was built in 1905, located on 26 Road, a north–south rural road in Thurston County, Nebraska.

When photographed in 2010, the bridge was posted with a 9 tonnes (8.9 long tons; 9.9 short tons) weight limit sign.

It was listed on the National Register of Historic Places in 1992, and was delisted in 2019.

The bridge was 80 feet (24 m) long with a roadway 15.4 feet (4.7 m) wide. It had a timber decking over transverse steel I-beam stringers.

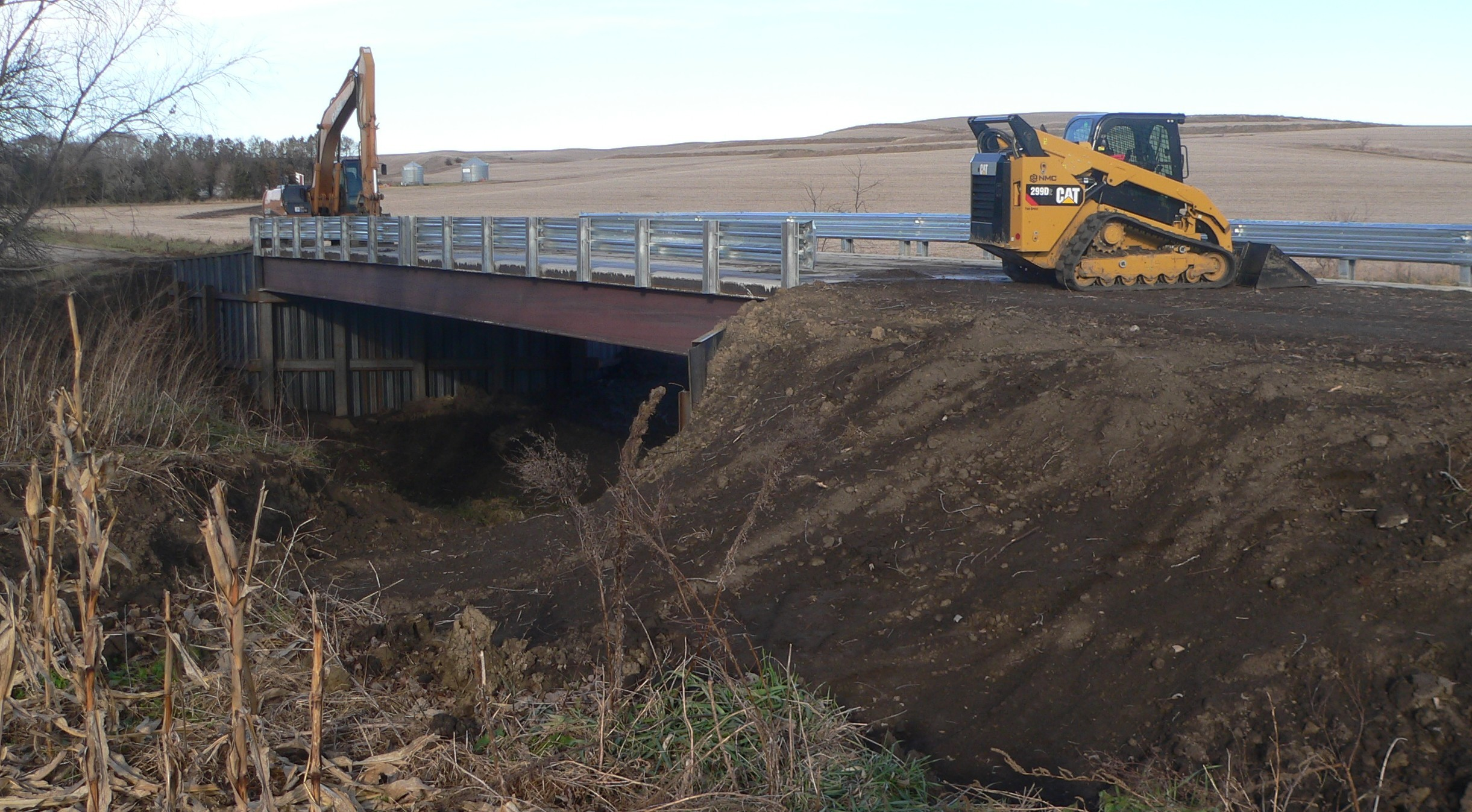
November 2016 photo by same photographer

The bridge is apparently no longer extant, as a November 2016 photo, by the same photographer as in 2010, shows a new bridge under construction.

The location is about 6 miles (9.7 km) (by car travel on existing roads) southwest of Winnebago and 5 miles (8.0 km) northwest of Walthill. (Note: By Google Maps, while the NRHP document states the bridge is about 3 miles southwest of Winnebago.)

== See also ==
- List of bridges on the National Register of Historic Places in Nebraska
- National Register of Historic Places listings in Thurston County, Nebraska
