= Lisco State Aid Bridge =

- U.S. National Register of Historic Places
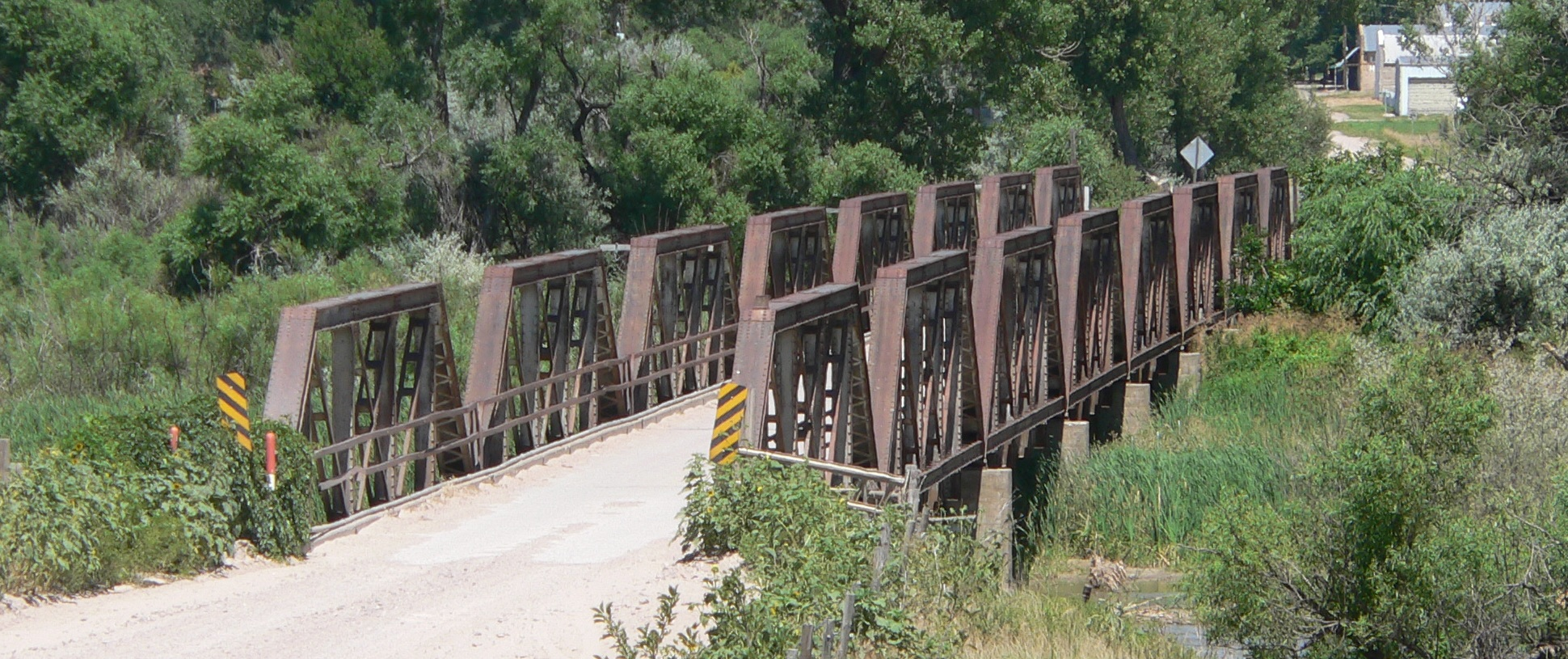
- Lisco State Aid Bridge, seen from the south

- Location within Nebraska Location within the United States
- Nearest city: Lisco, Nebraska
- Coordinates: 41°29′22″N 102°37′30″W
- Built: 1927
- Architect: Nebraska Bureau of Roads & Bridges
- MPS: Highway Bridges in Nebraska MPS
- NRHP reference No.: 92000757
- Added to NRHP: June 29, 1992

The Lisco State Aid Bridge is located on a county road over the North Platte River, south of Lisco, Nebraska, near Rush Creek Ranch. Completed in 1928, the bridge today "is distinguished as an important crossing of the Platte River and one of the last two intact multiple-span state aid truss bridges" in Nebraska.

== History ==
The Nebraska Department of Public Works contracted Western Bridge and Construction Company to begin construction on the Lisco Bridge in October 1927, several months after the company completed the nearby Lewellen State Aid Bridge. One of eight bridges designed by the Nebraska engineer's office using multiple-span Pratt pony trusses, the bridge featured eight 80-foot (24 m) spans that range from 60 to 100 feet (30 m). The bridge measures 641 feet (195 m) long and is 15 feet (4.6 m) wide, and is supported by concrete abutments and piers. Built for $47,600, Western used steel fabricated by the Inland Steel Corporation and completed the project over the winter season. Originally part of the U.S. 6 highway system, the Lisco Bridge now carries a county road.

== See also ==
- Platte River
- List of historic bridges in Nebraska
