= Elkhorn River Bridge =

- U.S. National Register of Historic Places
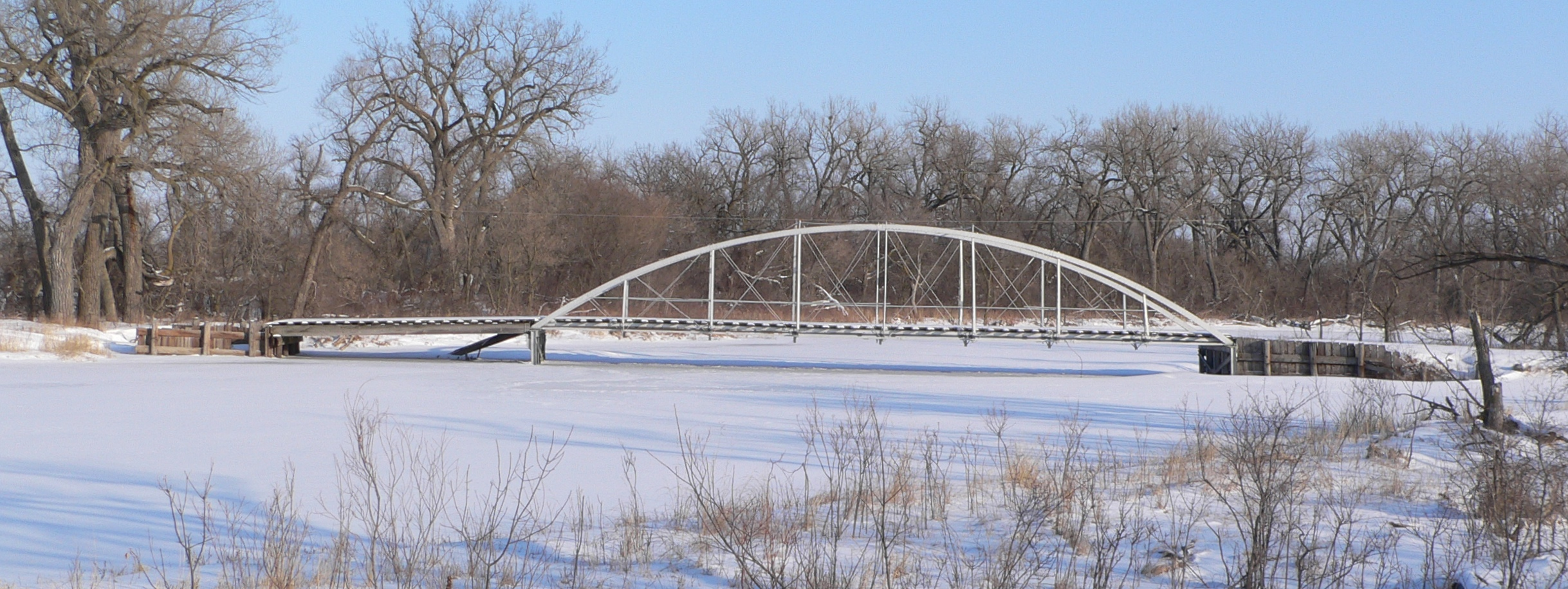

- Location within Nebraska Location within the United States
- Nearest city: Clearwater, Nebraska
- Coordinates: 42.159998°N 98.126072°W
- Area: less than one acre
- Built: {1883
- Built by: King Iron Bridge Co.
- Architectural style: Bowstring through arch-truss
- MPS: Highway Bridges in Nebraska MPS
- NRHP reference No.: 92000771
- Added to NRHP: June 29, 1992

The Elkhorn River Bridge, located on a township road over the Elkhorn River, 3 miles east of Clearwater, Nebraska, was built in 1883 at a cost of $2,050. Also known as Singing Bridge, it is designated NEHBS Number APOO-3. It is a Bowstring through arch truss bridge. It was built by King Iron Bridge Co. It was listed on the National Register of Historic Places in 1992.

It was moved about 5 miles (8.0 km) to its present location in about 1929, and replaced the former Krumm Bridge there. It has locally become known as the "Singing Bridge" because of sound made when driven over.

Cowboy Trail / 519th Avenue now crosses just to the east of the bridge, which now carries no traffic.
