= Ashland Bridge (Ashland, Nebraska) =

- Formerly listed on the U.S. National Register of Historic Places
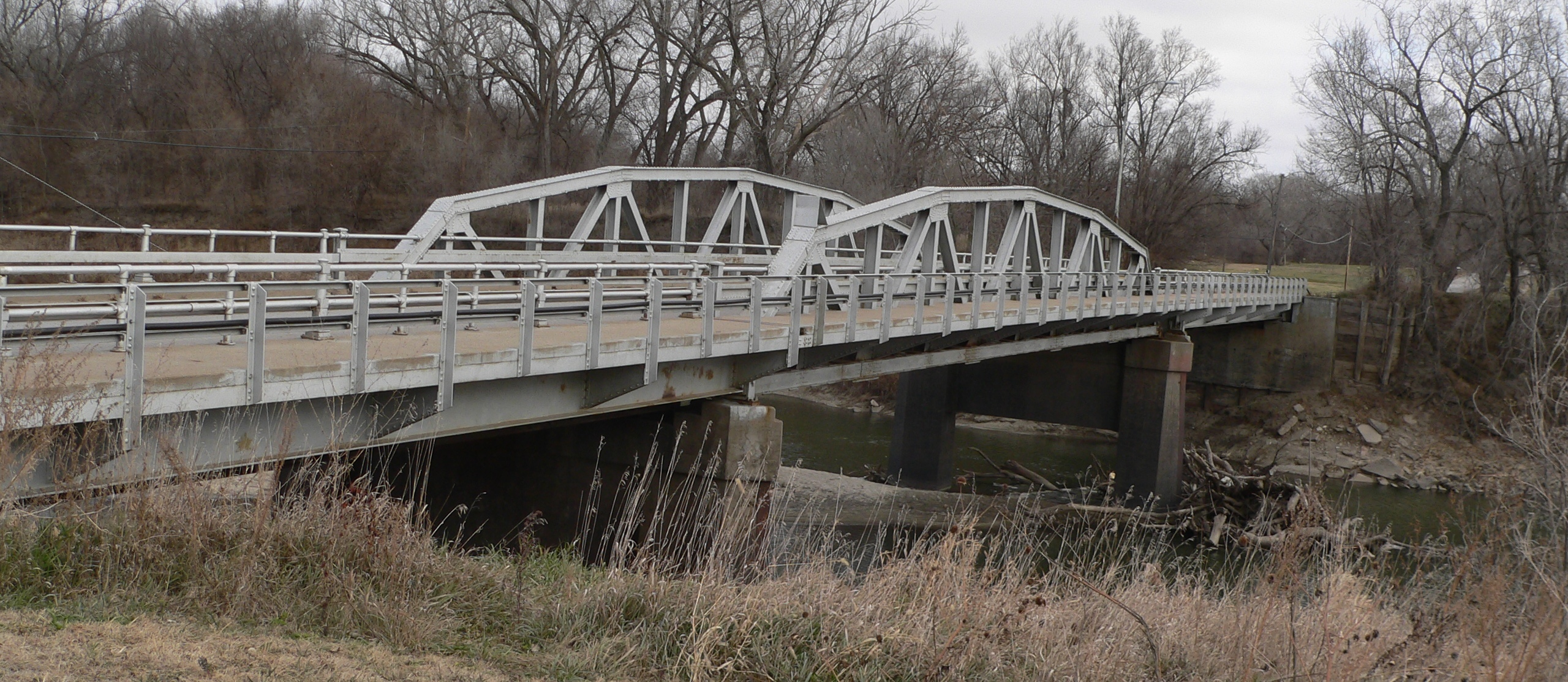
- Ashland Bridge, seen from the southwest; downstream is left

- Location within Nebraska Location within the United States
- Location: Silver St. over Salt Cr., Ashland, Nebraska
- Coordinates: 41.039096°N 96.364501°W
- Area: less than one acre
- Built: 1936
- Architect: Nebraska Bureau of Roads & Bridges; Central Bridge & Construction Co.
- Architectural style: Warren pony truss
- MPS: Highway Bridges in Nebraska MPS
- NRHP reference No.: 92000721

Significant dates
- Added to NRHP: June 29, 1992
- Removed from NRHP: March 3, 2023

The Ashland Bridge in Ashland, Nebraska, also known as Silver Street Bridge, is a pony truss bridge that was built in 1936. It was listed on the National Register of Historic Places in 1992, and was delisted in 2023.

At the time of its listing, it was notable as one of just two surviving Warren truss bridges in Nebraska.
