= Burwell Bridge =

- Formerly listed on the U.S. National Register of Historic Places
- Location within Nebraska Location within the United States
- Location: NE 11 over the N. Loup R., Burwell, Nebraska
- Coordinates: 41.767778°N 99.125278°W
- Area: less than one acre
- Built: 1940-41
- Built by: W.A. Biba Engineering Company
- Architect: Nebraska Bureau of Roads & Bridges
- Architectural style: Steel stringer bridge
- MPS: Highway Bridges in Nebraska MPS
- NRHP reference No.: 92000715

Significant dates
- Added to NRHP: June 29, 1992
- Removed from NRHP: March 25, 2019

The Burwell Bridge was a historic bridge on the northern edge of Burwell in Garfield County, Nebraska which was built in 1940–41. It was a steel girder bridge that brings Nebraska Highway 11 over the North Loup River. It is also known as the North Loup River Bridge and denoted as NEHBS Number GFOO-13. It was listed on the National Register of Historic Places in 1992, and was delisted in 2019.

It was designed by the Nebraska Bureau of Roads & Bridges to replace the previous bridge which had been washed out by floodwaters on June 25, 1939. The bridge is at a 30 degree skew over the river. It has a roadway 24 feet (7.3 m) wide. It has three spans with total span length of 110 feet (34 m) and total bridge length of 290 feet (88 m). The center span is 73 feet (22 m). It has concrete abutments, wingwalls and spill-through piers. It has a concrete deck over steel stringers. It was built by contractor W.A. Biba Engineering Company of Geneva, Nebraska at cost of $44,763.28, using steel from Omaha Steel Works.

According to its NRHP registration, the bridge was deemed notable as one of "the longest cantilevered beam structures identified in the statewide bridge inventory. It is technologically significant for its representation of long-span beam bridge experimentation conducted by the state engineer's office in the 1930s."

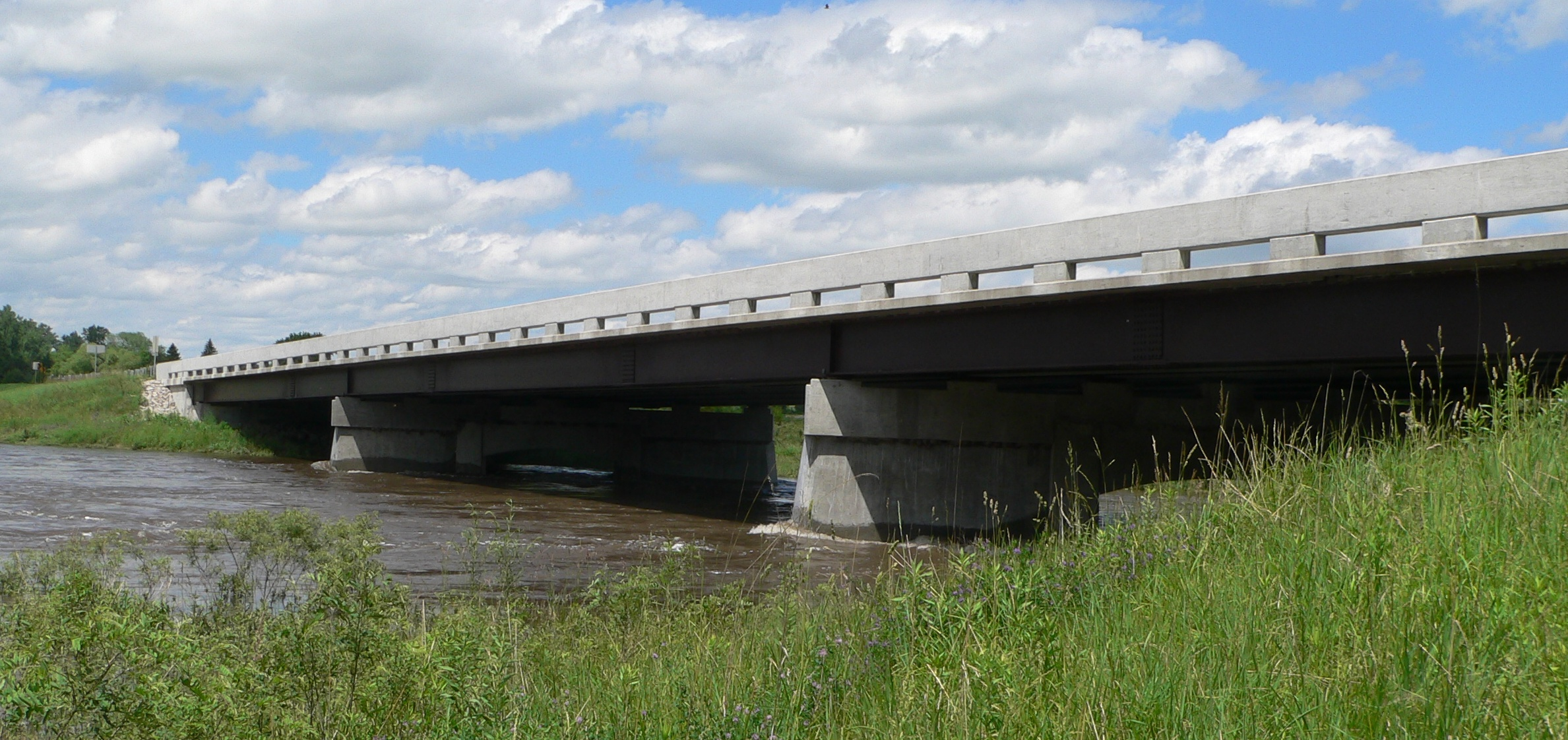
Replacement bridge in 2010

By 2010, however, the bridge appeared to have been replaced by a new reinforced concrete and girder bridge. (Note: Note supporting piers are different from NRHP document photo from 1989; note wingwalls are gone; note bridge deck and railing differ.) Uglybridges.com, a website which uses National Bridge Inventory data, reports the bridge was reconstructed in 2007 and now has a 44.0 feet (13.4 m) wide roadway, with total deck width 46.9 feet (14.3 m). It has a concrete cast-in-place deck.
