= Clearwater, Nebraska =

Village in Nebraska, US

- Village
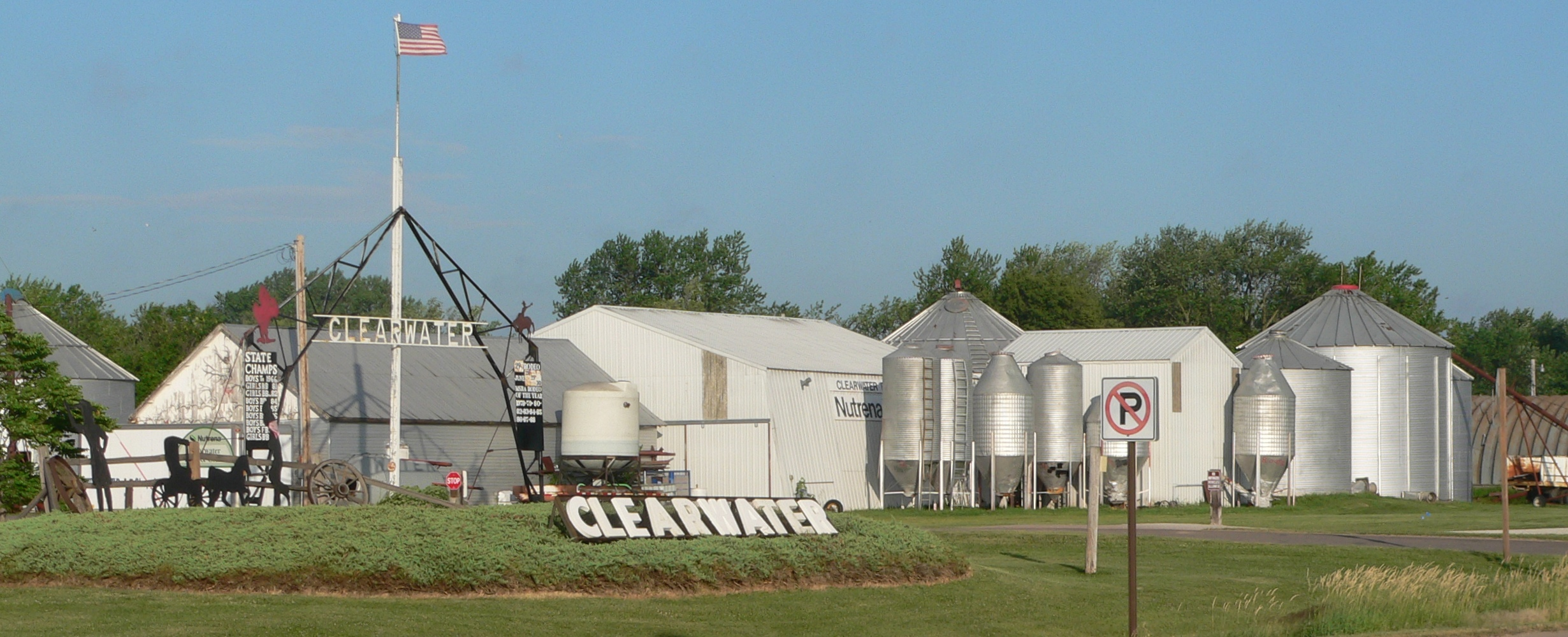
- Grain bins and welcome signs at northern edge of Clearwater
- Nickname: Fullwater, Nebraska
- Location of Clearwater, Nebraska
- Coordinates: 42°10′15″N 98°11′22″W
- Country: United States
- State: Nebraska
- County: Antelope

Area
  - Total: 0.37 sq mi (0.95 km^{2})
  - Land: 0.37 sq mi (0.95 km^{2})
  - Water: 0 sq mi (0.00 km^{2})
- Elevation: 1,791 ft (546 m)

Population (2020)
  - Total: 320
  - Density: 868.8/sq mi (335.44/km^{2})
- Time zone: UTC-6 (Central (CST))
  - Summer (DST): UTC-5 (CDT)
- ZIP code: 68726
- Area code: 402
- FIPS code: 31-09445
- GNIS feature ID: 2397643
- Website: clearwaterne.com

Clearwater is a village in Antelope County, Nebraska, United States. As of the 2020 census, Clearwater had a population of 320.

== History ==
Clearwater was founded in 1881 when the railroad was extended to that point. Its name is descriptive of the quality of water in the creek outside of town.

== Geography ==
According to the United States Census Bureau, the village has a total area of 0.37 square miles (0.96 km^{2}), all land.

== Demographics ==
Historical population
Census	Pop.	Note	%±
1890	215		—
1900	198		−7.9%
1910	414		109.1%
1920	479		15.7%
1930	504		5.2%
1940	568		12.7%
1950	472		−16.9%
1960	418		−11.4%
1970	398		−4.8%
1980	409		2.8%
1990	401		−2.0%
2000	384		−4.2%
2010	419		9.1%
2020	320		−23.6%
U.S. Decennial Census

=== 2010 census ===
At the 2010 census there were 419 people, 157 households, and 109 families in the village. The population density was 1,132.4 inhabitants per square mile (437.2/km^{2}). There were 182 housing units at an average density of 491.9 per square mile (189.9/km^{2}). The racial makup of the village was 93.1% White, 0.2% African American, 0.5% Asian, 5.3% from other races, and 1.0% from two or more races. Hispanic or Latino of any race were 11.5%.

Of the 157 households 35.7% had children under the age of 18 living with them, 56.7% were married couples living together, 10.2% had a female householder with no husband present, 2.5% had a male householder with no wife present, and 30.6% were non-families. 28.0% of households were one person and 14% were one person aged 65 or older. The average household size was 2.67 and the average family size was 3.30.

The median age in the village was 31.9 years. 32.2% of residents were under the age of 18; 7% were between the ages of 18 and 24; 24.5% were from 25 to 44; 23.4% were from 45 to 64; and 13.1% were 65 or older. The gender makeup of the village was 50.8% male and 49.2% female.

=== 2000 census ===
At the 2000 census there were 384 people, 166 households, and 107 families in the village. The population density was 1,048.5 inhabitants per square mile (404.8/km^{2}). There were 187 housing units at an average density of 510.6 per square mile (197.1/km^{2}). The racial makup of the village was 98.96% White, 0.26% Asian, and 0.78% from two or more races. Hispanic or Latino of any race were 0.26%.

Of the 166 households 26.5% had children under the age of 18 living with them, 51.2% were married couples living together, 10.2% had a female householder with no husband present, and 35.5% were non-families. 33.7% of households were one person and 19.3% were one person aged 65 or older. The average household size was 2.31 and the average family size was 2.93.

The age distribution was 28.4% under the age of 18, 6.5% from 18 to 24, 20.8% from 25 to 44, 19.5% from 45 to 64, and 24.7% 65 or older. The median age was 38 years. For every 100 females, there were 87.3 males. For every 100 females age 18 and over, there were 84.6 males.

As of 2000 the median income for a household in the village was $29,375, and the median family income was $36,538. Males had a median income of $28,625 versus $19,500 for females. The per capita income for the village was $12,499. About 15.5% of families and 15.1% of the population were below the poverty line, including 15.2% of those under age 18 and 7.1% of those age 65 or over.

== Climate ==
This climatic region is typified by large seasonal temperature differences, with warm to hot (and often humid) summers and cold (sometimes severely cold) winters. According to the Köppen climate classification system, Clearwater has a humid continental climate, Dfa on climate maps.

== Education ==
Summerland Public Schools formed in 2020 after absorbing the Clearwater school district.

Clearwater was formerly in Nebraska Unified School District 1.

== See also ==
- List of municipalities in Nebraska
