= Roscoe, Nebraska =

- Census-designated place
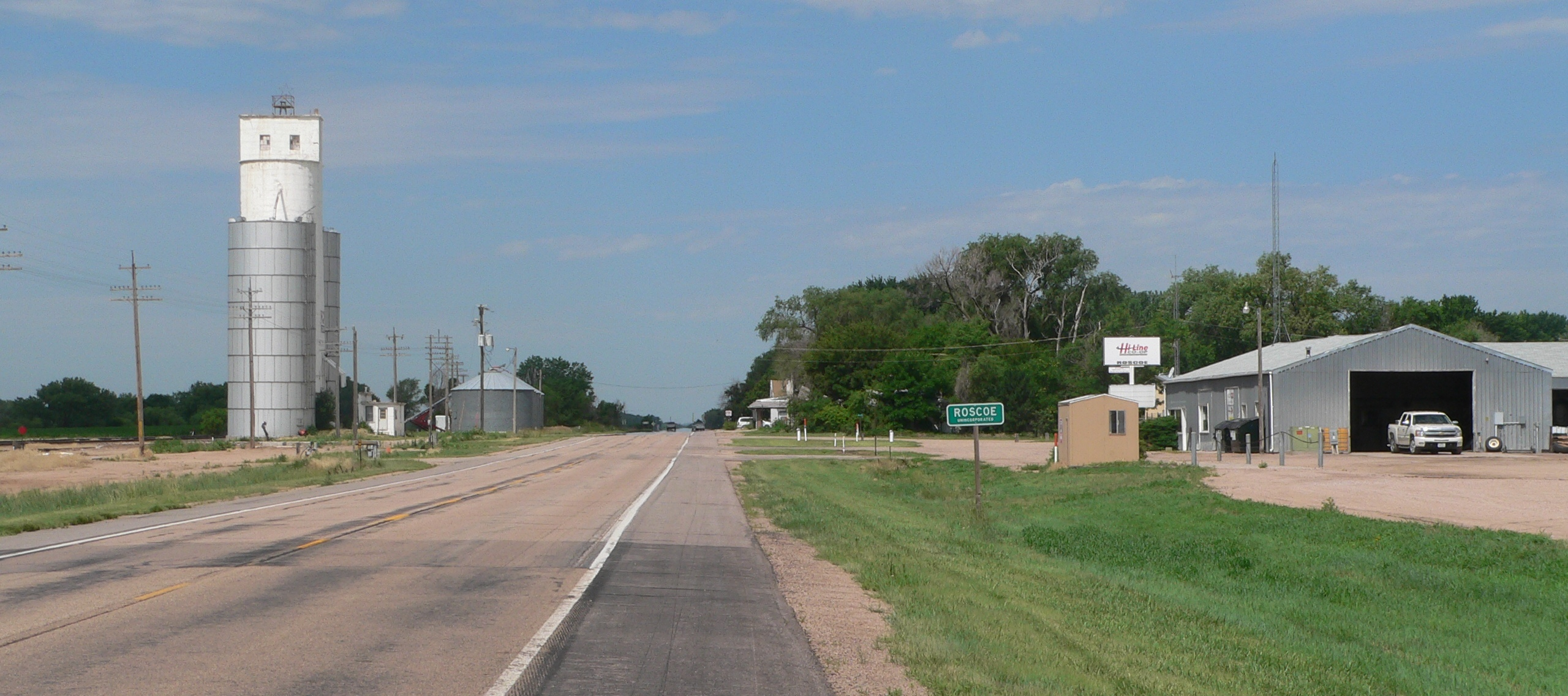
- Roscoe, seen from the east along U.S. Highway 30

- Location within Nebraska Location within the United States
- Coordinates: 41°07′54″N 101°35′07″W
- Country: United States
- State: Nebraska
- County: Keith

Area
  - Total: 0.16 sq mi (0.41 km^{2})
  - Land: 0.16 sq mi (0.41 km^{2})
  - Water: 0 sq mi (0.00 km^{2})
- Elevation: 3,176 ft (968 m)

Population (2020)
  - Total: 44
  - Density: 280/sq mi (108/km^{2})
- Time zone: UTC-7 (Central (CST))
  - Summer (DST): UTC-6 (CDT)
- ZIP Code: 69153
- Area code: 308
- FIPS code: 31-42285
- GNIS feature ID: 2583896

Roscoe is an unincorporated community and census-designated place in Keith County, Nebraska, United States. As of the 2020 census, Roscoe had a population of 44.

== History ==
Roscoe got its start in the 1870s when the railroad was extended to that point.

== Geography ==
Roscoe is in east-central Keith County in the valley of the South Platte River. Its altitude is 3,173 feet (967 m) above sea level. U.S. Route 30 passes through the community, leading west 7 miles (11 km) to Ogallala, the Keith county seat, and east 12 miles (19 km) to Paxton. Nebraska Link 51B leads south 1 mile (1.6 km) across the South Platte River to Interstate 80 at Exit 133.

According to the U.S. Census Bureau, the Roscoe CDP has an area of 0.16 square miles (0.41 km^{2}), all land.

== Demographics ==
Historical population
Census	Pop.	Note	%±
2020	44		—
U.S. Decennial Census
