= Lewellen State Aid Bridge =

- U.S. National Register of Historic Places
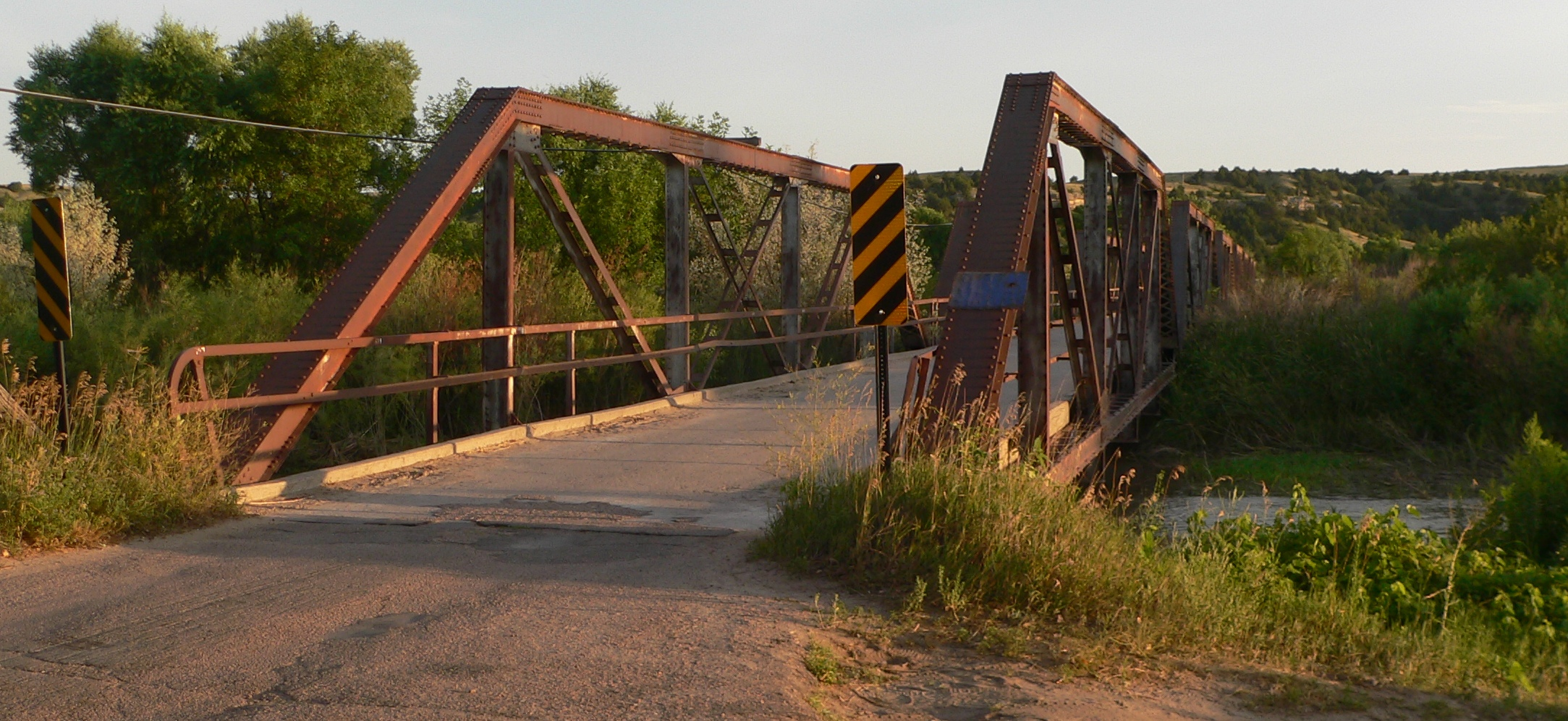

- Location within Nebraska Location within the United States
- Nearest city: Lewellen, Nebraska
- Coordinates: 41°19′03″N 102°08′36″W
- Area: less than one acre
- Built: 1926-27
- Architect: Nebraska Bureau of Roads & Bridges; et al.
- Architectural style: Pratt pony truss
- MPS: Highway Bridges in Nebraska MPS
- NRHP reference No.: 92000756
- Added to NRHP: June 29, 1992

The Lewellen State Aid Bridge, near Lewellen, Nebraska, United States, is a historic Pratt pony truss bridge that was built in 1926. It was listed on the National Register of Historic Places in 1992.

Along with the Lisco State Aid Bridge, it is one of two surviving multiple-span "State Aid" bridges in Nebraska, out of eight constructed. It has seven 100-foot-long "riveted Pratt ponies ... supported by 50-foot long, 8-inch Bethlehem H-piles, encased in concrete". It was built by low bidder on a contract let by Nebraska, for $71,300, during 1926–27.
