= North Loup Bridge =

- U.S. National Register of Historic Places
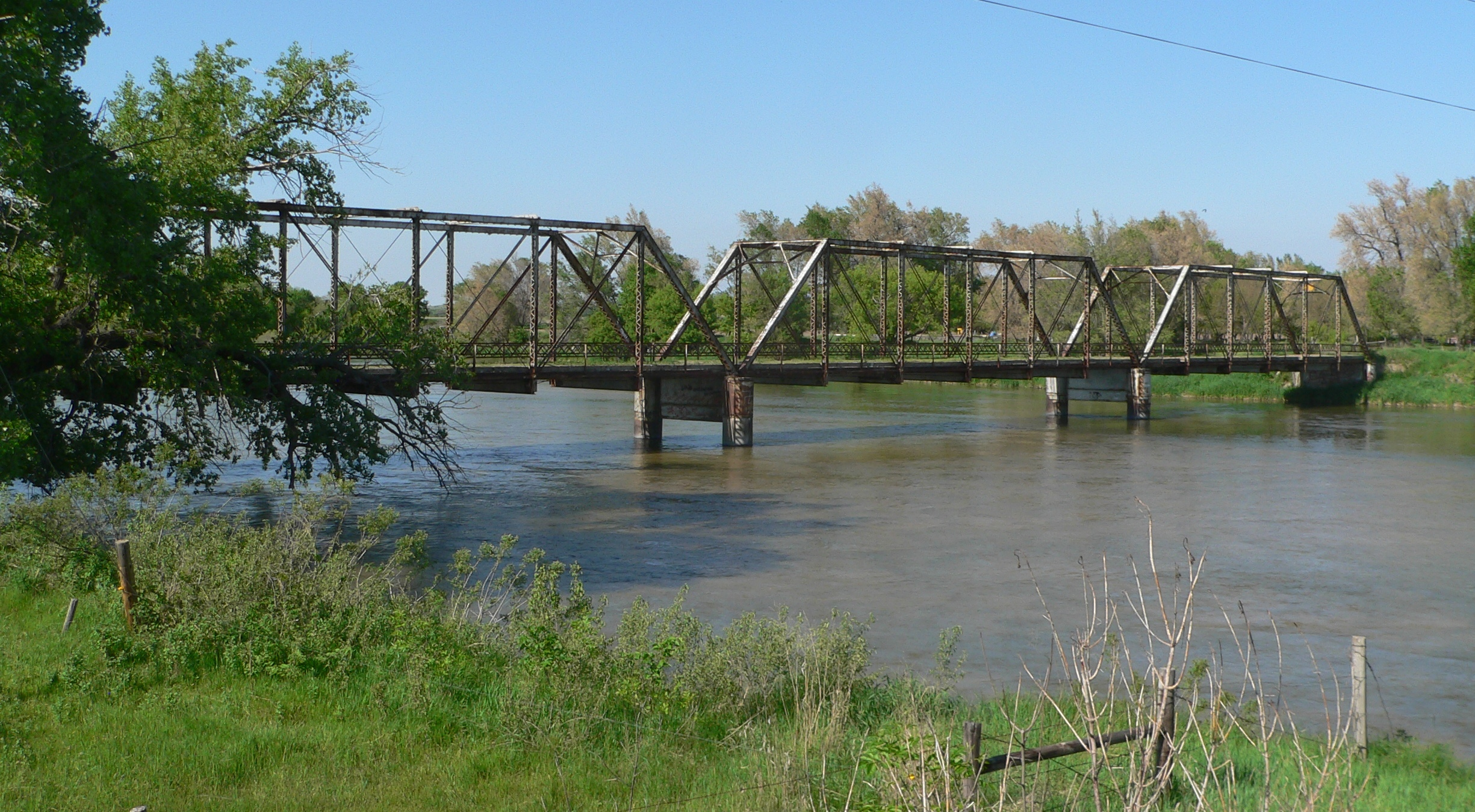

- Location within Nebraska Location within the United States
- Nearest city: North Loup, Nebraska
- Coordinates: 41.51031°N 98.75157°W
- Area: less than one acre
- Built: 1912-1913
- Built by: Cambria & Lackawanna Steel Cos.; Et al.
- Architectural style: Pratt through truss
- MPS: Highway Bridges in Nebraska MPS
- NRHP reference No.: 92000704
- Added to NRHP: June 29, 1992

The North Loup Bridge brings a county road over the North Loup River, about 1.5 miles northeast of the village of North Loup in Valley County, Nebraska. It was built in 1912-1913 by Empire Bridge Company of Omaha, Nebraska, at cost of $13,089, using steel parts fabricated by Cambria Steel Company and Lackawanna Steel Company. It is a Pratt through truss bridge and includes three 100 feet (30 m) through truss spans upon steel cylinder piers. There is also a 40 feet (12 m) pony truss approach span on the south side.

It was listed on the National Register of Historic Places in 1992.
