= Franklin Bridge (Nebraska) =

- Formerly listed on the U.S. National Register of Historic Places
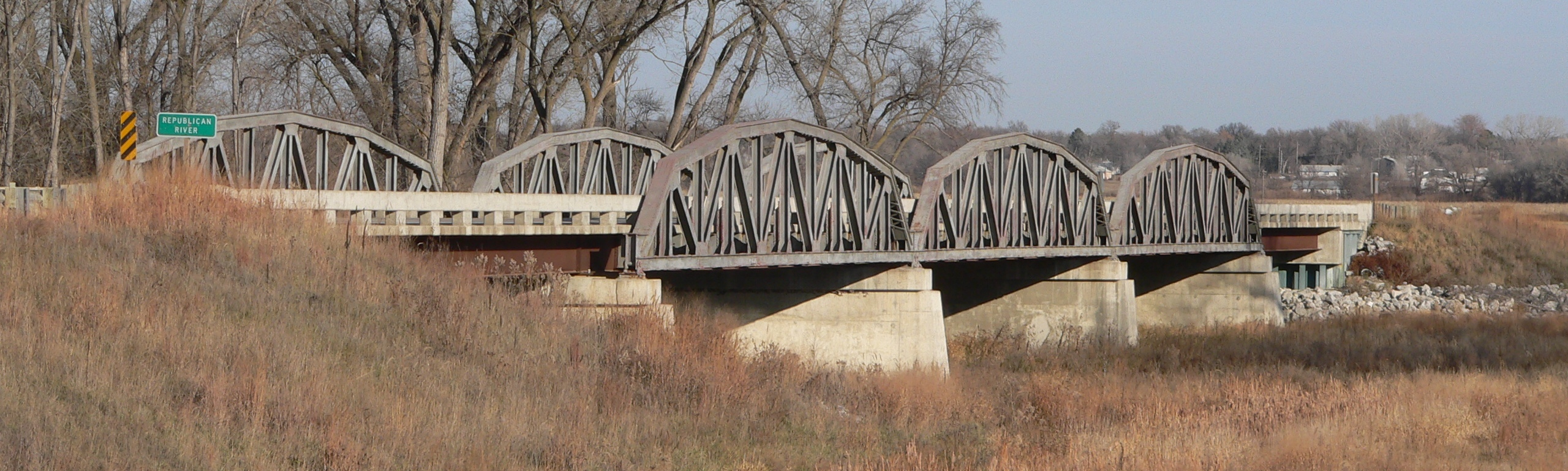

- Location within Nebraska Location within the United States
- Nearest city: Franklin, Nebraska
- Coordinates: 40°4′33″N 98°57′8″W
- Built: 1932
- Architect: Nebraska Bureau of Roads & Bridges
- MPS: Highway Bridges in Nebraska MPS
- NRHP reference No.: 92000764

Significant dates
- Added to NRHP: June 29, 1992
- Removed from NRHP: March 13, 2020

Franklin Bridge is a bridge in Franklin County, Nebraska. The road bridge was built over the Republican River in 1932 and features Warren pony trusses. In 1935, a flood swept away one truss and one approach span. The bridge was listed on the National Register of Historic Places in 1992, and was delisted in 2020.

== See also ==
- List of historic bridges in Nebraska
