= Saddle Creek Underpass =

- U.S. National Register of Historic Places
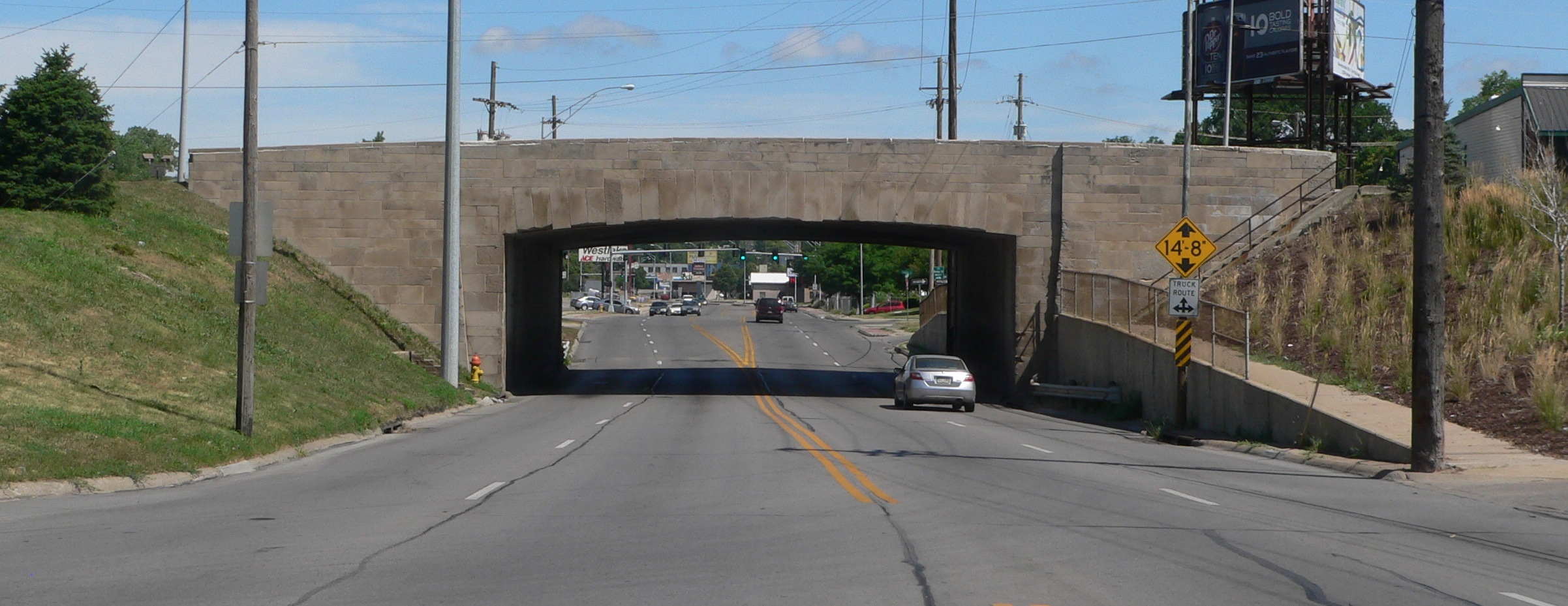
- View from the south, along Saddle Creek Road

- Location within Nebraska Location within the United States
- Location: US 6 (Dodge St.) over Saddle Cr. Rd., Omaha, Nebraska
- Coordinates: 41°15′34.85″N 95°58′49.6″W
- Area: less than one acre
- Built: 1934
- Architect: State of Nebraska
- Architectural style: Concrete rigid frame bridge
- MPS: Highway Bridges in Nebraska MPS
- NRHP reference No.: 92000741
- Added to NRHP: June 29, 1992

The Saddle Creek Underpass is located in the Midtown area of Omaha, Nebraska. Designed to carry Saddle Creek Road under Dodge Street (US 6), the underpass was constructed in 1934 by the Works Progress Administration. It was included on the Bridges in Nebraska Multiple Property Submission on June 29, 1992.

== About ==
The Nebraska Department of Roads Biennial Report of 1933-34 describes the construction of the underpass as featuring "a complete, modern street light system, and interlocking traffic control signal system, two pedestrian subways, and a grade separation of Dodge Street and Saddle Creek Boulevard."

Built by the Works Progress Administration, over 1,175 cubic yards (898 m^{3}) of dirt were excavated to lower Saddle Creek Road sufficiently to pass under the overpass. The project was completed in 1934, and was designed to accommodate the westernmost addition to Omaha's boulevard system, which was originally called Saddle Creek Boulevard. Saddle Creek Road still utilizes the underpass today as it sits between the Morton Meadows and Dundee neighborhoods. As of 2004 the Underpass was the only property listed on the National Register in either neighborhood, although each one has submitted applications to be listed as a historic district.

== See also ==
- Transportation in Omaha
- History of Omaha
