= Brewer Bridge =

- U.S. National Register of Historic Places
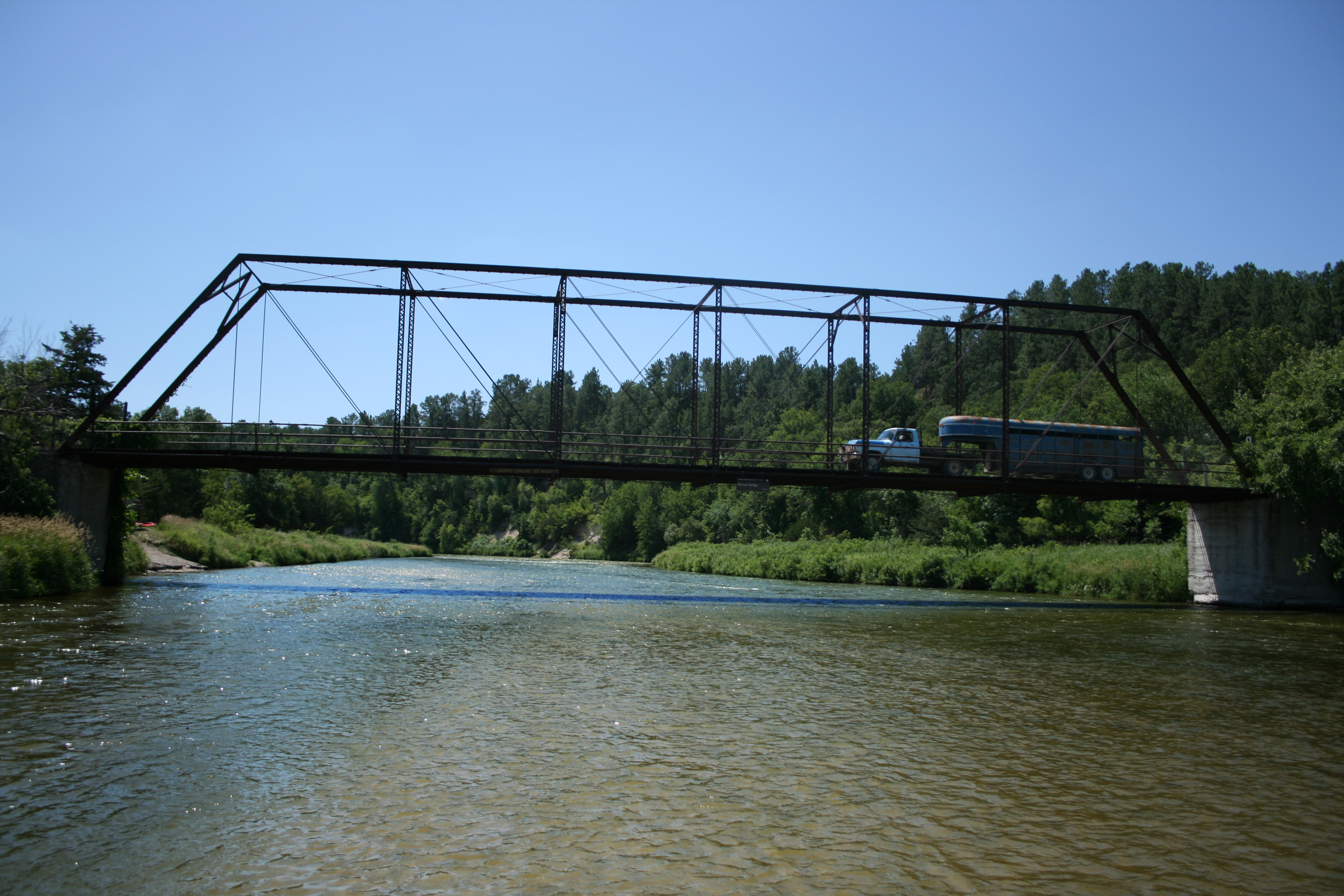

- Location within Nebraska Location within the United States
- Nearest city: Valentine, Nebraska
- Coordinates: 42°52′34″N 100°15′58″W
- Area: less than one acre
- Built: 1899
- Built by: Wrought Iron Bridge Co.; Jones & Laughlin Steel Co.
- Architectural style: Pratt through truss
- MPS: Highway Bridges in Nebraska MPS
- NRHP reference No.: 92000754
- Added to NRHP: June 29, 1992

The Brewer Bridge, near Valentine, Nebraska is a historic Pratt through truss bridge that was built in 1899. It was designed by the Wrought Iron Bridge Co. of Canton, Ohio, was fabricated by the Jones & Laughlin Steel Co., and was built by the Wrought Iron Bridge Co. Also known as the Niobrara River Bridge and denoted NEHBS No. CE00-226, it was listed on the National Register of Historic Places in 1992.

It was built as a replacement of a former "Berry Bridge" in 1899 at contract cost of $4580. It was one of just four Cherry County bridges that survived a flood involving winter ice breakup in 1916. It was moved in 1921 about five miles to the site of the former Brewer Bridge that had been destroyed in that flood. The Berry State Aid Bridge, also NRHP-listed, was built in its place. The move and the new bridge were handled by the Pioneer Construction Company of Omaha.

According to its NRHP nomination, the Brewer Bridge "is technologically significant as the oldest remaining of Cherry County's remarkable group of trusses and one of the oldest remaining vehicular trusses in the state. Although the structure has been moved from its original location, it has functioned in place at its current site for more than 50 years, and has developed a sense of time and place."
