= Bryan Bridge =

- U.S. National Register of Historic Places
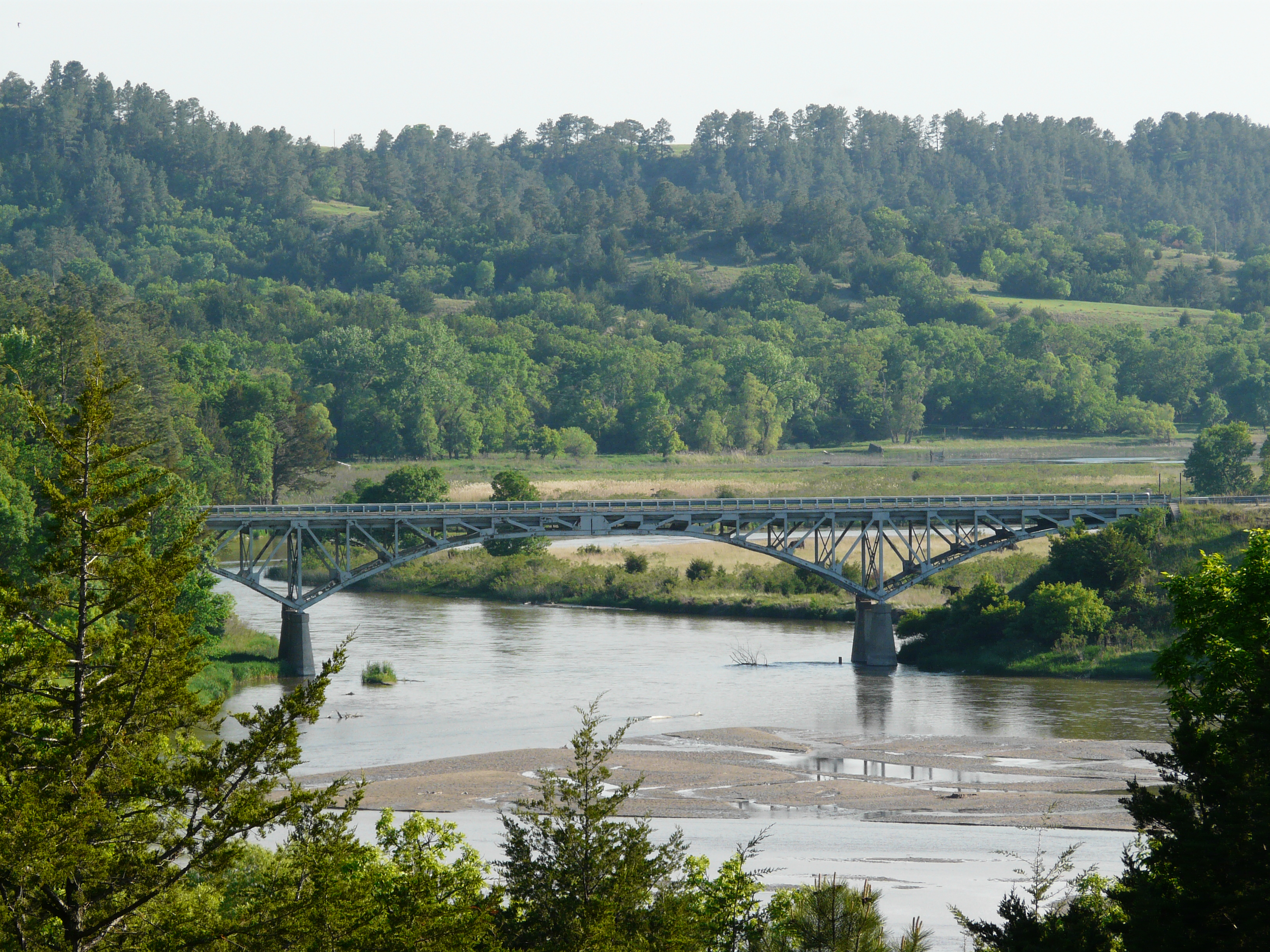

- Location within Nebraska Location within the United States
- Nearest city: Valentine, Nebraska
- Coordinates: 42°49′56″N 100°31′41″W
- Area: less than one acre
- Built: 1932
- Architect: Josef Sorkin, Nebraska Division of Bridge Design
- Architectural style: Pin-connected arch bridge
- NRHP reference No.: 88000912
- Added to NRHP: June 23, 1988

The Bryan Bridge was constructed to carry U.S. Route 20 over the Niobrara River in Cherry County, Nebraska, near Valentine. It was built in 1932 and is a pin-connected arch bridge that is designated "Most Beautiful Steel Bridge" in its year, out of bridges costing less than $250,000, by the American Institute of Steel Construction. It is named after then-sitting Nebraska governor Charles W. Bryan.

According to its NRHP nomination, it is significant "in the area of structural engineering on a state level as an excellent and well-preserved example of a pin-connected cantilever arch bridge. It is the only one of its kind in Nebraska." The NRHP nominator interviewed its designer, Josef Sorkin of the state's Division of Bridge Design, on why he chose this type of design, and reported that he replied "aesthetics, it blended into the surroundings and it was also an economical design for the site." Cantilever arch structures, which have been infrequently used nationwide, were constructed in the mid 1920s to mid 1930s. The cantilever type of truss bridge permitted longer spans and was typically used for spanning major rivers."

National Register designation was given in 1988. It is also designated as NeHBS #CE00-28. In 1995, the bridge was designated as a State Historic Civil Engineering Landmark by the American Society of Civil Engineers.

U.S. Route 20 now crosses the Niobrara River about 2,000 feet (610 m) to the north.
