= York Subway =

Historic bridges in Nebraska, US

- U.S. National Register of Historic Places
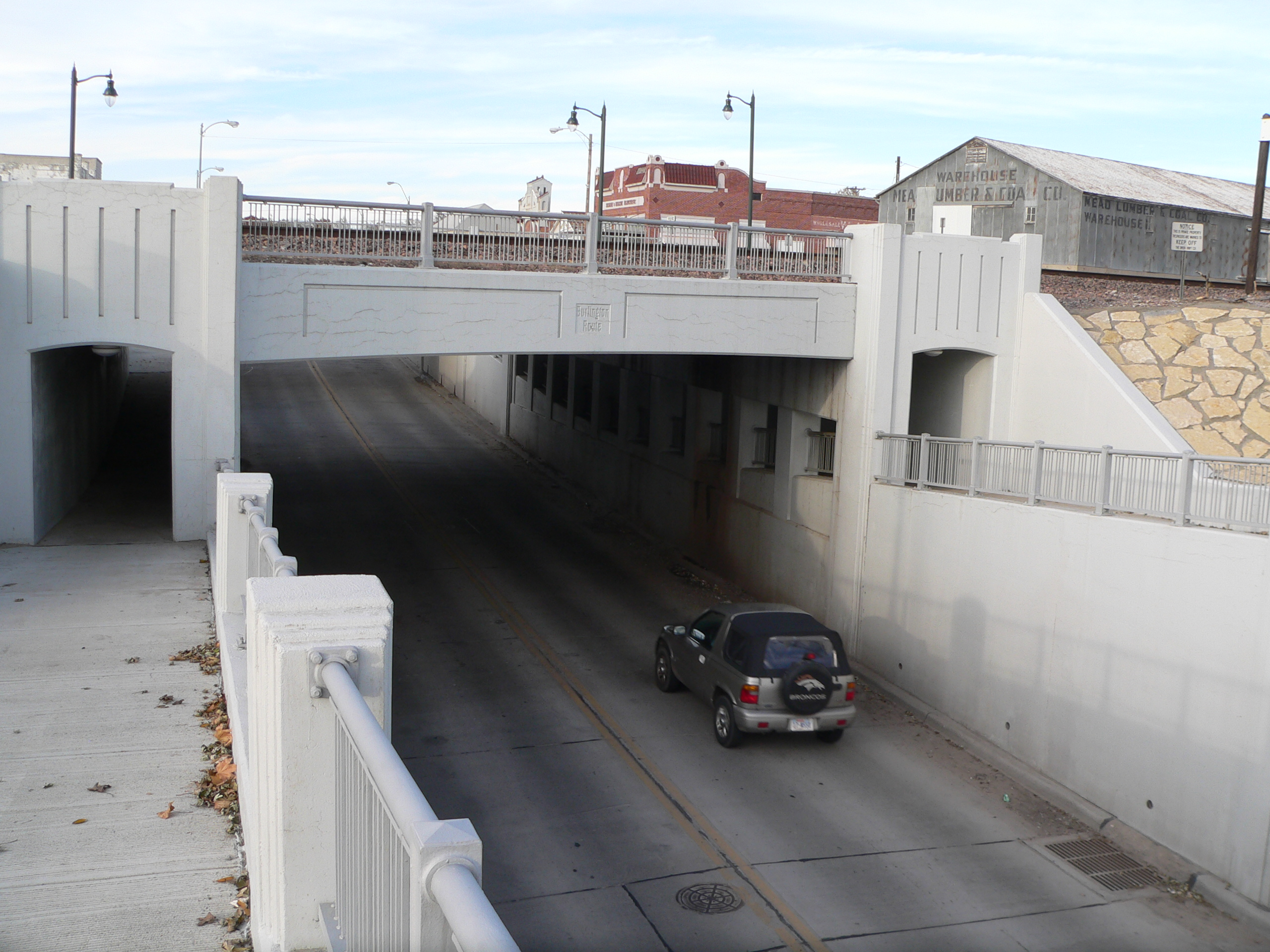

- Location within Nebraska Location within the United States
- Nearest city: York, Nebraska
- Coordinates: 40°52′27″N 97°35′35″W
- Area: less than one acre
- Built: 1938-1939
- Built by: Peter Kiewit's Sons
- MPS: Highway Bridges in Nebraska MPS
- NRHP reference No.: 92000772
- Added to NRHP: June 29, 1992

The York Subway is a set of historic bridges over U.S. Highway 81 in central York, Nebraska. It was constructed between 1938 and 1939 and consists of three concrete bridges carrying 14th and 15th Streets and the tracks of the Chicago, Burlington and Quincy Railroad over the highway. The central railroad bridge carries the stamp "Burlington Route" over the roadway. The project was managed by Nebraska's Bureau of Roads and Bridges who contracted the construction to Peter Kiewit's Sons. It is denoted in the national register as NEHBS No. YK11-51.

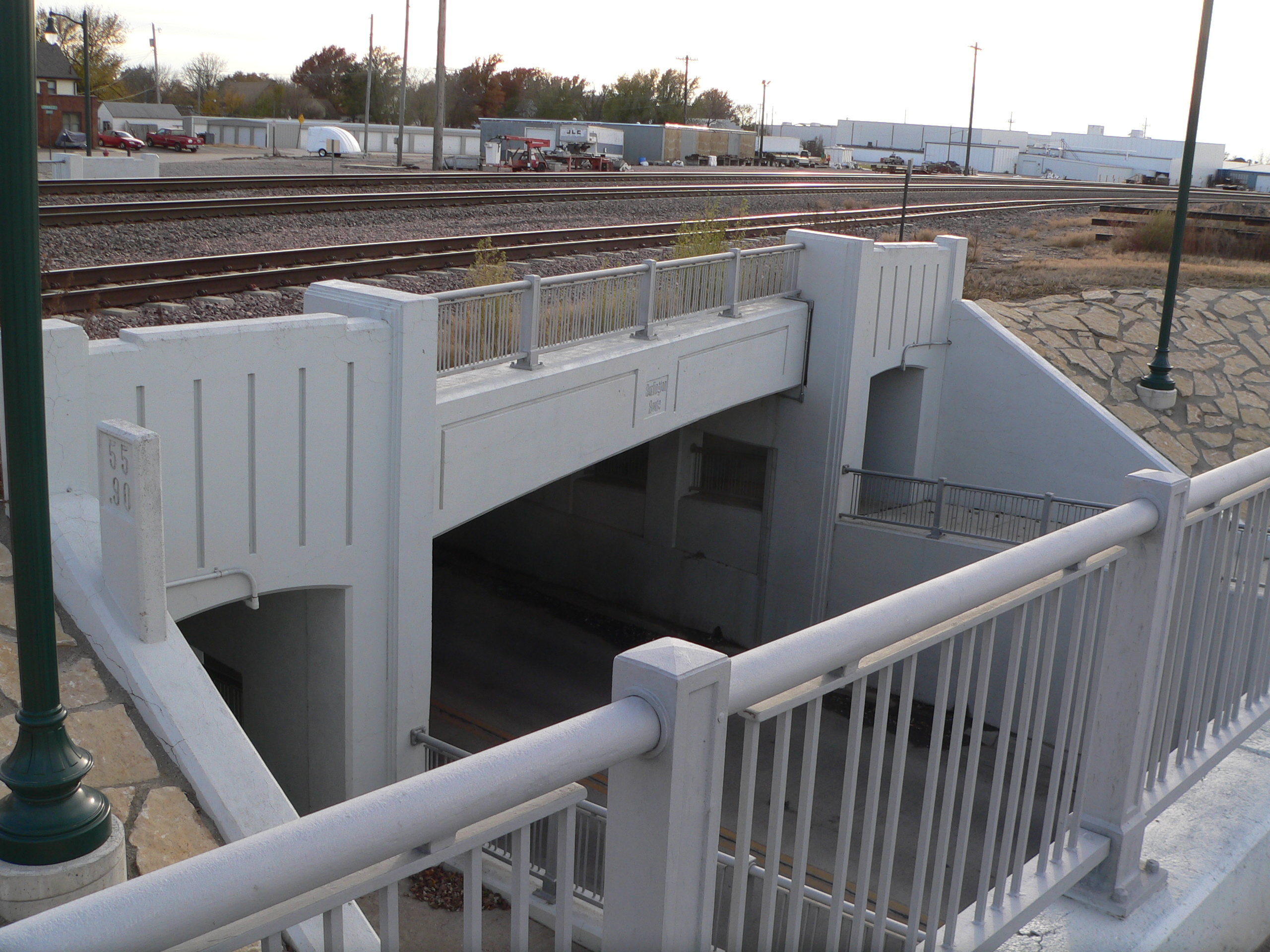

It was listed on the National Register of Historic Places in 1992.
