= Deering Bridge =

Historic place in Nebraska, United States

- U.S. National Register of Historic Places
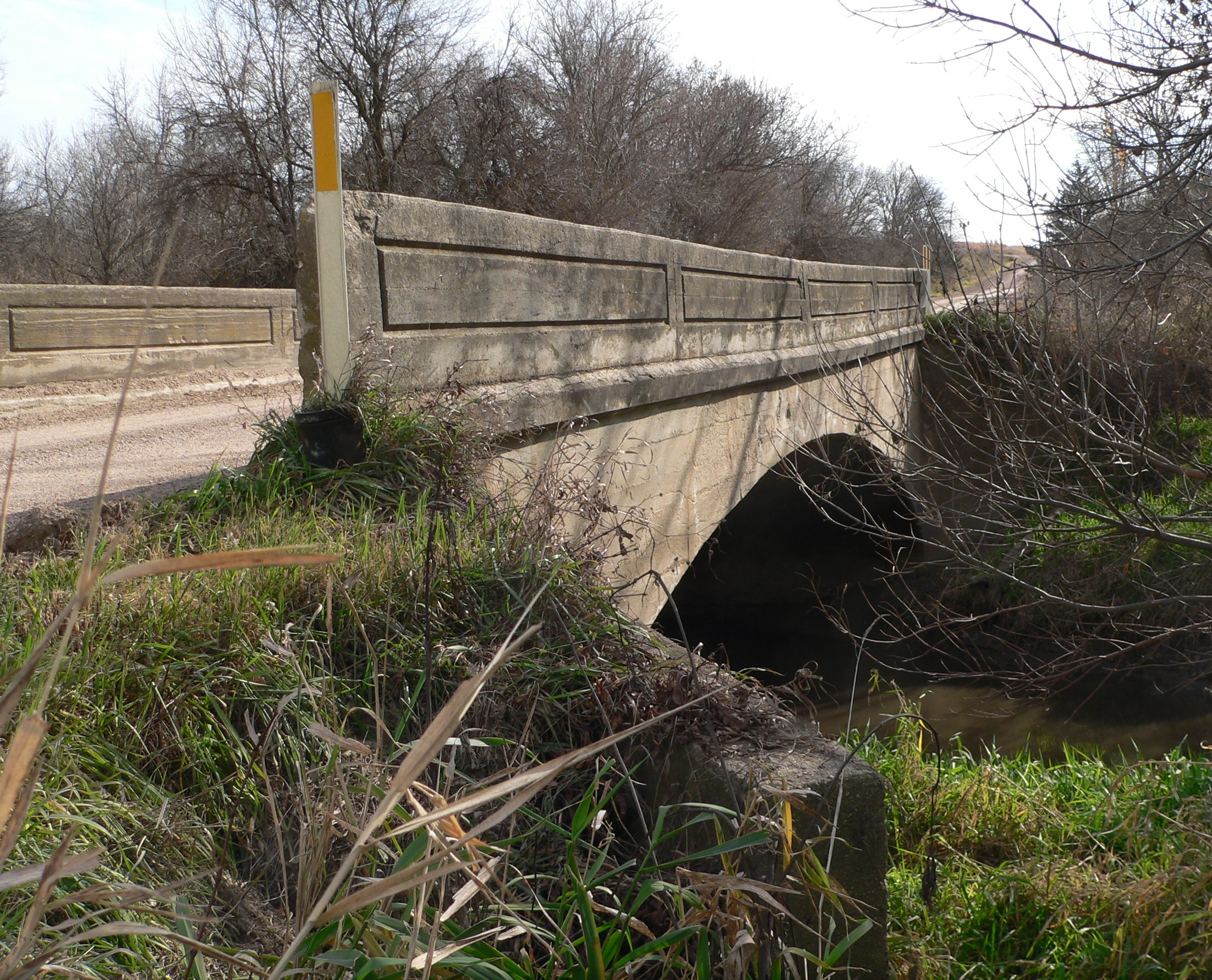

- Location within Nebraska Location within the United States
- Nearest city: Sutton, Nebraska
- Coordinates: 40°38′26″N 97°49′27″W
- Area: less than one acre
- Built: 1916
- Built by: Lincoln Construction Co.
- Architect: Nebraska Bureau of Roads & Bridges
- Architectural style: Concrete spandrel arch
- MPS: Highway Bridges in Nebraska MPS
- NRHP reference No.: 92000748
- Added to NRHP: June 29, 1992

The Deering Bridge, near Sutton, Nebraska, is a historic bridge that was built in 1916. It is a concrete spandrel arch bridge designed by the Nebraska Bureau of Roads & Bridges and built by the Lincoln Construction Co. Also known as School Creek Bridge and as NEHBS No. CY00-11, it was listed on the National Register of Historic Places in 1992.

It is an exemplary 50-foot (15 m) concrete arch bridge, which the Nebraska State Engineer commended as a well-constructed bridge of this type. Prior to the construction of the bridge, Clay County had mainly built wooden and steel bridges; however, after building the Deering Bridge it gradually shifted to constructing concrete bridges. The bridge extends between Clay County and Fillmore County.
