= Berry State Aid Bridge =

- U.S. National Register of Historic Places
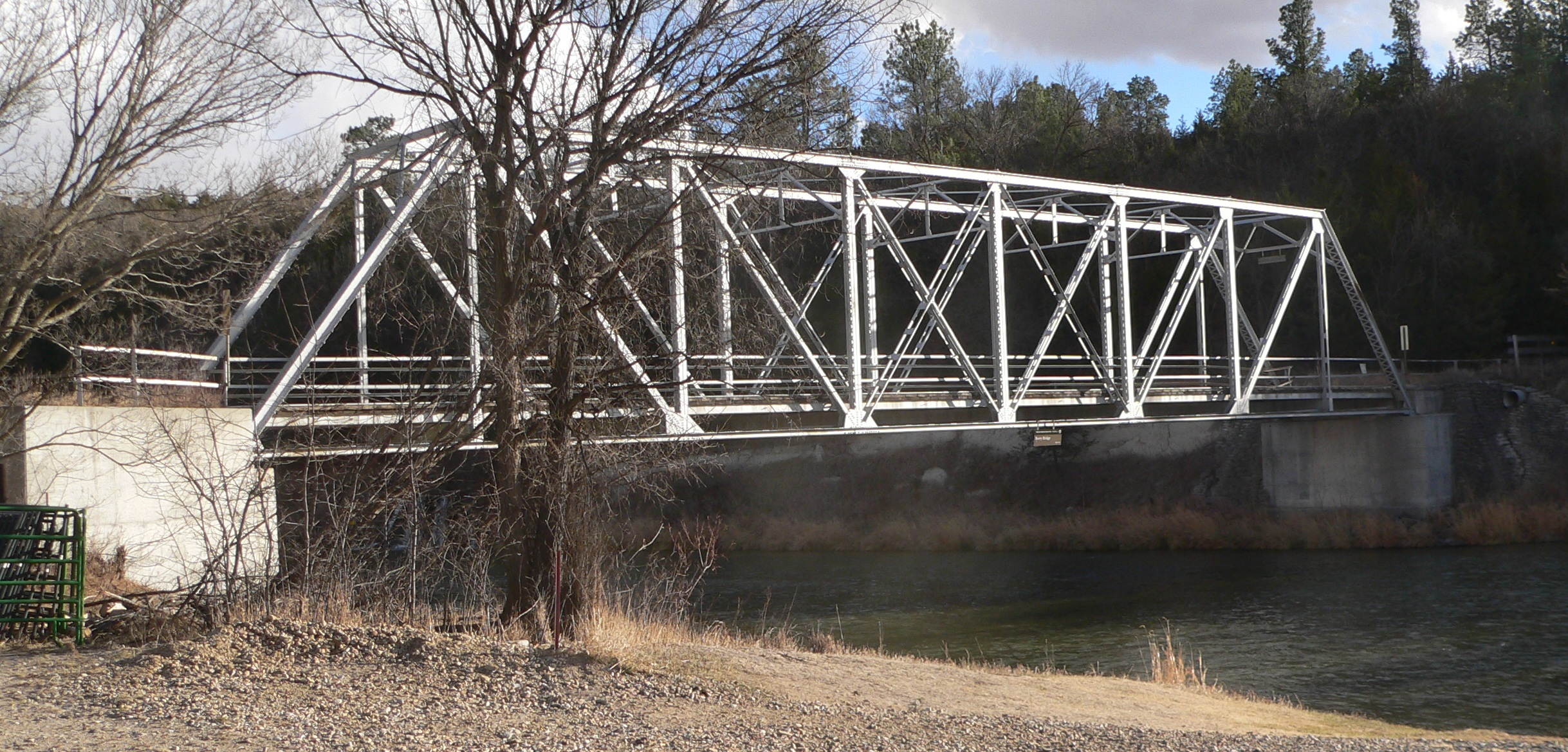

- Location within Nebraska Location within the United States
- Nearest city: Valentine, Nebraska
- Coordinates: 42°54′7″N 100°21′44″W
- Area: less than one acre
- Built: 1920-21
- Architect: Nebraska Bureau of Roads & Bridges; Et al.
- Architectural style: Pratt through truss
- MPS: Highway Bridges in Nebraska MPS
- NRHP reference No.: 92000753
- Added to NRHP: June 29, 1992

The Berry State Aid Bridge spans the Niobrara River in Cherry County, Nebraska near Valentine, Nebraska. It is a historic Pratt through truss bridge that is listed on the National Register of Historic Places.

Also known as the Niobrara River Bridge and identified as NEHBS No. CE00-225, it was built during 1920–21. It was listed on the National Register of Historic Places in 1992.

It replaced an original bridge at the site that was built in 1899, which was moved about five miles to replace another bridge, and which is now also NRHP-listed as Brewer Bridge. During construction of the new Berry State Aid Bridge, a dynamite blast damaged it, but it was completed by June 1921.
