= Nebraska Department of Roads =

Former U.S. state government agency

Nebraska Department of Roads (NDOR)

Agency overview
- Formed: 1957
- Preceding agency: Nebraska Bureau of Roads and Bridges
- Dissolved: June 30, 2017; 9 years ago
- Superseding agency: Nebraska Department of Transportation
- Jurisdiction: State of Nebraska
- Headquarters: 1500 Highway 2 Lincoln, Nebraska
- Parent agency: State of Nebraska

The Nebraska Department of Roads (NDOR) was the state government agency charged with building and maintaining the state and federal highways in the U.S. state of Nebraska from 1957 to 2017. The main headquarters of the agency was located in Lincoln, the capital city. At the time of its dissolution, there were eight NDOR district offices located across the state. Since 2017 the NDOR merged with the Nebraska Department of Aeronautics and is now a part of the Nebraska Department of Transportation.

== History ==
Formed in 1957 from the Bureaus of Roads and of Highway Safety and Patrol within the Nebraska Department of Roads and Irrigation, The Department of Roads was responsible solely for the construction and maintenance of the public highway system in Nebraska, including the initial construction of Nebraska's Interstate System. While originally the department was much like those in other states, NDOR was the last agency of its type in the United States, being a Department of Roads (as opposed to a Department of Transportation).

The Nebraska Department of Roads did not oversee Nebraska aviation, waterways, motor vehicles, or many other areas that similar agencies in other states have as part of their mission. In April 2017, the Nebraska Legislature, on the advice of Governor Pete Ricketts, approved a plan that would combine the Nebraska Department of Roads and the Nebraska Department of Aeronautics into the Nebraska Department of Transportation (NDOT). The Nebraska Department of Roads officially dissolved on June 30, 2017, and the new Department of Transportation began operation the next day.
