= National Register of Historic Places listings in Valley County, Nebraska =

Location of Valley County in Nebraska

Valley County, Nebraska, United States, has seven properties and districts listed on the National Register of Historic Places. Another property was once listed but has been removed.

This National Park Service list is complete through NPS recent listings posted October 30, 2026.

== Current listings ==
	Name on the Register	Image	Date listed	Location	City or town	Description
1	Arcadia Township Carnegie Library		March 13, 2020 (#100005056)	100 South Reynolds St. 41°25′23″N 99°07′31″W	Arcadia	
2	Josef and Anna Beran Bruha House		April 5, 1990 (#90000564)	West of Elyria; 41°39′48″N 99°09′52″W	Burwell	
3	Fort Hartsuff	Fort Hartsuff	March 24, 1978 (#78001716)	North of Elyria; 41°43′23″N 99°01′28″W	Elyria	
4	North Loup Bridge	North Loup Bridge	June 29, 1992 (#92000704)	County road over the North Loup River, 1.5 miles northeast of North Loup; 41°30′37″N 98°45′06″W	North Loup	
5	Rad Slavin cis. 112 Z.C.B.J. Hall	Rad Slavin cis. 112 Z.C.B.J. Hall	November 12, 1992 (#92001569)	Sargent-Ord Rd. 41°36′36″N 99°09′20″W	Comstock	
6	Schultz Site		October 15, 1966 (#66000453)	Address Restricted	North Loup	
7	Valley County Courthouse	Valley County Courthouse	January 10, 1990 (#89002235)	16th St. between L and M Sts. 41°36′09″N 98°55′42″W	Ord	

== Former listing ==
	Name on the Register	Image	Date listed	Date removed	Location	City or town	Description
1	People's Unitarian Church	People's Unitarian Church	June 14, 1984 (#84002497)	July 24, 2017	1640 N St. 41°36′05″N 98°55′48″W	Ord	

== See also ==
- List of National Historic Landmarks in Nebraska
- National Register of Historic Places listings in Nebraska
