= Vinton =

Vinton may refer to:

== Places in the United States ==
- Vinton, California, an unincorporated community
- Fort Vinton, Florida, a military outpost
- Vinton, Iowa, a city
  - Vinton station, a former railroad station on the National Register of Historic Places
- Vinton, Kansas, an unincorporated community
- Vinton, Louisiana, a town
- Vinton, Missouri, a ghost town
- Vinton, Nebraska, a ghost town
- Vinton Township, Nebraska
- Vinton, Ohio, a village
- Vinton County, Ohio
  - Vinton Township, Vinton County, Ohio
- Vinton, Texas, a village
- Vinton, Virginia, a town
- Vinton, West Virginia, a ghost town

== People ==
- Vinton (given name)
- Vinton (surname)

== Other uses ==
- Vinton (album), a 1969 album by Bobby Vinton
- USS Vinton, a United States Navy attack cargo ship
- Vinton Building, Detroit, Michigan, United States, a residential high-rise on the National Register of Historic Places
- Vinton High School, Vinton, Louisiana
- Vinton School, Omaha, Nebraska, United States, an elementary school on the National Register of Historic Places
