= North Loup =

North Loup may refer to:

- North Loup, Nebraska
- North Loup Township, Nebraska

== See also ==
- North Loup River, Nebraska
