= Elyria =

Elyria may refer to:

- Elyria, Ohio, city in Ohio, United States
- Elyria (Amtrak station), Amtrak station in Elyria, Ohio
- Elyria, Kansas, unincorporated community in Kansas, United States
- Elyria, Nebraska, village in Nebraska, United States
- Elyria Township, Valley County, Nebraska
- Elyria Township, Lorain County, Ohio
- Elyria (album), 1994 album by Faith and the Muse
