= Sumter =

Sumter may refer to:

== People ==
=== Given name ===
- Sumter S. Arnim (1904–1990), American dentist
- Sumter de Leon Lowry Jr. (1893–1985), United States Army general

=== Surname ===
- Rowendy Sumter (born 1988), Curaçaoan footballer
- Shavonda E. Sumter (born 1974), American politician
- Thomas Sumter (1734–1832), brigadier general during the American War of Independence
- Thomas De Lage Sumter (1809–1874), American politician

== Places ==
- Fort Sumter, location of the first shots of the United States Civil War
- Sumter, Georgia
- Sumter, Nebraska
- Sumter, South Carolina
- Sumter National Forest
- Sumter County, Alabama
- Sumter County, Florida
- Sumter County, Georgia
- Sumter County, South Carolina
- Sumter Township, McLeod County, Minnesota

== Ships ==
- CSS Sumter a Confederate Navy vessel in the American Civil War
- USS Sumter (1862), the former CSS General Sumter, a cottonclad ram captured in 1862
- USS Sumter (APA-52) (previously AP-97), an attack transport; formerly Iberville
- USS Sumter (LST-1181), a tank landing ship
- Sumter-class attack transport

== Events ==
- Battle of Fort Sumter, 1861 American Civil War battle.

== See also ==
- Sumpter (disambiguation)
