= Vinton Township =

Vinton Township may refer to one of the following places in the United States:

- Vinton Township, Valley County, Nebraska, one of fifteen townships in Valley County, Nebraska, United States
- Vinton Township, Vinton County, Ohio, one of the twelve townships of Vinton County, Ohio, United States

See also

- Vinton (disambiguation)
