= List of National Historic Landmarks in Nebraska =

Nebraska National Historic Landmarks (clickable map)

The List of National Historic Landmarks in Nebraska contains the landmarks designated by the U.S. Federal Government for the U.S. state of Nebraska. There are 23 National Historic Landmarks (NHLs) in Nebraska.

== Key ==
| | National Historic Landmark |
| ^{†} | National Historic Landmark District |
| ^{#} | National Historic Site, National Historical Park, National Memorial, or National Monument |
| ^{*} | Delisted Landmark |

== Current NHLs in Nebraska ==
Nebraska's National Historic Landmarks are distributed across 18 of Nebraska's 93 counties.

| | Landmark name | Image | Date designated | Location | County | Description |
|---|---|---|---|---|---|---|
| 1 | Ash Hollow Cave | Ash Hollow Cave | July 19, 1964 (#66000445) | Lewellen; 41°17′53″N 102°07′12″W | Garden | Included in Ash Hollow Historic District |
| 2 | William Jennings Bryan House | William Jennings Bryan House | November 6, 1963 (#66000947) | Lincoln; 40°47′45″N 96°39′06″W | Lancaster | The home of William Jennings Bryan. |
| 3 | Captain Meriwether Lewis (dustpan dredge) | Captain Meriwether Lewis (dustpan dredge) | April 11, 1989 (#77000833) | Brownville; 40°23′31″N 95°39′02″W | Nemaha | |
| 4 | Willa Cather House | Willa Cather House | November 11, 1971 (#69000139) | Red Cloud; 40°05′16″N 98°31′16″W | Webster | Author Willa Cather's childhood home |
| 5 | Coufal Site | | July 19, 1964 (#66000446) | Cotesfield | Howard | An archaeological site. |
| 6^{†} | Father Flanagan's Boys' Home | Father Flanagan's Boys' Home | February 4, 1985 (#85002439) | Boys Town; 41°15′52″N 96°07′58″W | Douglas | Site of Father Flanagan's original boy's home |
| 7 | Fort Atkinson | Fort Atkinson | July 4, 1961 (#66000454) | Fort Calhoun; 41°27′08″N 96°00′45″W | Washington | Site of the original Council Bluff |
| 8^{†} | Fort Robinson and Red Cloud Agency | Fort Robinson and Red Cloud Agency | December 19, 1960 (#66000442) | Crawford; 42°40′08″N 103°28′02″W | Dawes and Sioux | Site of an Indian Wars-era U.S. Army post. |
| 9 | USS Hazard (minesweeper) | USS Hazard (minesweeper) | January 14, 1986 (#79003712) | Omaha; 41°16′28″N 95°54′05″W | Douglas | A ship located in Omaha's Freedom Park. |
| 9 | Kregel Windmill Company Factory | Kregel Windmill Company Factory | December 13, 2024 (#100011369) | 1416 Central Ave. 40°40′37″N 95°51′49″W | Otoe | Now the Kregel Windmill Factory Museum. |
| 10 | Leary Site | Leary Site | July 19, 1964 (#66000449) | Rulo; 40°00′06″N 95°23′42″W | Richardson | An archaeological site. |
| 11 | J. Sterling Morton House | J. Sterling Morton House | May 15, 1975 (#69000135) | Nebraska City; 40°40′50″N 95°52′54″W | Otoe | The home J. Sterling Morton and the National Arbor Day Foundation. |
| 12 | Nebraska State Capitol | Nebraska State Capitol | January 7, 1976 (#70000372) | Lincoln; 40°48′33″N 96°42′02″W | Lancaster | The seat of the Government of Nebraska. |
| 13 | George W. Norris House | George W. Norris House | May 28, 1967 (#67000006) | McCook; 40°12′14″N 100°37′33″W | Red Willow | Home of U.S. Senator George W. Norris. |
| 14 | Omaha Union Station | Omaha Union Station | December 23, 2016 (#100000870) | Omaha; 41°15′06″N 95°55′42″W | Douglas | |
| 15 | Palmer Site | Palmer Site | July 19, 1964 (#66000447) | Palmer | Howard and Merrick | An archaeological site. |
| 16 | Dr. Susan LaFlesche Picotte Memorial Hospital | Dr. Susan LaFlesche Picotte Memorial Hospital | April 19, 1993 (#88002762) | Walthill; 42°09′06″N 96°30′22″W | Thurston | Hospital founded by Susan La Flesche Picotte, the first American Indian physician and one of the first female physicians in the U.S. |
| 17 | Pike Pawnee Village Site | Pike Pawnee Village Site | July 19, 1964 (#66000455) | Guide Rock; 40°04′29″N 98°19′50″W | Webster | Claimed for the U.S. by Captain Zebulon Pike during the Pike Expedition in 1806. |
| 18 | Robidoux Pass | Robidoux Pass | January 20, 1961 (#66000450) | Gering; 41°48′54″N 103°51′14″W | Scotts Bluff | Pass that was part of the Oregon Trail from 1848 to 1851, when another pass became preferred. |
| 19 | Schultz Site | | July 19, 1964 (#66000453) | North Loup | Valley | An archaeological site. |
| 20 | Scout's Rest Ranch | Scout's Rest Ranch | January 13, 2021 (#100006250) | Northwest of North Platte off U.S. Route 30; 41°09′48″N 100°47′42″W | Lincoln | |
| 21 | Signal Butte | Signal Butte | January 20, 1961 (#66000452) | Gering; 41°47′50″N 103°54′24″W | Scotts Bluff | |
| 22 | Walker Gilmore Site | | July 19, 1964 (#66000441) | Murray; 40°53′59″N 95°50′14″W | Cass | An archaeological site. |

== Historic areas of the National Park System in Nebraska ==
National Monuments, National Historic Sites, and certain other areas listed in the National Park system are historic landmarks of national importance that are highly protected already, often before the inauguration of the NHL program in 1960, and are then often not also named NHLs per se. There are two of these in Nebraska. The National Park Service lists these two together with the NHLs in the state, They are

| | Landmark name | Image | Date established | Location | County | Description |
|---|---|---|---|---|---|---|
| 1 | Homestead National Historical Park | | March 19, 1936 | Beatrice | Gage | The first claim made under the Homestead Act of 1862. |
| 2 | Scotts Bluff National Monument | | December 12, 1919 | Gering | Scotts Bluff | A landmark on the Oregon and Mormon Trails. |

== See also ==
- National Register of Historic Places listings in Nebraska
- List of National Historic Landmarks by state
- List of National Natural Landmarks in Nebraska
- Landmarks in Omaha, Nebraska
