= Mary Burger =

American barrel racer (born 1948)

- Birth name: Mary Lichtle
- Occupation: Rodeo competitor
- Discipline: Barrel racing
- Born: August 18, 1948 (age 78); Decatur, Indiana, United States
- Major wins/Championships: 2 WPRA barrel racing world championships
- Lifetime achievements: Oldest rodeo world champion

Honors
- 2017 National Cowgirl Museum and Hall of Fame; 2026 ProRodeo Hall of Fame

Significant horses
- Fred (Rare Fred); Mo (SadieFamousLastWords); Sailor (Sailors Wind)

Mary Burger (née Lichtle; born August 18, 1948) is an American former professional rodeo cowgirl who specialized in barrel racing. She has won two Women's Professional Rodeo Association (WPRA) barrel racing world championships in 2006 and 2016. Burger was 68 years old when she won the championship in 2016, setting a new record for oldest professional rodeo world champion in any rodeo event, male or female. She broke the existing record set by Ike Rude of 59 years old in steer roping set in 1953. She also broke the record set by Mary Walker in 2012 at 53 years old. Also In 2016, she became the third WPRA barrel racer to wear the No. 1 back number at the National Finals Rodeo (NFR). She set a new record for season earnings, and she set a new record by becoming the oldest WPRA qualifier to the NFR at 68 years old. Her horses, Mo and Fred, whom she used to win her titles with, she trained in barrel racing herself.

== Early life ==
Mary Burger was born Mary Lichtle in Decatur, Indiana, on August 18, 1948. Burger is one of three girls and three boys born to the Lichtles. She grew up riding horses. As a young girl, she was diagnosed with Legg–Calvé–Perthes disease, a rare childhood hip disorder. Her condition made walking difficult. As a result, her father bought her a pony, and she took to riding agilely. She attended every 4-H horse show near her home that she could. After she outgrew 4-H shows, she competed in American Quarter Horse Association (AQHA) shows. She mastered this sport, winning 9 championships. During this time, she met and married her husband Kerry Burger, an esteemed farrier. They have two sons, Todd and Joey. In the 1980s, the family moved to Pauls Valley, Oklahoma. Through training horses, she encountered some winners on the futurity horse race circuit. Soon, she was competing in amateur rodeos. She first started competing professionally in barrel racing in 1984.

== Career ==
As an amateur, Burger competed in the AQHA in barrel racing, and won world championships in 1974, 1985, 1986, 1995, 2001, 2002, 2003, and 2005. She also competed in pole bending, and won one world championship title in 1974.

Burger turned professional by joining the WPRA in 1985. Barrel racing is sanctioned by the WPRA, while other rodeo events are sanctioned by the PRCA. The barrel racing events, however, take place at PRCA rodeos, alongside events such as bull riding and tie-down roping. All of the championship rodeo events are held together except steer roping which has its own finals event, the National Finals Steer Roping (NFSR), at the National Finals Rodeo (NFR) in December. When Burger and her daughter-in-law, P.J., qualified together for the NFR in 2009, they became the first mother-in-law and daughter-in-law duo to achieve that feat.

=== Seasons 1985 through 2005 ===
Although Burger turned professional in 1985, she only went to rodeos in her local area until the early 2000s. In fact, in 1987, she won her regional National Circuit Finals Rodeo (NCFR) and became the Prairie Circuit Finals champion. Burger went to quite a few rodeos in 2004 and 2005, but only regional ones. It was in the year 2006 when she expanded out to rodeos throughout the country. She won her first world championship title that year. She achieved this after placing in 9 of 10 rounds at the NFR.

=== Season 2006 ===
Her third qualification to the NFR brought Burger her first barrel racing world championship. She and her horse, Fred, placed in nine out of ten rounds. She finished the year with total earnings of $189,185, and $78,588 of those earnings was won at the NFR. Burger won the Tulsa State Fair Rodeo, Tulsa, Oklahoma; the Inter-State Fair and Rodeo, Coffeyville, Kansas; the Wahoo Rodeo, Wahoo, Nebraska; the Toppenish Pow Wow and Rodeo, Toppenish, Washington; the Eugene Pro Rodeo, Eugene, Oregon; the Pace Picante ProRodeo Chute-Out, Tulsa, Oklahoma; and was co-champion at the Old Fort Days Rodeo in Fort Smith, Arkansas.

=== Season 2007 ===
In 2007, an injury to her horse, Fred, about seven months after her 2006 world championship kept her from defending it. They competed at rodeos at Reno, Nevada, St. Paul, Oregon, and Molalla, Oregon, earning $22,126 and qualifying Burger for her second NFR. In Las Vegas, the pair hit two barrels in the first two rounds. They ended the season fifth in the average. She finished the year ranked 30th in the world standings with earnings of $26,144.

=== Season 2008 ===
In 2008, Burger finished ranked seventh in the world standings with earnings of $116,518. She finished fifth in the NFR Average and won a total of $30,018 in NFR earnings. She placed in 3 out of 10 rounds at the NFR. She won in her local circuit, the NCFR Prairie Circuit Finals championship, and the NCFR Average title. She won the Longford Rodeo, Longford, Kansas; the Will Rogers Memorial Rodeo, Vinita, Oklahoma; Athens Mda Benefit Rodeo, Athens, Texas; 101 Wild West Rodeo, Ponca City, Oklahoma; Kansas Biggest Rodeo, Philiipsburg, Kansas; Days of '47 Rodeo, Salt Lake City, Utah; the Laramie Jubilee Days Rodeo, Laramie, Wyoming; Molalla Buckeroo, Molalla, Oregon; St. Paul Rodeo, St. Paul, Oregon; the Reno Rodeo, Reno, Nevada; the Crosstie Rodeo, Hinton, Oklahoma; the Will Rogers Stampede, Claremore, Oklahoma; the Abdallah Shrine Rodeo & Demo Derby, Tonganoxie, Kansas; the Butterfield Stage Days Rodeo, Bridgeport, Texas; and the Walker County Fair and Rodeo, Huntsville, Texas. She was also the co-champion at the Angelina County Benefit Rodeo in Lufkin, Texas.

=== Season 2009 ===
In the 2009 season, she entered the NFR ranked third in the world standings, but finished fourth with earnings of $156,153. She placed in three of the ten rounds. She won in her local circuit, the NCFR Prairie Circuit Finals championship and the NCFR Average title. She won the Longford Rodeo, Longford, Kansas; the Freedom Rodeo and Old Cowhands Reunion, Freedom, Oklahoma; the Dodge City Roundup Rodeo, Dodge City, Kansas; the Eugene Pro Rodeo, Eugene, Oregon; the Bennington Rodeo, Bennington, Kansas; the Crockett Lions Club Rodeo, Crockett, Texas; and the RodeoHouston at the Houston Livestock Show and Rodeo in Houston, Texas. She was also the co-champion at the Young County Rodeo in Graham, Texas.

=== Seasons 2010–2015 ===
In the 2010 season, Fred's owner Ron Martin became obligated to sell the horse, leaving Burger without a ride. In the 2011 season, she finished 33rd in the world standings with $35,385 in earnings. She won the Scotts Bluff County Fair and Rodeo in Mitchell, Nebraska, and the Hugo Pro Rodeo in Hugo, Oklahoma. In the 2012 season, she finished 161st in the world standings with $5,347 in earnings. In the 2013 season, she finished 337th in the world standings with $2,166 in earnings. Also in this season, Burger and Mo competed in the WPRA Futurity Division. They earned 154 points and earned $22,283. In the 2014 season, she finished 84th in the world standings with $12,029 in earnings. Mary and Mo finished the 2015 season ranked 77th in the world standings, not high enough to get into many of the big rodeos. She earned $17,641 in the 2015 season.

=== Season 2016 ===
Burger had 39 rodeos and almost $100,000 in earnings this year prior to attending the Calgary Stampede in March. Burger and Mo got into RodeoHouston and the Calgary Stampede this season and won them both. In fact, she won the maximum amount of money available to any given contestant at Calgary, $122,000, of which $72,000 counted towards the World Standings.

==== RodeoHouston ====
On Saturday, March 19, at the Houston Livestock Show and Rodeo in Houston, Texas at NRG Stadium, Burger competed so well in the Super Series she won her second title there with a 14.15-second run on Mo. Burger said it was her main goal this year just to get to this rodeo "RodeoHouston has always been one of my favorite rodeos," Burger said. "It's the prestige and the money, and I just feel like I'm on cloud nine." She won $54,750 total for the entire competition. She won her first title here back in 2009.

==== Calgary Stampede ====
For three days in a row of competition at the Stampede, the 67-year-old Burger had taken the top prize in the barrel racing competition, winning herself a total of $16,500 and a spot at the finals. On Sunday, March 20, Burger and her horse Mo ran the barrels in the finals at the Calgary Stampede. Despite the mud, they completed the course in 17.99 seconds to win the six-digit grand prize. Burger claims she knew it was going to rain before they even got to Calgary, Alberta, Canada, and she had run him in the mud beforehand a few times to prepare him. She took home a check for $100,000 that weekend, her largest prize ever. She became the oldest winner of the grand prize. She said that when she came through the alleyway and the audience started cheering, she thought, "I hope this turns out." When she won the finals on Sunday, she got a standing ovation.

Burger won against other barrel racing notables like Mary Walker, Lisa Lockhart, and Jackie Ganter in the Championship Round around to win the grand prize. She had qualified for the Stampede through her showing at RodeoHouston. For the remainder of 2016, Burger and Mo were assured of qualifying for the NFR for 2016. Of Burger's $122,000 total Stampede payout this weekend, $72,000 of it counts in her WPRA standings. The 67 year old barrel racer was constantly told by her fans that she is an inspiration to them due to her age.

On Friday, July 28, at Cheyenne Frontier Days, in Cheyenne, Wyoming, at the Cinch Shootout Rodeo, Burger and her horse Mo, competed at Frontier Park and won the barrel racing event. There were eight contestants including Burger. In the first round, Burger had the fastest round of the day at 17.047 seconds. The top three advanced to the final round. Burger and Mo also won that round with a time of 17.114 seconds which garnered them the $10,000 prize. Burger was quick to credit Mo, but it was really her training as well as the horse.

==== 2016 NFR ====
Burger entered into her fourth NFR as No. 1 in the World Standings. Burger was leading with the most money ever won by a barrel racer in the regular season. However, enough money can be won at the NFR that even the competitor in 15th place has a shot to win. Amberleigh Moore was in 15th coming into the NFR and left in second place. Competition at the NFR is between the top 15 competitors in the world standings.

When Burger and Mo tipped a barrel in the 10th Round on the final day, they left the door open for three other competitors: Moore, Sherry Cervi, and Lisa Lockhart. However, none of three stepped up. Lockhart won the Average, Cervi won her first round of the rodeo, and Moore won second in the Average. Moore placed in eight of ten go-rounds winning $180,000 in NFR earnings. She gave Burger a major run for gold with three go-round victories, including an arena record tying run of 13.37 seconds in Round 8. She managed to take second place from the last spot of 15th.

Through 10 rounds of competition in 10 days, she remained in that position. Since on the 10th day in the Championship round she and Mo tipped a barrel, Burger had no idea what the final standings, she was clueless that she had won, so she went to the barn to unsaddle Mo. They had to send someone after her to inform her she had won and to bring her back to the arena.

Burger placed in five rounds at the NFR. She finished sixth in the Average. She slid by reserve world champion Amberleigh Moore by less than $11,000, which would typically be "a fourth-place check in any go-round" in Las Vegas. Burger's performance at the NFR plus her large season winnings, namely $50,000 from RodeoHouston and the $72,000 of her Calgary Stampede winnings that counted, brought her the success in a very close race. Even with Mo having a soft tissue injury, the horse came through for her as his vet was at the event and monitoring him every day. Mo was recognized when he was named the runner-up to AQHA/WPRA Horse of the Year CFour Tibbie Sinson. Mo was also named the Scoti Flit Bar Rising Star Award which was awarded on December 1 prior to the first performance. She gives credit for winning to Mo and her supportive family.

She won $86,577 total in winnings at the NFR. Her total winnings season and NFR combined were $277,554 which were the most of any barrel racer that year which made her the WPRA World Barrel Racing Champion. This was her second champion title at the age of 68. Following this historic season, Burger officially retired from barrel racing.

=== Records set ===
==== Oldest world champion ====
In 2016, Burger won her second barrel racing world championship title at the NFR and set a record for being the oldest world champion in the WPRA and the PRCA at 68 years, 4 months old. The record holder at that time was still 59-year-old Ike Rude, who won the steer roping championship in 1953.

==== Oldest NFR qualifier ====
Burger set a new record in 2016 by becoming the oldest WPRA qualifier to the NFR at 68 years, 4 months old. She broke the record set by June Holeman in 2005 who was 62-years old.

==== Back No. 1 ====
The rodeo contestant with the highest season earnings is honored with wearing the No. 1 back number at the NFR. The year 2016 is only the third time since 1967, when barrel racing was added as an event to the NFR, that a WPRA barrel racer has achieved this feat. At the end of September, when Burger realized she had a good chance to win the back number, she decided that she would go to more rodeos to try to win it. She had been planning to skip some rodeos at that time. In 2016, Burger became the third WPRA member to wear the coveted No. 1 back number in NFR history. Charmayne James was first in 1987. Sherry Cervi was second in 1995.

==== Most money won in the regular season (Prior to the NFR) ====
As of August 8, 2018, Burger's regular season earnings eclipsed the record set by Lindsay Sears set in 2008, whose earnings were $184,567. She set the new record with a bit more than two months left before the regular season ended on September 30. In fact, she and her horse, Mo, won more money than any other competitor in the PRCA or the WPRA in the 2016 season. She was leading the race for the No. 1 back number by almost $30,000. Her 2016 winnings of $187,527 nearing the end, were almost $30,000 over saddle bronc rider Jacobs Crawley. On August 8, 2016, Burger set a new earnings record for the regular season by earning $190,977.

=== Season summary ===
Burger headed into the NFR with a lead of $74,590. Burger set the new season earnings record by earning $190,977 for the 2016 season. Winning RodeoHouston and the Calgary Stampede were big contributors to that record. She set several new records in the WPRA and the PRCA. She claimed multiple rodeo wins this year, some notable ones include: Hugo Pro Rodeo Hugo, Oklahoma; Flint Hills Rodeo, Strong City, Kansas; Frontier Hills Rodeo, Abbyville, Kansas; Wichita Falls Rodeo; Wichita Falls, Texas; San Patricio County Rodeo & Dance, Sinton, Texas, and the Card Holder race at the 2015 WPRA World Finals in Waco, Texas, where the money counts towards the 2016 standings.

== Career summary ==
As an amateur, in 1974 she holds one AQHA world championship title. As of the end of 2016, Burger had $950,785 in career earnings. She had $277,554 in earnings for the entire year of 2016, including NFR earnings. Her total NFR earnings totalled $86,577. She ended the year 1st in the WPRA World Standings. She was 8th in the NFR Standings. She holds two barrel racing world championship titles in 2006 and 2016. She qualified for the NFR four times (2006, 2008, 2009, and 2016). She qualified for the RNCFR four times (2005, 2009, 2010, 2015). In 1987, 2008, and 2009, she holds the title as the NCFR Prairie Circuit Finals Champion. She set a record for oldest professional rodeo world champion, most season earnings, and oldest NFR qualifier. She became the third WPRA competitor to wear Back No. 1 at the NFR. In 2017, she was inducted into the National Cowgirl Museum and Hall of Fame.

== Award winning horses ==
The horse who Burger won her first World Barrel Racing Champion title on in 2006 was a sorrel gelding whose registered name is Rare Fred, nicknamed Fred, and he was 12 years old at the time of her world championship in 2006. Mary trained and rode Fred, but he was owned by Ron Martin of Seal Beach, California. Rare Fred was the AQHA/WPRA Barrel Racing Horse of the Year in 2006 and 2009. Fred, who is by Jet Radar, has a notable pedigree. The stallion is double-bred Jet Deck-on the top through the Depth Charge/Go Man Go-bred Rare Jet. On the bottom, he is through Easy Jet and mixed with a Lady Bugs Moon daughter. Fred's dam is Sleek Glass, who is a granddam of both Secretariat and Johnny Dial. In 2010, Burger's rodeo season was disrupted when Fred's owner, Ron Martin, was obligated to sell him to another party.

The horse who Burger won her second World Barrel Racing Champion title in 2016 on was a buckskin gelding whose registered name is SadiesFamousLastWords, nicknamed Mo. Mo's sire is Sadies Frost Drift. His dam is Porky and Bess. When Burger saw Mo, she recognized his talent and made an open trade for him with Brad Leiblong, a futurity trainer and horse trader. Mo was 2 years old when she found him, and she quickly traded for him with the registration papers coming straight to her.

Burger was 62 and very busy, so she sent Mo out for 30 days of initial training. However, all of his remaining training has been done by Burger herself. Burger and Mo have some notable wins at some large rodeos such as the Houston Livestock Show and Rodeo and the Calgary Stampede, for example, when he was 7 years of age. "The sky is the limit with him," Burger said. "As an eight or nine-year-old, he should be a little more solid and more mature. He started running even harder last spring and summer. I don't think he even knew that he could run harder. He just covers the ground so easily." Mo finished second to the AQHA/WPRA Barrel Racing Horse of the Year CFour Tibbie Stinson in 2016. Mo also won the Scoti Flit Bar Rising Star Award in 2016.

One of her earlier horses was by the registered name of Sailors Wind, nicknamed Sailor, a 15-year-old gelding, whose sire's name is Dashin Is Easy. His dam's name is Runaway N Passem.

== Personal life ==
Mary Burger's husband Kerry died in 2023. Burger still lives in Pauls Valley, Oklahoma, where she trains horses for futurity racing. She lives on 28 acres. The family also own a B&B Machine Shop near by. Her son Joey is married to P.J. Burger, who was Mary's traveling partner. Joey and P.J. have a daughter who competes in the National Little Britches Rodeo Association. Burger's favorite rodeos are the Woodward Elks Rodeo in Woodward, Oklahoma, and the Houston Livestock Show and Rodeo in Houston, Texas. Burger trained her barrel horses, such as Fred and Mo, with a pole bending pattern and without any arena fences. "I want them automatic," she said. "I want them using that inside back leg and for it all to be very fluid, And I go with them. It's not just 'drag and pull.'"

== Honors ==
In 2017, Mary Burger was inducted into the National Cowgirl Museum and Hall of Fame.

In 2026, she was inducted into the ProRodeo Hall of Fame.

== Bibliography ==
- 2021 WPRA NFR Media Guide | Barrel Racing World Champions 1948 - 2020. Women's Professional Rodeo Association. Archived from the original on April 12, 2022.
- 2017 Media Guide | Barrel Racing Records (PDF). Women's Professional Rodeo Association.
- PRCA Awards (PDF). Professional Rodeo Cowboys Association. 2021.
- Wrangler NFR (PDF). Professional Rodeo Cowboys Association. 2019.
