= Arcadia Township, Valley County, Nebraska =

Arcadia Township
- Township
- Location in Valley County
- Coordinates: 41°26′16″N 099°09′16″W
- Country: United States
- State: Nebraska
- County: Valley

Area
  - Total: 35.9 sq mi (92.9 km^{2})
  - Land: 35.85 sq mi (92.86 km^{2})
  - Water: 0.015 sq mi (0.04 km^{2}) 0.04%
- Elevation: 2,162 ft (659 m)

Population (2020)
  - Total: 382
  - Density: 10.7/sq mi (4.11/km^{2})
- GNIS feature ID: 0837857

Arcadia Township is one of fifteen townships in Valley County, Nebraska, United States. The population was 382 at the 2020 census. A 2021 estimate placed the township's population at 384.

The Village of Arcadia lies within the Township.

== See also ==
- County government in Nebraska
