= Tea with pine nuts =

Traditional Tunisian cuisine

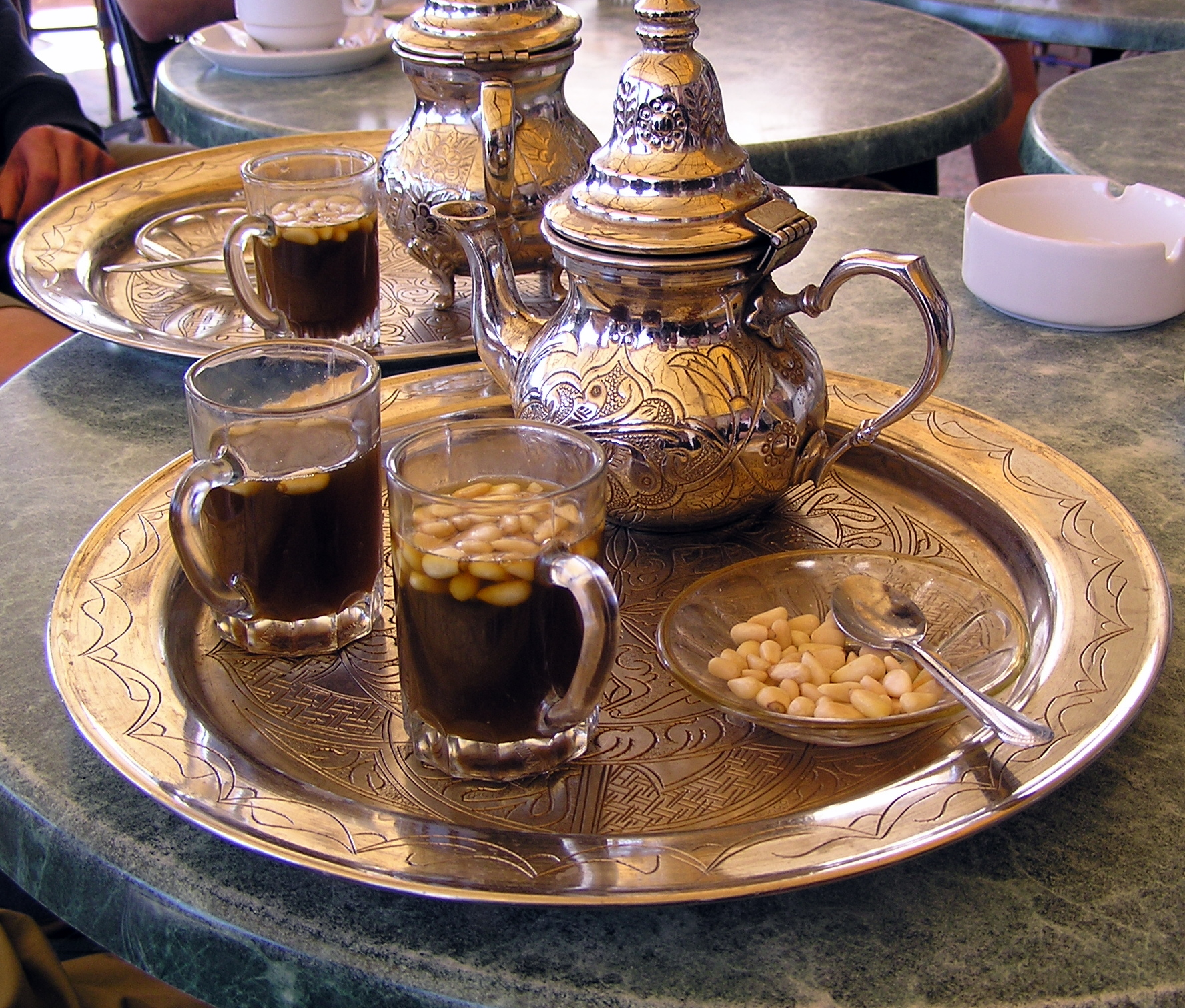
Plater of Tunisian tea with pine nuts

Tea with pine nuts, or in French, Thé aux pignons, is a traditional Tunisian culinary specialty. This type of maghrebi mint tea (or geranium tea sometimes in winter) is typically served during occasions such as weddings, family meetings or meetings between friends. The pine nuts can often be replaced by almonds or roasted peanuts.

== Service ==
A few teaspoons of pine nuts are placed in each glass before pouring the hot tea. The pine nuts float if the tea is very sweet; otherwise, they remain at the bottom of the glass.

Guests may also put the desired amount of pine nuts in their tea, which can be served without pine nuts.
