= Geranium (disambiguation) =

Geranium is a genus of 422 hardy flowering plant species.

Geranium may also refer to:

== Plants ==
- Geraniales, a small order of flowering plants
  - Geraniaceae, a family of flowering plants placed in the order
  - Pelargonium, a genus of flowering plants formerly included in Geranium, and still commonly called geraniums
- Chenopodium botrys, feathered geranium or Jerusalem oak goosefoot
- Ixora spp, jungle geranium or West Indian jasmine
- Saxifraga stolonifera, strawberry geranium or creeping saxifrage
- Rosa moyesii 'Geranium', a shrub rose cultivar

== Places ==
- Geranium, South Australia, a town in the Murraylands
- Geranium Plains, South Australia, a small town in the Mid North
- Geranium, Nebraska, a ghost town
- Geranium Township, Valley County, Nebraska
- "Geranium City", nickname of McDonough, Georgia
- Geraniums House, a landmark in Santa Felicidade, Brazil

== Ships and military equipment ==
- Géranium, a French Ham-class minesweeper
- HMAS Geranium, an Arabis-class sloop launched in 1915, originally HMS Geranium
- HMS Geranium (K16), a Flower-class corvette launched in 1940
- USS Geranium (1863), a steamship used as a tugboat
- Geran (weapons family), a series of Russian expendable strike weapons initially derived from Iran's Shahed series of one-way attack drones

== Arts and media ==
- A Geranium, 1911 movie starring Adele De Garde
- Geranium, the character of Ruby Dandridge in the Judy Canova Show
- "Geranium", a poem by Mary Ellen Solt
- "Geranium" (Geranio), a waltz by Pedro Elías Gutiérrez
- "Geranium Plant", an episode of Pat Novak for Hire
- "Geraniums", a poem by Roger Nash
- "The Geranium", a short story by Flannery O'Connor

== Other uses ==
- Geranium the First (Géranium I^{er}), the nickname of Pierre Bourque (politician), a Québec politician
- 1227 Geranium, an outer main-belt asteroid
- "Geranium", a codeword for telescopes used in the letters of John Dobson (astronomer)
- Geranium red, a shade of red
- Geranium (restaurant), a restaurant in Denmark

== See also ==
- Geranium oil, oil produced from Pelargonium graveolens
- List of Geranium species
