= Josef and Anna Beran Bruha House =

Historic house in Nebraska, United States

- Josef Bruha and Anna Beran
- U.S. National Register of Historic Places
- Location within Nebraska Location within the United States
- Location: West of Elyria, near Burwell, Nebraska
- Coordinates: 41.663230°N 99.164542°W
- Area: less than one acre
- Built: 1884-1885
- Built by: Bruha, Josef
- Architectural style: Dvoutrakt dum
- NRHP reference No.: 90000564
- Added to NRHP: April 5, 1990

The Josef and Anna Beran Bruha House, located west of Elyria, near Burwell in Valley County, Nebraska, was listed on the National Register of Historic Places in 1990.

It is one of only two examples in Valley County of the traditional Czech house type known as Dvoutrakt dum. It is a one-story house with brick walls and a hipped roof.

According to the NRHP nomination, Josef Bruha immigrated to Valley County in 1884 with his wife Anna Beran and six children from Kamýk, Klatovy and Plzeň in Bohemia. They came directly to Valley County, where members of the Beran family were already located, and Josef had partway built the house and had tilled 55 acres (22 ha) of land by 1885.
