= Elyria Township =

Elyria Township may refer to one of the following places in the United States:

- Elyria Township, Valley County, Nebraska
- Elyria Township, Lorain County, Ohio
