= Mira Creek, Nebraska =

Coordinates: 41°29′38″N 98°44′01″W

Mira Creek is a ghost town in Valley County, Nebraska, in the United States.

== History ==
A post office was established at Mira Creek in 1877, and remained in operation until it was discontinued in 1904. It was named from the Mira Creek nearby.
