= Vinton, Nebraska =

Coordinates: 41.53918°N 98.98037°W

Vinton is a ghost town in Valley County, Nebraska, in the United States.

== History ==
A post office was established at Vinton in 1875, and remained in operation until it was discontinued in 1888.
