= Coufal site =

- Coufal Site (25HW6)
- U.S. National Register of Historic Places
- U.S. National Historic Landmark
- Nearest city: Cotesfield, Nebraska
- NRHP reference No.: 66000446

Significant dates
- Added to NRHP: October 15, 1966
- Designated NHL: July 19, 1964

Coufal Site (25HW6) is an archaeological site in the U.S. state of Nebraska. It was declared a National Historic Landmark in 1964.

Located northwest of Cotesfield, the site is that of a large precontact Native American village dating to about 1100 CE, in the Central Plains tradition, believed to be intermediate between the Nebraska culture and the Upper Republican culture. The site includes at least 22 earth lodge sites.

== See also ==
- List of National Historic Landmarks in Nebraska
- National Register of Historic Places in Howard County, Nebraska
