= Ord Township, Valley County, Nebraska =

Ord Township
- Township
- Location in Valley County
- Coordinates: 41°36′43″N 098°55′30″W
- Country: United States
- State: Nebraska
- County: Valley

Area
  - Total: 35.60 sq mi (92.21 km^{2})
  - Land: 35.15 sq mi (91.05 km^{2})
  - Water: 0.45 sq mi (1.16 km^{2}) 1.26%
- Elevation: 2,021 ft (616 m)

Population (2020)
  - Total: 2,468
  - Density: 70.20/sq mi (27.11/km^{2})
- GNIS feature ID: 0838178

Ord Township is one of fifteen townships in Valley County, Nebraska, United States. The population was 2,468 at the 2020 census. A 2021 estimate placed the township's population at 2,472.

The City of Ord lies within the Township.

== See also ==
- County government in Nebraska
