= Yale Township, Valley County, Nebraska =

Yale Township
- Township
- Location in Valley County
- Coordinates: 41°26′41″N 099°02′28″W
- Country: United States
- State: Nebraska
- County: Valley

Area
  - Total: 35.77 sq mi (92.65 km^{2})
  - Land: 35.77 sq mi (92.65 km^{2})
  - Water: 0 sq mi (0 km^{2}) 0%
- Elevation: 2,247 ft (685 m)

Population (2020)
  - Total: 54/63
  - Density: 1.5/sq mi (0.58/km^{2})
- GNIS feature ID: 0838341

Yale Township is one of fifteen townships in Valley County, Nebraska, United States. The population was 54-63 at the 2020 census. A 2021 estimate placed the township's population at 54.

== Population & Demographics ==
=== Demographics ===
The township demographics are mostly caucasians, however there are a few hispanics within the township as well.

1. White (96.8%)
2. Hispanic (3.17%)

== See also ==
- County government in Nebraska
