= Noble Township, Valley County, Nebraska =

Noble Township
- Township
- Location in Valley County
- Coordinates: 41°41′38″N 098°50′15″W
- Country: United States
- State: Nebraska
- County: Valley

Area
  - Total: 52.73 sq mi (136.57 km^{2})
  - Land: 52.73 sq mi (136.57 km^{2})
  - Water: 0 sq mi (0 km^{2}) 0%
- Elevation: 2,208 ft (673 m)

Population (2020)
  - Total: 78
  - Density: 1.5/sq mi (0.57/km^{2})
- ZIP code: 68862
- Area code: 308
- GNIS feature ID: 0838160

Noble Township is one of fifteen townships in Valley County, Nebraska, United States. The population was 78 at the 2020 census. A 2021 estimate placed the township's population at 78.

== See also ==
- County government in Nebraska
