= June Holeman =

American barrel racer

June Holeman (born June 11, 1943–August 3, 2018) was an American professional rodeo cowgirl who specialized in barrel racing.

== Life ==
June E. Holeman was born on June 11, 1943, in Arcadia, Nebraska. Holeman was raised on her parents' ranch west of Arcadia; she never lived more than a mile away. She graduated from Arcadia High School. She married Donnie, and they had two daughters and a son. Holeman was a homemaker when she was not competing.

== Career ==
Holeman and Donnie competed together; she in barrel racing, he in calf roping. Holeman won many championships in the NCRA, NSRA, and MSRA. Later, she competed in the Girl's Rodeo Association, now the Women's Professional Rodeo Association. She won some Prairie Circuit Championships. She qualified for the inaugural RFD-TV's The American Rodeo on her horse "Tallboy", who she raised and trained at home. Other associations where Holeman won championships were the NE-4d, BBR, and BHA. Holeman was always involved with rodeo in some form, in her last years she was mentoring new riders. She was making plans for Cheyenne Frontier Days not long before her death.

In 2005, when Holeman qualified for the National Finals Rodeo (NFR) on Sparky at age 62, she beat Martha Josey's record for oldest NFR qualifier at 60 years old. She held the record until 2016, when Mary Burger qualified at age 68.

Holeman's horse, Sparky Impression, nicknamed Sparky, won the 2005 PRCA/AQHA Horse of the Year Award. Holeman received Sparky from a friend, and she started on the barrel pattern. Her friend called up Holeman and said that the horse was really fast so come see him. Holeman said the horse stood at only 14.1 hands, but he fit her style instantly. Sparky was a sorrel gelding. Holeman said, "I got him the end of June 2001 and by the Fourth of July, we were placing at the amateur rodeos," Holeman said. "He was real green but he just took to it well." Sparky died on October 14, 2016, age 27.

Holeman died on August 3, 2018, in Lincoln, Nebraska, at 73 years of age. She last resided in Arcadia, Nebraska.
