= Eureka Township, Valley County, Nebraska =

Eureka Township
- Township
- Location in Valley County
- Coordinates: 41°40′56″N 099°09′15″W
- Country: United States
- State: Nebraska
- County: Valley

Area
  - Total: 35.53 sq mi (92.03 km^{2})
  - Land: 35.53 sq mi (92.03 km^{2})
  - Water: 0 sq mi (0 km^{2}) 0%
- Elevation: 2,418 ft (737 m)

Population (2020)
  - Total: 36
  - Density: 1.0/sq mi (0.39/km^{2})
- GNIS feature ID: 0837994

EurekaTownship is one of fifteen townships in Valley County, Nebraska, United States. The population was 36 at the 2020 census. A 2021 estimate placed the township's population at 36.

== See also ==
- County government in Nebraska
