= Geranium, Nebraska =

Coordinates: 41.61029°N 99.13093°W

Geranium is a ghost town in Valley County, Nebraska, in the United States.

== History ==
A post office was established at Geranium in 1879, and remained in operation until it was discontinued in 1905. The town was named after the Geranium species of flowering plants.
