= Liberty Township, Valley County, Nebraska =

Liberty Township
- Township
- Location in Valley County
- Coordinates: 41°32′22″N 099°09′36″W
- Country: United States
- State: Nebraska
- County: Valley

Area
  - Total: 35.80 sq mi (92.73 km^{2})
  - Land: 35.8 sq mi (92.7 km^{2})
  - Water: 0.012 sq mi (0.03 km^{2}) 0.03%
- Elevation: 2,392 ft (729 m)

Population (2020)
  - Total: 30
  - Density: 0.84/sq mi (0.32/km^{2})
- GNIS feature ID: 0838089

Liberty Township is one of fifteen townships in Valley County, Nebraska, United States. The population was 30 at the 2020 census. A 2021 estimate placed the township's population at 30.

== See also ==
- County government in Nebraska
