= Independent Township, Valley County, Nebraska =

Independent Township
- Township
- Location in Valley County
- Coordinates: 41°26′03″N 098°49′04″W
- Country: United States
- State: Nebraska
- County: Valley

Area
  - Total: 35.76 sq mi (92.61 km^{2})
  - Land: 35.76 sq mi (92.61 km^{2})
  - Water: 0 sq mi (0 km^{2}) 0%
- Elevation: 2,130 ft (650 m)

Population (2020)
  - Total: 57
  - Density: 1.6/sq mi (0.62/km^{2})
- ZIP code: 68859
- Area code: 308
- GNIS feature ID: 0838065

Independent Township is one of fifteen townships in Valley County, Nebraska, United States. The population was 57 during the 2020 census. A 2021 estimate placed the township's population at 57.

== See also ==
- County government in Nebraska
