= Olean, Valley County, Nebraska =

Unincorporated community in Nebraska, U.S.

Coordinates: 41°33′39″N 98°48′27″W

Olean is an unincorporated community in Valley County, Nebraska, in the United States.

== History ==
Olean was a request stop on the railroad.
