= Mary Walker (rodeo cowgirl) =

American barrel racer (b. 1959)

- Occupation: Rodeo competitor
- Discipline: Barrel racing
- Born: January 26, 1959 (age 67); Ennis, Texas, United States
- Major wins/Championships: 2012 WPRA barrel racing world championship
- Lifetime achievements: $1 million in earnings 2nd oldest WPRA rodeo champion

Honors
- 2013 National Cowgirl Museum and Hall of Fame; 2013 Tad Lucas Award; 2012 RAM Top Gun Award; 2012 Jerry Ann Taylor Best Dressed Award

Significant horses
- Latte (Perculatin); Bojangles (A Frosty Please)

Mary Walker (born January 26, 1959) is an American former professional rodeo cowgirl who specialized in barrel racing. She won the Women's Professional Rodeo Association barrel racing world championship in 2012. Despite several traumatic events in the two preceding years, she persevered. She also became the oldest woman, at 53, in rodeo to win a world championship in the barrel racing event at the National Finals Rodeo. She was later surpassed by Mary Burger in 2016 when Burger won at age 68. She lost her only child to a car accident in 2011. Two months later, Latte, her horse, fell on her during competition and severely injured her. It was about a year and a half after these incidents that she won her world title. Walker was inducted into the National Cowgirl Museum and Hall of Fame in 2013.

== Personal life ==
Walker was born in Ennis, Texas, on January 26, 1959. She grew up riding horses, and started barrel racing as a youth. According to Walker, she had a positive childhood although her father died when she was 19. Deciding against attending college, she got a job and worked the rodeos on the weekends. In 1983, she married Byron Walker, who became an elite rodeo performer. They resided in Ennis but now live in Abilene, Texas. Byron is the 1981 Professional Rodeo Cowboys Association (PRCA) World Steer Wrestling Champion, and qualified for the National Finals Rodeo (NFR) 16 times. He was inducted into the ProRodeo Hall of Fame in 2014.

Walker's favorite pastimes include deep sea fishing and mowing the lawn. She also has a dog, Buster, who goes everywhere with her. Walker and her husband had one child, their son, Reagon. Reagon became a professional steer wrestler, with a promising future. On April 23, 2011, Reagon and his girlfriend were involved in a car accident, where he died due to his injuries. Two months later, in a competition in Crosby, Texas, while running around the third barrel, Latte slid and fell on Walker. The horse was fine, but Walker suffered a shattered pelvis, multiple breaks in her hip, two broken vertebrae, and two broken toes. She underwent surgery the next day, and the doctors used 8 plates and 11 pins to secure her hip. "I was four months in a wheelchair, three months in physical therapy. I went from the wheelchair to a walker, then to a crutch, then to a cane." Walker eventually returned to horse riding, but lost a lot of rodeos until she regained trust in herself and Latte. Byron would tell her that she was going to win the championship that year, which she eventually did.

== Career ==
Walker joined the Women's Professional Rodeo Association (WPRA) in 1983. Barrel racing is sanctioned by the WPRA, while other rodeo events are sanctioned by the Professional Rodeo Cowboy's Association (PRCA). The barrel racing events take place at PRCA rodeos, alongside events such as bull riding and tie-down roping. All of the championship rodeo events are held together (except steer roping which has its own finals event, the National Finals Steer Roping (NFSR)), at the National Finals Rodeo (NFR), which is held every December at the Thomas & Mack Center, in Las Vegas, Nevada.

Although 1983 was her first year as a professional barrel racer, she almost qualified for the NFR, missing by only $2,000. She did well in part because she used her high school rodeo horse, Jet Barb. After that year, however, she sold her horse and for a number of years her rodeo activity was primarily supporting the rodeo careers of her husband Byron, and later their son, Reagon. Nevertheless, she still purchased her WPRA card every year, even though Byron was sure she would not use it. But Walker would say, "You never know." Walker occasionally competed at the nearby Mesquite Championship Rodeo in her spare time for extra money. Her husband reached elite levels in rodeo, and her son seem fated to follow.

She finally qualified and competed at her first NFR in 2012, when she was 53. Thereafter, she qualified for the NFR 5 times, from 2012 through 2016. She also qualified for the RAM National Circuit Finals Rodeo (RNCFR) in the Prairie Circuit one time in 2015. In addition, she competed on the Montana Circuit a couple of times. In 2012, Walker made it to the final round of the All American ProRodeo, which was held in Waco, Texas. In Bracket III, in the second round, she clocked a 16.13 second barrel run and earned $2,779. In the semifinals, she clocked another 16.13 second barrel run and earned $2,400. In the final round, she won the event with a record-setting 15.72 second run which, as of 2018, is still in the record books.

=== Season 2012 ===
Walker went to Guymon, Oklahoma, to compete and won the average there. She kept going to rodeos and moving up the standings. Then, in July, she did something her husband never managed: she won at Cheyenne Frontier Days. She won the first round by a less than a second. Then she won the final round, despite the fact that Latte almost knocked down the second barrel. With her win at Cheyenne Frontier Days, she added $16,185 to her season winnings.

Walker went into the NFR with $93,000 in season earnings, which was $43,000 behind the leader. She was ranked 3rd in the World Standings for the season. Over the 10-day finals, which features the top 15 barrel racers, she won four rounds. Walker and Latte swept the NFR to win her first and only World Barrel Racing Championship. Walker set a new earnings record for the NFR of $146,941.10. Walker also won the RAM Truck Top Gun Award for the highest earnings in a single event at the NFR. She also won the Jerry Ann Best Dressed Cowgirl Award. Walker placed 6th in the Finals and earned $2,944.71. Through the 10th Round, Walker placed second in the NFR Average and clocked a total 143.52/10 for an aggregate of $37,986.78. She won $146,491 total in NFR earnings, the most of the 120 competitors at the NFR. In the WPRA World Standings, she finished the year out in first place with total year earnings of $274,233.28. She won nearly $70,000 more than the second-place WPRA finisher Carlee Pierce of Stephenville, Texas.

- Round 1 — 1st Place (13.75 seconds)
- Round 2 — 1st Place (13.80 seconds)
- Round 3 — 1st Place (13.69 seconds)
- Round 4 — Hit a barrel (18.90 seconds)
- Round 5 — 4th Place (13.89 seconds)
- Round 6 — 2nd Place (13.76 seconds)
- Round 7 — 1st Place (13.72 seconds)
- Round 8 — Didn't place (14.10 seconds)
- Round 9 — 3rd Place (13.90 seconds)
- Round 10 — 6th Place (14.01 seconds)

I want to thank my son, Reagon", said a tearful Walker. "A lot of emotions are going on, especially yesterday. I really was upset with the fact that Reagon wasn't here with me to celebrate, but I know he is in spirit.

Other rodeos she won in 2012 include: the All-American Finals in Waco, Texas; the Ellensburg Rodeo in Ellensburg, Washington; the Missoula Stampede in Missoula, Montana; the Snake River Stampede in Nampa, Idaho; Cheyenne Frontier Days in Cheyenne, Wyoming; the Navajo Nation Fourth of July Rodeo in Window Rock, Arizona; the Earl Anderson Memorial Rodeo in Grover, Colorado; the Ute Mountain Roundup in Cortez, Colorado; the Ken Lance Memorial in Ada, Oklahoma; the Flint Hills Rodeo in Strong City, Kansas; the Rodeo Killeen in Killeen, Texas; and the Arcadia All-FLA Championship Rodeo. She was co-champion at the Chisholm Trail Stampede Rodeo in Duncan, Oklahoma.

=== Season 2013 ===
In 2013, Walker continued to compete, winning the Cowboy Capital of the World Rodeo in Stephenville, Texas, the Pasadena Livestock Show and Rodeo, in Pasadena, Texas, the Champions Challenge, in Kissimmee, Florida, the Walla Walla, Washington, the Frontier Days Rodeo, the Sanders County Fair & Rodeo in Plains, Montana, the Jerome County Fair & Rodeo in Idaho, the Montana's Biggest Weekend in Dillon, Montana, the Ogden Pioneer Days Rodeo in Utah, the Eagle County Fair & Rodeo in Colorado, the Rocky Pro Rodeo in Rocky Mountain House, Alberta, the Pony Express Days Rodeo, in Eagle Mountain, Utah, the inaugural Champions Challenge in Redding, California, the San Angelo Stock Show and Rodeo in San Angelo, Texas, and the 75th Annual Brighton Field Day Festival & Rodeo in Okeechobee, Florida. Her money winnings qualified her again for the NFR, where she placed in 7 out of 10 rounds at the 2013 finals. She placed 6th in the average, and finished as the reserve world champion. She won $92,248. She was inducted into the National Cowgirl Museum and Hall of Fame this year.

=== Season 2014 ===
On March 18, the Rodeo Roundup reported that Walker announced she is being forced to auction off her horse Latte due to a court order. To summarize, when the Walkers bought Latte in 2011, they purchased 90 percent while Cheri Cogburn retained 10 percent, and they formed an LLC, the purpose of which was so Walker would never have to sell him. However, Cogburn decided to sue for partition of sale for her 10%. Her last offer of $250,000 for settlement left no choice as the Walkers could not meet that. Since Latte is the only asset of the LLC, Walker must auction him to get Cogburn her settlement. They held the auction for Latte in November in Justin, Texas, at the Waxahachie Rodeo Complex. Mark Wallace, the owner of the Justin Discount Boots stores, purchased Latte for $850,000, and said Walker can continue riding him. "The bottom line is a friend of mine bought Latte and turned around and said, ‘Mary, you will ride him forever,’ " Byron Walker said.

Walker went on to win the following rodeos that year: she won the average title at the Texas Prairie Circuit Finals Rodeo, the Champions Challenge in Omaha, Nebraska, New Mexico State Fair and Rodeo in Albuquerque, New Mexico, the Montana's Biggest Weekend in Dillon, Montana, the Northwest Montana Pro Rodeo in Kalispell, Montana, the Yellowstone River Round-Up in Billings, Montana, the Sand & Sage Roundup in Lamar, Colorado, the Cedar City in Utah, the PRCA Championship Rodeo, the Airdrie in Alberta, the ProRodeo, the Helotes in Texas, the Festival Association Rodeo, the National Western Stock Show and Rodeo in Denver, Colorado, and the Champions Challenge in Kissimmee, Florida.

She finished the season ranked 7th in the World Standings. She earned $145,686 for the year including the $45,947 she earned at the NFR and placed 12th in the average, by placing in 4 out of the 10 rounds. She won the 8th round with a time of 13.79 seconds and the 10th round with a time of 13.90 seconds.

=== Season 2015 ===
Walker won the Tri-State Rodeo in Fort Madison, Iowa, she won the Champions Challenge in Kennewick, Washington, she won the Rocky Pro Rodeo in Rocky Mountain House, Alberta, Canada, and she won the Rodeo Killeen in Killeen, Texas. Her season earnings were $135,759. She qualified for the NFR and was ranked 11th in the World Standings. She won $15,654 at the NFR.

=== Season 2016 ===
Walker started 2016 at RodeoHouston, part of the Houston Livestock Show and Rodeo in Houston, Texas, that ran from late February through early March. RodeoHouston has one of the highest prize money awards on the PRCA circuit. Only 40 cowgirls are invited, who are then divided into five Super Series with eight competitors in each. Each Super Series pays three rounds. Then, the top four winners move into the SemiFinals. Walker won all of her three rounds and qualified for the semifinals. On Sunday afternoon, March 6, she posted the best time of the rodeo at 14.08 seconds in the third round. Walker earned $3,000 in each of the first three rounds to max out her earnings at $9,000. She placed eighth in the Semi-Finals. She also was awarded a Wild Card win on Super Sunday and came in second place to Mary Burger.

Her results for all rounds of the rodeo were:

- Round 1 first place, 14.29 seconds, $3,000
- Round 2 first place, 14.25 seconds, $3,000
- Round 3 first place, 14.08 seconds, $3,000

Total $9,000 advances to SemiFinals Source

- SemiFinals I, Eighth place, 19.26 seconds
- Wild card win, 14.29 seconds, $750

On Sunday, July 17, when Walker competed in the Showdown Sunday at Calgary Stampede in Calgary, Alberta, Canada, she finished second place by less than 1 second to first-place winner Mary Burger. Her paycheck for $25,000 brought her into the limited company of women who won $1 million in lifetime rodeo earnings. She became the 7th woman to have done so. This record made both her and husband million dollar rodeo winners. Walker gave a lot of the credit to her horse, Latte.

During the last week of August, Pueblo, Colorado, holds the Colorado State Fair. One of the events is a four-day PRCA rodeo. In 2014, the rodeo joined the Champions Challenge tour, and more of rodeo's best performers added southern Colorado to their schedules. In 2016, Walker competed there in the Champions Challenge for the first time since she had been there in the 1980s. She had the last run in the fourth performance on a Monday night, and Latte made the run in 17.26 seconds. The competitors who attempted to beat her time on Tuesday night did not come close, and thus Walker was named the winner, so she won $2,942 for the event. After having Wednesday night off, 11 women, counting Walker, went on to the 8th stop of the Champions Challenge, also in Pueblo. That night, she made a mistake on Latte and took a penalty, ending her competition at the event.

Walker decided to head back north after the Fair rather than to hit rodeos in nearby Texas. Walker had the All American ProRodeo Series on her mind. To qualify for the Finals, which are held annually in Waco, Texas, competitors must compete in a minimum of 30 rodeos. Last year she failed to get in the required number of rodeos. Walker had also been competing on the Montana circuit that year. She went on to place at Cody, Wyoming, win at Dillon, Montana, and other rodeos and earned herself spot in the series.

On the weekend of January 14, 2017, Walker was planning to compete at the 2016 Montana ProRodeo Circuit Finals in Great Falls. Walker was in 2nd place in the circuit standings with $14,351 so far. Lisa Lockhart was the leader, and Walker was behind her by $3,569. In the past, Walker had competed in her local Prairie circuit in Texas, and she once won the average there, in the 2015 Finals in Waco, Texas. She had switched circuits because the prize money was better in the Montana circuit.

In May during the last weekend, Walker started her circuit season. She won at Grassy Butte, North Dakota; she also won at Kalispell, Bell, and Dillon, Montana. Then she went from one end of Montana to the next and won $4,750 at Baker, in the far eastern end of the state, then in Kalispell, in the far northwest. By the end of summer she had won another $3,116 at Plains and Dillon during Labor Day weekend. She reached her goal by entering 17 rodeos in the circuit; the requirement was 15.

Walker entered another NFR this year. She had $112,216 in her regular season earnings. She was third in the World Standings. She has combined earnings of $300,000 for her past four NFR appearances, not counting what she will win at this year's NFR. For the first time, she brought a backup horse, nicknamed Bojangles. along with Latte.

Other winnings included the Lewiston Roundup in Idaho, Montana's Biggest Weekend, Northwest Montana Fair & Rodeo, Canyonlands Rodeo in Utah, Spanish Fork, Utah, 56th Belt in Montana, Maah Daah Hey Stampede in North Dakota, and La Fiesta de los Vaqueros in Arizona, the Final Round. She finished 4th in the average at the National Western Stock Show and Rodeo, and won the Champions Challenge in Florida on Bojangles.

=== Season 2017 ===
On January 19, Walker competed in the Fort Worth Stock Show and Rodeo event, in the tournament style Fort Worth Super Shootout, which is held in the Will Rogers Coliseum. There are two runs, a qualifying run and then a championship run. Walker and Latte were one of the 4 to go on to the championship run as they had the fastest time, 17.064. In the finals run, Walker's time was the fastest at 17.077 so she and Latte collected the prize money. Walker represented her team, RodeoHouston. There were teams from eight of the most prestigious rodeos. Walker won her fourth time in a row at this event. RodeoHouston won the event for the third time in a row.

Walker won the barrel racing event at the Fort Bend County Fair and Rodeo, Rosenberg, Texas, which takes place during the end of September through the beginning of June.

=== Career summary ===
In 2016, Walker became the WPRA's 7th millionaire. As of January 26, 2017, Walker's career earnings were $1,047,424. Her 2016 earnings were $122,816. Her 2016 NFR earnings alone were $10,000. She was 14th in the 2016 NFR Final Standings. Walker has one World Barrel Racing Champion title which she won in 2012.

Walker was the oldest rodeo world champion in the WPRA at 53 years of age in 2012; in 2016 Mary Burger set a new record of 68 years for the WPRA and the PRCA, but Walker remains the second oldest champion.

=== Competition horses ===
- Perculatin, nicknamed Latte, a bay gelding foaled in 2000 and still competing in 2013. Latte has notable Quarter Horse lineage. He was sired by Dash for Perks, and out of Curiosity Corners. Dash for Perks was sired by Dash For Cash, who was sired by Rocket Wrangler. Dash for Perks dam was Perks who was sired by Easy Jet. Perculatin was the AQHA/WPRA Barrel Racing Horse of the Year in 2012.
- A Frosty Please, nicknamed "Bojangles", was foaled in 2010 and Walker began using him in competition in 2016. He was sired by Bug in My Frosty out of Dash to Please. Bojangles is a sorrel horse with a blaze on his face.

== Retirement ==
Walker officially retired from barrel racing in 2023.

== Honors ==
- 2012 RAM Top Gun Award at the NFR (for most money earned at the NFR)
- 2012 Jerry Ann Taylor Best Dressed Award at the NFR.
- 2013 Tad Lucas Award from the National Cowboy and Western Heritage Museum.
- 2013 National Cowgirl Museum and Hall of Fame.
- 2016 Walker became the WPRA's 7th millionaire.

== Bibliography ==
- PRCA Awards (PDF). Professional Rodeo Cowboys Association. 2021.
- 2021 WPRA NFR Media Guide | Barrel Racing World Champions 1948 - 2020. Women's Professional Rodeo Association. Archived from the original on April 12, 2022.
- Randall, Tanya (March 22, 2016). Triumphant Return - Sadiefamouslastwords & Mary Burger Earn $54,750 Rodeo Houston Championship (PDF) (Volume 10: Issue: 22 ed.). Barrel Racing Report.
