= Enterprise Township, Valley County, Nebraska =

Enterprise Township
- Township
- Location in Valley County
- Coordinates: 41°31′21″N 098°55′09″W
- Country: United States
- State: Nebraska
- County: Valley

Area
  - Total: 35.77 sq mi (92.65 km^{2})
  - Land: 35.77 sq mi (92.65 km^{2})
  - Water: 0 sq mi (0 km^{2}) 0%
- Elevation: 2,090 ft (637 m)

Population (2020)
  - Total: 105
  - Density: 2.94/sq mi (1.13/km^{2})
- ZIP code: 68862
- Area code: 308
- GNIS feature ID: 0837993

Enterprise Township is one of fifteen townships in Valley County, Nebraska, United States. The population was 105 at the 2020 census. A 2021 estimate placed the township's population at 105.

== See also ==
- County government in Nebraska
