= Sumpter =

A sumpter is an older term for a pack animal. Sumpter also subsequently became a surname and place name.

It may refer to:

== Places ==
=== United states ===
- Sumpter, Arkansas
- Sumpter, Oregon
- Sumpter, Texas, a ghost town
- Sumpter, Wisconsin, a town
- Sumpter Township, Cumberland County, Illinois
- Sumpter Township, Wayne County, Michigan

== People ==
- Barry Sumpter (born 1965), American basketball player
- Donald Sumpter (born 1943), British actor
- Jeremy Sumpter (born 1989), American actor
- John Sumpter, scientist
- Justin Sumpter (born 1996), American football player
- Michael Sumpter (1947–2001), American serial killer
- Rachell Sumpter (born 1972), painter
- Tika Sumpter (born 1980), American actor
- Thomas Sumter (1734-1832) American military officer and politician

== See also ==
- Sumter (disambiguation)
- Fort Sumter
