= Davis Creek Township, Valley County, Nebraska =

Davis Creek Township
- Township
- Location in Valley County
- Coordinates: 41°26′18″N 098°55′10″W
- Country: United States
- State: Nebraska
- County: Valley

Area
  - Total: 35.97 sq mi (93.15 km^{2})
  - Land: 35.97 sq mi (93.15 km^{2})
  - Water: 0 sq mi (0 km^{2}) 0%
- Elevation: 2,142 ft (653 m)

Population (2020)
  - Total: 45
  - Density: 1.3/sq mi (0.48/km^{2})
- GNIS feature ID: 0837957

Davis Creek Township is one of fifteen townships in Valley County, Nebraska, United States. The population was 45 at the 2020 census. A 2021 estimate placed the township's population at 45.

== See also ==
- County government in Nebraska
