= Vinton, West Virginia =

Coordinates: 38.2276083°N 80.9931565°W

Vinton is a ghost town in Nicholas County, in the U.S. state of West Virginia.

== History ==
A post office called Vinton was established in 1877, and remained in operation until 1940. The community most likely was named after the local Vinton family.
