= JetRadar =

Travel search engine

- Company type: Subsidiary of Go Travel Un Limited
- Available in: English, French, German, Italian, Spanish
- Founded: 2012
- Headquarters: Phuket, {{{location_country}}}
- Area served: Worldwide
- Founder: Nikita Kirgintsev
- Key people: Anton Baitsur (CEO)
- Industry: Travel, Technology, Search Engine
- Employees: 55 (2013)
- Website: jetradar.com
- Launched: May 2012

JetRadar is a travel search engine that allows users to compare airline prices and offers, specializing in low-cost airfare.

JetRadar is multilingual. Users can search in English, German, French, Spanish and Italian. There is also a Thai version of the website, which launched in November 2013. The company is operated by Go Travel UN Limited, a Hong Kong registered travel holding that also owns such brands as Travelpayouts, Hotellook and additionally provides local search engines for the Eastern European and Central Asian markets under the Aviasales brand name, which is the company's sister-brand.

== History ==
JetRadar began in 2010 as an airfare blog Specavia run by founder Nikita Kirgintsev. In 2011 the project was acquired by Go Travel Un Limited. As the result of reorganization the company announced in 2017, Jetradar was merged with Aviasales.

In May 2012 JetRadar released an English version of the company's main web functions. Since this time the English version has become a stand-alone project with 535 airline partners and the cooperation of 35 travel agencies worldwide. In February 2014, the companies received a $10 million investment from iTech Capital, which then took a minority stake in the company.

JetRadar's headquarters is located in Phuket, Thailand. There are additional offices in Sydney, Hong Kong, Moscow and Saint Petersburg.

== Product and services ==
JetRadar lists online flight deals and travel packages from around the world. To date, JetRadar is active in 14 markets across the globe, including the United States, UK, Germany, and Australia.

In 2014, JetRadar launched Magic Fare, a tool that aims to find the lowest prices in long-haul flights with a layover by searching different tariffs on flights.

== Other services ==
ECO Rank is one of the JetRadar's filters. It uses an ICAO approach to identify flights with less harmful emissions. ECO ranks flight options based on aviation emissions, traffic forecasts, and aircraft range.

== Mobile apps ==
JetRadar is iPhone, iPad and Android compatible. The app shows prices including tax.
