= Vinton, Missouri =

Extinct hamlet in Missouri, U.S.

Coordinates: 38.355297°N 94.528287°W

Vinton is an extinct town in Bates County, in the U.S. state of Missouri.

A post office called Vinton was established in 1871, and remained in operation until 1904. The community was named after the local Vinton family.
