= Sumter S. Arnim =

American dentist and academic

Sumter Smith Arnim (1904 - 1990) was an American dentist and academic. He was dean of the University of Texas Graduate School of Biomedical Sciences at Houston and he conducted significant research work on dental plaque.

== Biography ==
Arnim was admitted to the Yale School of Medicine, and he quickly elected to pursue a Ph.D. in pathology instead of a medical degree. During World War II, Arnim was a faculty member at the Medical College of Virginia, and he pointed out that dental disease was only coming into the spotlight because it was impacting the availability of soldiers for the war. He called for more dentists to be trained in research methods so that oral health could be better understood. Arnim later expanded on work from Charles C. Bass related to dental plaque; he used phase-contrast microscopy and cinemicrography to more closely study plaque. He developed an early form of the disclosing tablet using erythrosine.

Arnim worked with oral pathologist Barnet M. Levy at the Medical College of Virginia, and he recruited Levy to the University of Texas Dental Branch at Houston in 1957, where Levy later helped to establish a dental research institute. In the 1960s, Arnim directed graduate and postgraduate programs at the school, which included degree plans in orthodontics, prosthodontics and oral surgery, and continuing education classes for practicing dentists. Arnim was dean of the University of Texas Graduate School of Biomedical Sciences at Houston (GSBS) from 1966 to 1970. By 1967, enrollment at the GSBS had doubled from its founding and Arnim was credited with improving faculty morale.

From 1968 to 1972, Arnim was a preventive dentistry consultant to the Surgeon General of the United States Air Force.
