= Elyria Township, Valley County, Nebraska =

Elyria Township
- Township
- Location in Valley County
- Coordinates: 41°42′00″N 099°00′57″W
- Country: United States
- State: Nebraska
- County: Valley

Area
  - Total: 53.10 sq mi (137.52 km^{2})
  - Land: 52.34 sq mi (135.57 km^{2})
  - Water: 0.75 sq mi (1.95 km^{2}) 1.42%
- Elevation: 2,077 ft (633 m)

Population (2020)
  - Total: 167
  - Density: 3.19/sq mi (1.23/km^{2})
- GNIS feature ID: 0837989

Elyria Township is one of fifteen townships in Valley County, Nebraska, United States. The population was 167 at the 2020 census. A 2021 estimate placed the township's population at 167.

The Village of Elyria lies within the Township.

== See also ==
- County government in Nebraska
