= Geranium Township, Valley County, Nebraska =

Geranium Township
- Township
- Location in Valley County
- Coordinates: 41°36′35″N 099°09′26″W
- Country: United States
- State: Nebraska
- County: Valley

Area
  - Total: 35.76 sq mi (92.63 km^{2})
  - Land: 35.76 sq mi (92.63 km^{2})
  - Water: 0 sq mi (0 km^{2}) 0%
- Elevation: 2,330 ft (710 m)

Population (2020)
  - Total: 65
  - Density: 1.8/sq mi (0.70/km^{2})
- GNIS feature ID: 0838024

Geranium Township is one of fifteen townships in Valley County, Nebraska, United States. The population was 65 at the 2020 census. A 2021 estimate placed the township's population at 65.

== See also ==
- County government in Nebraska
