= North Loup Township, Valley County, Nebraska =

North Loup Township
- Township
- Location in Valley County
- Coordinates: 41°32′06″N 098°49′14″W
- Country: United States
- State: Nebraska
- County: Valley

Area
  - Total: 40.82 sq mi (105.73 km^{2})
  - Land: 39.98 sq mi (103.56 km^{2})
  - Water: 0.84 sq mi (2.17 km^{2}) 2.05%
- Elevation: 2,136 ft (651 m)

Population (2020)
  - Total: 385
  - Density: 9.63/sq mi (3.72/km^{2})
- GNIS feature ID: 0838165

North Loup Township is one of fifteen townships in Valley County, Nebraska, United States. The population was 385 at the 2020 census. A 2021 estimate placed the township's population at 386.

The Village of North Loup lies within the Township.

== See also ==
- County government in Nebraska
