= Vinton (given name) =

Vinton is a unisex given name. Bearers of the name include:

== Men ==
- Vinton Cassidy (fl. 1992–1998), American politician
- Vint Cerf (born 1943), American internet researcher
- Vinton Freedley (1891–1969), American theater and television producer
- Vinton Hayworth (1906–1970), American actor, playwright and screenwriter
- Vinton Rambo (1909–1980), American football and track coach, educator, and college administrator

== Women ==
- Vinton Beckett (1923–2018), Jamaican high jumper, long jumper and hurdler
- Vinton Liddell Pickens (1900–1993), American artist and activist
