= Sumter, Nebraska =

Unincorporated community in Nebraska, U.S.

Coordinates: 41°35′22″N 98°47′18″W

Sumter is an unincorporated community in Valley County, Nebraska, in the United States.

== History ==
A post office was established at Sumter in 1894, and was discontinued the following year.
