= Arcadia, Nebraska =

Village in Valley County, Nebraska, United States

- Village
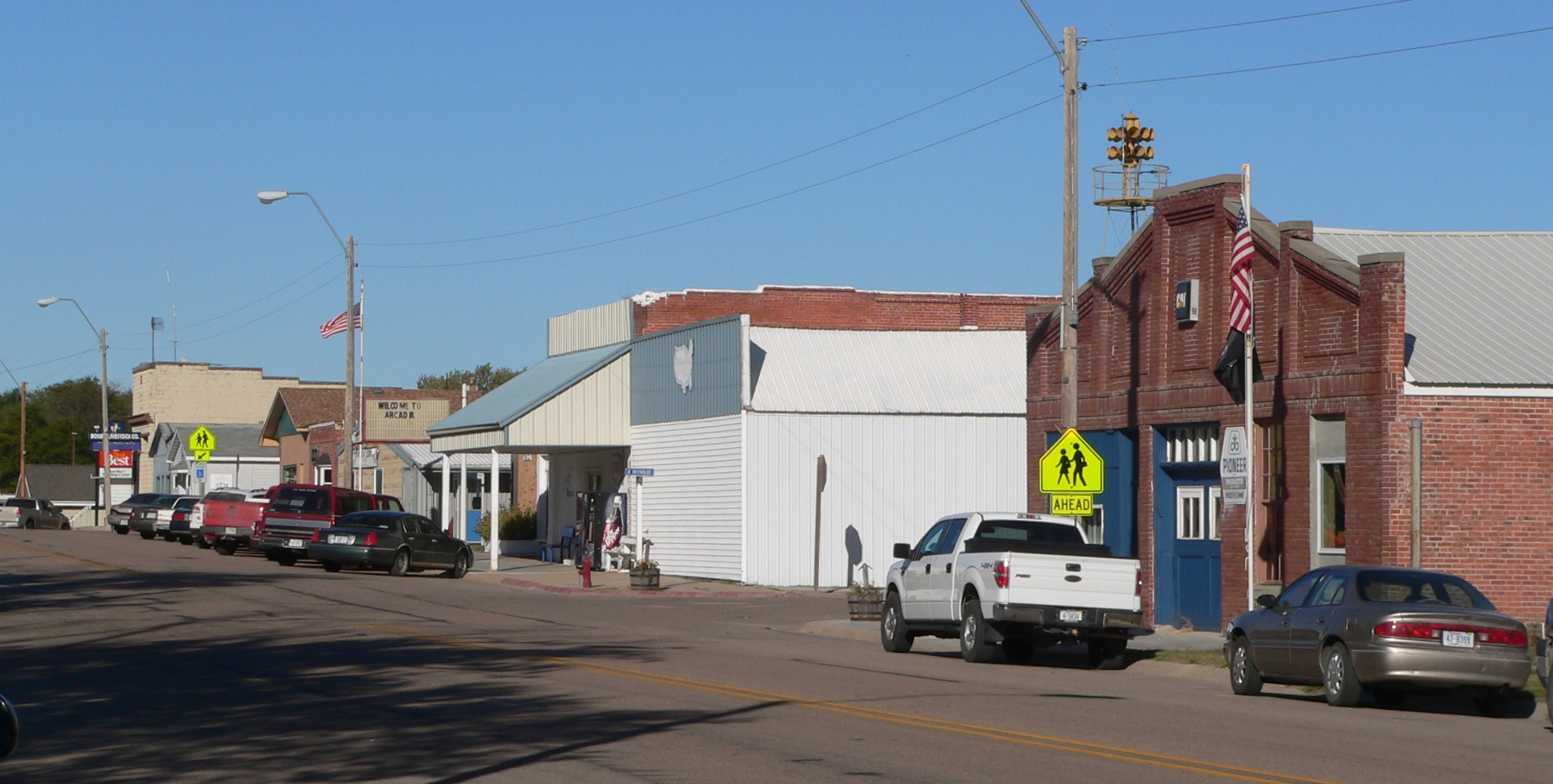
- Downtown Arcadia

- Location of Arcadia, Nebraska
- Coordinates: 41°25′29″N 99°07′34″W
- Country: United States
- State: Nebraska
- County: Valley

Area
  - Total: 0.57 sq mi (1.48 km^{2})
  - Land: 0.57 sq mi (1.48 km^{2})
  - Water: 0 sq mi (0.00 km^{2})
- Elevation: 2,159 ft (658 m)

Population (2020)
  - Total: 283
  - Density: 495.5/sq mi (191.31/km^{2})
- Time zone: UTC-6 (Central (CST))
  - Summer (DST): UTC-5 (CDT)
- ZIP code: 68815
- Area code: 308
- FIPS code: 31-01850
- GNIS feature ID: 2397977
- Website: www.arcadiane.com

Arcadia is a village in Valley County, Nebraska, United States. As of the 2020 census, Arcadia had a population of 283.

== History ==
Arcadia was platted in 1885 when it was certain that the railroad would soon be extended to that point. The name was apparently chosen by the postmaster, Sarah Coulter Hawthorne, in 1874 in reference to the wild roses which were common to the area as she mistakenly believed the name to mean "feast of flowers."

== Geography ==
According to the United States Census Bureau, the village has a total area of 0.57 square miles (1.48 km^{2}), all of it land.

=== Climate ===
Climate data for Arcadia, Nebraska (coordinates:41.4267°N 99.1272°W, 1991-2020)
Month	Jan	Feb	Mar	Apr	May	Jun	Jul	Aug	Sep	Oct	Nov	Dec	Year
Average precipitation inches (mm)	0.49 (12)	0.60 (15)	1.43 (36)	2.74 (70)	4.09 (104)	3.96 (101)	3.27 (83)	2.95 (75)	2.24 (57)	1.88 (48)	0.96 (24)	0.69 (18)	25.3 (643)
Average snowfall inches (cm)	5.5 (14)	5.8 (15)	4.1 (10)	2.8 (7.1)	0.1 (0.25)	0.0 (0.0)	0.0 (0.0)	0.0 (0.0)	0.0 (0.0)	0.8 (2.0)	2.4 (6.1)	4.3 (11)	25.8 (65.45)
Average extreme snow depth inches (cm)	4 (10)	5 (13)	3 (7.6)	1 (2.5)	0 (0)	0 (0)	0 (0)	0 (0)	0 (0)	1 (2.5)	2 (5.1)	4 (10)	5 (13)
Average precipitation days (≥ 0.01 in)	3	4.1	5.2	7.8	9.3	9.8	8.3	7.3	5.8	5.4	3.6	3.1	72.7
Average snowy days (≥ 0.01 in)	2.2	2.8	1.4	1.1	0	0	0	0	0	0.5	1.2	2.3	11.5
Source: NOAA

== Demographics ==
Historical population
Census	Pop.	Note	%±
1890	429		—
1900	374		−12.8%
1910	618		65.2%
1920	745		20.6%
1930	711		−4.6%
1940	663		−6.8%
1950	574		−13.4%
1960	446		−22.3%
1970	418		−6.3%
1980	412		−1.4%
1990	385		−6.6%
2000	359		−6.8%
2010	311		−13.4%
2020	283		−9.0%
U.S. Decennial Census

=== 2010 census ===
As of the census of 2010, there were 311 people, 138 households, and 91 families living in the village. The population density was 545.6 inhabitants per square mile (210.7/km^{2}). There were 176 housing units at an average density of 308.8 per square mile (119.2/km^{2}). The racial makeup of the village was 98.7% White, 0.3% Native American, 0.3% Asian, and 0.6% from two or more races. Hispanic or Latino of any race were 2.9% of the population.

There were 138 households, of which 29.0% had children under the age of 18 living with them, 56.5% were married couples living together, 5.1% had a female householder with no husband present, 4.3% had a male householder with no wife present, and 34.1% were non-families. 31.9% of all households were made up of individuals, and 21.7% had someone living alone who was 65 years of age or older. The average household size was 2.25 and the average family size was 2.78.

The median age in the village was 46.7 years. 25.1% of residents were under the age of 18; 4.2% were between the ages of 18 and 24; 17.4% were from 25 to 44; 26.5% were from 45 to 64; and 27% were 65 years of age or older. The gender makeup of the village was 48.6% male and 51.4% female.

=== 2000 census ===
As of the census of 2000, there were 359 people, 155 households, and 95 families living in the village. The population density was 637.4 inhabitants per square mile (246.1/km^{2}). There were 189 housing units at an average density of 335.6 per square mile (129.6/km^{2}). The racial makeup of the village was 98.89% White, 0.56% African American, 0.28% Asian, and 0.28% from two or more races. Hispanic or Latino of any race were 0.84% of the population.

There were 155 households, out of which 27.1% had children under the age of 18 living with them, 56.8% were married couples living together, 2.6% had a female householder with no husband present, and 38.1% were non-families. 35.5% of all households were made up of individuals, and 24.5% had someone living alone who was 65 years of age or older. The average household size was 2.32 and the average family size was 3.04.

In the village, the population was spread out, with 27.9% under the age of 18, 5.0% from 18 to 24, 23.1% from 25 to 44, 17.0% from 45 to 64, and 27.0% who were 65 years of age or older. The median age was 40 years. For every 100 females, there were 87.0 males. For every 100 females age 18 and over, there were 85.0 males.

As of 2000 the median income for a household in the village was $24,464, and the median income for a family was $33,750. Males had a median income of $24,107 versus $20,500 for females. The per capita income for the village was $15,015. About 5.1% of families and 9.4% of the population were below the poverty line, including 11.0% of those under age 18 and 8.3% of those age 65 or over.

== See also ==
- List of municipalities in Nebraska
- June Holeman, American champion barrel-racer, from Arcadia
