= Vinton Township, Valley County, Nebraska =

Vinton Township
- Township
- Location in Valley County
- Coordinates: 41°32′20″N 099°02′14″W
- Country: United States
- State: Nebraska
- County: Valley

Area
  - Total: 35.65 sq mi (92.33 km^{2})
  - Land: 35.65 sq mi (92.33 km^{2})
  - Water: 0 sq mi (0 km^{2}) 0%
- Elevation: 2,211 ft (674 m)

Population (2020)
  - Total: 85
  - Density: 2.4/sq mi (0.92/km^{2})
- GNIS feature ID: 0838309

Vinton Township is one of fifteen townships in Valley County, Nebraska, United States. The population was 85 at the 2020 census. A 2021 estimate placed the township's population at 85.

== See also ==
- County government in Nebraska
