= North Loup, Nebraska =

Village in Valley County, Nebraska, United States

- Village
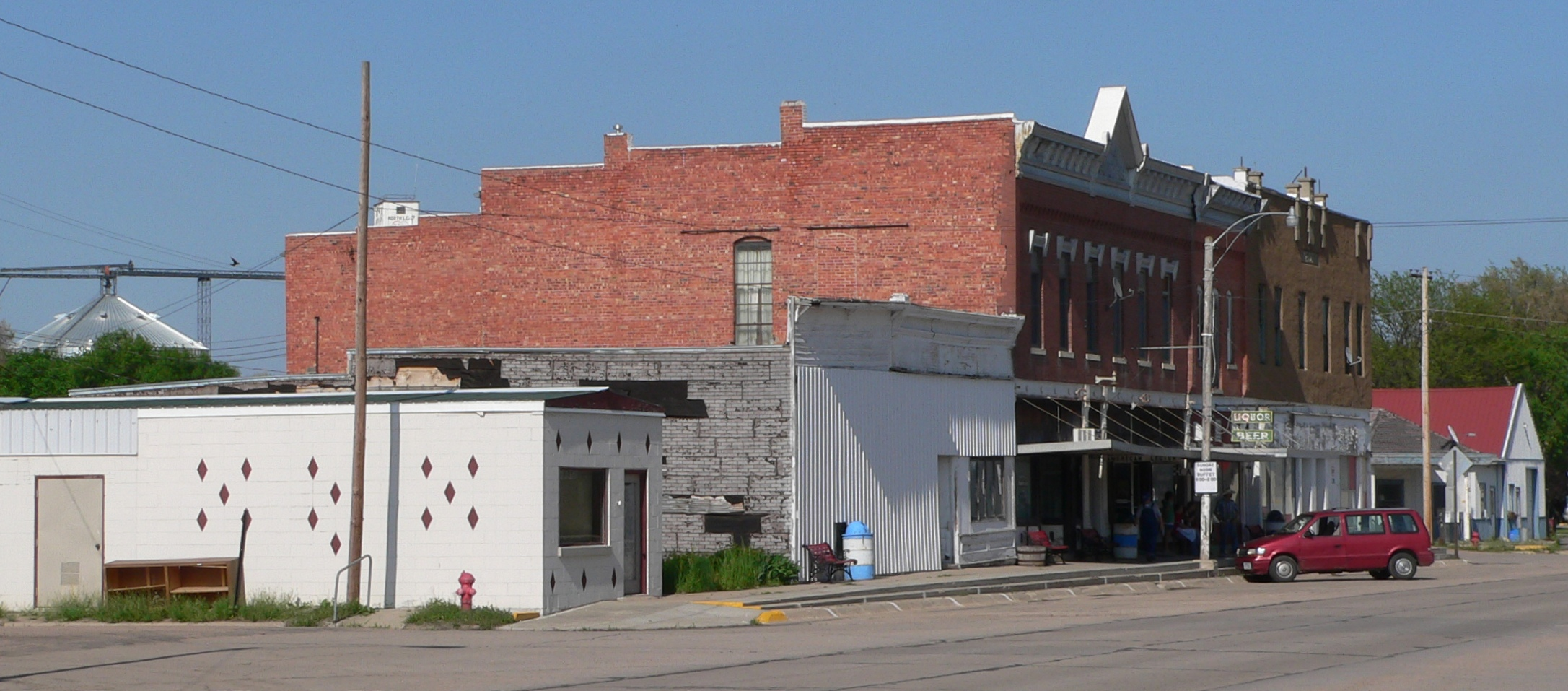
- Downtown North Loup: north side of 1st Street

- Location of North Loup, Nebraska
- Coordinates: 41°29′44″N 98°46′22″W
- Country: United States
- State: Nebraska
- County: Valley

Area
  - Total: 0.41 sq mi (1.06 km^{2})
  - Land: 0.41 sq mi (1.06 km^{2})
  - Water: 0 sq mi (0.00 km^{2})
- Elevation: 1,965 ft (599 m)

Population (2020)
  - Total: 254
  - Density: 620.3/sq mi (239.51/km^{2})
- Time zone: UTC-6 (Central (CST))
  - Summer (DST): UTC-5 (CDT)
- ZIP code: 68859
- Area code: 308
- FIPS code: 31-34825
- GNIS feature ID: 2399519

North Loup is a village in North Loup Township, Valley County, Nebraska, United States. As of the 2020 census, its population was 254.

== History ==
In 1871, a party of Seventh Day Baptists from Wisconsin explored Valley County for settlement sites. In May 1872, they established a community near what is now North Loup. A post office and general store were established in 1873. In 1877, the town of North Loup was formally organized. The name was taken from the North Loup River, in whose valley the village lies.

In 1880, the Union Pacific Railroad completed a branch line from Grand Island to St. Paul, shortening the distance from the Valley County settlements to rail transport. In the following year, North Loup and Ord voted to issue $9,000 worth of bonds to help subsidize the railroad's extension through the two towns. The rail connection from St. Paul to North Loup was completed in 1882.

The arrival of the railroad prompted a boom in North Loup, which lasted for some four years. In the course of a single year, the village's population doubled, to two hundred residents. The boom ended in 1886, when the railway line was finally completed to the county seat of Ord.

From about 1877 to 1890, the Loup valley enjoyed a series of wet years that attracted a wave of settlers, who homesteaded even marginal agricultural land. In 1890, this ended with a series of drought years, lasting until about 1896. During this time, the valley's farmers experimented with alternative crops, among them winter wheat and alfalfa. In the North Loup valley, one such crop was popcorn. The experiment was successful; in 1901, North Loup celebrated its first "Popcorn Days" celebration, which continues to be held every August.

The village grew rapidly from about 1900 to 1920. By 1915, there were over 600 residents. Growth continued, albeit very slowly, in the 1920s; the maximum population of 643 was reached in 1930. After World War II, the population declined; in 1959, the village was no longer able to support its own school district, which was merged with that of Scotia, in neighboring Greeley County.

=== 2010 flood ===
On June 12, 2010, the privately owned Bredthauer Dam, located 4.5 miles (7.2 km) upstream from North Loup on Mira Creek, broke due to heavy rain, flooding rural Valley County. Major flooding occurred in North Loup, with water "eight inches deep and running down Main Street." The village was evacuated for the duration of the flood.

== Demographics ==
Historical population
Census	Pop.	Note	%±
1890	386		—
1900	420		8.8%
1910	519		23.6%
1920	637		22.7%
1930	657		3.1%
1940	567		−13.7%
1950	526		−7.2%
1960	453		−13.9%
1970	441		−2.6%
1980	405		−8.2%
1990	361		−10.9%
2000	339		−6.1%
2010	297		−12.4%
2020	254		−14.5%
U.S. Decennial Census

=== 2010 census ===
As of the census of 2010, there were 297 people, 154 households, and 85 families residing in the village. The population density was 724.4 inhabitants per square mile (279.7/km^{2}). There were 191 housing units at an average density of 465.9 per square mile (179.9/km^{2}). The racial makeup of the village was 97.6% White, 0.3% Asian, 0.7% from other races, and 1.3% from two or more races. Hispanic or Latino of any race were 1.0% of the population.

There were 154 households, of which 20.8% had children under the age of 18 living with them, 46.8% were married couples living together, 4.5% had a female householder with no husband present, 3.9% had a male householder with no wife present, and 44.8% were non-families. 42.2% of all households were made up of individuals, and 24% had someone living alone who was 65 years of age or older. The average household size was 1.93 and the average family size was 2.58.

The median age in the village was 51.9 years. 14.8% of residents were under the age of 18; 5.6% were between the ages of 18 and 24; 14.8% were from 25 to 44; 32.6% were from 45 to 64; and 32% were 65 years of age or older. The gender makeup of the village was 48.8% male and 51.2% female.

=== 2000 census ===
As of the census of 2000, there were 339 people, 159 households, and 83 families residing in the village. The population density was 823.8 inhabitants per square mile (318.1/km^{2}). There were 192 housing units at an average density of 466.6 per square mile (180.2/km^{2}). The racial makeup of the village was 97.35% White, 1.77% from other races, and 0.88% from two or more races. Hispanic or Latino of any race were 2.36% of the population.

There were 159 households, out of which 22.0% had children under the age of 18 living with them, 49.7% were married couples living together, 1.9% had a female householder with no husband present, and 47.2% were non-families. 42.8% of all households were made up of individuals, and 26.4% had someone living alone who was 65 years of age or older. The average household size was 2.13 and the average family size was 3.06.

In the village, the population was spread out, with 24.8% under the age of 18, 2.9% from 18 to 24, 20.1% from 25 to 44, 20.6% from 45 to 64, and 31.6% who were 65 years of age or older. The median age was 46 years. For every 100 females, there were 97.1 males. For every 100 females age 18 and over, there were 99.2 males.

As of 2000 the median income for a household in the village was $20,288, and the median income for a family was $25,750. Males had a median income of $21,750 versus $15,000 for females. The per capita income for the village was $12,672. About 22.1% of families and 24.1% of the population were below the poverty line, including 33.3% of those under age 18 and 21.3% of those age 65 or over.

== Geography ==
According to the United States Census Bureau, the village has a total area of 0.41 square miles (1.06 km^{2}), all land.

=== Climate ===
Climate data for North Loup, Nebraska (1991–2020 normals, extremes 1895–present)
Month	Jan	Feb	Mar	Apr	May	Jun	Jul	Aug	Sep	Oct	Nov	Dec	Year
Record high °F (°C)	75 (24)	78 (26)	92 (33)	103 (39)	105 (41)	113 (45)	114 (46)	111 (44)	108 (42)	98 (37)	89 (32)	81 (27)	114 (46)
Mean maximum °F (°C)	60.2 (15.7)	64.3 (17.9)	74.8 (23.8)	84.6 (29.2)	88.9 (31.6)	92.9 (33.8)	95.9 (35.5)	94.6 (34.8)	89.7 (32.1)	85.5 (29.7)	73.2 (22.9)	61.0 (16.1)	97.0 (36.1)
Mean daily maximum °F (°C)	35.0 (1.7)	39.2 (4.0)	51.2 (10.7)	62.0 (16.7)	71.5 (21.9)	81.1 (27.3)	85.1 (29.5)	82.9 (28.3)	76.6 (24.8)	63.5 (17.5)	49.1 (9.5)	37.4 (3.0)	61.2 (16.2)
Daily mean °F (°C)	22.8 (−5.1)	26.4 (−3.1)	37.3 (2.9)	47.6 (8.7)	58.4 (14.7)	68.5 (20.3)	72.9 (22.7)	70.7 (21.5)	62.7 (17.1)	49.7 (9.8)	36.0 (2.2)	25.6 (−3.6)	48.2 (9.0)
Mean daily minimum °F (°C)	10.6 (−11.9)	13.7 (−10.2)	23.4 (−4.8)	33.3 (0.7)	45.2 (7.3)	55.9 (13.3)	60.7 (15.9)	58.5 (14.7)	48.9 (9.4)	36.0 (2.2)	22.9 (−5.1)	13.7 (−10.2)	35.2 (1.8)
Mean minimum °F (°C)	−9.4 (−23.0)	−5.7 (−20.9)	5.1 (−14.9)	19.3 (−7.1)	32.6 (0.3)	44.9 (7.2)	51.5 (10.8)	49.3 (9.6)	34.3 (1.3)	19.3 (−7.1)	5.1 (−14.9)	−2.3 (−19.1)	−13.8 (−25.4)
Record low °F (°C)	−35 (−37)	−33 (−36)	−21 (−29)	2 (−17)	20 (−7)	31 (−1)	35 (2)	34 (1)	20 (−7)	4 (−16)	−13 (−25)	−29 (−34)	−35 (−37)
Average precipitation inches (mm)	0.54 (14)	0.70 (18)	1.48 (38)	2.94 (75)	3.81 (97)	4.43 (113)	3.28 (83)	2.86 (73)	2.20 (56)	2.05 (52)	0.93 (24)	0.76 (19)	25.98 (660)
Average snowfall inches (cm)	6.6 (17)	6.2 (16)	5.5 (14)	2.6 (6.6)	0.0 (0.0)	0.0 (0.0)	0.0 (0.0)	0.0 (0.0)	0.0 (0.0)	1.3 (3.3)	3.3 (8.4)	5.4 (14)	30.9 (78)
Average precipitation days (≥ 0.01 in)	3.6	3.9	5.2	7.8	9.7	9.8	7.8	6.8	5.5	5.4	4.2	3.5	73.2
Average snowy days (≥ 0.1 in)	2.9	2.6	1.5	0.9	0.0	0.0	0.0	0.0	0.0	0.5	1.5	2.5	12.4
Source: NOAA

== See also ==
- List of municipalities in Nebraska
