= Elyria, Nebraska =

Village in Valley County, Nebraska, United States

- Village
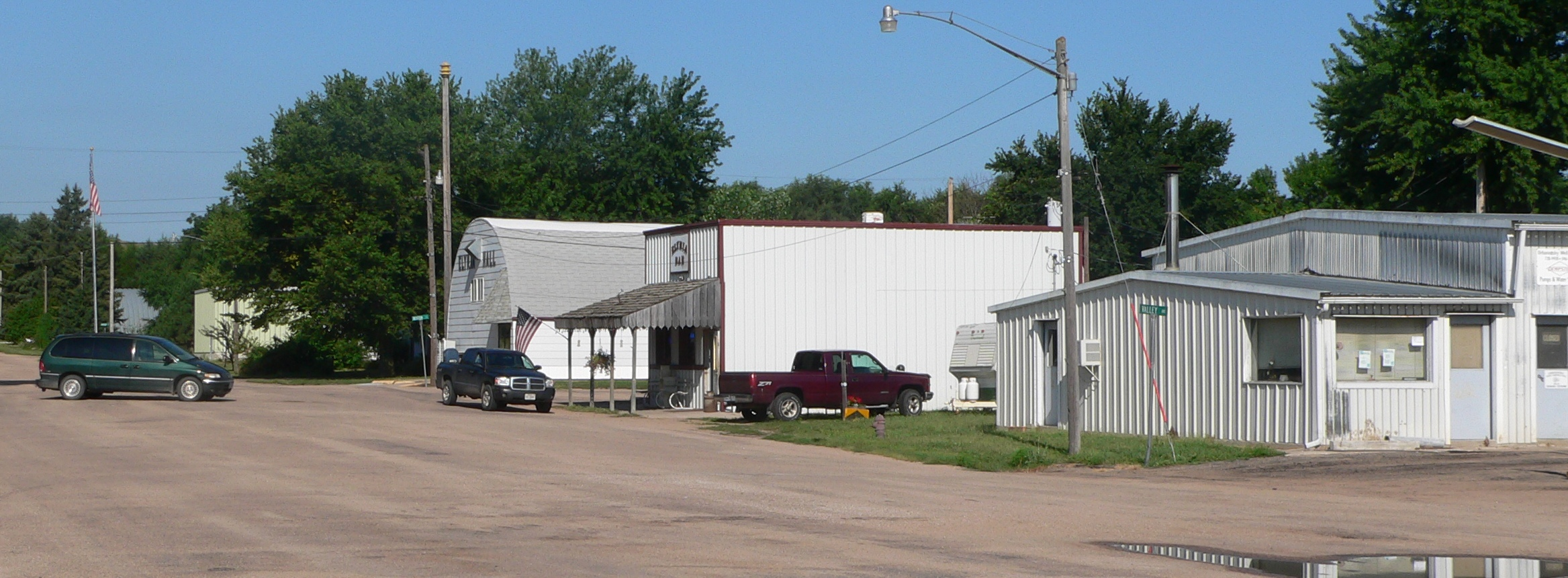
- Downtown Elyria

- Location of Elyria, Nebraska
- Coordinates: 41°40′48″N 99°00′19″W
- Country: United States
- State: Nebraska
- County: Valley

Area
  - Total: 0.27 sq mi (0.69 km^{2})
  - Land: 0.27 sq mi (0.69 km^{2})
  - Water: 0 sq mi (0.00 km^{2})
- Elevation: 2,103 ft (641 m)

Population (2020)
  - Total: 50
  - Density: 187.9/sq mi (72.53/km^{2})
- Time zone: UTC-6 (Central (CST))
  - Summer (DST): UTC-5 (CDT)
- ZIP code: 68837
- Area code: 308
- FIPS code: 31-15605
- GNIS feature ID: 2398824

Elyria is a village in Valley County, Nebraska, United States. As of the 2020 census, Elyria had a population of 50.

== History ==
Elyria was originally named Eldon and was established in 1888 when the railroad was extended to the area. It was later renamed Elyria after discovering that another town named Eldon already existed in Nebraska.

== Geography ==
According to the United States Census Bureau, the village has a total area of 0.27 square miles (0.70 km^{2}), all of it land.

== Demographics ==
Historical population
Census	Pop.	Note	%±
1940	77		—
1950	87		13.0%
1960	89		2.3%
1970	55		−38.2%
1980	62		12.7%
1990	61		−1.6%
2000	54		−11.5%
2010	51		−5.6%
2020	50		−2.0%
U.S. Decennial Census

=== 2010 census ===
As of the census of 2010, there were 51 people, 24 households, and 15 families residing in the village. The population density was 188.9 inhabitants per square mile (72.9/km^{2}). There were 31 housing units at an average density of 114.8 per square mile (44.3/km^{2}). The racial makeup of the village was 100.0% White.

There were 24 households, of which 20.8% had children under the age of 18 living with them, 58.3% were married couples living together, 4.2% had a female householder with no husband present, and 37.5% were non-families. 33.3% of all households were made up of individuals, and 16.7% had someone living alone who was 65 years of age or older. The average household size was 2.13 and the average family size was 2.73.

The median age in the village was 48.6 years. 15.7% of residents were under the age of 18; 7.9% were between the ages of 18 and 24; 17.6% were from 25 to 44; 33.3% were from 45 to 64; and 25.5% were 65 years of age or older. The gender makeup of the village was 47.1% male and 52.9% female.

=== 2000 census ===
As of the census of 2000, there were 54 people, 26 households, and 15 families residing in the village. The population density was 208.1 inhabitants per square mile (80.3/km^{2}). There were 31 housing units at an average density of 119.4 per square mile (46.1/km^{2}). The racial makeup of the village was 100.00% White.

There were 26 households, out of which 19.2% had children under the age of 18 living with them, 53.8% were married couples living together, 3.8% had a female householder with no husband present, and 42.3% were non-families. 42.3% of all households were made up of individuals, and 15.4% had someone living alone who was 65 years of age or older. The average household size was 2.08 and the average family size was 2.60.

In the village, the population was spread out, with 24.1% under the age of 18, 25.9% from 25 to 44, 31.5% from 45 to 64, and 18.5% who were 65 years of age or older. The median age was 46 years. For every 100 females, there were 86.2 males. For every 100 females age 18 and over, there were 86.4 males.

As of 2000 the median income for a household in the village was $18,750, and the median income for a family was $26,250. Males had a median income of $21,875 versus $19,375 for females. The per capita income for the village was $10,695. There were 16.7% of families and 16.9% of the population living below the poverty line, including no under eighteens and 15.4% of those over 64.

== See also ==
- List of municipalities in Nebraska
