= Valley County, Nebraska =

County in Nebraska, United States

- County
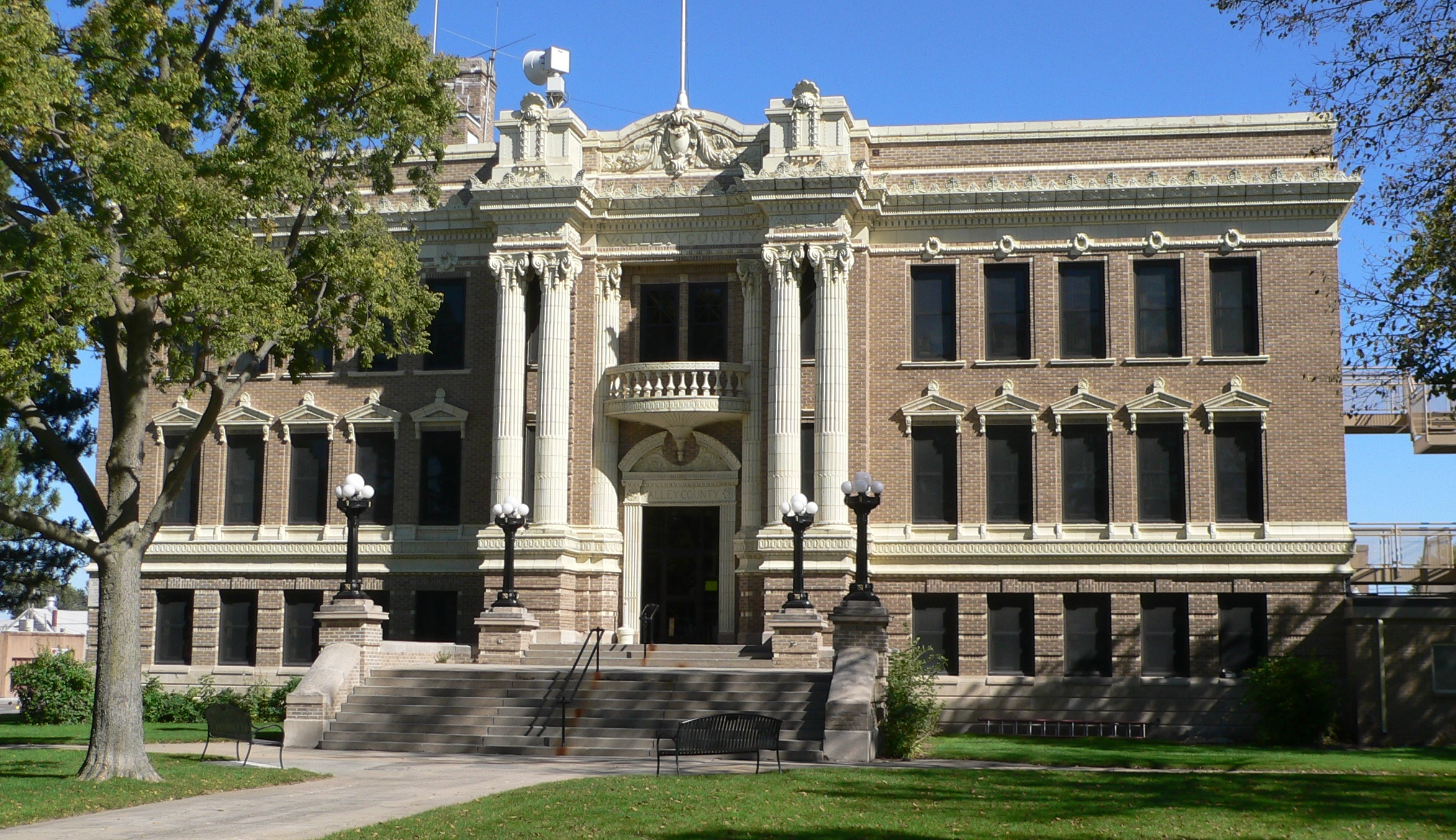
- Valley County Courthouse in Ord

- Location within the U.S. state of Nebraska
- Coordinates: 41°34′N 98°59′W
- Country: United States
- State: Nebraska
- Founded: 1871 (formed); 1873 (organized)
- Seat: Ord
- Largest city: Ord

Area
  - Total: 570 sq mi (1,500 km^{2})
  - Land: 568 sq mi (1,470 km^{2})
  - Water: 2.4 sq mi (6.2 km^{2}) 0.4%

Population (2020)
  - Total: 4,059
  - Estimate (2025): 4,094 ▲
  - Density: 7.15/sq mi (2.76/km^{2})
- Time zone: UTC−6 (Central)
  - Summer (DST): UTC−5 (CDT)
- Congressional district: 3rd
- Website: valleycountyne.gov

Valley County is a county in the U.S. state of Nebraska. As of the 2020 United States census, the population was 4,059. Its county seat is Ord.

In the Nebraska license plate system, Valley County is represented by the prefix 47 (it had the 47th-largest number of vehicles registered in the county when the license plate system was established in 1922).

== History ==
Valley County was formed in 1871 and organized in 1873. Its name derives from the local terrain: much of the county consists of valley land lying between the North and Middle Loup Rivers.

On June 12, 2010, the privately owned Bredthauer Dam broke due to heavy rain, flooding rural Valley County and the village of North Loup. Major flooding occurred in the village, with water "eight inches deep and running down Main Street." North Loup was evacuated for the flood's duration.

== Geography ==
The North Loup River flows southeastward through the upper portion of the county, while the Middle Loup River runs southeastward through the lower portion. The terrain consists of rolling hills. The flat river valleys are largely dedicated to agriculture, with some center pivot irrigation employed. The county has an area of 570 square miles (1,500 km^{2}), of which 568 square miles (1,470 km^{2}) is land and 2.4 square miles (6.2 km^{2}) (0.4%) is water.

=== Major highways ===
- Nebraska Highway 11
- Nebraska Highway 22
- Nebraska Highway 58
- Nebraska Highway 70

=== Protected area ===
- Fort Hartsuff State Historical Park
- Scotia Canal State Wildlife Management Area

=== Adjacent counties ===
- Wheeler County – northeast
- Greeley County – east
- Sherman County – south
- Custer County – west
- Garfield County – north

== Demographics ==
Historical population
Census	Pop.	Note	%±
1880	2,324		—
1890	7,092		205.2%
1900	7,339		3.5%
1910	9,480		29.2%
1920	9,823		3.6%
1930	9,533		−3.0%
1940	8,163		−14.4%
1950	7,252		−11.2%
1960	6,590		−9.1%
1970	5,783		−12.2%
1980	5,633		−2.6%
1990	5,169		−8.2%
2000	4,647		−10.1%
2010	4,260		−8.3%
2020	4,059		−4.7%
2025 (est.)	4,094	▲	0.9%
US Decennial Census; 1790-1960 1900-1990; 1990-2000 2010

=== 2020 census ===
As of the 2020 census, the county had a population of 4,059. The median age was 44.9 years. 23.6% of residents were under the age of 18 and 25.1% of residents were 65 years of age or older. For every 100 females there were 98.1 males, and for every 100 females age 18 and over there were 98.1 males age 18 and over.

The racial makeup of the county was 95.2% White, 0.4% Black or African American, 0.2% American Indian and Alaska Native, 0.2% Asian, 0.2% Native Hawaiian and Pacific Islander, 1.1% from some other race, and 2.6% from two or more races. Hispanic or Latino residents of any race comprised 2.9% of the population.

0.0% of residents lived in urban areas, while 100.0% lived in rural areas.

There were 1,806 households in the county, of which 25.5% had children under the age of 18 living with them and 22.2% had a female householder with no spouse or partner present. About 35.2% of all households were made up of individuals and 18.0% had someone living alone who was 65 years of age or older.

There were 2,104 housing units, of which 14.2% were vacant. Among occupied housing units, 72.5% were owner-occupied and 27.5% were renter-occupied. The homeowner vacancy rate was 2.9% and the rental vacancy rate was 11.4%.

=== 2000 census ===
As of the 2000 United States census, there were 4,647 people, 1,965 households, and 1,298 families in the county. The population density was 8 people per square mile (3.1 people/km^{2}). There were 2,273 housing units at an average density of 4 units per square mile (1.5/km^{2}).

The racial makeup of the county was 98.15% White, 0.15% Black or African American, 0.32% Native American, 0.11% Asian, 0.06% Pacific Islander, 0.80% from other races, and 0.41% from two or more races. 1.61% of the population were Hispanic or Latino of any race.

There were 1,965 households, out of which 28.00% had children under the age of 18 living with them, 58.70% were married couples living together, 5.10% had a female householder with no husband present, and 33.90% were non-families. 31.00% of all households were made up of individuals, and 17.90% had someone living alone who was 65 years of age or older. The average household size was 2.32 and the average family size was 2.93.

The county population contained 24.70% under the age of 18, 4.80% from 18 to 24, 22.60% from 25 to 44, 23.90% from 45 to 64, and 24.00% who were 65 years of age or older. The median age was 44 years. For every 100 females there were 91.70 males. For every 100 females age 18 and over, there were 90.50 males.

The median income for a household in the county was $27,926, and the median income for a family was $35,571. Males had a median income of $25,224 versus $17,217 for females. The per capita income for the county was $14,996. About 10.10% of families and 12.80% of the population were below the poverty line, including 16.30% of those under age 18 and 12.70% of those age 65 or over.

== Communities ==
=== City ===
- Ord (county seat)

=== Villages ===
- Arcadia
- Elyria
- North Loup

=== Unincorporated communities ===
- Olean
- Sumter

=== Townships ===
- Arcadia
- Davis Creek
- Elyria
- Enterprise
- Eureka
- Geranium
- Independent
- Liberty
- Michigan
- Noble
- North Loup
- Ord
- Springdale
- Vinton
- Yale

== Politics ==
Valley County voters are strongly Republican. In only one national election since 1916 has the county selected the Democratic Party candidate.

United States presidential election results for Valley County, Nebraska
Year	Republican		Democratic		Third party(ies)	
Year	No.	%	No.	%	No.	%
1900	810	47.40%	864	50.56%	35	2.05%
1904	1,133	63.94%	219	12.36%	420	23.70%
1908	1,040	48.46%	1,045	48.70%	61	2.84%
1912	552	26.73%	788	38.16%	725	35.11%
1916	840	36.44%	1,388	60.22%	77	3.34%
1920	1,935	64.80%	912	30.54%	139	4.66%
1924	2,014	55.04%	802	21.92%	843	23.04%
1928	2,768	69.27%	1,205	30.16%	23	0.58%
1932	1,584	39.04%	2,400	59.16%	73	1.80%
1936	2,033	49.65%	1,960	47.86%	102	2.49%
1940	2,449	60.63%	1,590	39.37%	0	0.00%
1944	2,096	58.70%	1,475	41.30%	0	0.00%
1948	1,670	54.66%	1,385	45.34%	0	0.00%
1952	2,630	71.92%	1,027	28.08%	0	0.00%
1956	2,189	66.78%	1,089	33.22%	0	0.00%
1960	2,045	62.10%	1,248	37.90%	0	0.00%
1964	1,657	51.75%	1,545	48.25%	0	0.00%
1968	1,759	64.41%	793	29.04%	179	6.55%
1972	2,011	72.29%	771	27.71%	0	0.00%
1976	1,587	57.31%	1,042	37.63%	140	5.06%
1980	2,101	71.73%	655	22.36%	173	5.91%
1984	2,055	73.21%	739	26.33%	13	0.46%
1988	1,604	64.08%	873	34.88%	26	1.04%
1992	1,173	45.29%	716	27.64%	701	27.07%
1996	1,346	56.27%	758	31.69%	288	12.04%
2000	1,610	71.14%	583	25.76%	70	3.09%
2004	1,801	75.32%	564	23.59%	26	1.09%
2008	1,657	68.39%	706	29.14%	60	2.48%
2012	1,657	75.49%	498	22.69%	40	1.82%
2016	1,780	80.73%	339	15.37%	86	3.90%
2020	1,901	81.10%	412	17.58%	31	1.32%
2024	1,872	81.36%	403	17.51%	26	1.13%

== See also ==
- National Register of Historic Places listings in Valley County, Nebraska
