= List of Nebraska townships =

Nebraska townships
- Map of the 460 townships in Nebraska
- Category: Lower-level administrative division
- Location: Nebraska
- Created: 1867
- Number: 460
- Populations: 10 (Spring Creek Township) – 3,264 (Columbus Township)
- Areas: 8.9 square miles (23 km^{2}) (North Frankfort Township) – 181.2 square miles (469 km^{2}) (Hayes Township)
- Government: Township government

The U.S. state of Nebraska is divided into 93 counties, 25 of which are divided into a total of 460 townships. 63 are divided into precincts where there is no township government. Four counties have neither a township nor a precinct subdivision: Banner, Hooker, Thomas, and Arthur. Thomas County was still subdivided into three precincts as of the Census 2000. Townships and precinct as county subdivisions are listed in a 1970 census document.

Township	County
Ayr	Adams
Blaine	Adams
Cottonwood	Adams
Denver	Adams
Hanover	Adams
Highland	Adams
Juniata	Adams
Kenesaw	Adams
Little Blue	Adams
Logan	Adams
Roseland	Adams
Silver Lake	Adams
Verona	Adams
Wanda	Adams
West Blue	Adams
Zero	Adams
Bazile	Antelope
Blaine	Antelope
Burnett	Antelope
Cedar	Antelope
Clearwater	Antelope
Crawford	Antelope
Custer	Antelope
Eden	Antelope
Elgin	Antelope
Ellsworth	Antelope
Elm	Antelope
Frenchtown	Antelope
Garfield	Antelope
Grant	Antelope
Lincoln	Antelope
Logan	Antelope
Neligh	Antelope
Oakdale	Antelope
Ord	Antelope
Royal	Antelope
Sherman	Antelope
Stanton	Antelope
Verdigris	Antelope
Willow	Antelope
Basin	Boyd
Bristow	Boyd
Bush	Boyd
Butte	Boyd
Lynch	Boyd
McCulley	Boyd
Morton	Boyd
Mullen	Boyd
Spencer	Boyd
Armada	Buffalo
Beaver	Buffalo
Cedar	Buffalo
Center	Buffalo
Cherry Creek	Buffalo
Collins	Buffalo
Divide	Buffalo
Elm Creek	Buffalo
Gardner	Buffalo
Garfield	Buffalo
Gibbon	Buffalo
Grant	Buffalo
Harrison	Buffalo
Logan	Buffalo
Loup	Buffalo
Odessa	Buffalo
Platte	Buffalo
Riverdale	Buffalo
Rusco	Buffalo
Sartoria	Buffalo
Schneider	Buffalo
Scott	Buffalo
Sharon	Buffalo
Shelton	Buffalo
Thornton	Buffalo
Valley	Buffalo
Arizona	Burt
Bell Creek	Burt
Craig	Burt
Decatur	Burt
Everett	Burt
Logan	Burt
Oakland	Burt
Pershing	Burt
Quinnebaugh	Burt
Riverside	Burt
Silver Creek	Burt
Summit	Burt
Alexis	Butler
Bone Creek	Butler
Center	Butler
Franklin	Butler
Linwood	Butler
Oak Creek	Butler
Olive	Butler
Platte	Butler
Plum Creek	Butler
Read	Butler
Reading	Butler
Richardson	Butler
Savannah	Butler
Skull Creek	Butler
Summit	Butler
Ulysses	Butler
Union	Butler
Edgar	Clay
Eldorado	Clay
Fairfield	Clay
Glenvil	Clay
Harvard	Clay
Inland	Clay
Leicester	Clay
Lewis	Clay
Logan	Clay
Lone Tree	Clay
Lynn	Clay
Marshall	Clay
School Creek	Clay
Sheridan	Clay
Spring Ranch	Clay
Sutton	Clay
Bancroft	Cuming
Beemer	Cuming
Bismark	Cuming
Blaine	Cuming
Cleveland	Cuming
Cuming	Cuming
Elkhorn	Cuming
Garfield	Cuming
Grant	Cuming
Lincoln	Cuming
Logan	Cuming
Monterey	Cuming
Neligh	Cuming
Sherman	Cuming
St. Charles	Cuming
Wisner	Cuming
Algernon	Custer
Ansley	Custer
Arnold	Custer
Berwyn	Custer
Broken Bow	Custer
Cliff	Custer
Comstock	Custer
Corner	Custer
Custer	Custer
Delight	Custer
Douglas Grove	Custer
East Custer	Custer
Elim	Custer
Elk Creek	Custer
Garfield	Custer
Grant	Custer
Hayes	Custer
Kilfoil	Custer
Lillian	Custer
Loup	Custer
Milburn	Custer
Myrtle	Custer
Ryno	Custer
Sargent	Custer
Spring Creek	Custer
Triumph	Custer
Victoria	Custer
Wayne	Custer
West Union	Custer
Westerville	Custer
Wood River	Custer
Clark	Dixon
Concord	Dixon
Daily	Dixon
Emerson	Dixon
Galena	Dixon
Hooker	Dixon
Logan	Dixon
Newcastle	Dixon
Ottercreek	Dixon
Ponca	Dixon
Silvercreek	Dixon
Springbank	Dixon
Wakefield	Dixon
Cotterell	Dodge
Cuming	Dodge
Elkhorn	Dodge
Everett	Dodge
Hooper	Dodge
Logan	Dodge
Maple	Dodge
Nickerson	Dodge
Pebble	Dodge
Platte	Dodge
Pleasant Valley	Dodge
Ridgeley	Dodge
Union	Dodge
Webster	Dodge
Belle Prairie	Fillmore
Bennett	Fillmore
Bryant	Fillmore
Chelsea	Fillmore
Exeter-Fairmont Consolidated	Fillmore
Franklin	Fillmore
Geneva	Fillmore
Glengary	Fillmore
Grafton	Fillmore
Hamilton	Fillmore
Liberty	Fillmore
Madison	Fillmore
Momence	Fillmore
Stanton	Fillmore
West Blue	Fillmore
Antelope	Franklin
Ash Grove	Franklin
East Bloomington	Franklin
Grant	Franklin
Lincoln	Franklin
Macon	Franklin
Marion	Franklin
North Franklin	Franklin
Salem	Franklin
Turkey Creek	Franklin
Washington	Franklin
Adams	Gage
Barneston	Gage
Blakely	Gage
Blue Springs-Wymore	Gage
Clatonia	Gage
Elm	Gage
Filley	Gage
Glenwood	Gage
Grant	Gage
Hanover	Gage
Highland	Gage
Holt	Gage
Hooker	Gage
Island Grove	Gage
Liberty	Gage
Lincoln	Gage
Logan	Gage
Midland	Gage
Nemaha	Gage
Paddock	Gage
Riverside	Gage
Rockford	Gage
Sherman	Gage
Sicily	Gage
Alda	Hall
Cameron	Hall
Center	Hall
Doniphan	Hall
Harrison	Hall
Jackson	Hall
Lake	Hall
Martin	Hall
Mayfield	Hall
Prairie Creek	Hall
South Loup	Hall
South Platte	Hall
Washington	Hall
Wood River	Hall
Albany	Harlan
Alma	Harlan
Antelope	Harlan
Eldorado	Harlan
Emerson	Harlan
Fairfield	Harlan
Mullally	Harlan
Orleans	Harlan
Prairie Dog	Harlan
Republican City	Harlan
Reuben	Harlan
Sappa	Harlan
Scandinavia	Harlan
Spring Grove	Harlan
Turkey Creek	Harlan
Washington	Harlan
Antelope	Holt
Atkinson	Holt
Belle	Holt
Chambers	Holt
Cleveland	Holt
Coleman	Holt
Conley	Holt
Deloit	Holt
Dustin	Holt
Emmet	Holt
Ewing	Holt
Fairview	Holt
Francis	Holt
Golden	Holt
Grattan	Holt
Green Valley	Holt
Holt Creek	Holt
Inman	Holt
Iowa	Holt
Josie	Holt
Lake	Holt
McClure	Holt
Paddock	Holt
Pleasant View	Holt
Rock Falls	Holt
Sand Creek	Holt
Saratoga	Holt
Scott	Holt
Shamrock	Holt
Sheridan	Holt
Shields	Holt
Steel Creek	Holt
Stuart	Holt
Swan	Holt
Verdigris	Holt
Willowdale	Holt
Wyoming	Holt
Blaine	Kearney
Cosmo	Kearney
Eaton	Kearney
Grant	Kearney
Hayes	Kearney
Liberty	Kearney
Lincoln	Kearney
Logan	Kearney
Lowell	Kearney
May	Kearney
Mirage	Kearney
Newark	Kearney
Oneida	Kearney
Sherman	Kearney
Addison	Knox
Bohemia	Knox
Central	Knox
Cleveland	Knox
Columbia	Knox
Creighton	Knox
Dolphin	Knox
Dowling	Knox
Eastern	Knox
Frankfort	Knox
Harrison	Knox
Herrick	Knox
Hill	Knox
Jefferson	Knox
Lincoln	Knox
Logan	Knox
Miller	Knox
Morton	Knox
Niobrara	Knox
North Frankfort	Knox
Peoria	Knox
Raymond	Knox
Spade	Knox
Sparta	Knox
Union	Knox
Valley	Knox
Verdigre	Knox
Walnut Grove	Knox
Washington	Knox
Western	Knox
Buda	Lancaster
Centerville	Lancaster
Denton	Lancaster
Elk	Lancaster
Garfield	Lancaster
Grant	Lancaster
Highlands	Lancaster
Lancaster	Lancaster
Little Salt	Lancaster
Middle Creek	Lancaster
Mill	Lancaster
Nemaha	Lancaster
North Bluff	Lancaster
Oak	Lancaster
Olive Branch	Lancaster
Panama	Lancaster
Rock Creek	Lancaster
Saltillo	Lancaster
South Pass	Lancaster
Stevens Creek	Lancaster
Stockton	Lancaster
Waverly	Lancaster
West Lincoln	Lancaster
West Oak	Lancaster
Yankee Hill	Lancaster
Central	Merrick
Chapman	Merrick
Clarksville	Merrick
Lone Tree	Merrick
Loup	Merrick
Mead	Merrick
Midland	Merrick
Prairie Creek	Merrick
Prairie Island	Merrick
Silver Creek	Merrick
Vieregg	Merrick
Beaver	Nance
Cedar	Nance
Cottonwood	Nance
Council Creek	Nance
East Newman	Nance
Fullerton	Nance
Genoa	Nance
Loup Ferry	Nance
Prairie Creek	Nance
South Branch	Nance
Timber Creek	Nance
West Newman	Nance
Anderson	Phelps
Center	Phelps
Cottonwood	Phelps
Divide	Phelps
Garfield	Phelps
Industry-Rock Falls	Phelps
Laird	Phelps
Lake	Phelps
Prairie	Phelps
Sheridan	Phelps
Union	Phelps
Westmark	Phelps
Westside	Phelps
Williamsburg	Phelps
Bismark	Platte
Burrows	Platte
Butler	Platte
Columbus	Platte
Creston	Platte
Grand Prairie	Platte
Granville	Platte
Humphrey	Platte
Joliet	Platte
Lost Creek	Platte
Loup	Platte
Monroe	Platte
Oconee	Platte
Shell Creek	Platte
Sherman	Platte
St. Bernard	Platte
Walker	Platte
Woodville	Platte
Ashland	Saunders
Bohemia	Saunders
Center	Saunders
Chapman	Saunders
Chester	Saunders
Clear Creek	Saunders
Douglas	Saunders
Elk	Saunders
Green	Saunders
Leshara	Saunders
Marble	Saunders
Marietta	Saunders
Mariposa	Saunders
Morse Bluff	Saunders
Newman	Saunders
North Cedar	Saunders
Oak Creek	Saunders
Pohocco	Saunders
Richland	Saunders
Rock Creek	Saunders
South Cedar	Saunders
Stocking	Saunders
Union	Saunders
Wahoo	Saunders
Anderson	Thurston
Blackbird	Thurston
Bryan	Thurston
Dawes	Thurston
Flournoy	Thurston
Merry	Thurston
Omaha	Thurston
Pender	Thurston
Perry	Thurston
Thayer	Thurston
Winnebago	Thurston
Arcadia	Valley
Davis Creek	Valley
Elyria	Valley
Enterprise	Valley
Eureka	Valley
Geranium	Valley
Independent	Valley
Liberty	Valley
Michigan	Valley
Noble	Valley
North Loup	Valley
Ord	Valley
Springdale	Valley
Vinton	Valley
Yale	Valley

== See also ==
- Nebraska
- List of cities in Nebraska
- List of counties in Nebraska
