= List of place names in Nebraska of Native American origin =

This is a list of Native American place names in the U.S. state of Nebraska. These include state, county, townships, cities, towns, and villages.

== State ==
- Nebraska - The name of the state is derived from an Omaha name meaning "flat water." In the Omaha language the name is Nibthaska; ni, water, and bthaska, flat.

== Counties ==
- Red Willow - From the Dakota name "Caŋṡaṡa Wakpala", which literally means Red Osier Dogwood Creek; this shrub being abundant along its banks.
- Cheyenne
- Dakota
- Keya Paha County, Nebraska
- Loup - Named for the Skidi Pawnee, whose name means "wolf", which in French is loup.
- Nemaha
- Otoe
- Pawnee
- Sioux
- Keya Paha - Means "turtle hill", is descriptive of the small hills in its vicinity.

== Villages, towns and cities ==
- Anoka - A Dakota Indian word meaning "on both sides."
- Arapahoe
- Birdwood - A translation of the Dakota name Ziŋtka-c̣aŋ Wakpala (False Indigo Creek). False Indigo (Amorpha fruticosa), commonly grows along the stream and in Dakota is literally called "birdwood."
- Battle Creek - Named after a nearby stream where Nebraska volunteer militiamen were prepared to fight a battle against the Pawnee Indians that never happened.
- Barada - Named after Antoine Barada, a French-Omaha settler on the Nemaha Half-Breed Reservation.
- Blackbird - Blackbird is the English translation of the name Wash-ing-guhsah-ba, or Chief Blackbird of the Omahas who lived and died in the vicinity.
- Bone Creek Township, Butler County, Nebraska
- Brule - Named after the Brule tribe of the Teton Sioux.
- Council Creek Township, Nance County, Nebraska
- Elkhorn Township, Dodge County, Nebraska
- Fontenelle - Named after Omaha chief Logan Fontenelle.
- Hyannis - Named after Hyannis, Massachusetts, which was named after Iyannough, a sachem of the Cummaquid tribe.
- Iowa Township, Holt County, Nebraska
- Kenesaw Township, Adams County, Nebraska
- Leshara - Named after Chief Petalesharo.
- Lodgepole - Named after a nearby creek that is named after a literal translation of the Dakota name, Tushu Wakpala.
- Logan Township, Adams County, Nebraska
- Logan Township, Antelope County, Nebraska
- Logan Township, Buffalo County, Nebraska
- Logan Township, Burt County, Nebraska
- Logan Township, Clay County, Nebraska
- Logan Township, Cuming County, Nebraska
- Logan Township, Dixon County, Nebraska
- Logan Township, Dodge County, Nebraska
- Logan Township, Gage County, Nebraska
- Logan Township, Kearney County, Nebraska
- Logan Township, Knox County, Nebraska
- Loup Ferry Township, Nance County, Nebraska
- Loup Township, Buffalo County, Nebraska
- Loup Township, Custer County, Nebraska
- Loup Township, Merrick County, Nebraska
- Loup Township, Platte County, Nebraska
- Mankota - Mankota is from the Dakota Indian word Maḳaṭo, meaning "blue earth". Named for Mankato, Minnesota.
- Minatare - From the Hidatsa word mirita'ri, meaning "crosses the water."
- Monowi - Meaning "flower", this town was so named because there were so many wild flowers growing in the vicinity.
- Nehawka - An approximation to the Omaha and Otoe Indian name of a nearby creek meaning "rustling water."
- Nemaha - Named after the Nemaha River, based on an Otoe word meaning "swampy water."
- Niobrara - The Omaha and Ponca word for spreading water or spreading river.
- Oconee - Named for Oconee, Illinois. Oconee was the name of a Creek town.
- Oconto - A Menominee word meaning the "place of the pickerel." Named for Oconto, Wisconsin.
- Ogallala - named for the Oglala people.
- Omaha - Named for the Omaha people who lived nearby
- Oneida Township, Kearney County, Nebraska
- Osceola
- Ottercreek Township, Dixon County, Nebraska
- Leshara. Named after Petalesharo, a Pawnee chief.
- Platte Township, Buffalo County, Nebraska
- Platte Township, Butler County, Nebraska
- Platte Township, Dodge County, Nebraska
- Pohocco - A precinct in the northeastern part of Saunders county, the name derives from Pahuk, meaning headland or promontory, the Pawnee name of a prominent hill in the vicinity.
- Ponca
- Quinnebaugh Township, Burt County, Nebraska
- Red Cloud
- Rosalie - Named for Rosalie La Flesche, a daughter of Omaha chief Joseph La Flesche.
- Santee
- Sappa Township, Harlan County, Nebraska
- Saratoga Township, Holt County, Nebraska
- Sioux
- Skull Creek Township, Butler County, Nebraska
- St. Deroin - A ghost town on the former Nemaha Half-Breed Reservation founded by a French-Omaha settler who was killed near his trading post along the Missouri River.
- Tecumseh
- Tekamah - Located on the site of a historic Pawnee village, the surrounding hills were used for burying grounds and the highest point was used as a fire signal station. The origin of the name is not definitely known.
- Tonawanda - Named for Tonawanda, New York.
- Unidilla - An Iroquois word meaning "place of meeting." Named after Unadilla, New York.
- Venango - An eastern Native American name in reference to a figure found on a tree, carved by the Erie.
- Waco - Named after Waco, Texas, which is the name of one of the divisions of the Tawokoni whose village stood on the site of Waco, Texas.
- Wahoo
- Weeping Water is a translation of the French "L'Eau qui Pleure", and has an interesting Native American legend connected with its name.
- Winnebago
- Wyoming - Derived from a corrupted Delaware word meaning "large plains" or "extensive meadows."
- Wyoming Township, Holt County, Nebraska
- Yutan - Named for an Otoe chief.

=== Natural features ===
- Arikaree River
- Big Blue River
- Big Horn Mountain
- Dakota Formation
- Elkhorn River
- Fontenelle Forest
- Guide Rock
- Keya Paha River
- Lake Wanahoo
- Little Blue River
- Lodgepole Creek
- Medicine Creek
- Missouri River
- Missouri River Valley
- Niobrara National Scenic River
- Niobrara River
- Nishnabotna River
- North Platte River
- Ogallala Aquifer
- Oglala National Grassland
- Pahuk
- Platte River
- Red Willow Creek
- South Platte River
- Standing Bear Lake

=== Other places ===
- Fontenelle Boulevard
- Fontenelle's Post
- Hotel Fontenelle
- Logan Fontenelle Housing Project

== See also ==
- Native American tribes in Nebraska
- History of Nebraska
- French people in Nebraska

== Bibliography ==
- Fitzpatrick, Lilian Linder A.M. (1925) Nebraska Place-Names. Lincoln, NE: University of Nebraska Studies in Language, Literature, and Criticism. p 140.
- Fontenelle, Henry. (1885) Indian Names of Streams and Localities. Translations and reports of the Nebraska State Historical Society, vol. 1, p. 76, 1885.
- Gilmore, Melvin R. (1919) Some Indian Place Names in Nebraska. Nebraska State Historical Society, vol. 19, pp. 130–139.
