= Logan Township, Nebraska =

Logan Township, Nebraska may refer to the following places:

- Logan Township, Adams County, Nebraska
- Logan Township, Antelope County, Nebraska
- Logan Township, Buffalo County, Nebraska
- Logan Township, Burt County, Nebraska
- Logan Township, Clay County, Nebraska
- Logan Township, Cuming County, Nebraska
- Logan Township, Dixon County, Nebraska
- Logan Township, Dodge County, Nebraska
- Logan Township, Gage County, Nebraska
- Logan Township, Kearney County, Nebraska
- Logan Township, Knox County, Nebraska

== See also ==
- Logan Township (disambiguation)
