= Loup Township, Nebraska =

Loup Township, Nebraska may refer to the following places:

- Loup Township, Buffalo County, Nebraska
- Loup Township, Custer County, Nebraska
- Loup Township, Merrick County, Nebraska
- Loup Township, Platte County, Nebraska

== See also ==
- Loup Ferry Township, Nance County, Nebraska
- North Loup Township, Valley County, Nebraska
