= Lake Township, Nebraska =

Lake Township, Nebraska may refer to one of the following places in the U.S. state of Nebraska:

- Lake Township, Holt County, Nebraska
- Lake Township, Phelps County, Nebraska

== See also ==
- Silver Lake Township, Adams County, Nebraska
- Lake Township (disambiguation)
