= Deloit (disambiguation) =

Deloit may refer to:

- Deloit, Iowa, a city in Crawford County
- Deloit, Nebraska, an unincorporated community in Holt County
- Deloit Township, Holt County, Nebraska

== See also ==
- Deloitte, a professional services company
