= Rock Falls =

Rock Falls may refer to a place in the United States:

- Rock Falls, Illinois
- Rock Falls, Iowa
- Rock Falls, Wisconsin, a town in Lincoln County
- Rock Falls, Dunn County, Wisconsin, an unincorporated community in Dunn County
- Rock Falls Township, Holt County, Nebraska
- Industry-Rock Falls Township, Phelps County, Nebraska
