= Octavia, Nebraska =

Village in Nebraska, US

- Village
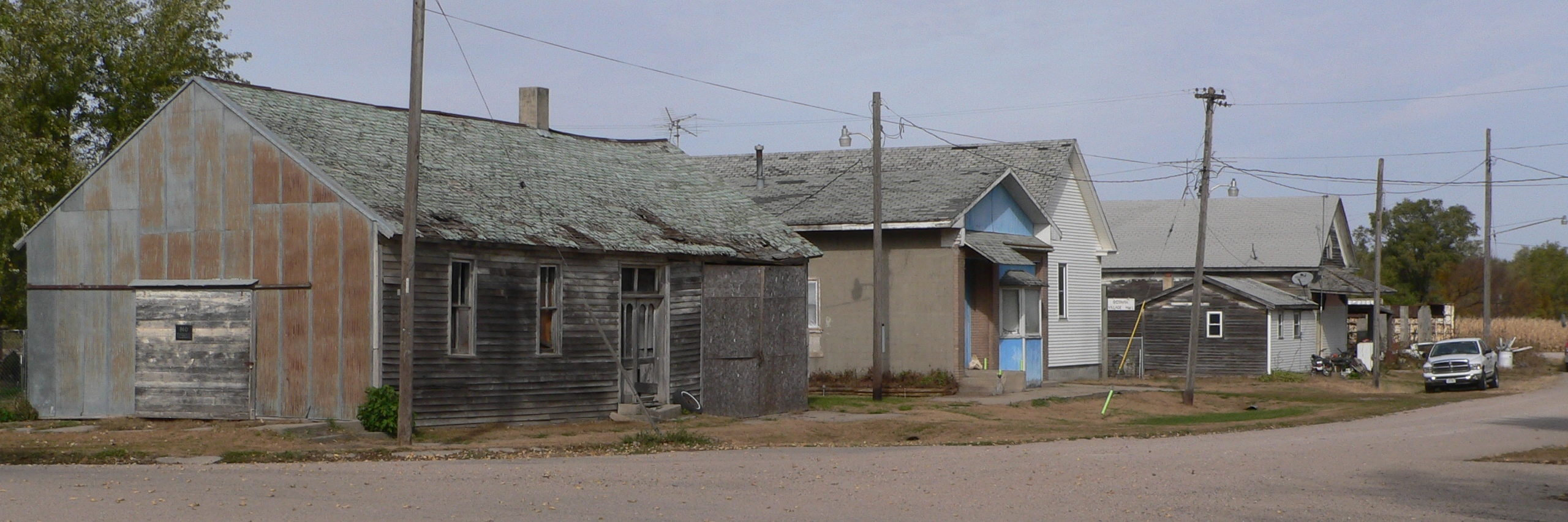
- Octavia, Nebraska Downtown

- Location of Octavia, Nebraska

- Location within Nebraska Location within the United States
- Coordinates: 41°20′51″N 97°03′32″W
- Country: United States
- State: Nebraska
- County: Butler
- Township: Bone Creek

Area
  - Total: 0.17 sq mi (0.43 km^{2})
  - Land: 0.17 sq mi (0.43 km^{2})
  - Water: 0 sq mi (0.00 km^{2})
- Elevation: 1,411 ft (430 m)

Population (2020)
  - Total: 107
  - Density: 651/sq mi (251.5/km^{2})
- Time zone: UTC-6 (Central (CST))
  - Summer (DST): UTC-5 (CDT)
- ZIP code: 68632
- Area code: 402
- FIPS code: 31-35700
- GNIS feature ID: 2399557

Octavia is a village in Butler County, Nebraska, United States. As of the 2020 census, Octavia had a population of 107.

== History ==
Octavia was established in 1887 when the Fremont, Elkhorn and Missouri Valley Railroad was extended to that point. It was named for Octavia Speltz, a pioneer settler.

A post office was established in Octavia in 1888, and remained in operation until it was discontinued in 1996.

== Geography ==
According to the United States Census Bureau, the village has a total area of 0.16 square miles (0.41 km^{2}), all land.

== Demographics ==
Historical population
| Census | Pop. | Note | %± |
|---|---|---|---|
| 1930 | 142 | | — |
| 1940 | 151 | | 6.3% |
| 1950 | 103 | | −31.8% |
| 1960 | 94 | | −8.7% |
| 1970 | 97 | | 3.2% |
| 1980 | 127 | | 30.9% |
| 1990 | 132 | | 3.9% |
| 2000 | 145 | | 9.8% |
| 2010 | 127 | | −12.4% |
| 2020 | 107 | | −15.7% |
U.S. Decennial Census

=== 2010 census ===
As of the census of 2010, there were 127 people, 49 households, and 33 families living in the village. The population density was 793.8 inhabitants per square mile (306.5/km^{2}). There were 53 housing units at an average density of 331.3 per square mile (127.9/km^{2}). The racial makeup of the village was 89.8% White, 7.1% from other races, and 3.1% from two or more races. Hispanic or Latino of any race were 13.4% of the population.

There were 49 households, of which 32.7% had children under the age of 18 living with them, 55.1% were married couples living together, 8.2% had a female householder with no husband present, 4.1% had a male householder with no wife present, and 32.7% were non-families. 30.6% of all households were made up of individuals, and 12.2% had someone living alone who was 65 years of age or older. The average household size was 2.59 and the average family size was 3.21.

The median age in the village was 35.9 years. 24.4% of residents were under the age of 18; 11.8% were between the ages of 18 and 24; 21.2% were from 25 to 44; 32.3% were from 45 to 64; and 10.2% were 65 years of age or older. The gender makeup of the village was 54.3% male and 45.7% female.

=== 2000 census ===
As of the census of 2000, there were 145 people, 47 households, and 36 families living in the village. The population density was 935.6 inhabitants per square mile (361.2/km^{2}). There were 53 housing units at an average density of 342.0 per square mile (132.0/km^{2}). The racial makeup of the village was 86.21% White, 12.41% from other races, and 1.38% from two or more races. Hispanic or Latino of any race were 17.24% of the population.

There were 47 households, out of which 42.6% had children under the age of 18 living with them, 55.3% were married couples living together, 17.0% had a female householder with no husband present, and 23.4% were non-families. 12.8% of all households were made up of individuals, and 4.3% had someone living alone who was 65 years of age or older. The average household size was 3.09 and the average family size was 3.31.

In the village, the population was spread out, with 31.7% under the age of 18, 17.9% from 18 to 24, 17.9% from 25 to 44, 26.2% from 45 to 64, and 6.2% who were 65 years of age or older. The median age was 26 years. For every 100 females, there were 116.4 males. For every 100 females age 18 and over, there were 102.0 males.

As of 2000 the median income for a household in the village was $38,750; and the median income for a family was $45,250. Males had a median income of $21,250 versus $25,417 for females. The per capita income for the village was $13,592. About 7.7% of families and 10.1% of the population were below the poverty line, including 4.4% of under eighteens and 53.3% of those over 64.
