= Chambers Township =

Chambers Township may refer to:

- Chambers Township, Ontario, Canada
- Chambers Township, Holt County, Nebraska, United States
