= Inman Township, Holt County, Nebraska =

Inman Township
- Township
- Location in Holt County
- Coordinates: 42°20′08″N 098°33′25″W
- Country: United States
- State: Nebraska
- County: Holt

Area
  - Total: 95.62 sq mi (247.65 km^{2})
  - Land: 95.61 sq mi (247.62 km^{2})
  - Water: 0.012 sq mi (0.03 km^{2}) 0.01%
- Elevation: 2,008 ft (612 m)

Population (2020)
  - Total: 263
  - Density: 2.75/sq mi (1.06/km^{2})
- GNIS feature ID: 0838068

Inman Township is one of thirty-seven townships in Holt County, Nebraska, United States. The population was 263 at the 2020 census. A 2021 estimate placed the township's population at 260.

The Village of Inman lies within the Township.

== See also ==
- County government in Nebraska
