= Michael Stafford =

Michael Stafford may refer to:

- Maverick Sabre, born Michael Stafford, English-Irish singer, songwriter, and rapper
- Mike Stafford, character in film An American Affair
- Michael Stafford, namesake of Stafford, Nebraska
