= Barry Salzberg =

American businessman (born 1953)

- Education: Brooklyn College; Brooklyn Law School (JD; 1977); New York University School of Law (LLM in tax)
- Employer: Deloitte Touche Tohmatsu Limited
- Title: Global Chief Executive Officer

Barry Salzberg (born October 1953) is an American businessman, accountant, and lawyer. Salzberg is full-time Professor at Columbia University and former global Chief Executive Officer of Deloitte Touche Tohmatsu Limited, a position he held from June 2011 until May 2015.

== Biography ==
Salzberg is Jewish, and grew up in a poor neighborhood in Brooklyn, the youngest of five siblings. His parents were clerks, and he and his older sister were the first in his family to attend university. His father died while Salzberg was in high school, so he worked to help his family financially, and continued to live at home and work while he attended college. He is the father of Matt Salzberg co-founder of Blue Apron.

Salzberg earned an undergraduate B.S. degree in accounting from Brooklyn College in 1974, a JD from Brooklyn Law School (1977), and an LLM in tax from the New York University School of Law.

Salzberg joined Deloitte in 1977, and became a partner of Deloitte U.S. in 1985. He was the Chief Executive Officer of Deloitte LLP (United States) from 2007 to 2011.
