= Grattan Township =

Grattan Township may refer to the following places in the United States:

- Grattan Township, Michigan
- Grattan Township, Itasca County, Minnesota
- Grattan Township, Holt County, Nebraska
