= Paddock Township, Nebraska =

Paddock Township, Nebraska may refer to the following places:

- Paddock Township, Gage County, Nebraska
- Paddock Township, Holt County, Nebraska
