= Scott Township, Nebraska =

Scott Township, Nebraska may refer to the following places:

- Scott Township, Buffalo County, Nebraska
- Scott Township, Holt County, Nebraska

See also

- Scott Township (disambiguation)
