= Golden Township, Holt County, Nebraska =

Golden Township
- Township
- Location in Holt County
- Coordinates: 42°18′28″N 098°23′21″W
- Country: United States
- State: Nebraska
- County: Holt

Area
  - Total: 53.72 sq mi (139.13 km^{2})
  - Land: 53.64 sq mi (138.92 km^{2})
  - Water: 0.081 sq mi (0.21 km^{2}) 0.15%
- Elevation: 1,870 ft (570 m)

Population (2020)
  - Total: 102
  - Density: 1.90/sq mi (0.734/km^{2})
- GNIS feature ID: 0838029

Golden Township is one of thirty-seven townships in Holt County, Nebraska, United States. The population was 102 at the 2020 census. A 2021 estimate placed the township's population at 101.

A small portion of the Village of Ewing lies within the Township.

== See also ==
- County government in Nebraska
