= Ewing Township =

Ewing Township may refer to the following places in the United States:

- Ewing Township, Boone County, Arkansas
- Ewing Township, Franklin County, Illinois
- Ewing Township, Michigan
- Ewing Township, Holt County, Nebraska
- Ewing Township, New Jersey
