= Sappa Township =

Sappa Township may refer to one of the following places in the United States:

- Sappa Township, Decatur County, Kansas
- Sappa Township, Harlan County, Nebraska
