= Emmet Township, Holt County, Nebraska =

Emmet Township
- Township
- Location in Holt County
- Coordinates: 42°25′45″N 098°49′03″W
- Country: United States
- State: Nebraska
- County: Holt

Area
  - Total: 71.2 sq mi (184.4 km^{2})
  - Land: 71.14 sq mi (184.26 km^{2})
  - Water: 0.058 sq mi (0.15 km^{2}) 0.08%
- Elevation: 2,057 ft (627 m)

Population (2020)
  - Total: 139
  - Density: 1.95/sq mi (0.754/km^{2})
- GNIS feature ID: 0837992

Emmet Township is one of thirty-seven townships in Holt County, Nebraska, United States. The population was 139 at the 2020 census. A 2023 estimate placed the township's population at 138.

The Village of Emmet lies within the Township.

== See also ==
- County government in Nebraska
