= Stuart Township =

Stuart Township may refer to:

- Stuart Township, Guthrie County, Iowa
- Stuart Township, Holt County, Nebraska

== See also ==
- Stuart (disambiguation)
