= Josie Township, Holt County, Nebraska =

Josie Township
- Township
- Location in Holt County
- Coordinates: 42°07′52″N 099°10′28″W
- Country: United States
- State: Nebraska
- County: Holt

Area
  - Total: 35.92 sq mi (93.02 km^{2})
  - Land: 35.87 sq mi (92.91 km^{2})
  - Water: 0.042 sq mi (0.11 km^{2}) 0.12%
- Elevation: 2,408 ft (734 m)

Population (2020)
  - Total: 19
  - Density: 0.53/sq mi (0.20/km^{2})
- ZIP code: 68711
- Area code: 308
- GNIS feature ID: 0838074

Josie Township is one of thirty-seven townships in Holt County, Nebraska, United States. The population was 19 at the 2020 census. A 2021 estimate placed the township's population at 19.

== See also ==
- County government in Nebraska
