= Belle Township, Holt County, Nebraska =

Belle Township
- Township
- Location in Holt County
- Coordinates: 42°38′44″N 098°50′27″W
- Country: United States
- State: Nebraska
- County: Holt

Area
  - Total: 35.92 sq mi (93.03 km^{2})
  - Land: 35.88 sq mi (92.92 km^{2})
  - Water: 0.042 sq mi (0.11 km^{2}) 0.12%
- Elevation: 2,018 ft (615 m)

Population (2020)
  - Total: 38
  - Density: 1.1/sq mi (0.41/km^{2})
- GNIS feature ID: 0837874

Belle Township is one of thirty-seven townships in Holt County, Nebraska, United States. The population was 38 at the 2020 census. A 2023 estimate placed the township's population at 38.

== See also ==
- County government in Nebraska
