= Green Valley Township, Holt County, Nebraska =

Green Valley Township
- Township
- Location in Holt County
- Coordinates: 42°26′15″N 099°07′03″W
- Country: United States
- State: Nebraska
- County: Holt

Area
  - Total: 70.77 sq mi (183.29 km^{2})
  - Land: 70.52 sq mi (182.64 km^{2})
  - Water: 0.25 sq mi (0.65 km^{2}) 0.35%
- Elevation: 2,218 ft (676 m)

Population (2020)
  - Total: 71
  - Density: 1.0/sq mi (0.39/km^{2})
- GNIS feature ID: 0838043

Green Valley Township is one of thirty-seven townships in Holt County, Nebraska, United States. The population was 71 at the 2020 census. While a 2021 estimate placed the township's population at 70.

== See also ==
- County government in Nebraska
