= Antelope Township, Holt County, Nebraska =

Antelope Township
- Township
- Location in Holt County
- Coordinates: 42°28′48″N 098°29′11″W
- Country: United States
- State: Nebraska
- County: Holt

Area
  - Total: 36.05 sq mi (93.36 km^{2})
  - Land: 36.05 sq mi (93.36 km^{2})
  - Water: 0 sq mi (0 km^{2}) 0%
- Elevation: 1,942 ft (592 m)

Population (2020)
  - Total: 33
  - Density: 0.92/sq mi (0.35/km^{2})
- GNIS feature ID: 0837856

Antelope Township is one of thirty-seven townships in Holt County, Nebraska, United States. The population was 33 at the 2020 census. A 2023 estimate placed the township's population at 33.

== See also ==
- County government in Nebraska
