= Cleveland Township, Holt County, Nebraska =

Cleveland Township
- Township
- Location in Holt County
- Coordinates: 42°45′30″N 099°09′47″W
- Country: United States
- State: Nebraska
- County: Holt

Area
  - Total: 85.80 sq mi (222.23 km^{2})
  - Land: 85.8 sq mi (222.2 km^{2})
  - Water: 0.012 sq mi (0.03 km^{2}) 0.01%
- Elevation: 2,070 ft (630 m)

Population (2020)
  - Total: 38
  - Density: 0.44/sq mi (0.17/km^{2})
- GNIS feature ID: 0837927

Cleveland Township is one of thirty-seven townships in Holt County, Nebraska, United States. The population was 38 at the 2020 census. A 2023 estimate placed the township's population at 38.

== See also ==
- County government in Nebraska
