= Stuart Township, Holt County, Nebraska =

Stuart Township
- Township
- Location in Holt County
- Coordinates: 42°35′09″N 099°09′26″W
- Country: United States
- State: Nebraska
- County: Holt

Area
  - Total: 134.92 sq mi (349.45 km^{2})
  - Land: 134.77 sq mi (349.06 km^{2})
  - Water: 0.15 sq mi (0.39 km^{2}) 0.11%
- Elevation: 2,156 ft (657 m)

Population (2020)
  - Total: 799
  - Density: 5.93/sq mi (2.29/km^{2})
- GNIS feature ID: 0838274

Stuart Township is one of thirty-seven townships in Holt County, Nebraska, United States. The population was 799 at the 2020 census. A 2021 estimate placed the township's population at 793.

The Village of Stuart lies within the Township.

== See also ==
- County government in Nebraska
