= Sand Creek Township, Holt County, Nebraska =

Sand Creek Township
- Township
- Location in Holt County
- Coordinates: 42°43′04″N 098°58′51″W
- Country: United States
- State: Nebraska
- County: Holt

Area
  - Total: 81.31 sq mi (210.59 km^{2})
  - Land: 81.30 sq mi (210.56 km^{2})
  - Water: 0.0077 sq mi (0.02 km^{2}) 0.01%
- Elevation: 2,070 ft (631 m)

Population (2020)
  - Total: 74
  - Density: 0.91/sq mi (0.35/km^{2})
- GNIS feature ID: 0838226

Sand Creek Township is one of thirty-seven townships in Holt County, Nebraska, United States. The population was 74 at the 2020 census. A 2021 estimate placed the township's population at 73.

== See also ==
- County government in Nebraska
