= Holt Creek Township, Holt County, Nebraska =

Holt Creek Township
- Township
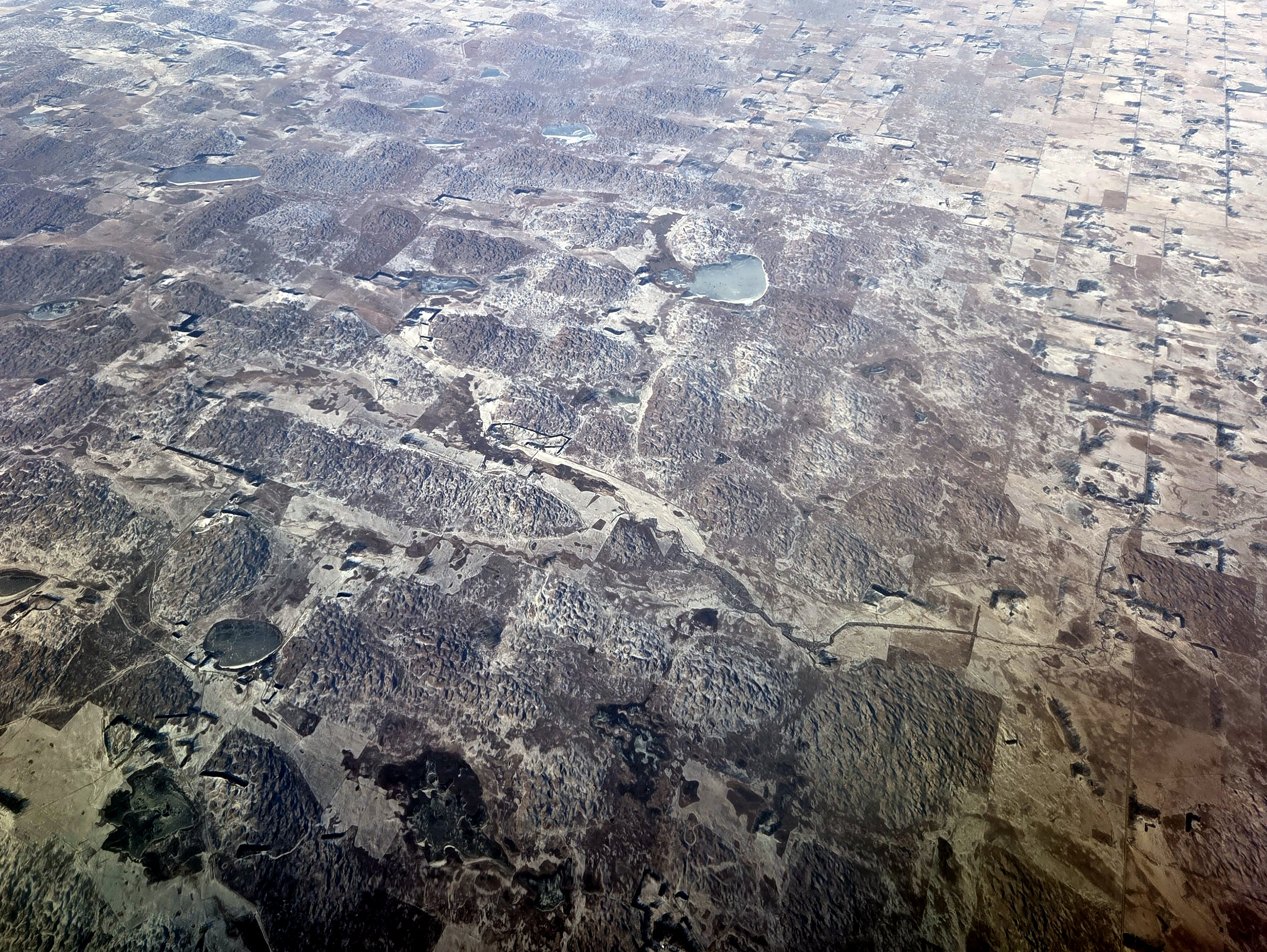
- Aerial view of Holt Township in 2025

- Location in Holt County
- Coordinates: 42°18′44″N 099°10′22″W
- Country: United States
- State: Nebraska
- County: Holt

Area
  - Total: 53.42 sq mi (138.37 km^{2})
  - Land: 52.66 sq mi (136.38 km^{2})
  - Water: 0.77 sq mi (1.99 km^{2}) 1.44%
- Elevation: 2,313 ft (705 m)

Population (2020)
  - Total: 25
  - Density: 0.47/sq mi (0.18/km^{2})
- GNIS feature ID: 0838060

Holt Creek Township is one of thirty-seven townships in Holt County, Nebraska, United States. The population was 25 at the 2020 census. A 2021 estimate placed the township's population at 25.

== See also ==
- County government in Nebraska
