= North Frankfort Township, Knox County, Nebraska =

North Frankfort Township
- Township
- Location in Knox County
- Coordinates: 42°50′47″N 097°32′43″W
- Country: United States
- State: Nebraska
- County: Knox

Area
  - Total: 8.86 sq mi (22.96 km^{2})
  - Land: 3.27 sq mi (8.48 km^{2})
  - Water: 5.59 sq mi (14.48 km^{2}) 63.07%
- Elevation: 1,204 ft (367 m)

Population (2020)
  - Total: 167
  - Density: 51.0/sq mi (19.7/km^{2})
- ZIP code: 68730
- Area codes: 402 and 531
- GNIS feature ID: 0838163

North Frankfort Township is one of thirty townships in Knox County, Nebraska, United States. The population was 167 at the 2020 census. A 2023 estimate placed the township's population at 167.

== See also ==
- County government in Nebraska
