= Conley Township, Holt County, Nebraska =

Conley Township
- Township
- Location in Holt County
- Coordinates: 42°08′13″N 098°47′15″W
- Country: United States
- State: Nebraska
- County: Holt

Area
  - Total: 72.31 sq mi (187.28 km^{2})
  - Land: 72.30 sq mi (187.26 km^{2})
  - Water: 0.0077 sq mi (0.02 km^{2}) 0.01%
- Elevation: 2,182 ft (665 m)

Population (2020)
  - Total: 58
  - Density: 0.80/sq mi (0.31/km^{2})
- GNIS feature ID: 0837937

Conley Township is one of thirty-seven townships in Holt County, Nebraska, United States. The population was 58 at the 2020 census. A 2023 estimate placed the township's population at 58.

== See also ==
- County government in Nebraska
