= Swan Township, Holt County, Nebraska =

Swan Township
- Township
- Location in Holt County
- Coordinates: 42°11′23″N 099°05′33″W
- Country: United States
- State: Nebraska
- County: Holt

Area
  - Total: 107.39 sq mi (278.14 km^{2})
  - Land: 106.7 sq mi (276.3 km^{2})
  - Water: 0.71 sq mi (1.84 km^{2}) 0.66%
- Elevation: 2,336 ft (712 m)

Population (2020)
  - Total: 39
  - Density: 0.37/sq mi (0.14/km^{2})
- GNIS feature ID: 0838279

Swan Township is one of thirty-seven townships in Holt County, Nebraska, United States. The population was 39 at the 2020 census. A 2021 estimate placed the township's population at 39.

== See also ==
- County government in Nebraska
