= Shamrock Township, Holt County, Nebraska =

Shamrock Township
- Township
- Location in Holt County
- Coordinates: 42°18′48″N 098°43′47″W
- Country: United States
- State: Nebraska
- County: Holt

Area
  - Total: 54.39 sq mi (140.87 km^{2})
  - Land: 54.37 sq mi (140.82 km^{2})
  - Water: 0.019 sq mi (0.05 km^{2}) 0.04%
- Elevation: 2,080 ft (634 m)

Population (2020)
  - Total: 40
  - Density: 0.74/sq mi (0.28/km^{2})
- ZIP code: 68725
- Area codes: 402 and 531
- GNIS feature ID: 0838239

Shamrock Township is one of thirty-seven townships in Holt County, Nebraska, United States. The population was 40 at the 2020 census. A 2021 estimate placed the township's population at 40.

== See also ==
- County government in Nebraska
