= Ewing Township, Holt County, Nebraska =

Ewing Township
- Township
- Location in Holt County
- Coordinates: 42°13′01″N 098°22′47″W
- Country: United States
- State: Nebraska
- County: Holt

Area
  - Total: 54.36 sq mi (140.79 km^{2})
  - Land: 54.24 sq mi (140.49 km^{2})
  - Water: 0.12 sq mi (0.3 km^{2}) 0.21%
- Elevation: 1,896 ft (578 m)

Population (2020)
  - Total: 415
  - Density: 7.65/sq mi (2.95/km^{2})
- ZIP code: 68735
- Area codes: 402 and 531
- GNIS feature ID: 0837997

Ewing Township is one of thirty-seven townships in Holt County, Nebraska, United States. The population was 415 at the 2020 census. A 2023 estimate placed the township's population at 411.

Most of the Village of Ewing lies within the Township.

== See also ==
- County government in Nebraska
