= Willowdale Township, Holt County, Nebraska =

Willowdale Township
- Township
- Location in Holt County
- Coordinates: 42°33′57″N 098°25′56″W
- Country: United States
- State: Nebraska
- County: Holt

Area
  - Total: 72.07 sq mi (186.65 km^{2})
  - Land: 72.04 sq mi (186.57 km^{2})
  - Water: 0.031 sq mi (0.08 km^{2}) 0.04%
- Elevation: 1,880 ft (573 m)

Population (2020)
  - Total: 38
  - Density: 0.53/sq mi (0.20/km^{2})
- ZIP code: 68763
- Area codes: 402 and 531
- GNIS feature ID: 0838333

Willowdale Township is one of thirty-seven townships in Holt County, Nebraska, United States. The population was 38 at the 2020 census. A 2021 estimate placed the township's population at 38.

== See also ==
- County government in Nebraska
