= Dustin Township, Holt County, Nebraska =

Dustin Township
- Township
- Location in Holt County
- Coordinates: 42°50′29″N 098°59′28″W
- Country: United States
- State: Nebraska
- County: Holt

Area
  - Total: 59.82 sq mi (154.93 km^{2})
  - Land: 59.82 sq mi (154.93 km^{2})
  - Water: 0 sq mi (0 km^{2}) 0%
- Elevation: 1,841 ft (561 m)

Population (2020)
  - Total: 19
  - Density: 0.32/sq mi (0.12/km^{2})
- GNIS feature ID: 0837970

Dustin Township is one of thirty-seven townships in Holt County, Nebraska, United States. The population was 19 at the 2020 census. A 2023 estimate placed the township's population at 19.

== See also ==
- County government in Nebraska
