= Catalpa, Nebraska =

Unincorporated community in Nebraska, U.S.

Coordinates: 42°46′34″N 98°52′07″W

Catalpa is an unincorporated community in Holt County, Nebraska, United States.

== History ==
A post office was established at Catalpa in the 1880s. It was named from a grove of Catalpa trees near the town site.
