= Holt County, Nebraska =

County in Nebraska, United States

- County
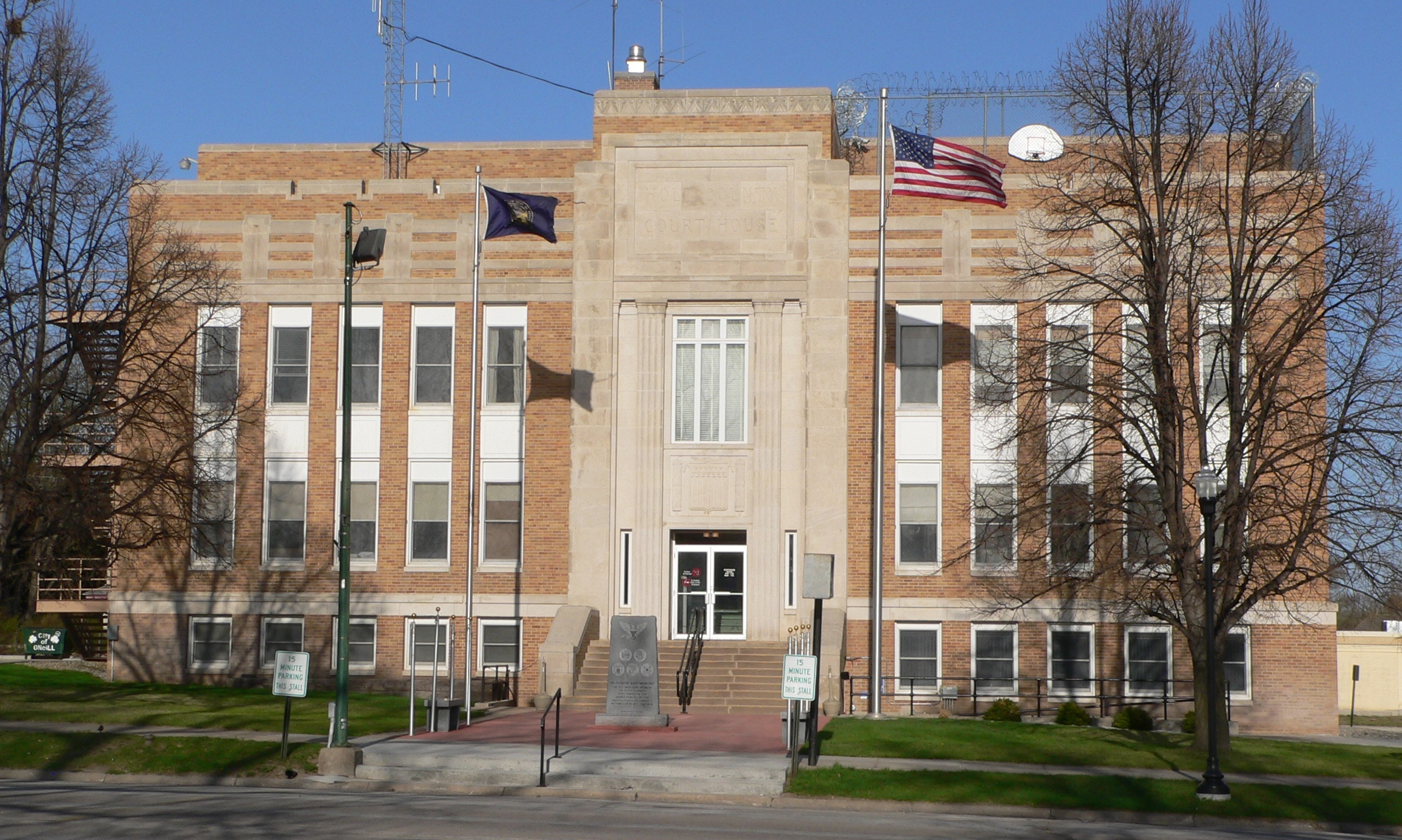
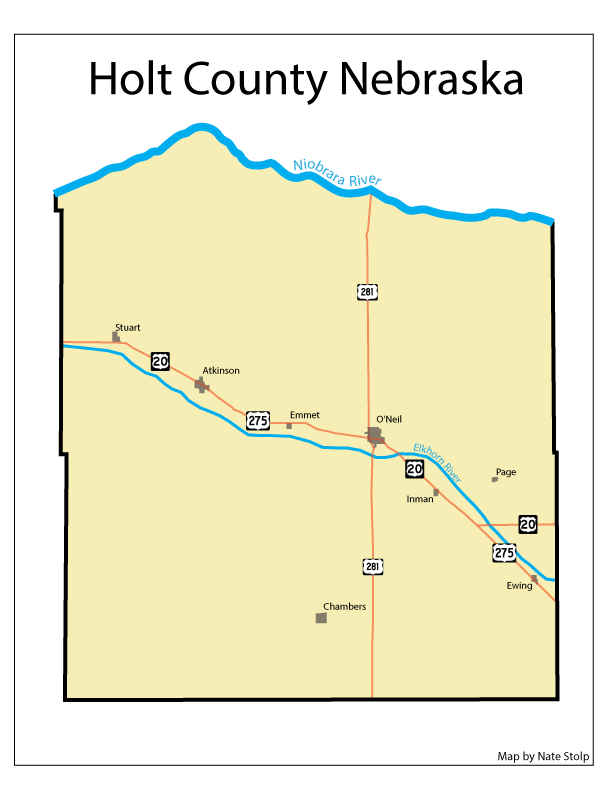
- The Holt County Courthouse in O'Neill Holt County, Nebraska

- Location within the U.S. state of Nebraska
- Coordinates: 42.459287°N 98.784766°W
- Country: United States
- State: Nebraska
- Created: January 9, 1862
- Organized: December 27, 1876
- Named for: Joseph Holt
- Seat: O'Neill
- Largest city: O'Neill

Area
  - Total: 2,417.496 sq mi (6,261.29 km^{2})
  - Land: 2,411.851 sq mi (6,246.67 km^{2})
  - Water: 5.645 sq mi (14.62 km^{2}) 0.23%

Population (2020)
  - Total: 10,127
  - Estimate (2025): 10,067 ▼
  - Density: 4.1988/sq mi (1.6212/km^{2})
- Time zone: UTC−6 (Central)
  - Summer (DST): UTC−5 (CDT)
- Area code: 402 and 531
- Congressional district: 3rd
- Website: holtcounty.nebraska.gov
- • Nebraska county number 45 • Nebraska license plate prefix 36

Holt County is a county in the U.S. state of Nebraska. As of the 2020 census, the population was 10,127, and was estimated to be 10,067 in 2025. The county seat and the largest city is O'Neill.

In the Nebraska license plate system, Holt County was represented by the prefix "36" (as it had the 36th-largest number of vehicles registered in the state when the license plate system was established in 1922).

== History ==
Holt County was created by an act of the Nebraska Territory Legislature on January 9, 1862, and was organized on December 27, 1876. It is named for Joseph Holt of Kentucky, who was postmaster general and secretary of war under President James Buchanan. It shares its name with Holt County, Missouri, though it is named for a different Holt.

Holt County is in the Outback area of Nebraska.

== Geography ==
According to the United States Census Bureau, the county has a total area of 2,417.496 square miles (6,261.29 km^{2}), of which 2,411.851 square miles (6,246.67 km^{2}) is land and 5.645 square miles (14.62 km^{2}) (0.23%) is water. It is the 5th-largest county in Nebraska by total area.

The terrain of Holt County consists of low, rolling hills, with the flattened areas used for agriculture. The Niobrara River flows eastward along the north line of the county, and the Elkhorn River flows southeastward through the upper central portion of the county.

=== Major highways ===
- U.S. Highway 20
- U.S. Highway 275
- U.S. Highway 281
- Nebraska Highway 11
- Nebraska Highway 95

=== Adjacent counties ===
- Antelope County – east
- Boyd County – north
- Knox County – east
- Wheeler County – south
- Garfield County – south
- Loup County – southwest
- Rock County – west
- Keya Paha County – northwest

== Demographics ==
Historical population
Census	Pop.	Note	%±
1880	3,287		—
1890	13,672		315.9%
1900	12,224		−10.6%
1910	15,545		27.2%
1920	17,151		10.3%
1930	16,509		−3.7%
1940	16,552		0.3%
1950	14,489		−12.5%
1960	13,722		−5.3%
1970	12,933		−5.7%
1980	13,552		4.8%
1990	12,599		−7.0%
2000	11,551		−8.3%
2010	10,435		−9.7%
2020	10,127		−3.0%
2025 (est.)	10,067	▼	−0.6%
U.S. Decennial Census; 1790–1960 1900–1990; 1990–2000 2010–2020

=== 2020 census ===
As of the 2020 census, the county had a population of 10,127. The median age was 43.1 years. 24.1% of residents were under the age of 18 and 22.5% of residents were 65 years of age or older. For every 100 females there were 102.3 males, and for every 100 females age 18 and over there were 99.7 males age 18 and over.

The racial makeup of the county was 93.4% White, 0.4% Black or African American, 0.5% American Indian and Alaska Native, 0.5% Asian, 0.0% Native Hawaiian and Pacific Islander, 2.4% from some other race, and 2.8% from two or more races. Hispanic or Latino residents of any race comprised 5.1% of the population.

0.0% of residents lived in urban areas, while 100.0% lived in rural areas.

There were 4,257 households in the county, of which 26.9% had children under the age of 18 living with them and 21.5% had a female householder with no spouse or partner present. About 31.4% of all households were made up of individuals and 15.0% had someone living alone who was 65 years of age or older.

There were 4,893 housing units, of which 13.0% were vacant. Among occupied housing units, 72.1% were owner-occupied and 27.9% were renter-occupied. The homeowner vacancy rate was 1.1% and the rental vacancy rate was 10.0%.

=== 2000 census ===
As of the 2000 census, there were 11,551 people, 4,608 households, and 3,170 families were residing in the county. The population density was 5 people/mi^{2} (1.9 people/km^{2}). The 5,281 housing units averaged 2 per square mile (0.77/km^{2}). The racial makeup of the county was 98.86% White, 0.03% African American, 0.29% Native American, 0.18% Asian, 0.05% Pacific Islander, 0.23% from other races, and 0.35% from two or more races. About 0.71% of the population was Hispanic or Latino of any race. By ancestry, 46.0% were German, 12.5% Irish, 8.6% American, 7.5% English, and 5.4% Czech.

Of the 4,608 households, 31.6% had children under 18 living with them, 60.7% were married couples living together, 5.6% had a female householder with no husband present, and 31.2% were not families. About 28.7% of all households were made up of individuals, and 15.1% had someone living alone who was 65 or older. The average household size was 2.46, and the average family size was 3.06.

The county's age distribution was 27.30% under 18, 5.70% from 18 to 24, 24.50% from 25 to 44, 22.70% from 45 to 64, and 19.80% who were 65 or older. The median age was 40 years. For every 100 females there were 96.90 males. For every 100 females age 18 and over, there were 93.50 males.

The median income for a household in the county was $30,738, and for a family was $37,463. Males had a median income of $24,681 versus $17,593 for females. The per capita income for the county was $15,256. About 9.8% of families and 13.0% of the population were below the poverty line, including 15.0% of those under age 18 and 12.1% of those age 65 or over.

== Communities ==
=== Cities ===
- Atkinson
- O'Neill (county seat)

=== Villages ===
- Chambers
- Emmet
- Ewing
- Inman
- Page
- Stuart

=== Unincorporated communities ===
- Amelia
- Anncar
- Catalpa
- Deloit
- Dorsey
- Dustin
- Inez
- Meek
- Opportunity
- Paddock
- Redbird
- Stafford
- Star

=== Townships ===
- Antelope
- Atkinson
- Belle
- Chambers
- Cleveland
- Coleman
- Conley
- Deloit
- Dustin
- Emmet
- Ewing
- Fairview
- Francis
- Golden
- Grattan
- Green Valley
- Holt Creek
- Inman
- Iowa
- Josie
- Lake
- McClure
- Paddock
- Pleasant View
- Rock Falls
- Sand Creek
- Saratoga
- Scott
- Shamrock
- Sheridan
- Shields
- Steel Creek
- Stuart
- Swan
- Verdigris
- Willowdale
- Wyoming

== Politics ==
Holt County voters have historically tended to vote Republican. In only two elections since 1916 has the county selected the Democratic Party candidate.

United States presidential election results for Holt County, Nebraska
Year	Republican		Democratic		Third party(ies)	
Year	No.	%	No.	%	No.	%
1900	1,320	45.05%	1,492	50.92%	118	4.03%
1904	1,740	52.92%	646	19.65%	902	27.43%
1908	1,541	44.28%	1,777	51.06%	162	4.66%
1912	778	21.62%	1,456	40.47%	1,364	37.91%
1916	1,568	40.19%	2,213	56.73%	120	3.08%
1920	3,163	64.58%	1,577	32.20%	158	3.23%
1924	2,207	37.14%	1,529	25.73%	2,207	37.14%
1928	3,746	54.43%	3,126	45.42%	10	0.15%
1932	2,375	32.99%	4,761	66.13%	64	0.89%
1936	3,714	47.84%	3,902	50.26%	148	1.91%
1940	4,840	61.61%	3,016	38.39%	0	0.00%
1944	4,198	62.07%	2,565	37.93%	0	0.00%
1948	3,147	54.55%	2,622	45.45%	0	0.00%
1952	5,088	74.67%	1,726	25.33%	0	0.00%
1956	4,237	69.33%	1,874	30.67%	0	0.00%
1960	4,150	62.99%	2,438	37.01%	0	0.00%
1964	3,194	53.83%	2,739	46.17%	0	0.00%
1968	3,319	66.02%	1,278	25.42%	430	8.55%
1972	4,147	79.75%	1,053	20.25%	0	0.00%
1976	3,389	64.21%	1,751	33.18%	138	2.61%
1980	4,495	77.00%	1,016	17.40%	327	5.60%
1984	4,613	83.19%	893	16.10%	39	0.70%
1988	4,081	74.66%	1,327	24.28%	58	1.06%
1992	3,131	54.90%	835	14.64%	1,737	30.46%
1996	3,436	65.27%	1,107	21.03%	721	13.70%
2000	3,954	79.73%	846	17.06%	159	3.21%
2004	4,217	81.50%	894	17.28%	63	1.22%
2008	3,746	75.31%	1,089	21.89%	139	2.79%
2012	3,922	79.41%	882	17.86%	135	2.73%
2016	4,354	85.07%	531	10.38%	233	4.55%
2020	4,769	85.93%	686	12.36%	95	1.71%
2024	4,708	86.26%	681	12.48%	69	1.26%

== See also ==
- National Register of Historic Places listings in Holt County, Nebraska
