= Oconee Township, Platte County, Nebraska =

Oconee Township
- Township
- Location in Platte County
- Coordinates: 41°27′56″N 097°35′38″W
- Country: United States
- State: Nebraska
- County: Platte

Area
  - Total: 25.9 sq mi (67.2 km^{2})
  - Land: 25.09 sq mi (64.99 km^{2})
  - Water: 0.85 sq mi (2.21 km^{2}) 3.29%
- Elevation: 1,506 ft (459 m)

Population (2020)
  - Total: 499
  - Density: 19.9/sq mi (7.68/km^{2})
- GNIS feature ID: 0838171

Oconee Township is one of eighteen townships in Platte County, Nebraska, United States. The population was 499 at the 2020 census. A 2021 estimate placed the township's population at 490.

The Village of Monroe lies within the Township.

== History ==
Oconee Township was established in 1908. It was likely named after Oconee, Illinois.

== See also ==
- County government in Nebraska
