= Atkinson Township, Holt County, Nebraska =

Atkinson Township
- Township
- Location in Holt County
- Coordinates: 42°35′14″N 098°58′51″W
- Country: United States
- State: Nebraska
- County: Holt

Area
  - Total: 80.98 sq mi (209.75 km^{2})
  - Land: 80.88 sq mi (209.48 km^{2})
  - Water: 0.10 sq mi (0.27 km^{2}) 0.13%
- Elevation: 2,110 ft (643 m)

Population (2020)
  - Total: 1,744
  - Density: 21.56/sq mi (8.325/km^{2})
- GNIS feature ID: 0837863

Atkinson Township is one of thirty-seven townships in Holt County, Nebraska, United States. The population was 1,744 at the 2020 census. A 2023 estimate placed the township's population at 1,741.

The City of Atkinson lies within the Township.

== See also ==
- County government in Nebraska
