= Inez, Nebraska =

Unincorporated community in Nebraska, U.S.

Coordinates: 42°17′28″N 99°00′05″W

Inez is an unincorporated community in Holt County, Nebraska, United States.

== History ==
A post office was established at Inez in the 1880s. Inez was likely named for a settler.
