= Dustin, Nebraska =

Unincorporated community in Nebraska, United States

- Unincorporated Community
- Location within Nebraska Location within the United States
- Coordinates: 42.8°N 99.1°W
- Country: United States
- State: Nebraska
- County: Holt

Dustin is an unincorporated community in Holt County, Nebraska, United States.

== History ==
A post office was established at Dustin in the 1880s. Dustin was likely named for a settler.
