= Coleman Township, Holt County, Nebraska =

Coleman Township
- Township
- Location in Holt County
- Coordinates: 42°45′42″N 098°43′34″W
- Country: United States
- State: Nebraska
- County: Holt

Area
  - Total: 53.02 sq mi (137.31 km^{2})
  - Land: 52.91 sq mi (137.04 km^{2})
  - Water: 0.10 sq mi (0.27 km^{2}) 0.2%
- Elevation: 1,768 ft (539 m)

Population (2020)
  - Total: 40
  - Density: 0.76/sq mi (0.29/km^{2})
- GNIS feature ID: 0837930

Coleman Township is one of thirty-seven townships in Holt County, Nebraska, United States. The population was 40 at the 2020 census. A 2023 estimate placed the township's population at 40.

== See also ==
- County government in Nebraska
