= Shields Township, Holt County, Nebraska =

Shields Township
- Township
- Location in Holt County
- Coordinates: 42°33′49″N 098°39′03″W
- Country: United States
- State: Nebraska
- County: Holt

Area
  - Total: 72.0 sq mi (186.5 km^{2})
  - Land: 71.98 sq mi (186.42 km^{2})
  - Water: 0.031 sq mi (0.08 km^{2}) 0.04%
- Elevation: 1,942 ft (592 m)

Population (2020)
  - Total: 89
  - Density: 1.2/sq mi (0.48/km^{2})
- GNIS feature ID: 0838251

Shields Township is one of thirty-seven townships in Holt County, Nebraska, United States. The population was 89 at the 2020 census. A 2021 estimate placed the township's population at 88.

== See also ==
- County government in Nebraska
