= McClure Township, Holt County, Nebraska =

McClure Township
- Township
- Location in Holt County
- Coordinates: 42°13′18″N 098°33′25″W
- Country: United States
- State: Nebraska
- County: Holt

Area
  - Total: 54.11 sq mi (140.14 km^{2})
  - Land: 54.08 sq mi (140.07 km^{2})
  - Water: 0.027 sq mi (0.07 km^{2}) 0.05%
- Elevation: 2,030 ft (620 m)

Population (2020)
  - Total: 48
  - Density: 0.89/sq mi (0.34/km^{2})
- GNIS feature ID: 0838121

McClure Township is one of thirty-seven townships in Holt County, Nebraska, United States. The population was 48 at the 2020 census. A 2021 estimate placed the township's population at 48.

== See also ==
- County government in Nebraska
