= Steel Creek Township, Holt County, Nebraska =

Steel Creek Township
- Township
- Location in Holt County
- Coordinates: 42°41′26″N 098°22′04″W
- Country: United States
- State: Nebraska
- County: Holt

Area
  - Total: 65.77 sq mi (170.35 km^{2})
  - Land: 65.36 sq mi (169.27 km^{2})
  - Water: 0.42 sq mi (1.09 km^{2}) 0.64%
- Elevation: 1,740 ft (530 m)

Population (2020)
  - Total: 29
  - Density: 0.44/sq mi (0.17/km^{2})
- GNIS feature ID: 0838272

Steel Creek Township is one of thirty-seven townships in Holt County, Nebraska, United States. The population was 29 at the 2020 census. A 2021 estimate placed the township's population at 29.

== See also ==
- County government in Nebraska
