= Meek, Nebraska =

Unincorporated community in Nebraska, U.S.

Coordinates: 42°41′49″N 98°37′39″W

Meek is an unincorporated community in Holt County, Nebraska, United States.

== History ==
Meek was named for Samuel Meek.
