= Pleasant View Township, Holt County, Nebraska =

Pleasant View Township
- Township
- Location in Holt County
- Coordinates: 42°34′03″N 098°50′08″W
- Country: United States
- State: Nebraska
- County: Holt

Area
  - Total: 35.89 sq mi (92.96 km^{2})
  - Land: 35.83 sq mi (92.79 km^{2})
  - Water: 0.066 sq mi (0.17 km^{2}) 0.18%
- Elevation: 2,044 ft (623 m)

Population (2020)
  - Total: 83
  - Density: 2.3/sq mi (0.89/km^{2})
- GNIS feature ID: 0838192

Pleasant View Township is one of thirty-seven townships in Holt County, Nebraska, United States. The population was 83 at the 2020 census. A 2021 estimate placed the township's population at 82.

== See also ==
- County government in Nebraska
