= Columbus Township, Platte County, Nebraska =

Columbus Township
- Township
- Location in Platte County
- Coordinates: 41°26′19″N 097°20′42″W
- Country: United States
- State: Nebraska
- County: Platte

Area
  - Total: 59.01 sq mi (152.83 km^{2})
  - Land: 54.76 sq mi (141.83 km^{2})
  - Water: 4.2 sq mi (11 km^{2}) 7.2%
- Elevation: 1,440 ft (439 m)

Population (2020)
  - Total: 3,320
  - Density: 60.6/sq mi (23.4/km^{2})
- ZIP code: 68601
- Area codes: 402 and 531
- GNIS feature ID: 0837934

Columbus Township is one of eighteen townships in Platte County, Nebraska, United States. The population was 3,320 at the 2020 census. A 2021 estimate placed the township's population at 3,276.

== See also ==
- County government in Nebraska
