= Sheridan Township, Holt County, Nebraska =

Sheridan Township
- Township
- Location in Holt County
- Coordinates: 42°26′33″N 098°57′39″W
- Country: United States
- State: Nebraska
- County: Holt

Area
  - Total: 80.26 sq mi (207.87 km^{2})
  - Land: 80.25 sq mi (207.84 km^{2})
  - Water: 0.015 sq mi (0.04 km^{2}) 0.02%
- Elevation: 2,119 ft (646 m)

Population (2020)
  - Total: 168
  - Density: 2.09/sq mi (0.808/km^{2})
- GNIS feature ID: 0838244

Sheridan Township is one of thirty-seven townships in Holt County, Nebraska, United States. The population was 168 at the 2020 census. A 2021 estimate placed the township's population at 166.

== See also ==
- County government in Nebraska
