= Macon Township, Franklin County, Nebraska =

Coordinates: 40.2197°N 99.0094°W

Macon Township is a township in Franklin County, Nebraska, in the United States.

== History ==
Macon was named by an early settler for his former hometown of Macon, Georgia.
