= Industry-Rock Falls Township, Phelps County, Nebraska =

Industry-Rock Falls Township
- Township
- Location in Phelps County
- Coordinates: 40°23′49″N 099°32′09″W
- Country: United States
- State: Nebraska
- County: Phelps

Area
  - Total: 71.22 sq mi (184.47 km^{2})
  - Land: 71.22 sq mi (184.47 km^{2})
  - Water: 0 sq mi (0 km^{2}) 0%
- Elevation: 2,349 ft (716 m)

Population (2000)
  - Total: 276
  - Density: 3.9/sq mi (1.5/km^{2})
- GNIS feature ID: 0838066

Industry-Rock Falls Township is one of fourteen townships in Phelps County, Nebraska, United States. The population was 276 at the 2000 census. A 2006 estimate placed the township's population at 282.

The Village of Atlanta lies within the Township.

== See also ==
- County government in Nebraska
