= Bone Creek Township, Butler County, Nebraska =

Bone Creek Township
- Township
- Location in Butler County
- Coordinates: 41°21′29″N 097°04′16″W
- Country: United States
- State: Nebraska
- County: Butler

Area
  - Total: 37.98 sq mi (98.36 km^{2})
  - Land: 37.92 sq mi (98.21 km^{2})
  - Water: 0.054 sq mi (0.14 km^{2}) 0.14%
- Elevation: 1,398 ft (426 m)

Population (2020)
  - Total: 366
  - Density: 9.65/sq mi (3.73/km^{2})
- GNIS feature ID: 0837891

Bone Creek Township is one of seventeen townships in Butler County, Nebraska, United States. The population was 366 at the 2020 census. A 2021 estimate placed the township's population at 369. The name is from the translation of a Pawnee language term for Bone Creek, referring to the fossils of mastodons and other ancient creatures found along its eroding banks.

The Village of Octavia lies within the Township. The Bone Creek Museum of Agrarian Art is in David City, Nebraska.

== See also ==
- County government in Nebraska
