= Fairview Township, Holt County, Nebraska =

Fairview Township
- Township
- Location in Holt County
- Coordinates: 42°18′49″N 098°54′39″W
- Country: United States
- State: Nebraska
- County: Holt

Area
  - Total: 53.85 sq mi (139.48 km^{2})
  - Land: 53.72 sq mi (139.13 km^{2})
  - Water: 0.14 sq mi (0.36 km^{2}) 0.26%
- Elevation: 2,159 ft (658 m)

Population (2020)
  - Total: 35
  - Density: 0.65/sq mi (0.25/km^{2})
- GNIS feature ID: 0838002

Fairview Township is one of thirty-seven townships in Holt County, Nebraska, United States. The population was 35 at the 2020 census. A 2021 estimate placed the township's population at 35.
