= Elkhorn Township, Dodge County, Nebraska =

Elkhorn Township
- Township
- Location in Dodge County
- Coordinates: 41°25′36″N 096°24′02″W
- Country: United States
- State: Nebraska
- County: Dodge

Area
  - Total: 32.77 sq mi (84.87 km^{2})
  - Land: 32.41 sq mi (83.93 km^{2})
  - Water: 0.36 sq mi (0.94 km^{2}) 1.11%
- Elevation: 1,161 ft (354 m)

Population (2020)
  - Total: 341
  - Density: 10.5/sq mi (4.06/km^{2})
- GNIS feature ID: 0837984

Elkhorn Township is one of fourteen townships in Dodge County, Nebraska, United States. The population was 341 at the 2020 census. A 2021 estimate placed the township's population at 332.

== See also ==
- County government in Nebraska
