= Washington Township, Hall County, Nebraska =

Washington Township
- Township
- Location within Nebraska
- Coordinates: 40°54′04″N 98°18′02″W
- Country: United States
- State: Nebraska
- County: Hall

Area
  - Total: 18.8 sq mi (49 km^{2})
  - Land: 18.66 sq mi (48.3 km^{2})
  - Water: 0.14 sq mi (0.36 km^{2})
- Elevation: 1,844 ft (562 m)

Population (2020)
  - Total: 1,777
  - Density: 95.23/sq mi (36.77/km^{2})
- Time zone: UTC-6 (Central (CST))
  - Summer (DST): UTC-5 (CDT)
- Area code: 308
- FIPS code: 31-51455
- GNIS feature ID: 838317

Washington Township is a township in Hall County, Nebraska, United States. The population was 1,777 the 2020 census.

The township is directly east of the city of Grand Island.
