= Wyoming Township, Holt County, Nebraska =

Wyoming Township
- Township
- Location in Holt County
- Coordinates: 42°11′28″N 098°56′14″W
- Country: United States
- State: Nebraska
- County: Holt

Area
  - Total: 71.88 sq mi (186.16 km^{2})
  - Land: 71.72 sq mi (185.76 km^{2})
  - Water: 0.15 sq mi (0.4 km^{2}) 0.21%
- Elevation: 2,211 ft (674 m)

Population (2020)
  - Total: 78
  - Density: 1.1/sq mi (0.42/km^{2})
- GNIS feature ID: 0838340

Wyoming Township is one of thirty-seven townships in Holt County, Nebraska, United States. The population was 78 at the 2020 census. A 2021 estimate placed the township's population at 77.

== See also ==
- County government in Nebraska
