= Paddock Township, Holt County, Nebraska =

Paddock Township
- Township
- Location in Holt County
- Coordinates: 42°42′16″N 098°35′19″W
- Country: United States
- State: Nebraska
- County: Holt

Area
  - Total: 74.77 sq mi (193.65 km^{2})
  - Land: 74.2 sq mi (192.2 km^{2})
  - Water: 0.56 sq mi (1.45 km^{2}) 0.75%
- Elevation: 1,770 ft (540 m)

Population (2020)
  - Total: 68
  - Density: 0.92/sq mi (0.35/km^{2})
- GNIS feature ID: 0838182

Paddock Township is one of thirty-seven townships in Holt County, Nebraska, United States. The population was 68 at the 2020 census. A 2021 estimate placed the township's population at 68.

Paddock Township was named for Algernon Paddock, a U.S. Senator from Nebraska.

Paddock Township is the site of a small settlement on the Niobrara River called Paddock. From 1876 to 1879 this settlement was the county seat of Holt County.

== See also ==
- County government in Nebraska
