= Holt County Courthouse =

- U.S. National Register of Historic Places
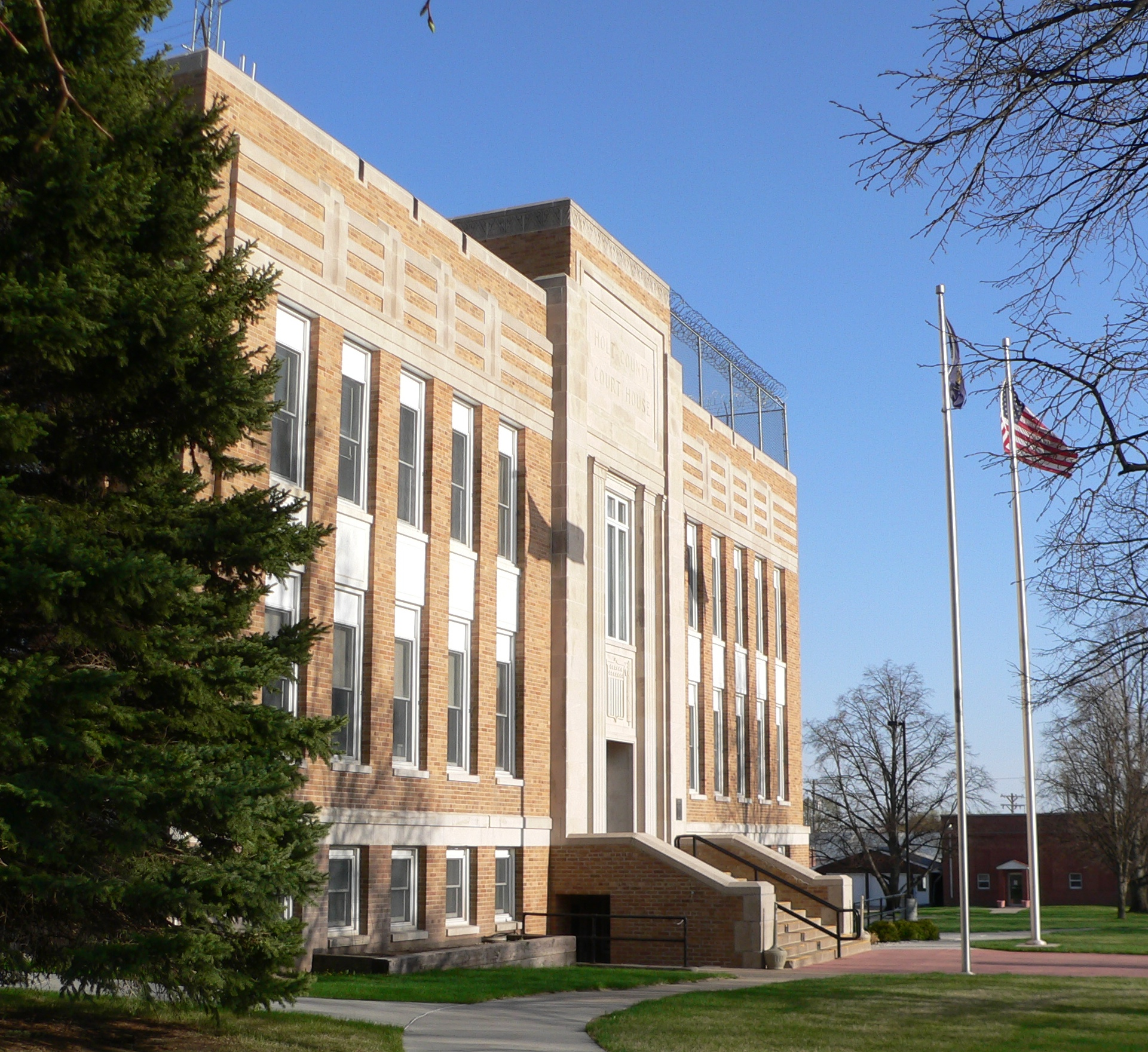

- Location within Nebraska Location within the United States
- Location: N. 4th St. between E. Clay and Benton Sts., O'Neill, Nebraska
- Coordinates: 42°27′34″N 98°38′49″W
- Area: less than one acre
- Built: 1936
- Architect: John Latenser & Sons
- Architectural style: Art Deco
- MPS: County Courthouses of Nebraska MPS
- NRHP reference No.: 90000974
- Added to NRHP: July 5, 1990

The Holt County Courthouse in O'Neill, Nebraska is a historic building that is listed on the National Register of Historic Places. It is located on N. 4th St. between E. Clay and Benton Streets. It was built in 1936.

The courthouse was deemed significant for its architecture and its historic association with politics and local government. It was found to be "a good example of public architecture in the county" and to be a "good example of the County Citadel Property Type". The courthouse was one of seven built by Federal works programs during the Great Depression.

The NRHP listing, in 1990, included two contributing buildings. The site is also designated HT13 53.
