= Iowa Township, Holt County, Nebraska =

Iowa Township
- Township
- Location in Holt County
- Coordinates: 42°28′33″N 098°21′32″W
- Country: United States
- State: Nebraska
- County: Holt

Area
  - Total: 36.03 sq mi (93.33 km^{2})
  - Land: 36.00 sq mi (93.23 km^{2})
  - Water: 0.039 sq mi (0.1 km^{2}) 0.11%
- Elevation: 1,870 ft (570 m)

Population (2020)
  - Total: 49
  - Density: 1.4/sq mi (0.53/km^{2})
- ZIP code: 68766
- Area codes: 402 and 531
- GNIS feature ID: 0838069

Iowa Township is one of thirty-seven townships in Holt County, Nebraska, United States. The population was 49 at the 2020 census. A 2021 estimate placed the township's population at 49.

== See also ==
- County government in Nebraska
