= Silver Lake Township, Adams County, Nebraska =

Township in Nebraska, United States

Coordinates: 40°23′51″N 98°33′31″W

Silver Lake Township is one of sixteen townships in Adams County, Nebraska, United States. The population was 63 at the 2020 census.

== See also ==
- County government in Nebraska
