= Stafford, Nebraska =

- Unincorporated community
- Location within Nebraska Location within the United States
- Coordinates: 42°19′42″N 98°26′49″W
- Country: United States
- State: Nebraska
- County: Holt County

Stafford is an unincorporated community in Holt County, Nebraska, United States.

== History ==
A post office was established at Stafford in the 1880s. The community was named for Michael Stafford, a railroad official.
