= Francis Township, Holt County, Nebraska =

Francis Township
- Township
- Location in Holt County
- Coordinates: 42°18′49″N 099°03′24″W
- Country: United States
- State: Nebraska
- County: Holt

Area
  - Total: 54.01 sq mi (139.88 km^{2})
  - Land: 53.79 sq mi (139.32 km^{2})
  - Water: 0.22 sq mi (0.57 km^{2}) 0.41%
- Elevation: 2,260 ft (689 m)

Population (2020)
  - Total: 25
  - Density: 0.46/sq mi (0.18/km^{2})
- GNIS feature ID: 0838005

Francis Township is one of thirty-seven townships in Holt County, Nebraska, United States. The population was 25 at the 2020 census. A 2021 estimate placed the township's population at 25.
