= Emmet, Nebraska =

Village in Holt County, Nebraska, United States

- Village
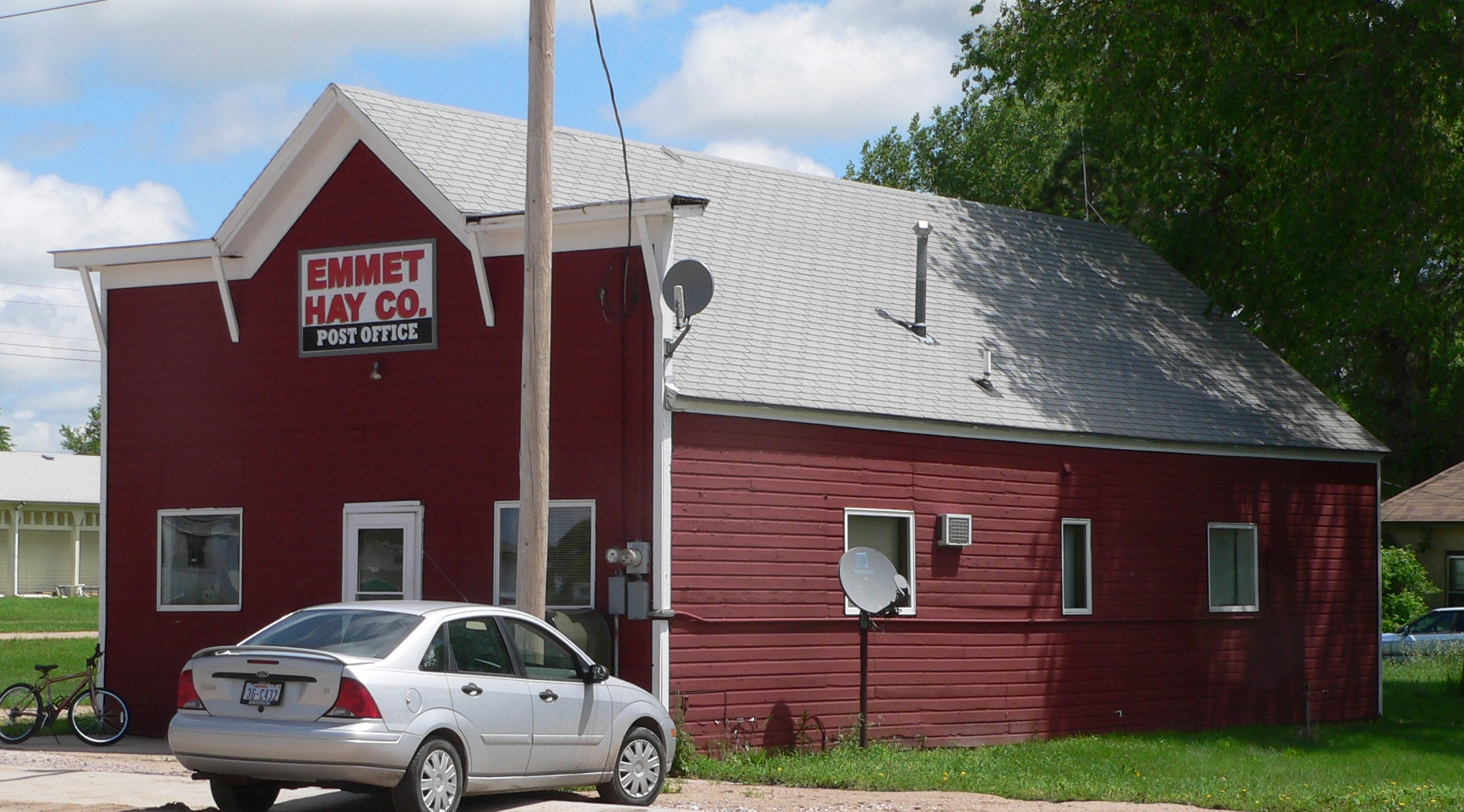
- Post office in Emmet

- Location of Emmet, Nebraska
- Coordinates: 42°28′33″N 98°48′33″W
- Country: United States
- State: Nebraska
- County: Holt

Area
  - Total: 0.26 sq mi (0.67 km^{2})
  - Land: 0.26 sq mi (0.67 km^{2})
  - Water: 0 sq mi (0.00 km^{2})
- Elevation: 2,024 ft (617 m)

Population (2020)
  - Total: 46
  - Density: 178.4/sq mi (68.89/km^{2})
- Time zone: UTC-6 (Central (CST))
  - Summer (DST): UTC-5 (CDT)
- ZIP code: 68734
- Area code: 402
- FIPS code: 31-15815
- GNIS feature ID: 2398829

Emmet is a village in Holt County, Nebraska, United States. As of the 2020 census, Emmet had a population of 46.

== History ==
Emmet was founded in 1882 when the Fremont, Elkhorn and Missouri Valley Railroad was extended to that point. It was named after Irish nationalist Robert Emmet.

Like much of Holt County, the Emmet area is well suited for production of wild hay. Early settlers cut it as a cash crop; in the 1920s, the Emmet-Elkhorn Valley Hay Company was founded; its name was later abbreviated to the Emmet Hay Company. The community describes itself as the "Biggest Little Haytown in the World".

== Geography ==
According to the United States Census Bureau, the village has a total area of 0.26 square miles (0.67 km^{2}), all land.

== Demographics ==
Historical population
Census	Pop.	Note	%±
1920	130		—
1930	88		−32.3%
1940	89		1.1%
1950	62		−30.3%
1960	66		6.5%
1970	70		6.1%
1980	73		4.3%
1990	70		−4.1%
2000	77		10.0%
2010	48		−37.7%
2020	46		−4.2%
U.S. Decennial Census

=== 2010 census ===
As of the census of 2010, there were 48 people, 20 households, and 13 families living in the village. The population density was 184.6 inhabitants per square mile (71.3/km^{2}). There were 24 housing units at an average density of 92.3 per square mile (35.6/km^{2}). The racial makeup of the village was 100.0% White.

There were 20 households, of which 20.0% had children under the age of 18 living with them, 65.0% were married couples living together, and 35.0% were non-families. 35.0% of all households were made up of individuals, and 25% had someone living alone who was 65 years of age or older. The average household size was 2.40 and the average family size was 3.15.

The median age in the village was 49.5 years. 29.2% of residents were under the age of 18; 2.1% were between the ages of 18 and 24; 8.4% were from 25 to 44; 45.9% were from 45 to 64; and 14.6% were 65 years of age or older. The gender makeup of the village was 47.9% male and 52.1% female.

=== 2000 census ===
As of the census of 2000, there were 77 people, 26 households, and 21 families living in the village. The population density was 296.7 inhabitants per square mile (114.6/km^{2}). There were 28 housing units at an average density of 107.9 per square mile (41.7/km^{2}). The racial makeup of the village was 96.10% White, 1.30% African American, 2.60% from other races.

There were 26 households, out of which 38.5% had children under the age of 18 living with them, 73.1% were married couples living together, 3.8% had a female householder with no husband present, and 19.2% were non-families. 19.2% of all households were made up of individuals, and 15.4% had someone living alone who was 65 years of age or older. The average household size was 2.96 and the average family size was 3.43.

In the village, the population was spread out, with 36.4% under the age of 18, 3.9% from 18 to 24, 24.7% from 25 to 44, 20.8% from 45 to 64, and 14.3% who were 65 years of age or older. The median age was 38 years. For every 100 females, there were 120.0 males. For every 100 females age 18 and over, there were 104.2 males.

As of 2000 the median income for a household in the village was $36,250, and the median income for a family was $36,875. Males had a median income of $31,875 versus $24,583 for females. The per capita income for the village was $11,074. There were 23.8% of families and 27.4% of the population living below the poverty line, including 40.0% of under eighteens and 44.4% of those over 64.

== See also ==
- List of municipalities in Nebraska
