= Deloit, Nebraska =

Unincorporated community in Nebraska, United States

- Unincorporated Community
- Location within Nebraska Location within the United States
- Coordinates: 42.1°N 98.3°W
- Country: United States
- State: Nebraska
- County: Holt

Deloit is an unincorporated community in Holt County, Nebraska, United States.

== History ==
A post office was established at Deloit in the 1870s. Deloit was likely named after Deloit, Iowa.
