= Stuart, Nebraska =

- Village
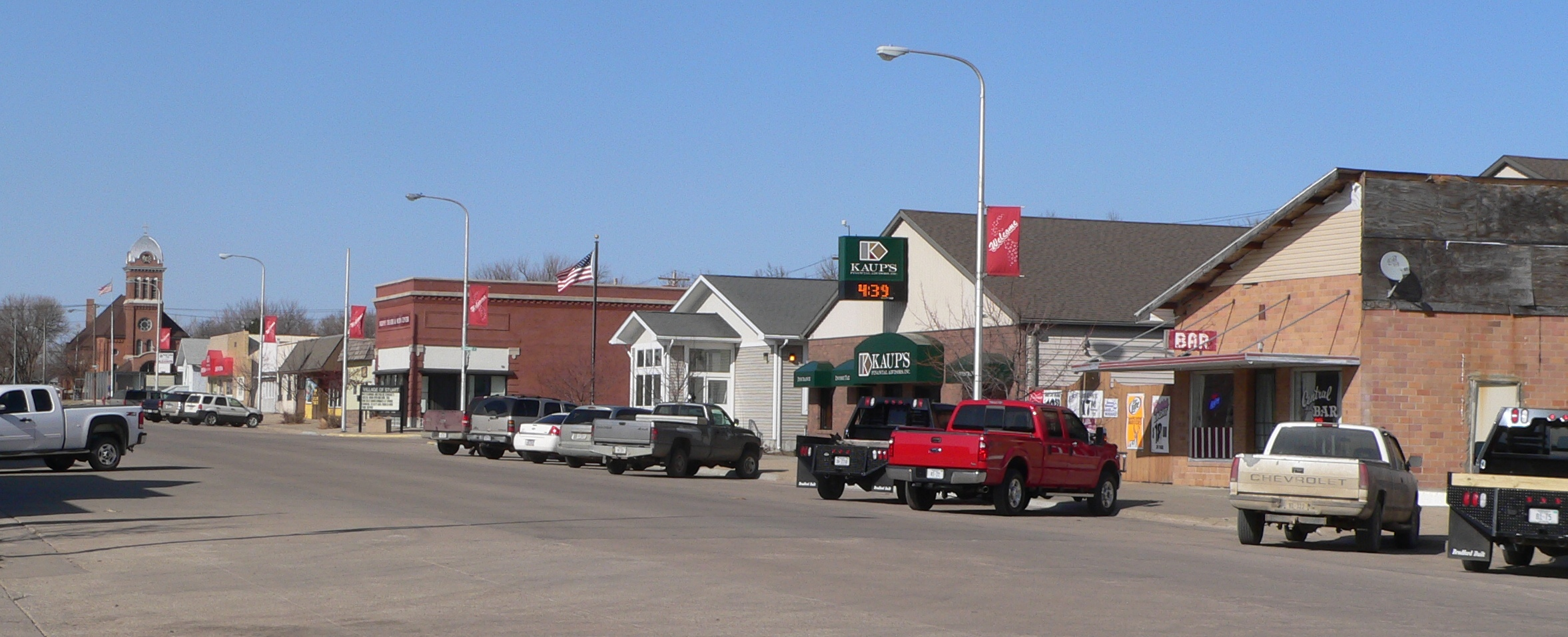
- Downtown Stuart: Main Street

- Location of Stuart, Nebraska
- Coordinates: 42°36′03″N 99°08′26″W
- Country: United States
- State: Nebraska
- County: Holt

Area
  - Total: 1.37 sq mi (3.54 km^{2})
  - Land: 1.37 sq mi (3.54 km^{2})
  - Water: 0 sq mi (0.00 km^{2})
- Elevation: 2,162 ft (659 m)

Population (2020)
  - Total: 486
  - Density: 355.7/sq mi (137.32/km^{2})
- Time zone: UTC-6 (Central (CST))
  - Summer (DST): UTC-5 (CDT)
- ZIP code: 68780
- Area code: 402
- FIPS code: 31-47500
- GNIS feature ID: 2399923

Stuart is a village in Holt County, Nebraska, United States. As of the 2020 census, Stuart had a population of 486.

== History ==
Stuart was first settled in 1879. The town was named for Peter Stuart, the first postmaster. Stuart grew around a depot established in 1881 on the Fremont, Elkhorn and Missouri Valley Railroad.

== Geography ==
According to the United States Census Bureau, the village has a total area of 1.34 square miles (3.47 km^{2}), all land.

== Demographics ==
Historical population
Census	Pop.	Note	%±
1890	245		—
1900	382		55.9%
1910	467		22.3%
1920	739		58.2%
1930	763		3.2%
1940	760		−0.4%
1950	785		3.3%
1960	794		1.1%
1970	561		−29.3%
1980	641		14.3%
1990	650		1.4%
2000	625		−3.8%
2010	590		−5.6%
2020	486		−17.6%
U.S. Decennial Census

=== 2010 census ===
As of the census of 2010, there were 590 people, 238 households, and 146 families living in the village. The population density was 440.3 inhabitants per square mile (170.0/km^{2}). There were 267 housing units at an average density of 199.3 per square mile (77.0/km^{2}). The racial makeup of the village was 99.0% White, 0.2% African American, 0.2% Asian, and 0.7% from two or more races. Hispanic or Latino of any race were 0.7% of the population.

There were 238 households, of which 28.2% had children under the age of 18 living with them, 53.4% were married couples living together, 4.6% had a female householder with no husband present, 3.4% had a male householder with no wife present, and 38.7% were non-families. 34.9% of all households were made up of individuals, and 18.5% had someone living alone who was 65 years of age or older. The average household size was 2.31 and the average family size was 3.01.

The median age in the village was 47 years. 22.9% of residents were under the age of 18; 6.4% were between the ages of 18 and 24; 17.6% were from 25 to 44; 26.2% were from 45 to 64; and 26.8% were 65 years of age or older. The gender makeup of the village was 49.0% male and 51.0% female.

=== 2000 census ===
As of the census of 2000, there were 625 people, 237 households, and 154 families living in the village. The population density was 1,000.5 inhabitants per square mile (386.3/km^{2}). There were 272 housing units at an average density of 435.4 per square mile (168.1/km^{2}). The racial makeup of the village was 98.24% White, 0.96% Native American, 0.32% Asian, 0.16% Pacific Islander, and 0.32% from two or more races. Hispanic or Latino of any race were 0.64% of the population.

There were 237 households, out of which 30.8% had children under the age of 18 living with them, 55.3% were married couples living together, 5.9% had a female householder with no husband present, and 34.6% were non-families. 32.5% of all households were made up of individuals, and 18.1% had someone living alone who was 65 years of age or older. The average household size was 2.46 and the average family size was 3.14.

In the village, the population was spread out, with 27.7% under the age of 18, 5.3% from 18 to 24, 24.8% from 25 to 44, 16.3% from 45 to 64, and 25.9% who were 65 years of age or older. The median age was 39 years. For every 100 females, there were 100.3 males. For every 100 females age 18 and over, there were 93.2 males.

As of 2000 the median income for a household in the village was $27,321, and the median income for a family was $38,500. Males had a median income of $24,063 versus $16,667 for females. The per capita income for the village was $13,342. About 12.7% of families and 12.6% of the population were below the poverty line, including 13.2% of those under age 18 and 9.9% of those age 65 or over.
