= Martin Township, Hall County, Nebraska =

Martin Township
- Township
- Location within Nebraska
- Coordinates: 40°43′10″N 98°35′52″W
- Country: United States
- State: Nebraska
- County: Hall

Area
  - Total: 39.3 sq mi (101.8 km^{2})
  - Land: 38.1 sq mi (98.7 km^{2})
  - Water: 1.2 sq mi (3.2 km^{2})
- Elevation: 2,011 ft (613 m)

Population (2020)
  - Total: 151
  - Density: 3.96/sq mi (1.53/km^{2})
- Time zone: UTC-6 (Central (CST))
  - Summer (DST): UTC-5 (CDT)
- Area code: 308
- FIPS code: 31-30870
- GNIS feature ID: 838131

Martin Township is a township in Hall, Nebraska, United States. The population was 151 at the 2020 census.
