= Oneida Township, Kearney County, Nebraska =

Oneida Township
- Township
- Location in Kearney County
- Coordinates: 40°23′34″N 099°06′59″W
- Country: United States
- State: Nebraska
- County: Kearney

Area
  - Total: 36.19 sq mi (93.73 km^{2})
  - Land: 36.19 sq mi (93.73 km^{2})
  - Water: 0 sq mi (0 km^{2}) 0%
- Elevation: 2,228 ft (679 m)

Population (2020)
  - Total: 456
  - Density: 12.6/sq mi (4.87/km^{2})
- GNIS feature ID: 0838175

Oneida Township is one of fourteen townships in Kearney County, Nebraska, United States. The population was 456 at the 2020 census. A 2021 estimate placed the township's population at 452.

The Village of Wilcox lies within the Township.

== See also ==
- County government in Nebraska
