= Chambers Township, Holt County, Nebraska =

Chambers Township
- Township
- Location in Holt County
- Coordinates: 42°13′08″N 098°46′04″W
- Country: United States
- State: Nebraska
- County: Holt

Area
  - Total: 72.07 sq mi (186.67 km^{2})
  - Land: 72.07 sq mi (186.67 km^{2})
  - Water: 0 sq mi (0 km^{2}) 0%
- Elevation: 2,090 ft (637 m)

Population (2020)
  - Total: 431
  - Density: 5.98/sq mi (2.31/km^{2})
- ZIP code: 68725
- Area codes: 402 and 531
- GNIS feature ID: 0837914

Chambers Township is one of thirty-seven townships in Holt County, Nebraska, United States. The population was 431 at the 2020 census. A 2023 estimate placed the township's population at 428.

The Village of Chambers lies within the Township.

== See also ==
- County government in Nebraska
