= Rock Falls Township, Holt County, Nebraska =

Rock Falls Township
- Township
- Location in Holt County
- Coordinates: 42°38′03″N 098°42′18″W
- Country: United States
- State: Nebraska
- County: Holt

Area
  - Total: 36.0 sq mi (93.3 km^{2})
  - Land: 36.0 sq mi (93.3 km^{2})
  - Water: 0 sq mi (0 km^{2}) 0%
- Elevation: 1,942 ft (592 m)

Population (2020)
  - Total: 45
  - Density: 1.2/sq mi (0.48/km^{2})
- ZIP code: 68763
- Area codes: 402 and 531
- GNIS feature ID: 0838217

Rock Falls Township is one of thirty-seven townships in Holt County, Nebraska, United States. The population was 45 at the 2020 census. A 2021 estimate placed the township's population at 45.

== See also ==
- County government in Nebraska
