= Lake Township, Holt County, Nebraska =

Lake Township
- Township
- Location in Holt County
- Coordinates: 42°08′03″N 098°35′00″W
- Country: United States
- State: Nebraska
- County: Holt

Area
  - Total: 54.20 sq mi (140.39 km^{2})
  - Land: 53.9 sq mi (139.6 km^{2})
  - Water: 0.30 sq mi (0.78 km^{2}) 0.56%
- Elevation: 2,024 ft (617 m)

Population (2020)
  - Total: 56
  - Density: 1.0/sq mi (0.40/km^{2})
- GNIS feature ID: 0838081

Lake Township is one of thirty-seven townships in Holt County, Nebraska, United States. The population was 56 at the 2020 census. A 2021 estimate placed the township's population at 56.

== See also ==
- County government in Nebraska
