= Inman, Nebraska =

- Village
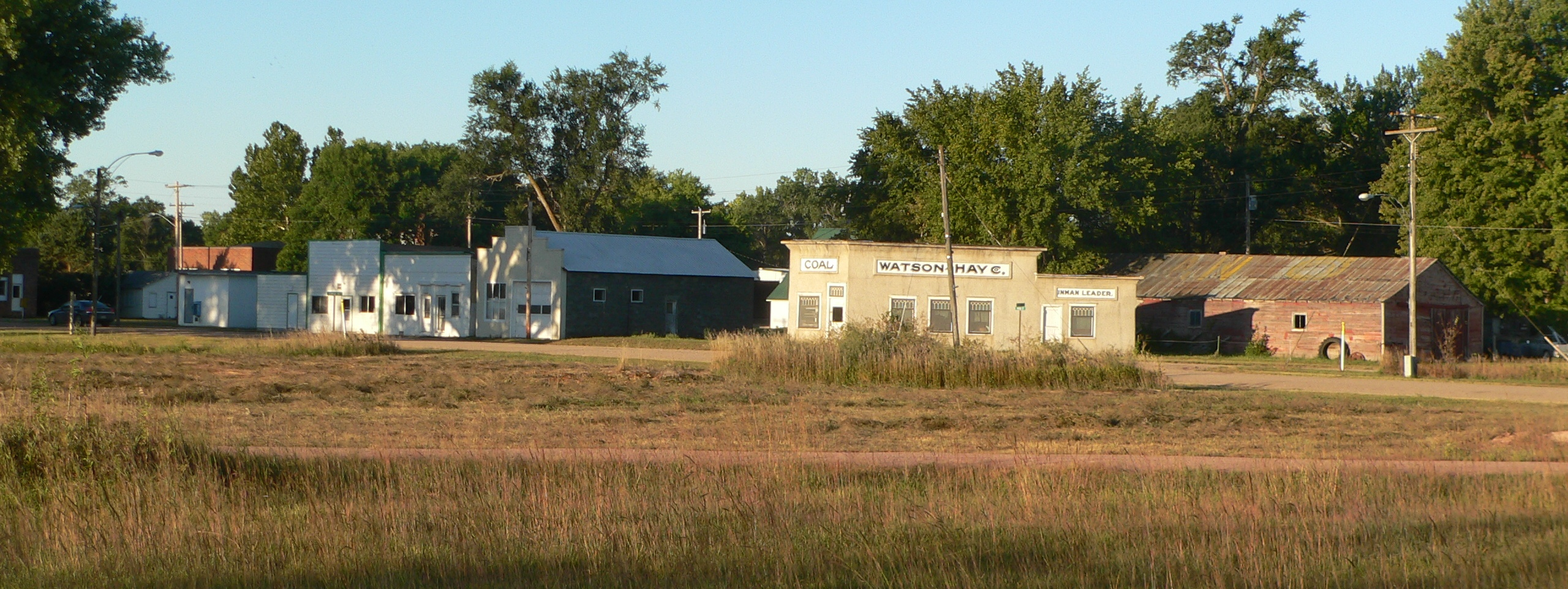
- Inman, seen from U.S. Highway 20/275

- Location of Inman, Nebraska
- Coordinates: 42°22′55″N 98°31′47″W
- Country: United States
- State: Nebraska
- County: Holt

Area
  - Total: 0.29 sq mi (0.74 km^{2})
  - Land: 0.29 sq mi (0.74 km^{2})
  - Water: 0 sq mi (0.00 km^{2})
- Elevation: 1,929 ft (588 m)

Population (2020)
  - Total: 95
  - Density: 332.2/sq mi (128.28/km^{2})
- Time zone: UTC-6 (Central (CST))
  - Summer (DST): UTC-5 (CDT)
- ZIP code: 68742
- Area code: 402
- FIPS code: 31-24075
- GNIS feature ID: 2398576

Inman is a village in Holt County, Nebraska, United States. As of the 2020 census, Inman had a population of 95.

== History ==
Inman was platted in 1881 when the Fremont, Elkhorn and Missouri Valley Railroad was extended to that point. It was named for William H. Inman, a pioneer settler.

== Geography ==
According to the United States Census Bureau, the village has a total area of 0.29 square miles (0.75 km^{2}), all land.

The community is located on combined U.S. routes 20 and 275, southeast of O'Neill.

== Demographics ==
Historical population
Census	Pop.	Note	%±
1920	315		—
1930	285		−9.5%
1940	206		−27.7%
1950	237		15.0%
1960	192		−19.0%
1970	160		−16.7%
1980	181		13.1%
1990	159		−12.2%
2000	148		−6.9%
2010	129		−12.8%
2020	95		−26.4%
U.S. Decennial Census

=== 2010 census ===
As of the census of 2010, there were 129 people, 56 households, and 35 families living in the village. The population density was 444.8 inhabitants per square mile (171.7/km^{2}). There were 63 housing units at an average density of 217.2 per square mile (83.9/km^{2}). The racial makeup of the village was 97.7% White, 0.8% Native American, and 1.6% Asian. Hispanic or Latino of any race were 0.8% of the population.

There were 56 households, of which 25.0% had children under the age of 18 living with them, 44.6% were married couples living together, 12.5% had a female householder with no husband present, 5.4% had a male householder with no wife present, and 37.5% were non-families. 30.4% of all households were made up of individuals, and 12.5% had someone living alone who was 65 years of age or older. The average household size was 2.30 and the average family size was 2.83.

The median age in the village was 46.5 years. 24.8% of residents were under the age of 18; 7% were between the ages of 18 and 24; 17.9% were from 25 to 44; 31.1% were from 45 to 64; and 19.4% were 65 years of age or older. The gender makeup of the village was 51.2% male and 48.8% female.

=== 2000 census ===
As of the census of 2000, there were 148 people, 62 households, and 43 families living in the village. The population density was 514.0 inhabitants per square mile (198.5/km^{2}). There were 66 housing units at an average density of 229.2 per square mile (88.5/km^{2}). The racial makeup of the village was 95.27% White, 2.70% Pacific Islander, and 2.03% from two or more races. Hispanic or Latino of any race were 2.70% of the population.

There were 62 households, out of which 30.6% had children under the age of 18 living with them, 58.1% were married couples living together, 8.1% had a female householder with no husband present, and 30.6% were non-families. 27.4% of all households were made up of individuals, and 14.5% had someone living alone who was 65 years of age or older. The average household size was 2.39 and the average family size was 2.91.

In the village, the population was spread out, with 27.0% under the age of 18, 3.4% from 18 to 24, 23.0% from 25 to 44, 27.7% from 45 to 64, and 18.9% who were 65 years of age or older. The median age was 41 years. For every 100 females, there were 108.5 males. For every 100 females age 18 and over, there were 96.4 males.

As of 2000 the median income for a household in the village was $26,250, and the median income for a family was $33,750. Males had a median income of $21,964 versus $14,583 for females. The per capita income for the village was $10,688. There were 17.5% of families and 25.0% of the population living below the poverty line, including 31.1% of under eighteens and 36.8% of those over 64.
