= Saratoga Township, Holt County, Nebraska =

Saratoga Township
- Township
- Location in Holt County
- Coordinates: 42°45′53″N 098°50′26″W
- Country: United States
- State: Nebraska
- County: Holt

Area
  - Total: 53.54 sq mi (138.67 km^{2})
  - Land: 53.5 sq mi (138.5 km^{2})
  - Water: 0.062 sq mi (0.16 km^{2}) 0.12%
- Elevation: 1,873 ft (571 m)

Population (2020)
  - Total: 43
  - Density: 0.80/sq mi (0.31/km^{2})
- GNIS feature ID: 0838229

Saratoga Township is one of thirty-seven townships in Holt County, Nebraska, United States. The population was 43 at the 2020 census. A 2021 estimate placed the township's population at 43.

== See also ==
- County government in Nebraska
