= Scott Township, Holt County, Nebraska =

Scott Township
- Township
- Location in Holt County
- Coordinates: 42°42′03″N 098°29′04″W
- Country: United States
- State: Nebraska
- County: Holt

Area
  - Total: 66.47 sq mi (172.15 km^{2})
  - Land: 66.10 sq mi (171.19 km^{2})
  - Water: 0.37 sq mi (0.96 km^{2}) 0.56%
- Elevation: 1,709 ft (521 m)

Population (2020)
  - Total: 41
  - Density: 0.62/sq mi (0.24/km^{2})
- GNIS feature ID: 0838237

Scott Township is one of thirty-seven townships in Holt County, Nebraska, United States. The population was 41 at the 2020 census. A 2021 estimate placed the township's population at 41.

== See also ==
- County government in Nebraska
