= Platte Township, Dodge County, Nebraska =

Platte Township
- Township
- Location in Dodge County
- Coordinates: 41°27′03″N 096°33′58″W
- Country: United States
- State: Nebraska
- County: Dodge

Area
  - Total: 37.93 sq mi (98.24 km^{2})
  - Land: 33.8 sq mi (87.6 km^{2})
  - Water: 4.11 sq mi (10.64 km^{2}) 10.83%
- Elevation: 1,217 ft (371 m)

Population (2020)
  - Total: 2,249
  - Density: 66.5/sq mi (25.7/km^{2})
- GNIS feature ID: 0838190

Platte Township is one of fourteen townships in Dodge County, Nebraska, United States. The population was 2,249 at the 2020 census. A 2021 estimate placed the township's population at 2,188.

The Village of Inglewood lies within the Township.

== See also ==
- County government in Nebraska
