= Grattan Township, Holt County, Nebraska =

Township in Nebraska, United States

Grattan Township
- Township
- Location in Holt County
- Coordinates: 42°26′35″N 098°40′02″W
- Country: United States
- State: Nebraska
- County: Holt

Area
  - Total: 117 sq mi (304 km^{2})
  - Land: 117.37 sq mi (303.99 km^{2})
  - Water: 0.0039 sq mi (0.01 km^{2}) 0%
- Elevation: 1,975 ft (602 m)

Population (2020)
  - Total: 843
  - Density: 7.18/sq mi (2.77/km^{2})
- GNIS feature ID: 0838041

Grattan Township is one of thirty-seven townships in Holt County, Nebraska, United States. The population was 843 at the 2020 census. A 2021 estimate placed the township's population at 833.

== See also ==
- County government in Nebraska
