= Council Creek Township, Nance County, Nebraska =

Council Creek Township
- Township
- Location in Nance County
- Coordinates: 41°24′45″N 097°53′26″W
- Country: United States
- State: Nebraska
- County: Nance

Area
  - Total: 35.36 sq mi (91.58 km^{2})
  - Land: 34.67 sq mi (89.79 km^{2})
  - Water: 0.69 sq mi (1.79 km^{2}) 1.95%
- Elevation: 1,716 ft (523 m)

Population (2020)
  - Total: 85
  - Density: 2.5/sq mi (0.95/km^{2})
- ZIP code: 31125
- GNIS feature ID: 0837944

Council Creek Township is one of twelve townships in Nance County, Nebraska, United States. The population was 85 at the 2020 census. A 2021 estimate placed the township's population at 86.

== See also ==
- County government in Nebraska
