= Pohocco Township, Saunders County, Nebraska =

Pohocco Township
- Township
- Location in Saunders County
- Coordinates: 41°21′36″N 096°31′18″W
- Country: United States
- State: Nebraska
- County: Saunders

Area
  - Total: 29.28 sq mi (75.84 km^{2})
  - Land: 29.17 sq mi (75.56 km^{2})
  - Water: 0.11 sq mi (0.28 km^{2}) 0.37%
- Elevation: 1,263 ft (385 m)

Population (2020)
  - Total: 1,207
  - Density: 41.37/sq mi (15.97/km^{2})
- GNIS feature ID: 0838194

Pohocco Township is one of twenty-four townships in Saunders County, Nebraska, United States. The population was 1,207 at the 2020 census. A 2021 estimate placed the township's population at 1,238.

The township was named after Pahuk, a high bluff on the south bank of the Platte River. The bluff does not actually lie within the township.

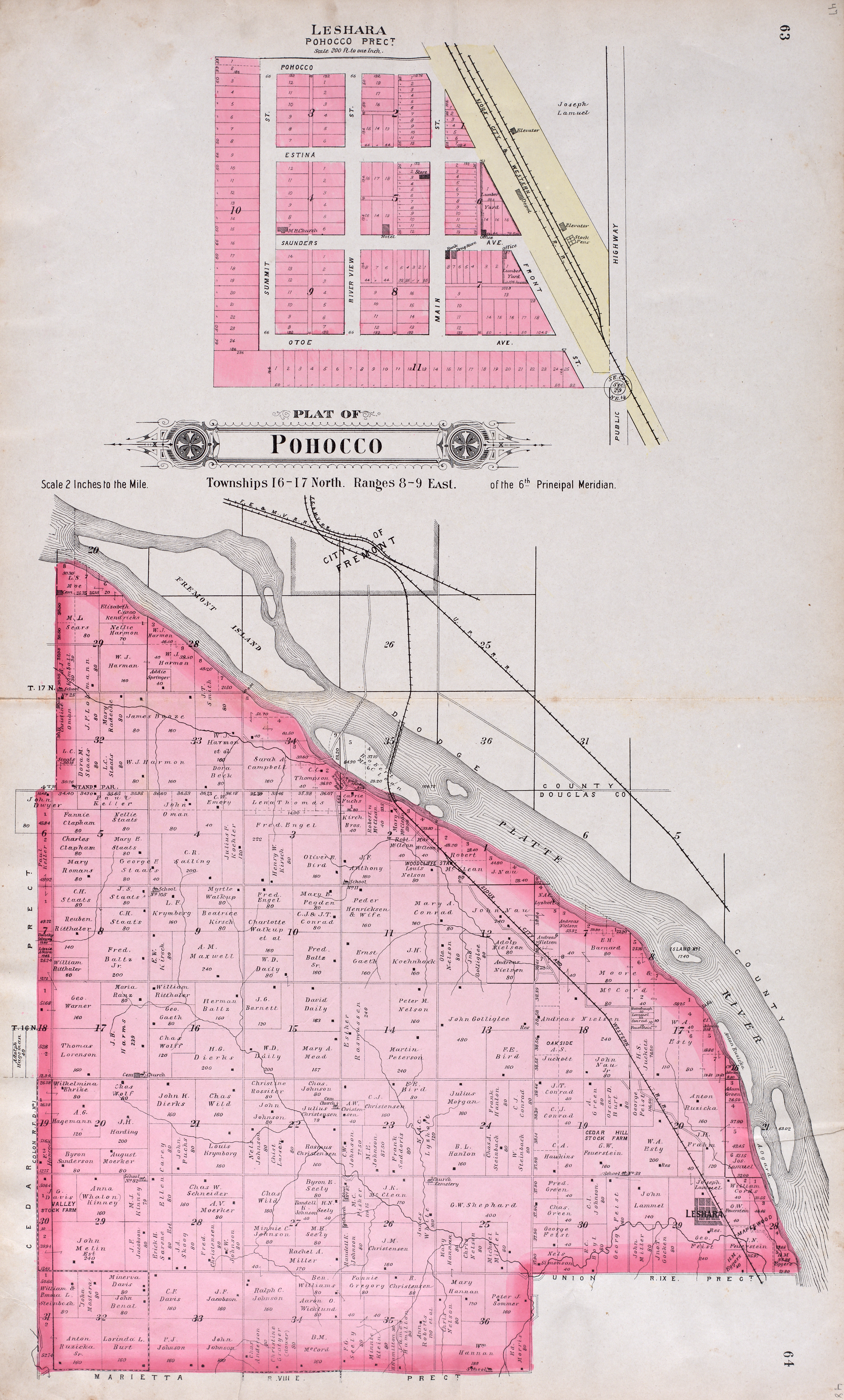
Pohocco Township located in Saunders County, Nebraska (1907)

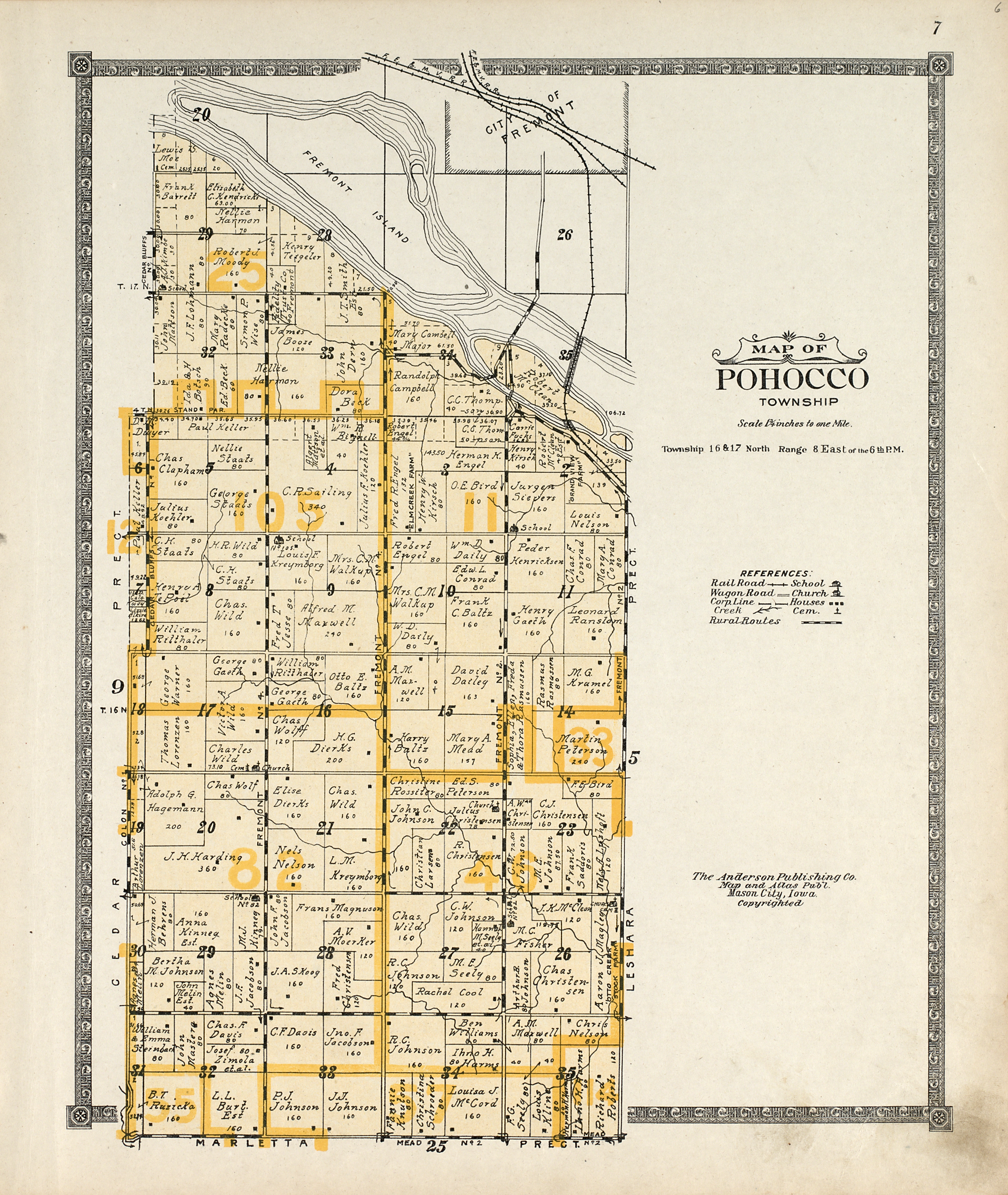
Pohocco Township located in Saunders County, Nebraska (1916)

== See also ==
- County government in Nebraska
