= Logan Township, Adams County, Nebraska =

Township in Nebraska, United States

Coordinates: 40°23′34″N 98°39′57″W

Logan Township is one of sixteen townships in Adams County, Nebraska, United States. The population was 61 at the 2020 census.

== See also ==
- County government in Nebraska
