= Lake Township, Phelps County, Nebraska =

Lake Township
- Township
- Location in Phelps County
- Coordinates: 40°23′37″N 099°14′22″W
- Country: United States
- State: Nebraska
- County: Phelps

Area
  - Total: 39.36 sq mi (101.95 km^{2})
  - Land: 39.36 sq mi (101.95 km^{2})
  - Water: 0 sq mi (0 km^{2}) 0%
- Elevation: 2,267 ft (691 m)

Population (2000)
  - Total: 171
  - Density: 4.4/sq mi (1.7/km^{2})
- GNIS feature ID: 0838082

Lake Township is one of fourteen townships in Phelps County, Nebraska, United States. The population was 171 at the 2000 census. A 2006 estimate placed the township's population at 174.
