= Logan Township, Dodge County, Nebraska =

Logan Township
- Township
- Location in Dodge County
- Coordinates: 41°42′04″N 096°29′51″W
- Country: United States
- State: Nebraska
- County: Dodge

Area
  - Total: 35.70 sq mi (92.46 km^{2})
  - Land: 35.70 sq mi (92.46 km^{2})
  - Water: 0 sq mi (0 km^{2}) 0%
- Elevation: 1,355 ft (413 m)

Population (2020)
  - Total: 448
  - Density: 12.5/sq mi (4.85/km^{2})
- GNIS feature ID: 0838106

Logan Township is one of fourteen townships in Dodge County, Nebraska, United States. The population was 448 at the 2020 census. A 2021 estimate placed the township's population at 435.

The Village of Uehling lies within the Township.

== See also ==
- County government in Nebraska
