= Logan Township, Dixon County, Nebraska =

Logan Township
- Township
- Location in Dixon County
- Coordinates: 42°18′13″N 096°57′46″W
- Country: United States
- State: Nebraska
- County: Dixon

Area
  - Total: 35.88 sq mi (92.92 km^{2})
  - Land: 35.88 sq mi (92.92 km^{2})
  - Water: 0 sq mi (0 km^{2}) 0%
- Elevation: 1,496 ft (456 m)

Population (2020)
  - Total: 197
  - Density: 5.49/sq mi (2.12/km^{2})
- GNIS feature ID: 0838105

Logan Township is one of thirteen townships in Dixon County, Nebraska, United States. The population was 197 at the 2020 census. A 2021 estimate placed the township's population at 195.

== See also ==
- County government in Nebraska
