= Oconee, Illinois =

Oconee
- Village
- Location of Oconee in Shelby County, Illinois.
- Coordinates: 39°17′11″N 89°06′24″W
- Country: United States
- State: Illinois
- County: Shelby

Area
  - Total: 0.36 sq mi (0.92 km^{2})
  - Land: 0.36 sq mi (0.92 km^{2})
  - Water: 0 sq mi (0.00 km^{2})
- Elevation: 669 ft (204 m)

Population (2020)
  - Total: 141
  - Density: 396.3/sq mi (153.01/km^{2})
- Time zone: UTC-6 (CST)
  - Summer (DST): UTC-5 (CDT)
- ZIP code: 62553
- Area code: 217
- FIPS code: 17-55132
- GNIS ID: 2399554

Oconee is a village in Shelby County, Illinois, United States. As of the 2020 census, Oconee had a population of 141.

The village was named after the daughter of a local Native American chieftain.

== Geography ==
According to the 2010 census, Oconee has a total area of 0.36 square miles (0.93 km^{2}), all land.

== Demographics ==
Historical population
Census	Pop.	Note	%±
1880	259		—
1890	332		28.2%
1900	316		−4.8%
1910	293		−7.3%
1920	318		8.5%
1930	231		−27.4%
1940	278		20.3%
1950	256		−7.9%
1960	257		0.4%
1970	218		−15.2%
1980	240		10.1%
1990	201		−16.2%
2000	202		0.5%
2010	180		−10.9%
2020	141		−21.7%
U.S. Decennial Census

As of the census of 2000, there were 202 people, 78 households, and 64 families residing in the village. The population density was 560.8 inhabitants per square mile (216.5/km^{2}). There were 86 housing units at an average density of 238.8 per square mile (92.2/km^{2}). The racial makeup of the village was 100.00% White. Hispanic or Latino of any race were 1.49% of the population.

There were 78 households, out of which 46.2% had children under the age of 18 living with them, 71.8% were married couples living together, 2.6% had a female householder with no husband present, and 17.9% were non-families. 16.7% of all households were made up of individuals, and 11.5% had someone living alone who was 65 years of age or older. The average household size was 2.59 and the average family size was 2.89.

In the village, the population was spread out, with 26.2% under the age of 18, 11.4% from 18 to 24, 23.8% from 25 to 44, 18.3% from 45 to 64, and 20.3% who were 65 years of age or older. The median age was 36 years. For every 100 females, there were 92.4 males. For every 100 females age 18 and over, there were 98.7 males.

The median income for a household in the village was $38,750, and the median income for a family was $41,250. Males had a median income of $23,750 versus $15,313 for females. The per capita income for the village was $14,068. About 3.2% of families and 3.6% of the population were below the poverty line, including 4.4% of those under the age of eighteen and 5.2% of those 65 or over.
