= Loup Ferry Township, Nance County, Nebraska =

Loup Ferry Township
- Township
- Location in Nance County
- Coordinates: 41°20′43″N 098°06′49″W
- Country: United States
- State: Nebraska
- County: Nance

Area
  - Total: 40.68 sq mi (105.37 km^{2})
  - Land: 40.31 sq mi (104.39 km^{2})
  - Water: 0.37 sq mi (0.97 km^{2}) 0.92%
- Elevation: 1,788 ft (545 m)

Population (2020)
  - Total: 73
  - Density: 1.8/sq mi (0.70/km^{2})
- GNIS feature ID: 0838117

Loup Ferry Township is one of twelve townships in Nance County, Nebraska, United States. The population was 73 at the 2020 census. A 2021 estimate placed the township's population at 73.

== See also ==
- County government in Nebraska
