= Sappa Township, Harlan County, Nebraska =

Sappa Township
- Township
- Location in Harlan County
- Coordinates: 40°07′58″N 099°34′27″W
- Country: United States
- State: Nebraska
- County: Harlan

Area
  - Total: 36.02 sq mi (93.28 km^{2})
  - Land: 35.97 sq mi (93.16 km^{2})
  - Water: 0.046 sq mi (0.12 km^{2}) 0.13%
- Elevation: 2,024 ft (617 m)

Population (2000)
  - Total: 324
  - Density: 9.1/sq mi (3.5/km^{2})
- GNIS feature ID: 0838228

Sappa Township is one of sixteen townships in Harlan County, Nebraska, United States. The population was 324 at the 2000 census. A 2006 estimate placed the township's population at 298.

The Village of Stamford lies within the Township.

== See also ==
- County government in Nebraska
