= Deloit Township, Holt County, Nebraska =

Deloit Township
- Township
- Location in Holt County
- Coordinates: 42°07′30″N 098°23′17″W
- Country: United States
- State: Nebraska
- County: Holt

Area
  - Total: 54.23 sq mi (140.46 km^{2})
  - Land: 54.2 sq mi (140.3 km^{2})
  - Water: 0.062 sq mi (0.16 km^{2}) 0.11%
- Elevation: 2,011 ft (613 m)

Population (2020)
  - Total: 106
  - Density: 1.96/sq mi (0.756/km^{2})
- GNIS feature ID: 0837961

Deloit Township is one of thirty-seven townships in Holt County, Nebraska, United States. The population was 106 at the 2020 census. A 2023 estimate placed the township's population at 105. The township centers around the area church, Rural St. Johns, a locally run and owned diner, and a gas station that still functions on a limited basis.

== See also ==
- County government in Nebraska
