= Logan Township, Burt County, Nebraska =

Logan Township
- Township
- Location in Burt County
- Coordinates: 41°58′17″N 096°24′32″W
- Country: United States
- State: Nebraska
- County: Burt

Area
  - Total: 41.43 sq mi (107.31 km^{2})
  - Land: 41.43 sq mi (107.31 km^{2})
  - Water: 0 sq mi (0 km^{2}) 0%
- Elevation: 1,257 ft (383 m)

Population (2020)
  - Total: 242
  - Density: 5.84/sq mi (2.26/km^{2})
- GNIS feature ID: 0838102

Logan Township is one of twelve townships in Burt County, Nebraska, United States. The population was 242 at the 2020 census. A 2021 estimate placed the township's population at 244.

== See also ==
- County government in Nebraska
