= Loup Township, Buffalo County, Nebraska =

Loup Township
- Township
- Location in Buffalo County
- Coordinates: 41°00′25″N 099°07′33″W
- Country: United States
- State: Nebraska
- County: Buffalo

Area
  - Total: 41.87 sq mi (108.44 km^{2})
  - Land: 41.86 sq mi (108.42 km^{2})
  - Water: 0.0077 sq mi (0.02 km^{2}) 0.02%
- Elevation: 2,130 ft (650 m)

Population (2000)
  - Total: 130
  - Density: 12/sq mi (4.8/km^{2})
- GNIS feature ID: 0838113

Loup Township is one of twenty-six townships in Buffalo County, Nebraska, United States. The population was 521 at the 2000 census. A 2006 estimate placed the township's population at 501. By 2017, population estimates put the total at 130.

The Village of Pleasanton lies within the Township.

== See also ==
- County government in Nebraska
