= Logan Township, Buffalo County, Nebraska =

Logan Township
- Township
- Location in Buffalo County
- Coordinates: 40°49′47″N 099°22′08″W
- Country: United States
- State: Nebraska
- County: Buffalo

Area
  - Total: 35.8 sq mi (92.7 km^{2})
  - Land: 35.8 sq mi (92.7 km^{2})
  - Water: 0 sq mi (0 km^{2}) 0%
- Elevation: 2,430 ft (740 m)

Population (2000)
  - Total: 114
  - Density: 3.1/sq mi (1.2/km^{2})
- GNIS feature ID: 0838101

Logan Township is one of twenty-six townships in Buffalo County, Nebraska, United States. The population was 114 at the 2000 census. A 2006 estimate placed the township's population at 112.

== See also ==
- County government in Nebraska
