= Loup Township, Merrick County, Nebraska =

Loup Township
- Township
- Location in Merrick County
- Coordinates: 41°13′39″N 098°13′09″W
- Country: United States
- State: Nebraska
- County: Merrick

Area
  - Total: 56.1 sq mi (145.4 km^{2})
  - Land: 56.04 sq mi (145.13 km^{2})
  - Water: 0.10 sq mi (0.27 km^{2}) 0.19%
- Elevation: 1,759 ft (536 m)

Population (2020)
  - Total: 739
  - Density: 13.2/sq mi (5.09/km^{2})
- GNIS feature ID: 0838115

Loup Township is one of eleven townships in Merrick County, Nebraska, United States. The population was 739 at the 2020 census. A 2021 estimate placed the township's population at 739.

The Village of Palmer lies within the Township.

== See also ==
- County government in Nebraska
