= Loup Township, Platte County, Nebraska =

Loup Township
- Township
- Location in Platte County
- Coordinates: 41°24′48″N 097°35′23″W
- Country: United States
- State: Nebraska
- County: Platte

Area
  - Total: 43.07 sq mi (111.56 km^{2})
  - Land: 42.07 sq mi (108.95 km^{2})
  - Water: 1.01 sq mi (2.61 km^{2}) 2.34%
- Elevation: 1,540 ft (470 m)

Population (2020)
  - Total: 189
  - Density: 4.49/sq mi (1.73/km^{2})
- GNIS feature ID: 0838116

Loup Township is one of eighteen townships in Platte County, Nebraska, United States. The population was 189 at the 2020 census. A 2021 estimate placed the township's population at 186.

== History ==
Loup Township was established in 1880.

== See also ==
- County government in Nebraska
