= Logan Township, Antelope County, Nebraska =

Logan Township
- Township
- Location in Antelope County
- Coordinates: 41°57′38″N 098°07′28″W
- Country: United States
- State: Nebraska
- County: Antelope

Area
  - Total: 35.62 sq mi (92.25 km^{2})
  - Land: 35.62 sq mi (92.25 km^{2})
  - Water: 0 sq mi (0 km^{2}) 0%
- Elevation: 1,991 ft (607 m)

Population (2010)
  - Total: 811
  - Density: 23/sq mi (8.8/km^{2})
- GNIS feature ID: 0838100

Logan Township is one of twenty-four townships in Antelope County, Nebraska, United States. The population was 811 at the 2010 census.

The city of Elgin lies within the township.

== See also ==
- County government in Nebraska
