= Logan Township, Knox County, Nebraska =

Logan Township
- Township
- Location in Knox County
- Coordinates: 42°28′57″N 098°08′02″W
- Country: United States
- State: Nebraska
- County: Knox

Area
  - Total: 35.85 sq mi (92.86 km^{2})
  - Land: 35.70 sq mi (92.47 km^{2})
  - Water: 0.15 sq mi (0.4 km^{2}) 0.43%
- Elevation: 1,631 ft (497 m)

Population (2020)
  - Total: 61
  - Density: 1.7/sq mi (0.66/km^{2})
- GNIS feature ID: 0838109

Logan Township is one of thirty townships in Knox County, Nebraska, United States. The population was 61 at the 2020 census. A 2023 estimate placed the township's population at 60.

== See also ==
- County government in Nebraska
