= Logan Township, Kearney County, Nebraska =

Logan Township
- Township
- Location in Kearney County
- Coordinates: 40°34′09″N 099°00′23″W
- Country: United States
- State: Nebraska
- County: Kearney

Area
  - Total: 36.07 sq mi (93.42 km^{2})
  - Land: 36.07 sq mi (93.42 km^{2})
  - Water: 0 sq mi (0 km^{2}) 0%
- Elevation: 2,172 ft (662 m)

Population (2020)
  - Total: 206
  - Density: 5.71/sq mi (2.21/km^{2})
- GNIS feature ID: 0838108

Logan Township is one of fourteen townships in Kearney County, Nebraska, United States. The population was 206 at the 2020 census. A 2021 estimate placed the township's population at 204.

== See also ==
- County government in Nebraska
