= Loup Township, Custer County, Nebraska =

Loup Township
- Township
- Location in Custer County
- Coordinates: 41°07′57″N 099°32′47″W
- Country: United States
- State: Nebraska
- County: Custer

Area
  - Total: 143.07 sq mi (370.55 km^{2})
  - Land: 143.04 sq mi (370.46 km^{2})
  - Water: 0.035 sq mi (0.09 km^{2}) 0.02%
- Elevation: 2,425 ft (739 m)

Population (2020)
  - Total: 110
  - Density: 0.77/sq mi (0.30/km^{2})
- GNIS feature ID: 0838114

Loup Township is one of thirty-one townships in Custer County, Nebraska, United States. The population was 110 at the 2020 census. A 2021 estimate placed the township's population at 109.

== See also ==
- County government in Nebraska
