= Logan Township, Cuming County, Nebraska =

Logan Township
- Township
- Location in Cuming County
- Coordinates: 41°57′10″N 096°44′02″W
- Country: United States
- State: Nebraska
- County: Cuming

Area
  - Total: 35.92 sq mi (93.02 km^{2})
  - Land: 35.92 sq mi (93.02 km^{2})
  - Water: 0 sq mi (0 km^{2}) 0%
- Elevation: 1,430 ft (436 m)

Population (2020)
  - Total: 162
  - Density: 4.51/sq mi (1.74/km^{2})
- GNIS feature ID: 0838104

Logan Township is one of sixteen townships in Cuming County, Nebraska, United States. The population was 162 at the 2020 census. A 2021 estimate placed the township's population at 161.

== See also ==
- County government in Nebraska
