= Ewing, Nebraska =

Village in Holt County, Nebraska, United States

- Village
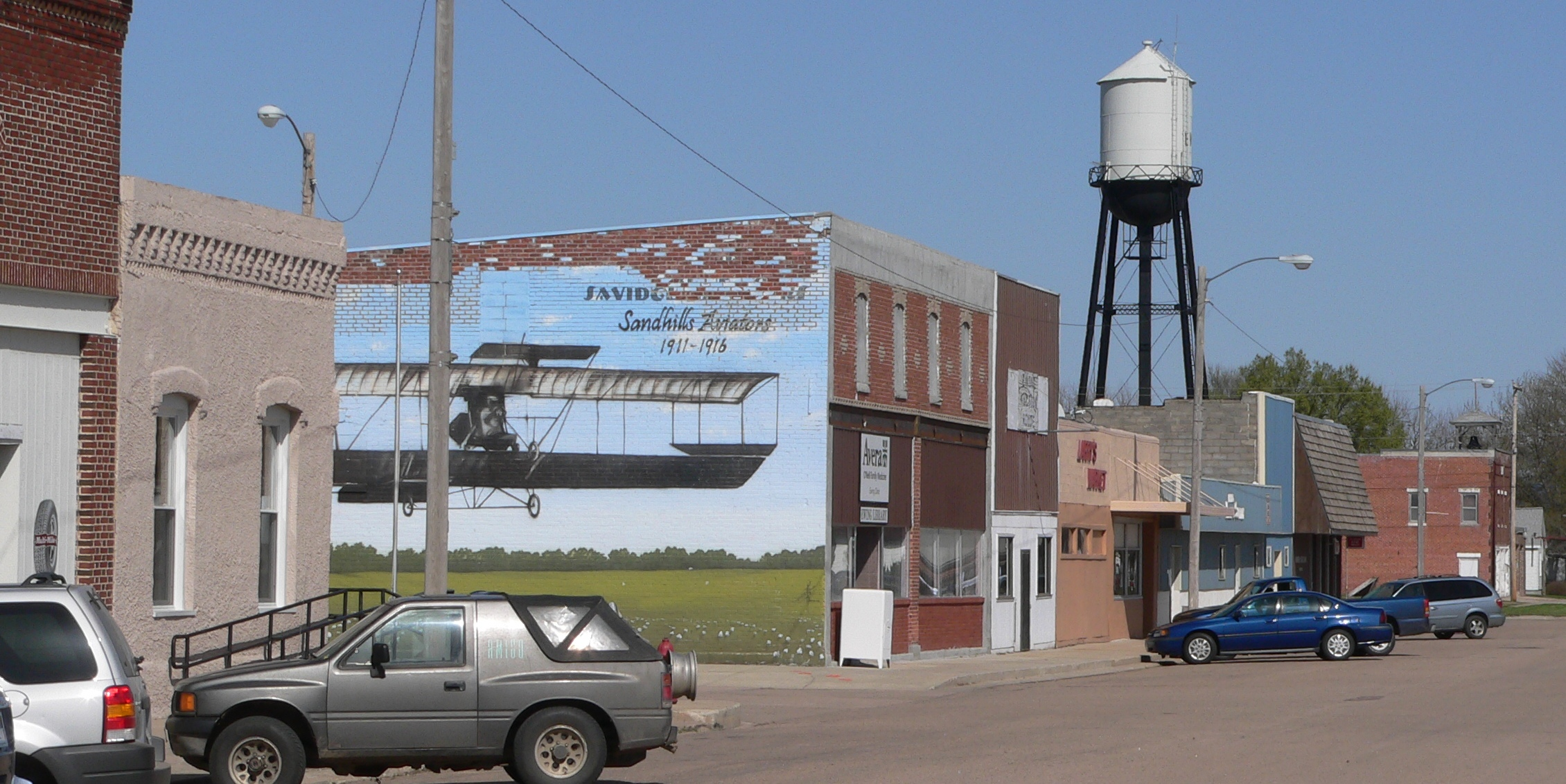
- Downtown Ewing, with mural commemorating the Savidge brothers, early Nebraska aviators

- Location of Ewing, Nebraska
- Coordinates: 42°15′34″N 98°20′37″W
- Country: United States
- State: Nebraska
- County: Holt

Area
  - Total: 0.44 sq mi (1.15 km^{2})
  - Land: 0.44 sq mi (1.15 km^{2})
  - Water: 0 sq mi (0.00 km^{2})
- Elevation: 1,854 ft (565 m)

Population (2020)
  - Total: 373
  - Density: 837.0/sq mi (323.16/km^{2})
- Time zone: UTC−06:00 (Central (CST))
  - Summer (DST): UTC−05:00 (CDT)
- ZIP code: 68735
- Area code: 402
- FIPS code: 31-16270
- GNIS feature ID: 2398848

Ewing is a village in Holt County, Nebraska, United States. As of the 2020 census, Ewing had a population of 373.

== History ==
Ewing was platted in 1882 when the Fremont, Elkhorn and Missouri Valley Railroad was extended to that point. It was named for its postmaster, James Ewing.

== Geography ==
According to the United States Census Bureau, the village has a total area of 0.45 square miles (1.17 km^{2}), all land.

=== Climate ===
Climate data for Ewing, Nebraska (1991–2020)
Month	Jan	Feb	Mar	Apr	May	Jun	Jul	Aug	Sep	Oct	Nov	Dec	Year
Mean daily maximum °F (°C)	35.4 (1.9)	39.7 (4.3)	52.1 (11.2)	63.0 (17.2)	73.4 (23.0)	83.2 (28.4)	87.9 (31.1)	85.7 (29.8)	79.1 (26.2)	65.6 (18.7)	49.4 (9.7)	37.2 (2.9)	62.6 (17.0)
Daily mean °F (°C)	22.9 (−5.1)	26.6 (−3.0)	38.0 (3.3)	48.6 (9.2)	59.9 (15.5)	69.8 (21.0)	74.7 (23.7)	72.4 (22.4)	64.3 (17.9)	51.0 (10.6)	36.4 (2.4)	25.4 (−3.7)	49.2 (9.5)
Mean daily minimum °F (°C)	10.3 (−12.1)	13.5 (−10.3)	23.8 (−4.6)	34.1 (1.2)	46.3 (7.9)	56.4 (13.6)	61.5 (16.4)	59.2 (15.1)	49.6 (9.8)	36.4 (2.4)	23.4 (−4.8)	13.6 (−10.2)	35.7 (2.0)
Average precipitation inches (mm)	0.56 (14)	0.72 (18)	1.39 (35)	3.02 (77)	4.08 (104)	3.91 (99)	3.22 (82)	3.23 (82)	2.23 (57)	2.07 (53)	0.90 (23)	0.74 (19)	26.07 (663)
Average snowfall inches (cm)	5.8 (15)	7.9 (20)	4.2 (11)	3.8 (9.7)	0.1 (0.25)	0.0 (0.0)	0.0 (0.0)	0.0 (0.0)	0.0 (0.0)	0.7 (1.8)	3.3 (8.4)	5.9 (15)	31.7 (81.15)
Source: NOAA

== Demographics ==
Historical population
Census	Pop.	Note	%±
1890	348		—
1900	275		−21.0%
1910	440		60.0%
1920	543		23.4%
1930	588		8.3%
1940	681		15.8%
1950	705		3.5%
1960	583		−17.3%
1970	552		−5.3%
1980	520		−5.8%
1990	449		−13.7%
2000	433		−3.6%
2010	387		−10.6%
2020	373		−3.6%
U.S. Decennial Census

=== 2010 census ===
As of the 2010 United States census of 2010, there were 387 people, 165 households, and 103 families living in the village. The population density was 860.0 inhabitants per square mile (332.0/km^{2}). There were 195 housing units at an average density of 433.3 per square mile (167.3/km^{2}). The racial makeup of the village was 99.5% White and 0.5% from two or more races.

There were 165 households, of which 28.5% had children under the age of 18 living with them, 53.3% were married couples living together, 6.1% had a female householder with no husband present, 3.0% had a male householder with no wife present, and 37.6% were non-families. 31.5% of all households were made up of individuals, and 12.1% had someone living alone who was 65 years of age or older. The average household size was 2.35 and the average family size was 2.97.

The median age in the village was 45.2 years. 24.3% of residents were under the age of 18; 6.7% were between the ages of 18 and 24; 18.9% were from 25 to 44; 29.5% were from 45 to 64; and 20.7% were 65 years of age or older. The gender makeup of the village was 51.4% male and 48.6% female.

=== 2000 census ===
As of the 2000 United States census of 2000, there were 433 people, 192 households, and 115 families living in the village. The population density was 1,066.2 inhabitants per square mile (411.7/km^{2}). There were 213 housing units at an average density of 524.5 per square mile (202.5/km^{2}). The racial makeup of the village was 100.00% White.

There were 192 households, out of which 29.2% had children under the age of 18 living with them, 45.3% were married couples living together, 11.5% had a female householder with no husband present, and 39.6% were non-families. 37.5% of all households were made up of individuals, and 22.9% had someone living alone who was 65 years of age or older. The average household size was 2.26 and the average family size was 3.03.

In the village, the population was spread out, with 27.0% under the age of 18, 6.2% from 18 to 24, 24.5% from 25 to 44, 22.9% from 45 to 64, and 19.4% who were 65 years of age or older. The median age was 40 years. For every 100 females, there were 97.7 males. For every 100 females age 18 and over, there were 91.5 males.

As of 2000 the median income for a household in the village was $24,375, and the median income for a family was $35,000. Males had a median income of $23,571 versus $13,125 for females. The per capita income for the village was $13,605. About 9.8% of families and 13.9% of the population were below the poverty line, including 15.0% of those under age 18 and 14.1% of those age 65 or over.

== Education ==
Summerland Public Schools formed in 2020 after absorbing the Ewing school district.

Ewing was formerly in Ewing Public Schools.

Ewing High School is known for its sports, winning several state championships in recent years. It has won golf in 2003, 2005, and 2006, boys' basketball in 2006 and 2010, girls' basketball in 2007, 2008, and 2009. To add to their success in recent years the school has also won state championships in football and volleyball in 2008. In the 2008–2009 school year Ewing High School won the 2009 US Cellular Cup for being the best overall school for state activities. With the exception of the 2010 Boys Basketball team, Ewing High School has won the sportsmanship award in every state championship basketball season. Ewing High School won the 2010 US Cellular Cup for the boys division.

== See also ==
- List of municipalities in Nebraska
