= Logan Township, Gage County, Nebraska =

Logan Township
- Township
- Location in Gage County
- Coordinates: 40°18′13″N 096°37′34″W
- Country: United States
- State: Nebraska
- County: Gage

Area
  - Total: 35.80 sq mi (92.71 km^{2})
  - Land: 35.53 sq mi (92.03 km^{2})
  - Water: 0.27 sq mi (0.69 km^{2}) 0.74%
- Elevation: 1,410 ft (430 m)

Population (2020)
  - Total: 247
  - Density: 6.95/sq mi (2.68/km^{2})
- GNIS feature ID: 0838107

Logan Township is one of twenty-four townships in Gage County, Nebraska, United States. The population was 247 at the 2020 census. A 2021 estimate placed the township's population at 247.
