= County government in Nebraska =

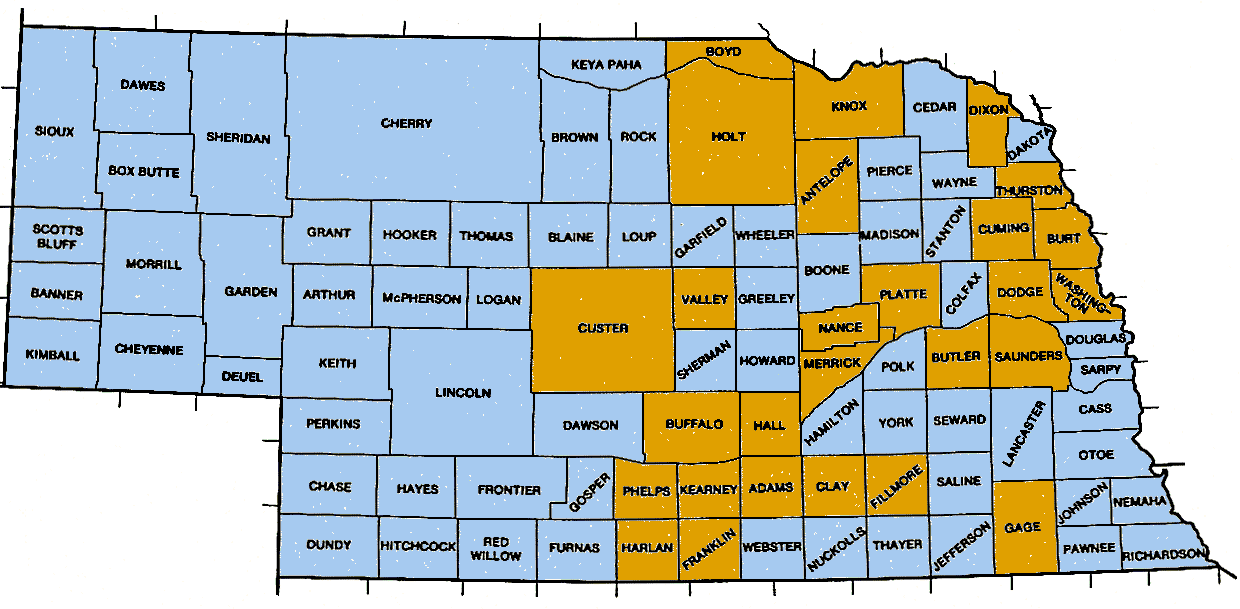
Counties in orange are township counties; counties in blue are commissioner counties

County government in Nebraska is organized in one of two models:

- Township counties: the county is subdivided into organized townships and governed by a 7-member board of supervisors. This is the form used by 27 counties.
- Commissioner counties: the county is governed by a 3-, 5- or 7-member board of commissioners, but is not subdivided into organized townships. This is the form used by 66 counties.

== Elected county officials ==
- Board of Commissioners (commissioner counties) or Board of Supervisors (township counties)
- County assessor
- County attorney
- County clerk
- County sheriff
- County treasurer
- Register of Deeds

Other county officials (such as the county surveyor and the election commissioners) are appointed; in smaller counties, these officials may be shared by multiple counties.
