= Antelope Township, Nebraska =

Antelope Township, Nebraska may refer to one of the following places in Nebraska:

- Antelope Township, Harlan County, Nebraska
- Antelope Township, Holt County, Nebraska
- Antelope Township, Franklin County, Nebraska

== See also ==
- Antelope Township (disambiguation)
