= Emerson Township, Nebraska =

Emerson Township, Nebraska may refer to one of the following places:

- Emerson Township, Dixon County, Nebraska
- Emerson Township, Harlan County, Nebraska

== See also ==
- Emerson Township (disambiguation)
