= Lester Harsh =

American politician (1910–1994)

Member of the Nebraska Legislature from the 38th district
- In office January 5, 1965 – January 5, 1971
- Preceded by: Donald Thompson (redistricting)
- Succeeded by: Richard Lewis

Personal details
- Born: March 13, 1910 Bartley, Nebraska
- Died: June 28, 1994 (aged 84) McCook, Nebraska
- Party: Republican
- Spouse: Elizabeth "Betty" Mills (m. 1932)
- Children: 3
- Education: University of Nebraska
- Occupation: Farmer, school teacher

Lester Harsh (March 13, 1910 – June 28, 1994) was a Republican politician from Nebraska who served as a member of the Nebraska Legislature from the 38th district from 1965 to 1971.

== Early life ==
Harsh was born in Bartley, Nebraska in 1910. He graduated from Bartley High School and attended the University of Nebraska College of Agriculture. Harsh was a farmer and teacher, and served on the Middle Republican Natural Resources District Board of Directors.

== Nebraska Legislature ==
In 1966, State Senator Donald Thompson unsuccessfully ran for Lieutenant Governor, and Harsh was elected to succeed him in the 38th district, which included Furnas, Harlan, and Red Willow counties.

Following redistricting in 1966, the district was expanded to include Frontier and Gosper counties. Harsh ran against fellow State Senator Horace C. Crandall, and defeated him by a 59–41 percent margin in the general election.

In 1970, Harsh ran for re-election to a third term. In the primary election, he placed third, winning 19 percent of the vote, and was defeated.

== Death ==
Harsh died on June 28, 1994.
