= List of FarmHouse chapters =

Following is a list of FarmHouse chapters in order of founding date. Active chapters are in bold. Inactive chapters are in italics.

Chapter	Charter date and range	Institution	Location	Status	Ref.
**Missouri**	April 15, 1905 – 2018; October 23, 2021	University of Missouri	Columbia, Missouri	Active	
**Nebraska**	September 1911	University of Nebraska–Lincoln	Lincoln, Nebraska	Active	
**Illinois**	October 15, 1914	University of Illinois Urbana-Champaign	Ubana, Illinois	Active	
Wisconsin	May 28, 1921 – 2018	University of Wisconsin–Madison	Madison, Wisconsin	Inactive	
**Kansas**	June 2, 1921	Kansas State University	Manhattan, Kansas	Active	
**Iowa State**	January 22, 1927	Iowa State University	Ames, Iowa	Active	(Note: Chapter formed from the Lanthus Club, established in 1923.)
**Oklahoma State**	May 12, 1928	Oklahoma State University–Stillwater	Stillwater, Oklahoma	Active	
**Minnesota**	April 22, 1931	University of Minnesota	Saint Paul, Minnesota	Active	
**Michigan State**	April 25, 1936	Michigan State University	East Lansing, Michigan	Active	
Colorado State	April 19, 1949 - 2026	Colorado State University	Fort Collins, Colorado	Inactive	
Wyoming	October 22, 1950 – 1997	University of Wyoming	Laramie, Wyoming	Inactive	
Kentucky	May 12, 1951 – 2021	University of Kentucky	Lexington, Kentucky	Inactive	
**Purdue**	April 16, 1952	Purdue University	West Lafayette, Indiana	Active	
**N.C. State**	May 15, 1954	North Carolina State University	Raleigh, North Carolina	Active	
**Arkansas**	October 2, 1954 – 1996; April 24, 1999	University of Arkansas	Fayetteville, Arkansas	Active	
**North Dakota State**	April 23, 1955	North Dakota State University	Fargo, North Dakota	Active	
**Washington State**	May 7, 1955	Washington State University	Pullman, Washington	Active	
Idaho	October 12, 1957	University of Idaho	Moscow, Idaho	Active	
**Tennessee**	November 7, 1959	University of Tennessee	Knoxville, Tennessee	Active	
**Mississippi State**	April 11, 1964	Mississippi State University	Starkville, Mississippi	Active	
**Oregon State**	December 20, 1964 – 1997; October 13, 2019	Oregon State University	Corvallis, Oregon	Active	
Georgia	May 8, 1965 – 1974	University of Georgia	Athens, Georgia	Inactive	
**South Dakota State**	May 21, 1966	South Dakota State University	Brookings, South Dakota	Active	
**Auburn**	May 28, 1971	Auburn University	Auburn, Alabama	Active	
**Alberta**	April 20, 1974	University of Alberta	Edmonton, Canada	Active	(Note: Chapter formed from the Agriculture Club, established in 1969.)
**Texas Tech**	April 15, 1978	Texas Tech University	Lubbock, Texas	Active	
Montana State	April 21, 1979 – 1995	Montana State University	Bozeman, Montana	Inactive	
West Virginia	March 28, 1981 – 1987	West Virginia University	Morgantown, West Virginia	Inactive	
Cal Poly	November 20, 1982 – 1996	California State Polytechnic University, Pomona	Pomona, California	Inactive	
Tennessee Tech	April 16, 1983 – 1997	Tennessee Tech University	Cookeville, Tennessee	Inactive	
**Illinois State**	December 17, 1983	Illinois State University	Normal, Illinois	Active	
Nebraska Curtis	February 16, 1985 – 1991	Nebraska College of Technical Agriculture	Curtis, Nebraska	Inactive	
Cal Davis	March 28, 1987 – 1992	University of California, Davis	Davis, California	Inactive	
**New Mexico State**	October 3, 1987 – 200x ?, February 23, 2025	New Mexico State University	Las Cruces, New Mexico	Active	
Morehead	April 9, 1988 – 1995	Morehead State University	Morehead, Kentucky	Inactive	
**Platteville**	April 15, 1989	University of Wisconsin–Platteville	Platteville, Wisconsin	Active	
Cal Poly	May 8, 1993 – 200x ?	California Polytechnic State University, San Luis Obispo	San Luis Obispo, California	Inactive	
**Western Kentucky**	April 23, 1995	Western Kentucky University	Bowling Green, Kentucky	Active	
Clemson	April 29, 1995 – 20xx ?. February 7, 2015 – 2022	Clemson University	Clemson, South Carolina	Inactive	
**Troy**	May 20, 1995	Troy University	Troy, Alabama	Active	
Texas A&M	April 17, 2004 – 2022	Texas A&M University	College Station, Texas	Inactive	
Guelph	April 21, 2007 – 201x ?	University of Guelph	Guelph, Ontario, Canada	Inactive	
**Ohio State**	August 7, 2010	Ohio State University	Columbus, Ohio	Active	(Note: Chapter formed from Alpha Tau Zeta, established in 1898.)
**Virginia Tech**	October 16, 2011	Virginia Tech	Blacksburg, Virginia	Active	
**Tarleton**	March 11, 2012	Tarleton State University	Stephenville, Texas	Active	
**Illinois**	April 4, 2014	Southern Illinois University Carbondale	Carbondale, Illinois	Active	
**Wichita**	April 23, 2017	Wichita State University	Wichita, Kansas	Active	
Nevada	March 3, 2018 – 202x ?	University of Nevada, Reno	Reno, Nevada	Inactive	
**Wilmington**	April 27, 2019	Wilmington College	Wilmington, Ohio	Active	
**Alabama**	April 11, 2026	University of Alabama	Tuscaloosa, Alabama	Active	
**Missouri Associate**		University of Central Missouri	Warrensburg, Missouri	Colony	(Note: Colony established in 2018.)
**Texas Tyler Associate**		University of Texas at Tyler	Tyler, Texas	Colony	(Note: Colony established in 2021.)
