= Horace C. Crandall =

American politician (1896–1981)

Member of the Nebraska Legislature from the 46th district
- In office January 5, 1965 – January 3, 1967
- Preceded by: Seat created
- Succeeded by: Harold D. Simpson

Personal details
- Born: June 4, 1896 North Loup, Nebraska
- Died: March 24, 1981 (aged 84) North Platte, Nebraska
- Party: Republican
- Spouse: Lucille Davis (m. 1920, died)
- Children: 1 (Barbara)
- Education: University of Nebraska; University of Colorado; University of Wisconsin
- Occupation: Teacher

Horace C. Crandall (June 4, 1896 – March 24, 1981) was a Republican politician from Nebraska who served as a member of the Nebraska Legislature from the 46th district from 1965 to 1967.

== Early life ==
Crandall was born in North Loup, Nebraska, in 1896, and graduated from North Loup High School. He attended the University of Nebraska, University of Colorado, and University of Wisconsin, and taught at the Nebraska School of Agriculture in Curtis, serving as the superintendent.

== Nebraska Legislature ==
In 1964, following redistricting, State Senator Dale Erlewine ran for re-election in the newly created 46th district, which included Chase, Dundy, Frontier, Hayes, Hitchcock, and Perkins counties. Crandall ran against Erlewine, and attacked him for his absence from the state legislature, observing, "Had I been a member of the legislature my voting record would have been one of a 'voting senator.'" Crandall was joined in the nonpartisan primary by John Bobinmyer, a former Hitchcock County Commissioner John Bobinmyer. Erlewine placed first in the primary, winning 45 percent of the vote to Crandall's 33 percent and Bobinmyer's 22 percent, and Erlewine and Crandall advanced to the general election. Crandall ultimately defeated Erlewine by a narrow margin, winning 51–49 percent. Though the state legislature was elected in nonpartisan elections, Crandall was a registered Republican.

Crandall ran for re-election in 1966 and, following court-ordered redistricting in 1965, ran in the 38th district, which included Frontier, Furnas, Gosper, Harlan, and Red Willow counties. He ran against fellow State Senator Lester Harsh, who represented much of the newly created district. In the primary election, Harsh placed first, receiving 56 percent of the vote to Crandall's 44 percent. In the general election, Harsh won by a wide margin, defeating Crandall 59–41 percent.

== Death ==
Crandall died on March 24, 1981.
