= Roy L. Pierce =

American sports coach, athletics administrator (1898–1970)

Biographical details
- Born: June 8, 1898; Loomis, Nebraska, U.S.
- Died: August 4, 1970 (aged 72); Curtis, Nebraska, U.S.

Playing career

Football
- c. 1920: Doane

Basketball
- c. 1920: Doane

Track and field
- c. 1920: Doane

Coaching career (HC unless noted)

Football
- 1921–1923: Wilbur HS (NE)
- 1924–1927: Grand Island HS (NE)
- 1928–1932: Doane

Basketball
- 1924–1928: Grand Island HS (NE)
- 1928–1933: Doane

Track and field
- 1921–1924: Wilber HS (NE)
- 1924–1928: Grand Island HS (NE)

Administrative career (AD unless noted)
- 1928–1935: Doane

Head coaching record
- Overall: 18–16–3 (college football)

Accomplishments and honors

Championships
- Basketball; 2 NCAC regular season (1929–1930)

Roy Lee Pierce (June 8, 1898 – August 4, 1970) was an American football, basketball, and track and field coach, athletics administrator, and educator. He served as the head football coach at Doane College in Crete, Nebraska for five seasons, from 1928 to 1932, compiling a record of 18–16–3. Pierce was also the head basketball coach at Doane from 1928 to 1933.

Pierce lettered in football, basketball, and track and field at Doane before graduating in 1921. He began coaching in 1921 at a high school in Wilber, Nebraska. His track teams at Wilber won two state championships. in 1924, Pierce went to Grand Island High School in Grand Island, Nebraska, where he coached football, basketball, and track and field. He returned to Doane in 1928, succeeding Ward Haylett as athletic coach. Pierce was the athletic director at Doane for seven years, from 1928 to 1935. He was later a coach and instructor at the Nebraska College of Technical Agriculture in Curtis, Nebraska. He died on August 4, 1970, at his home in Curtis, after a heart attack.

== Head coaching record ==
=== College football ===
Year	Team	Overall	Conference	Standing	Bowl/playoffs
Doane Tigers (Nebraska College Athletic Conference) (1928–1932)
1928	Doane	4–2–1	3–1–1	T–2nd	
1929	Doane	6–1	5–1	2nd	
1930	Doane	4–3	3–2	T–3rd	
1931	Doane	1–6–1	0–4	6th	
1932	Doane	3–4–1	1–3–1	5th	
Doane:		18–16–3	12–11–2		
Total:		18–16–3			
