= Eliza Suggs =

American author

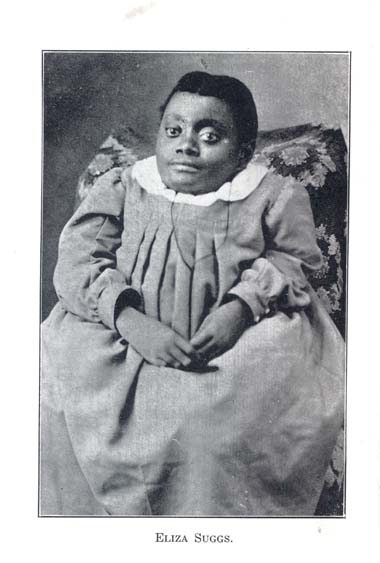
- Eliza Suggs, from the frontispiece of her Shadow and Sunshine (1906).
- Born: December 11, 1876; Bureau County, Illinois, US
- Died: January 29, 1908 (aged 31); Orleans, Nebraska, US
- Occupations: Temperance activist, Christian speaker, memoirist

Elizabeth Gertrude Suggs (December 11, 1876 – January 29, 1908) was a 19th-century American author, born to former slaves. Physically impaired with osteogenesis imperfecta, she was able to gain an education and became known as a temperance lecturer. The little that is known about Eliza Suggs can be found in her book, Shadow and Sunshine, published in 1906.

== Childhood ==
Eliza Suggs was born in Bureau County, Illinois, the youngest of four daughters of James and Malinda (Filbrick) Suggs. Both of the parents had been born in slavery, James in North Carolina and Malinda in Alabama; they met while on a Mississippi plantation, where Malinda had four children. James Suggs had fought in the American Civil War, serving in Company I, of the 55th United States Colored Troops, where he was wounded; after he recovered, he reenlisted, this time in Company C of the 59th United States Colored Troops and served until the end of the war. He worked as a blacksmith, farmer and laborer, but after 1873, he was a preacher in the Free Methodist Church. The family lived in Mississippi, Illinois, and Kansas before settling in Harlan County, Nebraska.

Her parents had three daughters before her, all born in Illinois. At birth, she appeared to be a totally normal baby, but soon her parents began to realize that something wasn't quite right. At four weeks old, Eliza Suggs began crying incessantly. It took her mother a day to realize that her infant daughter had broken a limb. After that bone had healed, Eliza's arm broke. Her bones broke with the gentlest of moves, and they did not expect their fourth child to live very long. However, she went on to live into her thirty-second year.

For the next six years, Eliza could barely move, much less even sit up on her own. Where the average child's day consisted of playing and having fun with friends and siblings, hers consisted of sitting in her carriage before the window, only able to watch the others. When Eliza was around five or six years old, her parents had her burial clothes made. As soon as the garments were finished, they expected to need to use them in short order, half wishing that their daughter's suffering would end. Much to their surprise, their daughter hung on into early adulthood.

In the beginning, the doctors could not find out what was wrong with her. However, as she grew older, and medical techniques slowly improved, she was diagnosed with Rickets, or what is also known as Osteomalacia- severe softening of the bone secondary to severe Vitamin D deficiency. However it is now realised that she had Osteogenesis Imperfecta also known as Brittle Bone Disease.

== Education ==
In her early years, Suggs didn't get around or out much, but when her family moved to a new area, they were lucky to know the teacher of one of the local schools. However, her classroom was upstairs, and therefore virtually impossible for her to access on her own. After close family friends donated a chair more suitable than Eliza's baby carriage, that was her main mode of transportation and it was decided that she would be able to attend school. Either her mother or her sister Kate would wheel her to school with the rest of the girls, and would carry her up the stairs to the classroom. She would be deposited there for the day, and at the end of the day, her mother or sister would come and get her again, carrying her down the stairs, and wheeling her back home. This allowed Suggs to learn everything her sisters and friends were learning, and resulted in her becoming an educated woman, which was unique for a woman of black heritage, even after the Civil War had ended.

== Efforts ==
She was a Free Methodist active in the temperance movement. Before her father's death in 1889, Eliza assisted him in Temperance work; after his death, she struck out on her own. Accompanied by her sister Kate, Eliza would attend various gatherings, including Temperance conferences, camp meetings and church services, and briefly speak about her life, her sufferings, and her devotion to the teachings of Jesus Christ and how they sustained her.

== Death ==
Eliza Suggs died on January 29, 1908, in Orleans, Nebraska.

== Works ==
- Eliza Suggs. "Shadow and Sunshine". The University of North Carolina Library.
