= Jocelyn Viterna =

American academic

- Education: Kansas State University; Indiana University-Bloomington
- Occupation: Sociologist
- Employer: Harvard University

Jocelyn Viterna is an American academic. She is a professor of sociology at Harvard University, and the author of a book about the role of women in the Salvadoran Civil War.

== Early life ==
Jocelyn Viterna grew up in Curtis, Nebraska and Manhattan, Kansas. She earned a bachelor's degree from Kansas State University in 1995 and a PhD from Indiana University Bloomington in Sociology and Latin American Studies in 2003.

== Career ==
Viterna began her academic career at Tulane University, where she was appointed Assistant Professor of Sociology and Latin American and Caribbean Studies in 2003. In 2006 she joined Harvard University as a post-doctoral fellow with the Harvard Academy for International and Area Studies.

She subsequently held the positions of Assistant Professor of Sociology and Social Studies (2007–2011), Associate Professor of Sociology (2011–2016), and Professor of Sociology (2016–present).

At Harvard, Viterna has held several additional appointments. She has been a Faculty Associate at both the David Rockefeller Center for Latin American Studies and the Weatherhead Center for International Affairs. In 2023 she was named Chair of the Committee on Degrees in Studies of Women, Gender, and Sexuality.

Her first book, Women in War: The Micro-level Processes of Mobilization in El Salvador, is about the role that women played in the Salvadoran Civil War of 1979–1992. It is based on interviews with woman who joined the Farabundo Martí National Liberation Front. Viterna shows that women were initially recruited from the Catholic Church and the peasantry, but later joined the FMNLF to avoid rape. She also shows that women who "became organizers in the refugee camps" or "guerrilla leaders" fared better. In a review for the European Review of Latin American and Caribbean Studies, Ralph Sprenkels of Utrecht University suggests Viterna should have delved into the tension between "the well-positioned urban minority and the peasant majority inside the FMNLF and its implications for gender roles." However, Sprenkels concludes that the book is "a remarkable feat" and "essential reading for anyone interested in El Salvador's civil war, as well as for students of gender, political and social movements." Reviewing it for Social Forces, David Smilde highlights confusing statements about the occurrence of rape in refugee camps. He also notes that Viterna could have spent more time analyzing the status of "non-combatants."

== Works ==
- Viterna, Jocelyn (2013). Women in War: The Micro-level Processes of Mobilization in El Salvador. New York: Oxford University Press. ISBN 9780199369591. OCLC 984783913.
