= Harold D. Simpson =

American politician (1926–2001)

Member of the Nebraska Public Service Commission from the 1st district
- In office January 6, 1977 – January 5, 1989
- Preceded by: Robert T. Marland
- Succeeded by: Frank E. Landis Jr.

Member of the Nebraska Legislature from the 46th district
- In office January 3, 1967 – December 31, 1976
- Preceded by: Horace C. Crandall
- Succeeded by: JoAnn Maxey

Personal details
- Born: June 1, 1926 Harlan, Iowa
- Died: May 27, 2001 (aged 74) Lincoln, Nebraska
- Party: Republican
- Spouse: Jean

Harold D. Simpson Sr. (June 1, 1926 – May 27, 2001) was a Republican politician from Nebraska who served as a member of the Nebraska Public Service Commission from 1977 to 1989, and in the Nebraska Legislature from 1967 to 1976.

== Early career ==
Simpson was born in Harlan, Iowa, and attended the Irwin Consolidated School. He served in the U.S. Air Force during World War II. He later worked for the Gooch Milling and Elevator Company.

== Nebraska Legislature ==
In 1966, following redistricting, a new seat in the Nebraska Legislature was created in northern Lincoln. Simpson ran in the newly created 46th district, in the nonpartisan primary, he faced Joseph Franson, a farmer and National Farmers Organization official; Lawrence Sintek, who owned a septic service company; and Charles Wilcox, who managed a real estate and auction company. Simpson placed second in the primary, winning 30 percent of the vote to Wilcox's 34 percent, and both advanced to the general election. Though the race was formally nonpartisan, both Simpson and Wilcox were Republicans, and Franson, a Democrat, announced that he would run in the general election as a write-in candidate. Simpson won by a narrow margin, receiving 51 percent of the vote to Wilcox's 45 percent and Franson's 4 percent.

Simpson ran for re-election in 1970, and faced Franson and Wilcox in a rematch. Simpson narrowly placed second in the primary, receiving 36 percent of the vote to Wilcox's 38 percent and Franson's 26 percent. In the general election, Simpson defeated Wilcox by a wide margin, winning 59–41 percent.

In 1974, Simpson ran for re-election to a third term, and was re-elected unopposed.

Simpson resigned, effective December 31, 1976, upon his election to the Public Service Commission.

== Nebraska Public Service Commission ==
In 1976, Simpson announced that he would run for the Nebraska Public Service Commission from the 1st district, which was represented by Commissioner Robert T. Marland. In the Republican primary, he faced Ruth Swanson, a music teacher and the wife of Wayne Swanson, the former State Treasurer, and Richard Halvorsen, a prison guard. Simpson narrowly won the Republican primary, receiving 41 percent of the vote to Swanson's 37 percent and Halvorsen's 22 percent. In the general election, Simpson faced Joyce Durand, the Democratic nominee and the commission's research and budget director. Simpson ultimately defeated Durand, winning 54 percent of the vote to her 46 percent.

Simpson ran for re-election in 1982, and was challenged in the Republican primary by Daniel Meyer, a research analyst for State Senator John DeCamp, and Donald Larson, a former Otoe County Commissioner. Simpson won only a plurality of the vote, receiving 40 percent to Larson's 31 percent and Meyer's 29 percent. In the general election, he faced Democratic nominee Ralph Johnson, an agricultural economist. He won re-election only narrowly, defeating Johnson 53–47 percent.

In 1988, Simpson ran for a third term, and was challenged in the Republican primary by attorney Frank E. Landis Jr., the brother of Democratic State Senator David Landis. Landis defeated Simpson by a wide margin, receiving 60 percent of the vote to Simpson's 40 percent.

== Personal life and death ==
He was married to Jean. Simpson died on May 27, 2001.
