= Alma, Nebraska =

- City
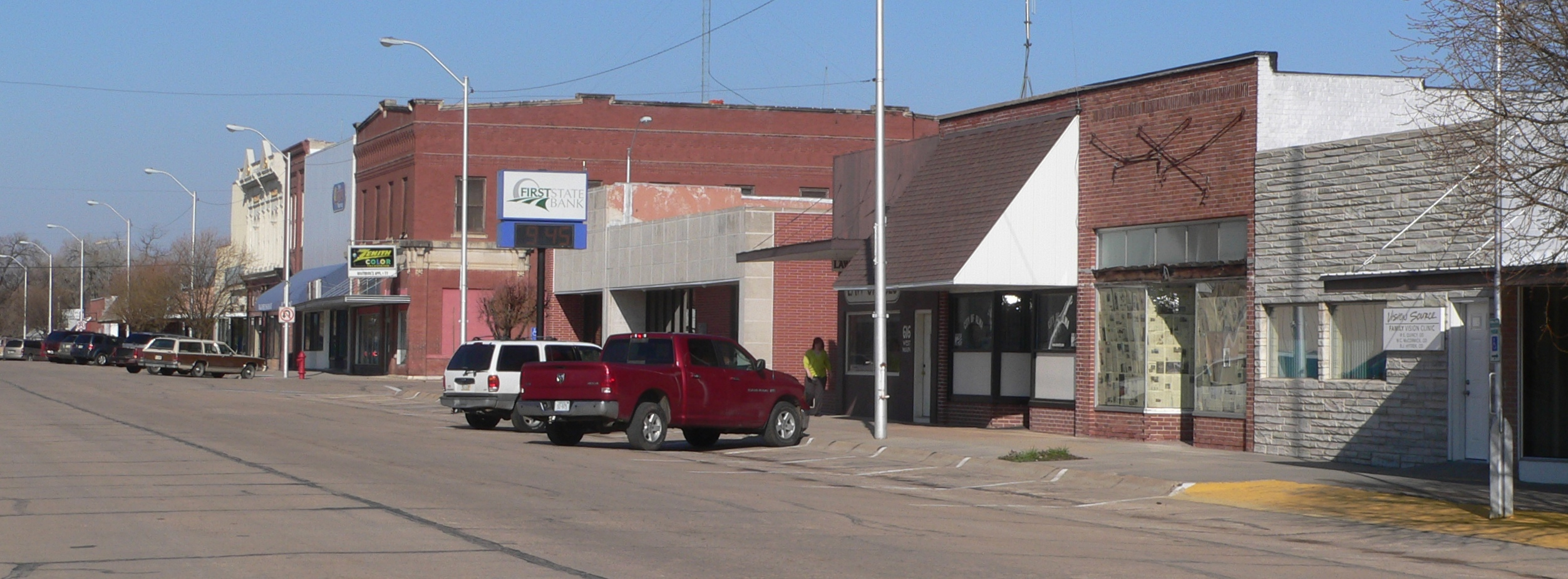
- Main Street

- Location of Alma within Harlan County and Nebraska
- Coordinates: 40°06′13″N 99°21′57″W
- Country: United States
- State: Nebraska
- County: Harlan

Government
  - Mayor: Hal Haeker

Area
  - Total: 1.15 sq mi (2.98 km^{2})
  - Land: 1.15 sq mi (2.98 km^{2})
  - Water: 0 sq mi (0.00 km^{2})
- Elevation: 2,005 ft (611 m)

Population (2020)
  - Total: 1,043
  - Density: 906.9/sq mi (350.15/km^{2})
- Time zone: UTC-6 (Central (CST))
  - Summer (DST): UTC-5 (CDT)
- ZIP code: 68920
- Area code: 308
- FIPS code: 31-00975
- GNIS feature ID: 837849
- Website: almacity.com

Alma is a city in Harlan County, Nebraska, United States. As of the 2020 census, Alma had a population of 1,043. It is the county seat of Harlan County.

== History ==
Alma was founded in the spring of 1871 by a group of Union Pacific railroad laborers originally from Cheyenne, Wyoming. Harlan County was created by the Nebraska Legislature on June 3, 1871, and Alma was made the county seat on July 3, 1871. A dispute among the original settlers led to a dissolution of the town, but it was re-organized in 1874.

Alma's status as county seat was challenged by residents of Orleans, but an 1884 Nebraska Supreme Court decision affirmed Alma's status as seat of Harlan County. Alma officially incorporated in July 1881. The town was named after a daughter of one of the early settlers.

On January 13, 1880, the Chicago, Burlington and Quincy Railroad reached Alma, providing a significant boost for local commerce and industry. In 1887, the Kansas City and Omaha Railroad also reached Alma. Telephone service reached Alma in June 1899. Electricity arrived with a steam power plant in 1906 and water service followed in 1907.

In 1935, major flooding of the nearby Republican River provided an impetus to build a dam on the river. The Army Corps of Engineers started construction of the Harlan County Dam on August 1, 1946, and completed work in November 1952. The lake thus created, Harlan County Reservoir, became one of Alma's top recreation destinations.

During World War II, Alma hosted a small number of captured German prisoners of war who were interned at Camp Atlanta in neighboring Phelps County and who were employed for farm work and other tasks in Harlan County.

== Geography ==
According to the United States Census Bureau, the city has a total area of 0.85 square miles (2.20 km^{2}), all land.

Alma is located at the junction of U.S. routes 136 and 183, at the northwest end of the Harlan County Reservoir.

=== Climate ===
Climate data for Alma, Nebraska (coordinates:40.0983°N 99.3626°W, 1991-2020 precipitation normals)
Month	Jan	Feb	Mar	Apr	May	Jun	Jul	Aug	Sep	Oct	Nov	Dec	Year
Average precipitation inches (mm)	0.50 (13)	0.68 (17)	1.36 (35)	2.56 (65)	3.98 (101)	3.78 (96)	3.82 (97)	3.29 (84)	1.91 (49)	2.12 (54)	0.90 (23)	0.73 (19)	25.63 (653)
Source: NOAA

== Demographics ==
Historical population
Census	Pop.	Note	%±
1880	298		—
1890	905		203.7%
1900	923		2.0%
1910	1,066		15.5%
1920	1,058		−0.8%
1930	1,235		16.7%
1940	1,272		3.0%
1950	1,768		39.0%
1960	1,342		−24.1%
1970	1,299		−3.2%
1980	1,369		5.4%
1990	1,226		−10.4%
2000	1,214		−1.0%
2010	1,133		−6.7%
2020	1,043		−7.9%
U.S. Decennial Census

=== 2010 census ===
As of the census of 2010, there were 1,133 people, 502 households, and 303 families living in the city. The population density was 1,332.9 inhabitants per square mile (514.6/km^{2}). There were 597 housing units at an average density of 702.4 per square mile (271.2/km^{2}). The racial makeup of the city was 99.1% White, 0.1% Native American, 0.4% from other races, and 0.4% from two or more races. Hispanic or Latino of any race were 0.6% of the population.

There were 502 households, of which 25.1% had children under the age of 18 living with them, 51.0% were married couples living together, 6.2% had a female householder with no husband present, 3.2% had a male householder with no wife present, and 39.6% were non-families. 36.5% of all households were made up of individuals, and 20.7% had someone living alone who was 65 years of age or older. The average household size was 2.17 and the average family size was 2.83.

The median age in the city was 49.6 years. 22.5% of residents were under the age of 18; 4.1% were between the ages of 18 and 24; 17.9% were from 25 to 44; 27.3% were from 45 to 64; and 28.2% were 65 years of age or older. The gender makeup of the city was 48.3% male and 51.7% female.

=== 2000 census ===
As of the census of 2000, there were 1,214 people, 520 households, and 318 families living in the city. The population density was 1,744.7 inhabitants per square mile (673.6/km^{2}). There were 594 housing units at an average density of 853.7 per square mile (329.6/km^{2}). The racial makeup of the city was 99.18% White, 0.08% Native American, 0.08% Asian, 0.08% from other races, and 0.58% from two or more races. Hispanic or Latino of any race were 0.58% of the population.

There were 520 households, out of which 25.6% had children under the age of 18 living with them, 54.0% were married couples living together, 5.0% had a female householder with no husband present, and 38.8% were non-families. 36.3% of all households were made up of individuals, and 22.7% had someone living alone who was 65 years of age or older. The average household size was 2.23 and the average family size was 2.93.

In the city, the population was spread out, with 24.3% under the age of 18, 3.4% from 18 to 24, 19.8% from 25 to 44, 23.9% from 45 to 64, and 28.7% who were 65 years of age or older. The median age was 46 years. For every 100 females, there were 83.9 males. For every 100 females age 18 and over, there were 82.3 males.

As of 2000 the median income for a household in the city was $27,315, and the median income for a family was $36,250. Males had a median income of $26,786 versus $17,065 for females. The per capita income for the city was $14,795. About 9.5% of families and 13.1% of the population were below the poverty line, including 17.5% of those under age 18 and 10.0% of those age 65 or over.

== Transportation ==
=== Major highways ===
- U.S. Highway 136
- U.S. Highway 183
