= Spring Grove Township =

Spring Grove Township may refer to these places in the United States:

- Spring Grove Township, Greene County, Arkansas
- Spring Grove Township, Warren County, Illinois
- Spring Grove Township, Linn County, Iowa
- Spring Grove Township, Houston County, Minnesota
- Spring Grove Township, Harlan County, Nebraska
- Spring Grove Township, McHenry County, North Dakota
- Spring Grove Township, Roberts County, South Dakota
