= Scandinavia Township, Harlan County, Nebraska =

Scandinavia Township
- Township
- Location in Harlan County
- Coordinates: 40°18′31″N 099°20′51″W
- Country: United States
- State: Nebraska
- County: Harlan

Area
  - Total: 35.88 sq mi (92.93 km^{2})
  - Land: 35.88 sq mi (92.93 km^{2})
  - Water: 0 sq mi (0 km^{2}) 0%
- Elevation: 2,221 ft (677 m)

Population (2000)
  - Total: 126
  - Density: 3.6/sq mi (1.4/km^{2})
- GNIS feature ID: 0838233

Scandinavia Township is one of sixteen townships in Harlan County, Nebraska, United States. The population was 126 at the 2000 census. A 2006 estimate placed the township's population at 116.

A small portion of the Village of Ragan lies within the Township.

== See also ==
- County government in Nebraska
