= Senator Crandall =

Senator Crandall may refer to:

- Horace C. Crandall (1896–1981), Nebraska State Senate
- Rich Crandall (born 1967), Arizona State Senate

== See also ==
- Chester Crandell (1946–2014), Arizona State Senate
