= Erlewine =

Erlewine is a surname. Notable people with the surname include:

- Dale Erlewine (1900–1991), American politician from Nebraska
- Dan Erlewine (born c. 1945), American luthier
- May Erlewine (born 1983), American musician
- Michael Erlewine (born 1941), American musician, TV host, Internet entrepreneur, and founder of All Music Guide
- Stephen Thomas Erlewine (born 1973), American music critic and senior editor for AllMusic
