= Alma Township =

Alma Township may refer to one of the following places in the US:

- Alma Township, Marion County, Illinois
- Alma Township, Marshall County, Minnesota
- Alma Township, Harlan County, Nebraska
