= Antelope Township =

Antelope Township may refer to one of the following places in the United States:

- Antelope Township, Franklin County, Nebraska
- Antelope Township, Harlan County, Nebraska
- Antelope Township, Holt County, Nebraska
- Antelope Township, Perkins County, South Dakota

== See also ==
- West Antelope Township, Benson County, North Dakota
