= Turkey Creek Township, Harlan County, Nebraska =

Turkey Creek Township
- Township
- Location in Harlan County
- Coordinates: 40°13′04″N 099°13′54″W
- Country: United States
- State: Nebraska
- County: Harlan

Area
  - Total: 35.99 sq mi (93.22 km^{2})
  - Land: 35.97 sq mi (93.16 km^{2})
  - Water: 0.019 sq mi (0.05 km^{2}) 0.05%
- Elevation: 2,162 ft (659 m)

Population (2000)
  - Total: 82
  - Density: 2.3/sq mi (0.9/km^{2})
- GNIS feature ID: 0838294

Turkey Creek Township is one of sixteen townships in Harlan County, Nebraska, United States. The population was 82 at the 2000 census. A 2006 estimate placed the township's population at 76.

A portion of the Village of Huntley lies within the Township.

== See also ==
- County government in Nebraska
