= Washington Township, Harlan County, Nebraska =

Washington Township
- Township
- Location in Harlan County
- Coordinates: 40°13′16″N 099°20′24″W
- Country: United States
- State: Nebraska
- County: Harlan

Area
  - Total: 36.00 sq mi (93.23 km^{2})
  - Land: 36.00 sq mi (93.23 km^{2})
  - Water: 0 sq mi (0 km^{2}) 0%
- Elevation: 2,221 ft (677 m)

Population (2000)
  - Total: 66
  - Density: 1.8/sq mi (0.7/km^{2})
- GNIS feature ID: 0838318

Washington Township is one of sixteen townships in Harlan County, Nebraska, United States. The population was 66, according to the 2000 census. As of 2006 estimate, the township's population was 61.

A portion of the Village of Huntley lies within the Township.

== See also ==
- County government in Nebraska
