= Mullally Township, Harlan County, Nebraska =

Mullally Township
- Township
- Location in Harlan County
- Coordinates: 40°08′04″N 099°13′56″W
- Country: United States
- State: Nebraska
- County: Harlan

Area
  - Total: 36.03 sq mi (93.32 km^{2})
  - Land: 36.03 sq mi (93.32 km^{2})
  - Water: 0 sq mi (0 km^{2}) 0%
- Elevation: 2,123 ft (647 m)

Population (2000)
  - Total: 300
  - Density: 8.3/sq mi (3.2/km^{2})
- GNIS feature ID: 0838148

Mullally Township is one of sixteen townships in Harlan County, Nebraska, United States. The population was 300 at the 2000 census. A 2006 estimate placed the township's population at 270.

The Village of Republican City lies within the Township.

== See also ==
- County government in Nebraska
