= Robert E. Rundle =

American chemist and crystallographer

- Born: Robert Eugene Rundle; 1915; Orleans, Nebraska, U.S.
- Died: October 9, 1963 (aged 47–48); U.S
- Education: University of Nebraska; California Institute of Technology
- Scientific career
- Fields: Chemistry

Robert Eugene Rundle (1915 – 9 October 1963) was an American chemist and crystallographer. He was a professor at Iowa State University and fellow of the American Physical Society.

== Early life and education ==
Rundle was born in Orleans, Nebraska in 1915. He attended University of Nebraska where he completed a bachelor of science in 1937 and a master's degree in 1938. He completed a Ph.D. in 1941 at the California Institute of Technology. His advisors were Linus Pauling and J. Holmes Sturdivant.

== Career and research ==
Rundle joined Iowa State University as an assistant professor of chemistry. From 1945 to 1946, he worked at Princeton University before returning to Iowa State University as a full professor. His research was focused on x-ray diffraction by crystals, inorganic solid-state chemistry, intermetallic and interstitial compounds, hydrogen-bonded substances, compounds of uranium and thorium, and electron-deficient compounds. He was a member of the American Crystallographic Association and served as the president of the organization in 1958. He was a member of the American Association of University Professors.

== Awards and honors ==
Rundle was a fellow of the American Physical Society.

== Personal life ==
Rundle died from a stroke in Iowa Methodist Hospital on October 9, 1963. He was survived by his wife and three sons.
