= Albany Township, Harlan County, Nebraska =

Albany Township
- Township
- Location in Harlan County
- Coordinates: 40°18′36″N 099°28′02″W
- Country: United States
- State: Nebraska
- County: Harlan

Area
  - Total: 35.63 sq mi (92.29 km^{2})
  - Land: 35.63 sq mi (92.29 km^{2})
  - Water: 0 sq mi (0 km^{2}) 0%
- Elevation: 2,280 ft (695 m)

Population (2000)
  - Total: 52
  - Density: 1.6/sq mi (0.6/km^{2})
- GNIS feature ID: 0837845

Albany Township is one of sixteen townships in Harlan County, Nebraska, United States. The population was 52 at the 2000 census. A 2006 estimate placed the township's population at 48.

== See also ==
- County government in Nebraska
