= JoAnn Maxey =

American politician (1938–1992)

Jo Ann Maxey

Member of the Nebraska Legislature from the 46th district
- In office January 1, 1977 – January 3, 1979
- Preceded by: Harold D. Simpson
- Succeeded by: David Landis

Personal details
- Born: March 6, 1938 Chattanooga, Tennessee
- Died: July 14, 1992 (aged 54) Lincoln, Nebraska
- Party: Democratic
- Spouse(s): Albert Maxey, Sr.
- Children: 4 (Charlene, Michelle, Albert Jr., Aaron)
- Education: Butler University; Indiana University; University of Nebraska–Lincoln

JoAnn Maxey (March 6, 1938 – July 14, 1992) was a Democratic politician from Nebraska who served as a member of the Nebraska Legislature from the 46th district from 1977 to 1979. She was the first Black woman to serve in the Nebraska Legislature.

== Early career ==
Maxey was born in Chattanooga, Tennessee, and attended Butler University and Indiana University before moving to Nebraska.

In 1975, Maxey ran for the Lincoln Public Schools Board of Education. Maxey placed second in the primary election, and advanced to the general election, where she was ultimately elected, becoming the first Black member of the Board of Education. While a member of the Board of Education, she "pioneered programs in special education, outreach for dropouts and at-risk students, broader vocational activities and expansion of girls' sports opportunities."

== Nebraska Legislature ==
In 1976, State Senator Harold D. Simpson was elected to the Nebraska Public Service Commission, and Governor J. James Exon appointed Maxey as his replacement. While a member of the legislature, Maxey sponsored the Nebraska Equal Opportunity for Displaced Homemakers Act, which established centers for supporting divorced or widowed women with job counseling or retraining. After Exon vetoed the bill, Maxey successfully moved to override Exon's veto.

Maxey ran for re-election in 1978, and was challenged by David Landis, a fellow Democrat and an administrative law judge for the state Department of Labor. In the primary election, Landis placed first over Maxey, winning 55 percent of the vote to her 45 percent, and they both advanced to the general election. Landis ultimately defeated Maxey by a wide margin, 58–42 percent.

== Post-legislative career ==
In 1979, Maxey announced that she would run for the Lincoln Board of Education again, and was ultimately elected unopposed. She ran for re-election in 1983, She was challenged by Marceil Dreier, and placed first in the primary election, but was narrowly defeated in the general election, winning 48 percent of the vote to Dreyer's 52 percent.

== Death and legacy ==
Maxey died of cancer on July 14, 1992. In 1995, Maxey Elementary School opened in Lincoln, and was named for her.

Following Maxey's two-year tenure, she was the last Black woman to serve in the Legislature until the election of Brenda Council and Tanya Cook in 2008.
