= Orleans Township, Harlan County, Nebraska =

Orleans Township
- Township
- Location in Harlan County
- Coordinates: 40°07′57″N 099°27′37″W
- Country: United States
- State: Nebraska
- County: Harlan

Area
  - Total: 35.59 sq mi (92.19 km^{2})
  - Land: 35.30 sq mi (91.43 km^{2})
  - Water: 0.29 sq mi (0.76 km^{2}) 0.82%
- Elevation: 2,024 ft (617 m)

Population (2000)
  - Total: 523
  - Density: 15/sq mi (5.7/km^{2})
- ZIP code: 68966
- Area code: 308
- GNIS feature ID: 0838179

Orleans Township is one of sixteen townships in Harlan County, Nebraska, United States. The population was 523 at the 2000 census. A 2006 estimate placed the township's population at 468.

The Village of Orleans lies within the Township.

== See also ==
- County government in Nebraska
