= Reuben Township, Harlan County, Nebraska =

Reuben Township
- Township
- Location in Harlan County
- Coordinates: 40°13′11″N 099°27′24″W
- Country: United States
- State: Nebraska
- County: Harlan

Area
  - Total: 35.54 sq mi (92.04 km^{2})
  - Land: 35.52 sq mi (91.99 km^{2})
  - Water: 0.019 sq mi (0.05 km^{2}) 0.05%
- Elevation: 2,192 ft (668 m)

Population (2000)
  - Total: 61
  - Density: 1.8/sq mi (0.7/km^{2})
- ZIP code: 68966
- Area code: 308
- GNIS feature ID: 0838209

Reuben Township is one of sixteen townships in Harlan County, Nebraska, United States. The population was 61 at the 2000 census. A 2006 estimate placed the township's population at 56.

== See also ==
- County government in Nebraska
