= Danielle Conrad =

American politician (born 1977)

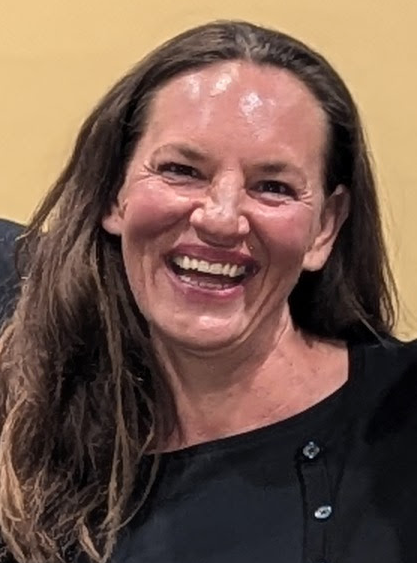

Member of the Nebraska Legislature from the 46th district
- Incumbent
- Assumed office January 4, 2023
- Preceded by: Adam Morfeld
- In office 2007–2015
- Preceded by: David Landis
- Succeeded by: Adam Morfeld

Personal details
- Born: Danielle Nantkes; August 5, 1977 (age 49) Seward, Nebraska, U.S.
- Party: Democratic
- Education: University of Nebraska–Lincoln (BA); University of Nebraska College of Law (JD)

Danielle Conrad (née Nantkes; born August 5, 1977) is a politician from the U.S. state of Nebraska. From 2007 to 2015, she served in the Nebraska State Legislature, representing District 46 on the city of Lincoln's north side. She was elected again to the Nebraska Legislature in 2022.

== Early life and education ==
She was born on August 5, 1977, in Seward, Nebraska. Her father served as a Deputy Sheriff for over 25 years; her mother served as a teacher at Lincoln Public Schools for over 15 years. Conrad graduated from the University of Nebraska–Lincoln with a B.A. in 2000. She went on to earn her Juris Doctor at the University of Nebraska College of Law in 2003.

According to a background article prepared by the Unicameral Update, Conrad became a fan of politics as a teenager, following the historic race for Governor pitting two women, Republican Kay Orr against Democrat Helen Boosalis.

She married in 2008.

== Affiliations ==
Conrad's affiliations in the community include the Lincoln YWCA Board of Directors; Community Development Taskforce, Nebraska Bar Association, Lincoln Bar Association, and the Volunteer Lawyers Project.

After becoming a member of the Nebraska State Bar Association, she took a job with the Nebraska Appleseed Center for Law in the Public Interest, a non-profit, non-partisan law project providing legal counsel to the poor, minorities, and immigrants in the state of Nebraska.

Conrad headed the ACLU of Nebraska from 2014 to 2022. During this time, the staff grew from just four people to a team of ten full-time staff with two contact lawyers. They won legal victories concerning LGBTQ+ equality, open government, and reproductive rights. She also supported expanding Medicaid eligibility, banning predatory payday lending, eliminating the last vestiges of slavery from Nebraska's state constitution, increasing the minimum wage, and increasing election participation through a mass mailing of vote-by-mail applications.

== Nebraska Legislature ==
A registered Democrat, Conrad (Nantkes at the time) first ran for elected office in 2006, seeking to represent the 46th Legislative District. She defeated Republican Carol Brown with 55% of the vote. Her standing committee assignments included Appropriations and Nebraska Retirement Systems. She also served on the Performance Audit Committee, Redistricting Committee, and chaired the Legislature's Innovation and Entrepreneurial Task Force. During Conrad's time in office, she was one of only ten women in the 49-member Nebraska Legislature.

Due to term limits, she did not seek re-election to the Legislature in 2014, and was succeeded by Adam Morfeld.

During her second term starting in 2023, Conrad has served on the Education, Natural Resources, and Nebraska Retirement Systems Committees.

Conrad has a number of endorsements from organizations such as, The Lincoln Journal Star, Nebraska Cattlemen, Women Who Run Nebraska, The Sierra Club, Planned Parenthood Advocates of Nebraska, National Association of Social Workers, Moms Demand Action, along with many current and former Nebraska State senators.

District 46 of Nebraska's Legislative District includes northeast Lincoln and a small section of Lancaster County.

=== LGBTQA+ ===
Conrad supports the LGBTQA+ community. She voted against defining “male” and “female” in relation to locker rooms and restrooms in educational settings (LB 89) and forcing students to use restrooms associated with biological gender (LB 575). Conrad also introduced Legislative Bill (LB) 485, Prohibit discrimination based upon sexual orientation as prescribed, which did not pass.

=== Abortion Rights ===
Conrad is for abortion healthcare rights, voting against Legislative Bill (LB) 632 and Legislative Bill (LB) 574.

=== Education ===
Conrad introduced Legislative Bill (LB) 31, Require school policies relating to the use of student surveillance, monitoring, and tracking technology by school districts, which would require the State Board of Education to make a plan for school districts to track inventory of surveillance equipment, along with the names of vendors and third parties. As of Summer 2025, the bill is pending.

Conrad supports free menstrual products in school and abolishing debt collectors from seeking repayment from families for a child’s unpaid school lunch debt.

==== Workers Rights ====
Conrad has voted twice to increase Nebraska minimum wages; once in 2007 and again in 2014.

== Electoral history ==
Nebraska's 46th Legislative District Election, 2022
Primary election
Party	Candidate	Votes	%
Democratic	Danielle Conrad	1,594	43.20
Democratic	James Michael Bowers	1,431	38.78
Libertarian	James Herrold	665	18.02
Total votes		3,690	100.00
General election
Democratic	Danielle Conrad	3,146	51.48
Democratic	James Michael Bowers	2,965	48.52
Total votes		6,111	100.00
Democratic hold			
