= Emerson Township =

Emerson Township may refer to one of the following places in the United States:

- Emerson Township, Columbia County, Arkansas, in Columbia County, Arkansas
- Emerson Township, Michigan
- Emerson Township, Dixon County, Nebraska
- Emerson Township, Harlan County, Nebraska
- Emerson Township, Faulk County, South Dakota, in Faulk County, South Dakota
