= Mascot, Nebraska =

Unincorporated community in Nebraska, United States

- Unincorporated community
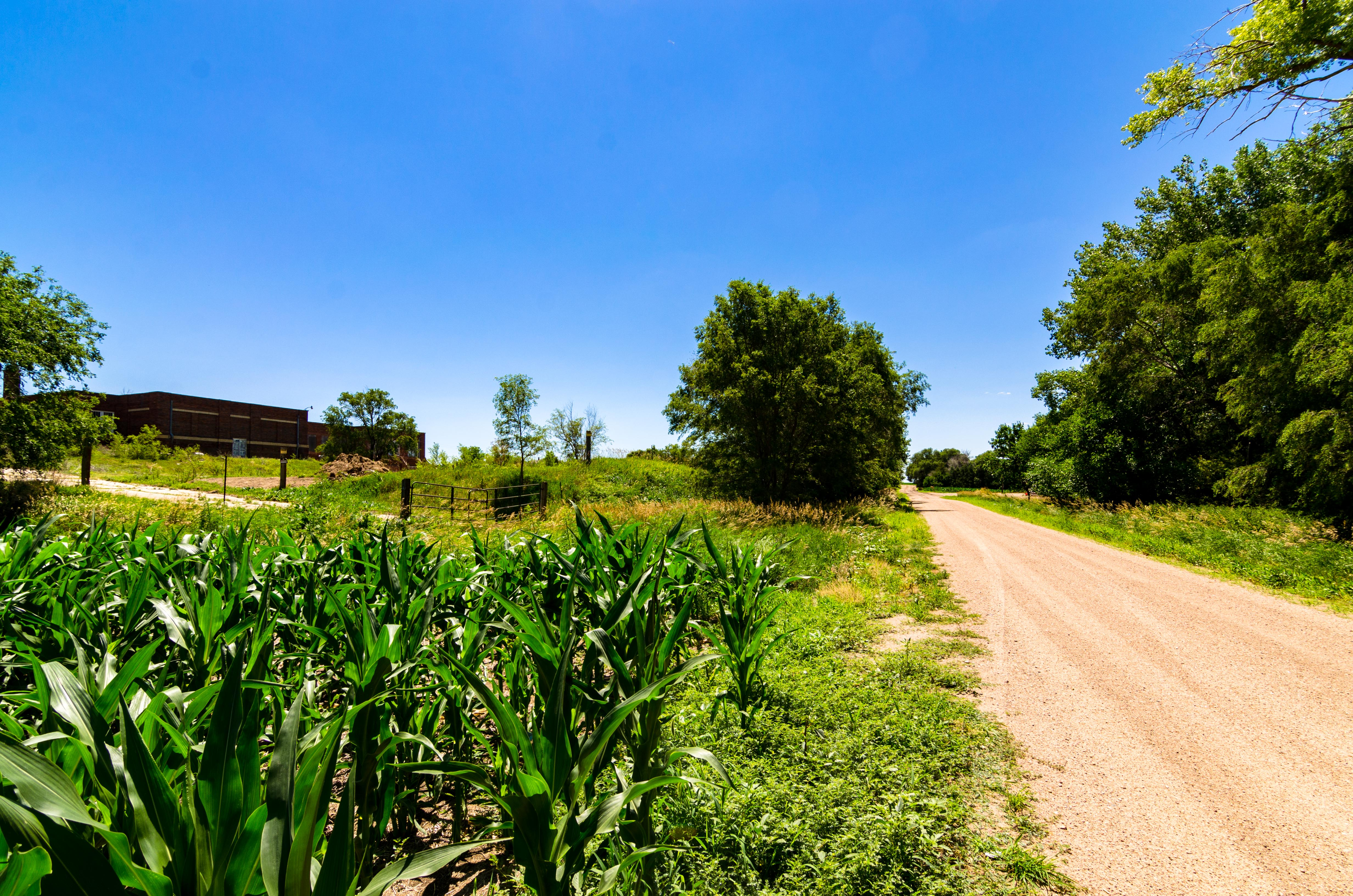
- A Farm Near Mascot

- Location within Nebraska
- Coordinates: 40°15′52″N 99°32′46″W
- Country: United States
- State: Nebraska
- County: Harlan
- Elevation: 2,136 ft (651 m)
- Time zone: UTC-6 (Central (CST))
  - Summer (DST): UTC-5 (CDT)
- ZIP code: 68967
- Area code: 308
- GNIS feature ID: 831079

Mascot is an unincorporated community in Harlan County, Nebraska, United States. Mascot is a rural settlement within Spring Grove Township, the nearby village of Oxford is located a few miles to the west.

== History ==
Mascot was first called Rouse until it was renamed by the railroad. A post office was established in 1886 and discontinued in 1892. High school graduates from 1923 to 1958.
