= Republican City, Nebraska =

- Village
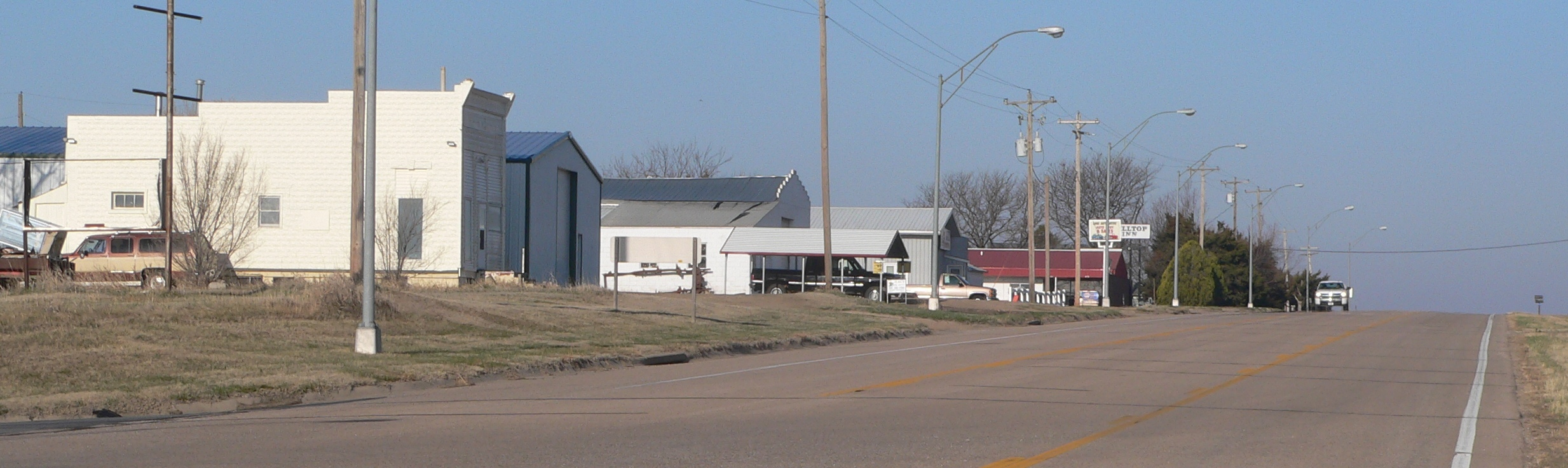
- Republican City, seen from U.S. Route 136

- Location of Republican City, Nebraska

- Location within Nebraska Location within the United States
- Coordinates: 40°05′55″N 99°13′20″W
- Country: United States
- State: Nebraska
- County: Harlan
- Township: Mullally

Area
  - Total: 0.32 sq mi (0.84 km^{2})
  - Land: 0.32 sq mi (0.84 km^{2})
  - Water: 0 sq mi (0.00 km^{2})
- Elevation: 2,024 ft (617 m)

Population (2020)
  - Total: 134
  - Density: 411.7/sq mi (158.97/km^{2})
- Time zone: UTC-6 (Central (CST))
  - Summer (DST): UTC-5 (CDT)
- ZIP code: 68971
- Area code: 308
- FIPS code: 31-41130
- GNIS feature ID: 2399060
- Website: www.repcityne.com

Republican City is a village in Harlan County, Nebraska, United States. As of the 2020 census, Republican City had a population of 134. The town is near the Harlan County Reservoir. At its peak in the 1950s the population was about 4 times larger than it is today.

== History ==
Republican City was founded in 1871. It is named after the Republican River. On May 31, 1935, the Republican River flooded, submerging Republican City's south side. A total of 91 Nebraskans died in the flood waters. In the aftermath, the village relocated away from the river.

== Geography ==
According to the United States Census Bureau, the village has a total area of 0.33 square miles (0.85 km^{2}), all land.

=== Climate ===
Climate data for Republican City, Nebraska (Harlan County Lake) 1991–2020 normals, extremes 1894–present
Month	Jan	Feb	Mar	Apr	May	Jun	Jul	Aug	Sep	Oct	Nov	Dec	Year
Record high °F (°C)	77 (25)	80 (27)	89 (32)	97 (36)	100 (38)	108 (42)	111 (44)	108 (42)	105 (41)	96 (36)	86 (30)	81 (27)	111 (44)
Mean daily maximum °F (°C)	39.0 (3.9)	44.2 (6.8)	55.5 (13.1)	64.6 (18.1)	73.7 (23.2)	84.7 (29.3)	90.0 (32.2)	87.6 (30.9)	80.7 (27.1)	67.8 (19.9)	53.5 (11.9)	41.7 (5.4)	65.2 (18.4)
Daily mean °F (°C)	26.6 (−3.0)	31.0 (−0.6)	41.4 (5.2)	51.0 (10.6)	61.3 (16.3)	72.4 (22.4)	77.7 (25.4)	75.3 (24.1)	67.0 (19.4)	53.5 (11.9)	40.1 (4.5)	30.0 (−1.1)	52.3 (11.3)
Mean daily minimum °F (°C)	14.3 (−9.8)	17.8 (−7.9)	27.3 (−2.6)	37.3 (2.9)	48.9 (9.4)	60.0 (15.6)	65.4 (18.6)	63.0 (17.2)	53.3 (11.8)	39.2 (4.0)	26.6 (−3.0)	18.2 (−7.7)	39.3 (4.1)
Record low °F (°C)	−24 (−31)	−28 (−33)	−18 (−28)	9 (−13)	18 (−8)	34 (1)	40 (4)	42 (6)	21 (−6)	3 (−16)	−10 (−23)	−35 (−37)	−35 (−37)
Average precipitation inches (mm)	0.38 (9.7)	0.50 (13)	1.26 (32)	2.43 (62)	4.06 (103)	3.57 (91)	4.05 (103)	3.19 (81)	1.64 (42)	1.95 (50)	0.83 (21)	0.81 (21)	24.67 (627)
Average snowfall inches (cm)	3.5 (8.9)	4.2 (11)	1.8 (4.6)	0.6 (1.5)	0.0 (0.0)	0.0 (0.0)	0.0 (0.0)	0.0 (0.0)	0.0 (0.0)	1.3 (3.3)	1.6 (4.1)	2.3 (5.8)	15.3 (39)
Average precipitation days (≥ 0.01 in)	3.0	3.2	4.1	8.3	10.4	8.9	8.8	8.7	6.0	5.3	3.1	2.4	72.2
Average snowy days (≥ 0.1 in)	1.9	2.4	0.9	0.3	0.0	0.0	0.0	0.0	0.0	0.2	1.0	1.2	7.9
Source: NOAA

== Demographics ==
Historical population
Census	Pop.	Note	%±
1880	282		—
1890	428		51.8%
1900	386		−9.8%
1910	476		23.3%
1920	424		−10.9%
1930	417		−1.7%
1940	331		−20.6%
1950	580		75.2%
1960	189		−67.4%
1970	179		−5.3%
1980	231		29.1%
1990	199		−13.9%
2000	209		5.0%
2010	150		−28.2%
2020	134		−10.7%
U.S. Decennial Census

=== 2010 census ===
At the 2010 census there were 150 people, 76 households, and 47 families in the village. The population density was 454.5 inhabitants per square mile (175.5/km^{2}). There were 207 housing units at an average density of 627.3 per square mile (242.2/km^{2}). The racial makeup of the village was 100.0% White. Hispanic or Latino of any race were 1.3%.

Of the 76 households 13.2% had children under the age of 18 living with them, 56.6% were married couples living together, 5.3% had a female householder with no husband present, and 38.2% were non-families. 34.2% of households were one person and 15.8% were one person aged 65 or older. The average household size was 1.97 and the average family size was 2.51.

The median age in the village was 59.8 years. 14% of residents were under the age of 18; 3.4% were between the ages of 18 and 24; 11.3% were from 25 to 44; 32.7% were from 45 to 64; and 38.7% were 65 or older. The gender makeup of the village was 52.7% male and 47.3% female.

=== 2000 census ===
At the 2000 census there were 209 people, 107 households, and 69 families in the village. The population density was 633.8 inhabitants per square mile (244.7/km^{2}). There were 218 housing units at an average density of 661.1 per square mile (255.3/km^{2}). The racial makeup of the village was 99.52% White, and 0.48% from two or more races. Hispanic or Latino of any race were 0.96%.

Of the 107 households 15.0% had children under the age of 18 living with them, 57.9% were married couples living together, 4.7% had a female householder with no husband present, and 35.5% were non-families. 33.6% of households were one person and 20.6% were one person aged 65 or older. The average household size was 1.95 and the average family size was 2.43.

The age distribution was 12.9% under the age of 18, 5.7% from 18 to 24, 11.0% from 25 to 44, 34.0% from 45 to 64, and 36.4% 65 or older. The median age was 60 years. For every 100 females, there were 101.0 males. For every 100 females age 18 and over, there were 100.0 males.

The median household income was $26,250, and the median family income was $32,500. Males had a median income of $27,500 versus $17,917 for females. The per capita income for the village was $14,863. About 6.9% of families and 8.5% of the population were below the poverty line, including 10.5% of those under the age of eighteen and 12.2% of those sixty five or over.
