= Dale Erlewine =

American politician (1900–1991)

Member of the Nebraska Legislature from the 37th district
- In office January 6, 1959 – January 5, 1965
- Preceded by: Norval Dame
- Succeeded by: Kenneth Bowen (redistricted)

Personal details
- Born: July 8, 1900 Perkins County, Nebraska
- Died: October 14, 1991 (aged 91) Grant, Nebraska
- Party: Independent
- Spouses: Peggy Ayers (m. 1923; death 1950); Ruth Knutson (m. 1952; death 1981); Mary Berge (m. 1983)
- Children: 3 (Dale, Larry, Keith)
- Occupation: Farmer

Dale Erlewine, Sr. (July 8, 1900 – October 14, 1991) was an independent politician from Nebraska who served as a member of the Nebraska Legislature from the 37th district from 1959 to 1965.

== Early life ==
Erlewine was born on his family farm near Grant in Perkins County, Nebraska, in 1900. He attended country school and finished the eighth grade, and operated a farm near Grant. Erlewine served on the Grant School Board, was one of the founders of the Midwest Electric Cooperative, and was an officer of the Nebraska Farm Bureau Federation.

== Nebraska Legislature ==
In 1958, State Senator Norval Dame ran for re-election to as second term, and Erlewine challenged him in the 37th district, which included Chase, Dundy, Hayes, Hitchcock, and Perkins counties. In the nonpartisan primary, he was joined by physician Fay Smith and businessman Jay Person. Erlewine placed first in the primary, winning 36 percent of the vote to Smith's 32 percent and Dame's 17 percent. Erlewine and Smith advanced to the general election, which Erlewine won with 56 percent of the vote.

Erlewine ran for re-election in 1960, and was re-elected unopposed.

In 1962, Erlewine sought a third term, and was challenged by Person, one of his opponents from his 1958 campaign, and housewife Violet Hoyt. Erlewine placed first in the primary election by a wide margin, winning 63 percent of the vote to Person's 26 percent and Hoyt's 11 percent. He and Person proceeded to the general election. Erlewine won re-election in a landslide, defeating Person, 71–29 percent.

Following redistricting, Erlewine ran for re-election in the newly created 46th district, which included Chase, Dundy, Frontier, Hayes, Hitchcock, and Perkins counties. He was challenged by Horace C. Crandall, the superintendent of the Nebraska School of Agriculture, and former Hitchcock County Commissioner John Bobinmyer. In the primary election, Erlewine placed first, receiving 45 percent of the vote to Crandall's 33 percent. In the general election, Crandall narrowly defeated Erlewine, receiving 51 percent of the vote to his 49 percent.

== Death ==
Erlewine died on October 14, 1991.
