= Harlan County Reservoir =

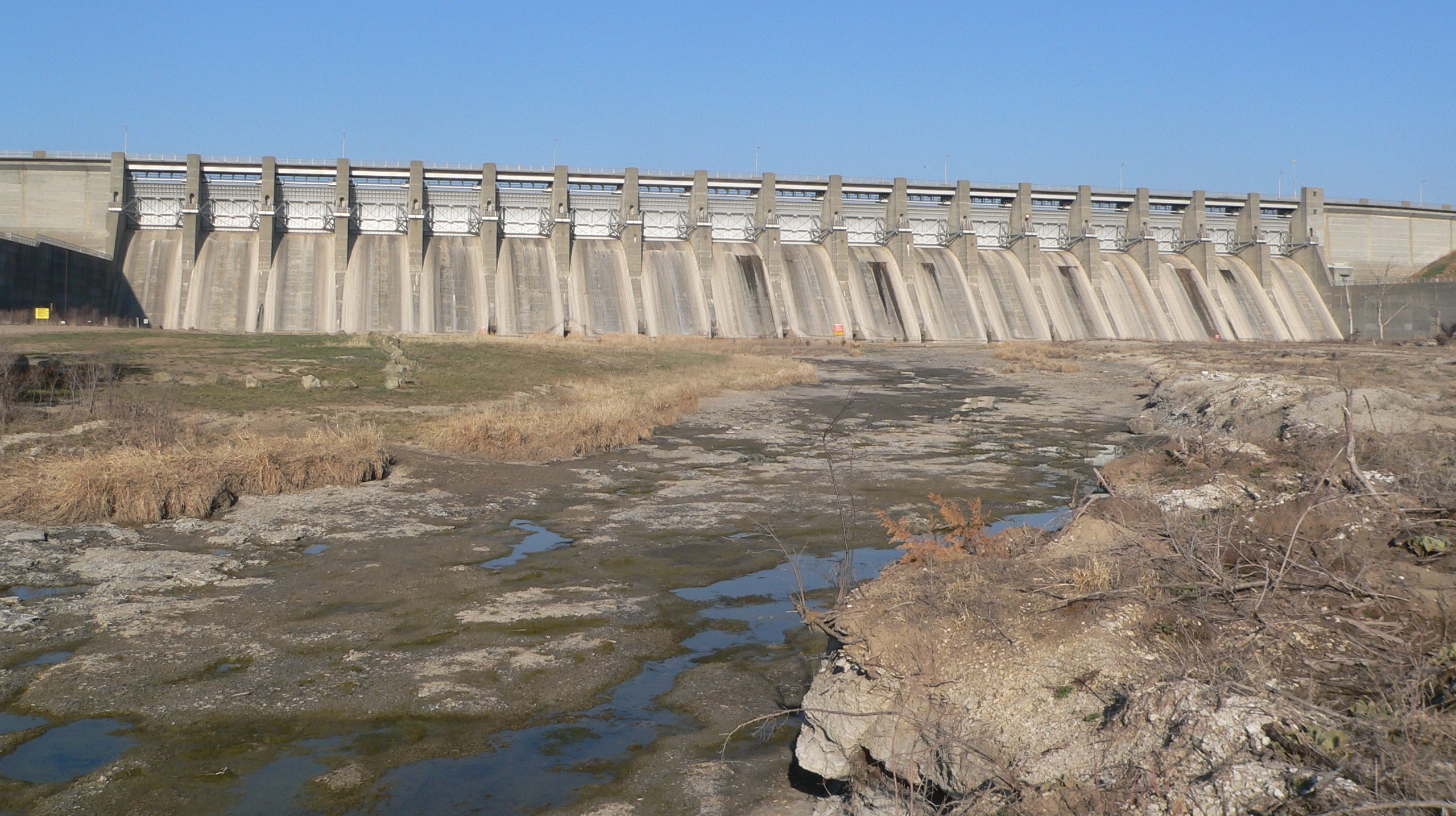
- Outlet structure of Harlan County Dam, seen from downstream

- Location within Nebraska Location within the United States
- Location: Harlan County, Nebraska / Phillips County, Kansas, United States
- Coordinates: 40°04′15″N 099°12′41″W
- Type: reservoir
- Primary inflows: Republican River
- Primary outflows: Republican River
- Basin countries: United States
- Max. length: 9 mi (14 km)
- Surface area: 13,250 acres (5,360 ha)
- Surface elevation: 1,978 ft (603 m)
- Settlements: Alma, Nebraska, Republican City, Nebraska

The Harlan County Reservoir includes a dam and a reservoir of 13,250 acres (54 km^{2}) located in Harlan County in south-central Nebraska. Its southernmost part extends into northern Phillips County, Kansas. The reservoir is formed by a dam constructed by the U.S. Army Corps of Engineers on the Republican River, which starts in Colorado and ends in Kansas.

The two closest towns are Republican City and Alma. Republican City offers fishing supplies, boat rentals, restaurants and cabins. When the lake is at normal pool, Alma is on the shore line of the lake and offers lodging, restaurants, stores, and churches.

== History ==
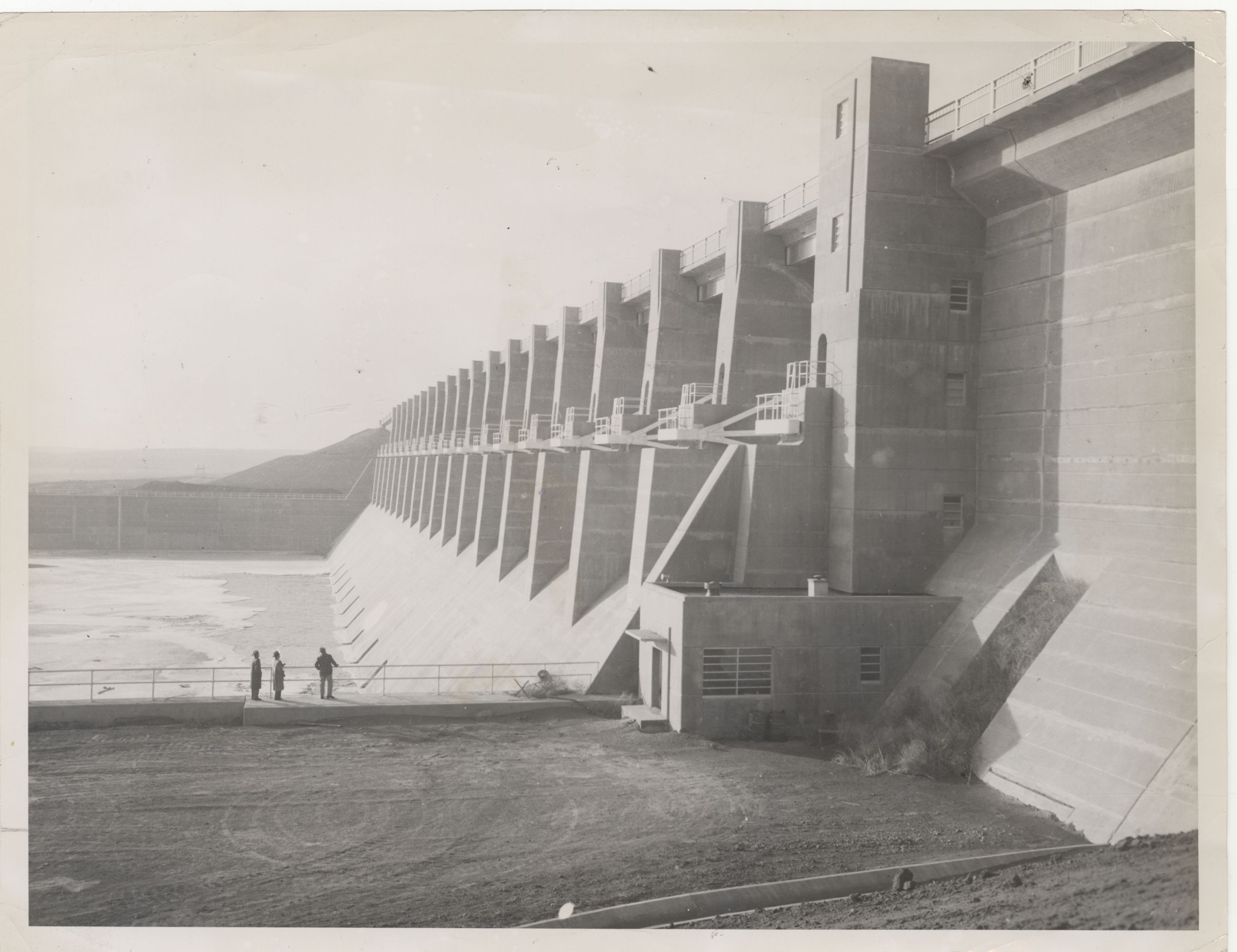
The Harlan County dam in 1954 (photo Touring Club Italiano Historical Archive)

A number of Native American tribes lived in the Republican River Valley throughout history. The Pawnee, Arapahoe and Cheyenne relied on the land for their survival. Early settlers and trappers arrived in the 1850s when the Nebraska Territory was formed. The rich river bottom soil lured many farmers into the area. According to the U.S. Army Corps of Engineers, Native Americans told early settlers not to build big houses close to the river because of the "big water." In 1872, Dr. John McPherson moved from his Brownville, Nebraska home to the river valley. McPherson opened several stores and laid out lots in a town he called Republican. Once a post office was built, the town took the official name of Republican City. The Burlington Railroad reached the town in 1881, creating a booming trade center.

On May 31, 1935, a storm dumped 24 inches (610 mm) of rain on the Republican River watershed, which averaged nine inches (230 mm) annually. The flood wiped out Republican City within minutes, and 100 people lost their lives. Nearly 10,000 cattle were reportedly lost along the Republican River Valley along with 300 county bridges and over 300 miles (480 km) of roads and railway. The flood was responsible for over $26 million in damages.

The town moved to avoid further damage, and the U.S. Army Corps of Engineers researched a potential location for the dam would work the best to prevent such flood loss. They chose an area between Republican City and Naponee. Republican City was rebuilt two miles (3.2 km) north on higher ground in 1952, with a few original buildings. Some of the original buildings' foundations are visible when the water level is low.

== Geography ==
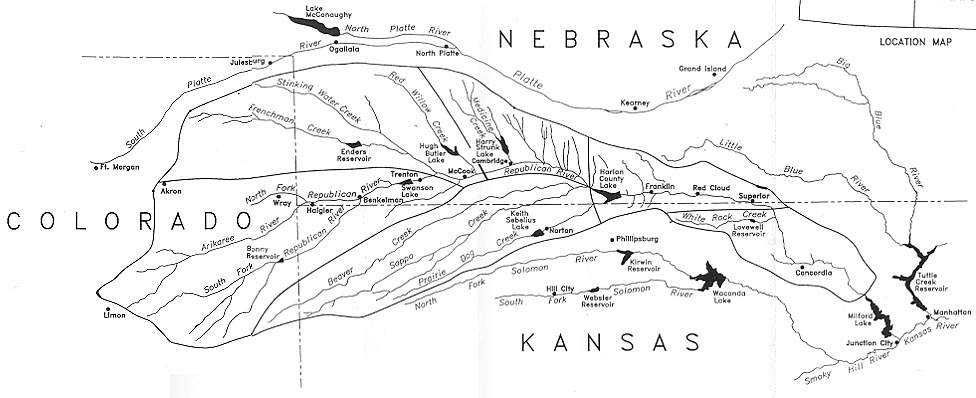
The route of the Republican River

With a surface covering 13,250 acres (54 km^{2}), the Harlan County Reservoir lake sits in bottom lands of the Republican River Valley. Located seven miles (11 km) from the Nebraska/Kansas border, the lake is nine miles (14 km) long and has about 75 miles (121 km) of shore line. The Reservoir's dam sits on the Republican River two miles (3.2 km) south of Republican City. According to the U.S. Army Corps of Engineers, the river valley got its name from the Republican Pawnee Indian tribe who inhabited the area. The land consists of thick trees and brush as most river bottoms do. Harlan County Reservoir is Nebraska's second largest lake.

== Ecology ==
The lake is under the management of the U.S. Army Corps of Engineers. The Corps also manages 17,750 acres (72 km^{2}) surrounding the lake as well as the Republican River near the lake. Corps staff conduct safety inspections on the dam, working directly with the Kansas District Water Management to determine how much water is released from the reservoir into the Republican River. Corps Staff are also responsible for the upkeeps of the roads, utility systems, campsites, beaches, boat ramps, and picnic areas in and around the lake. The Corps also works directly with Nebraska Game and Parks Commission to manage the natural resources of Harlan County Lake.

=== Fish ===
The Harlan County Lake has fish species such as walleye, white bass, wipers, catfish, crappie and pike. Ice fishing is popular on the reservoir as well.

=== Birds ===
According to the Nebraska Birding Trails website, birds found at Harlan County Reservoir have included common loon, black-legged kittiwake, parasitic jaeger, little blue heron, white-faced ibis, and Sabine's gull. Bald eagles are also often spotted in the latter fall and winter months, especially at the Western end of the lake near Alma. Many migratory birds rely on Harlan county Reservoir each year as they pass through. With an abundance of water in the lake and river, and the thousands of acres of green wheat and corn stalks, this area is crucial as the thousands of ducks and geese fly south to their mating grounds.

=== Mammals ===
The shoreline and rivers surrounding the reservoir sustain many mammal species. Beaver and muskrat use the muddy banks of the small creeks and streams in and out of the lake as habitat. This is a prime area for such creatures needing the smaller willows and trees to make their dams and huts. The thick brush of the river bottom ground is some of the state's best whitetail deer hunting habitat. Field mice, moles, ground squirrels, rabbits, raccoons, opossum, skunk, badger, coyote, bobcat and many more rely on the habitat supported by the lake for their survival.

=== Plants ===
The main habitat of the Harlan County Lake area is mixed prairie grasses. According to the U.S. Army Corps of Engineers these prairies consist of Big and Little Bluestem, Indian grass, western wheatgrass, buffalo grass, blue gramma and switch grass. Much of the area is covered by trees and brush as well. A strand of Cottonwood, ash, cedar, and maple trees just to name a few are found all along the Republican River and other lowland inlets leading up to the lake. The plants of any ecosystem make up most of the habitat.

== Land maintenance ==
A current issue at Harlan County Lake has been a problem of invasive feral hogs destroying a lot of farmland and wildlife habitat while also increasing the chance of introducing disease to other wildlife and domestic hogs in the area. In February 2008 the Nebraska Game and Parks and U.S. Army Corps of Engineers exterminated 69 feral hogs from the Harlan County Lake area. They were shot from a helicopter by a professional sharpshooter from the Kansas Wildlife Services. A large amount of native prairie and woodland have been converted back over the years in the area. Over 300,000 trees have been planted and 2,000 acres (8 km^{2}) of native prairie have been planted using funds from the Nebraska Game and Parks Commission Habitat Stamp Program.

== See also ==
- List of Nebraska lakes
- List of Nebraska fish
- List of Nebraska rivers
- List of Nebraska streams
- U.S. Army Corps of Engineers
