= Antelope Township, Harlan County, Nebraska =

Antelope Township
- Township
- Location in Harlan County
- Coordinates: 40°18′23″N 099°14′16″W
- Country: United States
- State: Nebraska
- County: Harlan

Area
  - Total: 35.9 sq mi (93.1 km^{2})
  - Land: 35.9 sq mi (93.1 km^{2})
  - Water: 0 sq mi (0 km^{2}) 0%
- Elevation: 2,254 ft (687 m)

Population (2000)
  - Total: 143
  - Density: 3.9/sq mi (1.5/km^{2})
- GNIS feature ID: 0837855

Antelope Township is one of sixteen townships in Harlan County, Nebraska, United States. The population was 143 at the 2000 census. A 2006 estimate placed the township's population at 130.

Most of the Village of Ragan lies within the Township.

== See also ==
- County government in Nebraska
