= Spring Grove Township, Harlan County, Nebraska =

Spring Grove Township
- Township
- Location in Harlan County
- Coordinates: 40°18′51″N 099°34′40″W
- Country: United States
- State: Nebraska
- County: Harlan

Area
  - Total: 36.15 sq mi (93.62 km^{2})
  - Land: 36.12 sq mi (93.55 km^{2})
  - Water: 0.023 sq mi (0.06 km^{2}) 0.06%
- Elevation: 2,162 ft (659 m)

Population (2000)
  - Total: 75
  - Density: 2.1/sq mi (0.8/km^{2})
- GNIS feature ID: 0838268

Spring Grove Township is one of sixteen townships in Harlan County, Nebraska, United States. The population was 75 at the 2000 census. A 2006 estimate placed the township's population at 69.

== See also ==
- County government in Nebraska
