= Orleans, Nebraska =

- Village
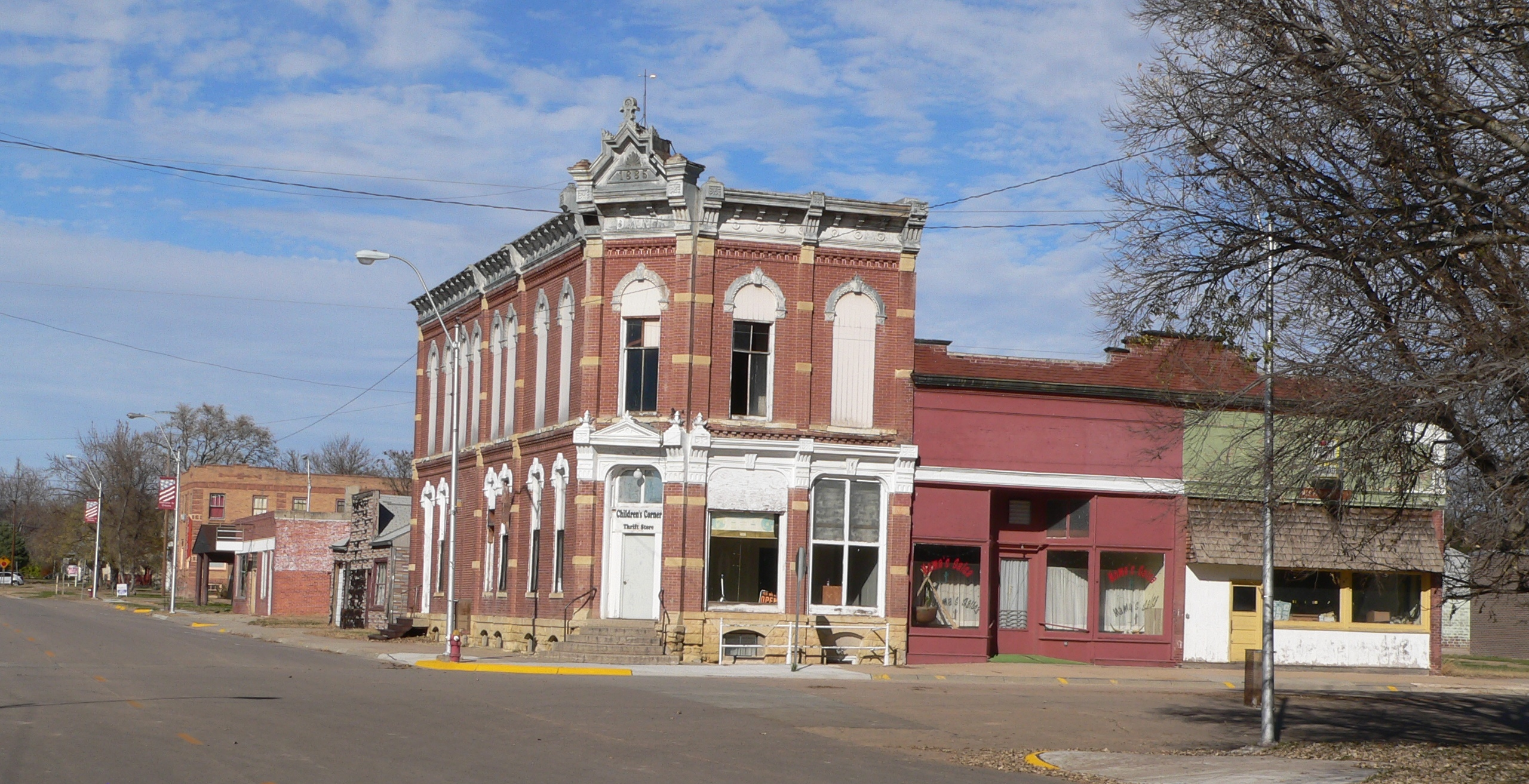
- Downtown Orleans: corner of Orleans Ave. and Maple St.

- Location of Orleans, Nebraska

- Location within Nebraska Location within the United States
- Coordinates: 40°07′54″N 99°27′18″W
- Country: United States
- State: Nebraska
- County: Harlan
- Township: Orleans

Area
  - Total: 0.60 sq mi (1.55 km^{2})
  - Land: 0.60 sq mi (1.55 km^{2})
  - Water: 0 sq mi (0.00 km^{2})
- Elevation: 2,024 ft (617 m)

Population (2020)
  - Total: 341
  - Density: 568.5/sq mi (219.49/km^{2})
- Time zone: UTC-6 (Central (CST))
  - Summer (DST): UTC-5 (CDT)
- ZIP code: 68966
- Area code: 308
- FIPS code: 31-37420
- GNIS feature ID: 2399587

Orleans is a village in Harlan County, Nebraska, United States. The population was 341 at the 2020 census.

== History ==
Some of the first settlers around Orleans were forty men from eastern Nebraska who camped nearby in August 1870 and began staking homestead claims.

The hamlet of Orleans was founded in the 1870s. It was likely named after Orleans, Massachusetts.

== Geography ==
According to the United States Census Bureau, the village has a total area of 0.60 square miles (1.55 km^{2}), all land.

=== Climate ===
Climate data for Orleans, Nebraska (coordinates:40.1290°N 99.4512°W, 1991-2020)
Month	Jan	Feb	Mar	Apr	May	Jun	Jul	Aug	Sep	Oct	Nov	Dec	Year
Average precipitation inches (mm)	0.39 (9.9)	0.54 (14)	1.41 (36)	2.49 (63)	4.34 (110)	3.71 (94)	3.71 (94)	3.22 (82)	1.88 (48)	1.97 (50)	0.82 (21)	0.67 (17)	25.15 (638.9)
Source: NOAA

== Demographics ==
Historical population
Census	Pop.	Note	%±
1880	409		—
1890	812		98.5%
1900	656		−19.2%
1910	942		43.6%
1920	954		1.3%
1930	985		3.2%
1940	815		−17.3%
1950	956		17.3%
1960	608		−36.4%
1970	592		−2.6%
1980	527		−11.0%
1990	490		−7.0%
2000	425		−13.3%
2010	386		−9.2%
2020	341		−11.7%
U.S. Decennial Census

=== 2010 census ===
As of the census of 2010, there were 386 people, 190 households, and 108 families living in the village. The population density was 643.3 inhabitants per square mile (248.4/km^{2}). There were 258 housing units at an average density of 430.0 per square mile (166.0/km^{2}). The racial makeup of the village was 98.7% White, 0.5% Asian, and 0.8% from other races. Hispanic or Latino of any race were 1.6% of the population.

There were 190 households, of which 17.9% had children under the age of 18 living with them, 47.9% were married couples living together, 5.3% had a female householder with no husband present, 3.7% had a male householder with no wife present, and 43.2% were non-families. 36.8% of all households were made up of individuals, and 17.4% had someone living alone who was 65 years of age or older. The average household size was 2.03 and the average family size was 2.63.

The median age in the village was 50 years. 15.8% of residents were under the age of 18; 6.7% were between the ages of 18 and 24; 19.7% were from 25 to 44; 29.7% were from 45 to 64; and 28.2% were 65 years of age or older. The gender makeup of the village was 51.0% male and 49.0% female.

=== 2000 census ===
As of the census of 2000, there were 425 people, 203 households, and 119 families living in the village. The population density was 701.9 inhabitants per square mile (271.0/km^{2}). There were 240 housing units at an average density of 396.4 per square mile (153.1/km^{2}). The racial makeup of the village was 98.82% White, 0.24% Native American, 0.24% Asian, and 0.71% from two or more races. Hispanic or Latino of any race were 1.18% of the population.

There were 203 households, out of which 20.7% had children under the age of 18 living with them, 51.7% were married couples living together, 5.9% had a female householder with no husband present, and 40.9% were non-families. 36.0% of all households were made up of individuals, and 18.2% had someone living alone who was 65 years of age or older. The average household size was 2.09 and the average family size was 2.68.

In the village, the population was spread out, with 18.6% under the age of 18, 5.6% from 18 to 24, 20.5% from 25 to 44, 28.2% from 45 to 64, and 27.1% who were 65 years of age or older. The median age was 49 years. For every 100 females, there were 88.9 males. For every 100 females age 18 and over, there were 88.0 males.

As of 2000 the median income for a household in the village was $25,179, and the median income for a family was $28,056. Males had a median income of $25,208 versus $16,875 for females. The per capita income for the village was $13,015. About 16.9% of families and 16.8% of the population were below the poverty line, including 29.8% of those under age 18 and 8.9% of those age 65 or over.

== Notable people ==
- Donald Roe Ross, United States federal court judge, was born in Orleans.
- Robert E. Rundle, chemist and crystallographer
- Constantine Scollen, missionary, was resident priest in 1896.
- Eliza Suggs, author and temperance activist
