= Alma Township, Harlan County, Nebraska =

Alma Township
- Township
- Location in Harlan County
- Coordinates: 40°07′32″N 099°20′44″W
- Country: United States
- State: Nebraska
- County: Harlan

Area
  - Total: 35.16 sq mi (91.06 km^{2})
  - Land: 34.17 sq mi (88.51 km^{2})
  - Water: 0.98 sq mi (2.55 km^{2}) 2.8%
- Elevation: 2,090 ft (637 m)

Population (2000)
  - Total: 213
  - Density: 6.2/sq mi (2.4/km^{2})
- GNIS feature ID: 0837850

Alma Township is one of sixteen townships in Harlan County, Nebraska, United States. The population was 213 at the 2000 census. A 2006 estimate placed the township's population at 195.

== See also ==
- County government in Nebraska
