= David Landis =

American politician (born 1948)

Member of the Nebraska Legislature from the 46th district
- In office 1979–2007
- Preceded by: JoAnn Maxey
- Succeeded by: Danielle Nantkes

Personal details
- Born: June 10, 1948 (age 78) Lincoln, Nebraska, U.S.
- Party: Democratic
- Education: University of Nebraska–Lincoln

David Landis (born June 10, 1948) is an American politician, a former state senator in the unicameral Nebraska Legislature, and a college instructor.

== Personal life ==
He was born in Lincoln, Nebraska and graduated from University of Nebraska–Lincoln in 1970 with a B.A., 1971 with a J.D., and in 1995 with a Masters of Community and Urban Planning. He also got a MPA from the University of Nebraska Omaha in 1984.

== State legislature ==
He was elected in 1978 to represent the 46th Nebraska legislative district and reelected in 1982, 1986, 1990, 1994, 1998, and 2002. Many of the 391 bills he passed in 28 years in the Nebraska Unicameral were consensus measures forged by negotiation which brought contesting parties to agreement. Landis authored more successful bills than any state senator in the history of the state of Nebraska. Senator Landis brokered legislative agreements between labor and management, utilities and ratepayers, big banks and small banks, insurance companies and trial attorneys, and other seemingly intractable foes. Senator Landis passed legislation to create a statewide network of mediation centers, establish a system for negotiated administrative rulemaking in state government, extend the use of arbitration to resolve disputes, and create the state labor-management collective bargaining system.

His negotiations skillset has been developed at training seminars at Harvard, MIT, and the University of Illinois. For fifteen years he taught negotiation courses at the University of Nebraska College of Law and the Department of Public Administration. Senator Landis has three times been the Best Teacher award winner at Doane College. His negotiation workshop clients include: Internal Revenue Service, Pacific Public Policy Program, National Rural Electric Cooperative Association, State Farm Insurance Co., Western Fire Chiefs Association, Rocky Mountain Public Policy Program, California League of Cities, and the Southwest Leadership Program.

Senator Landis is married to Melodee Ann McPherson. He has two children, Matthew and Melissa, and three grandchildren, Naomi A. McKibbin, Sofia Landis and Stefan Landis. He enjoys music, theater, and doing a Sunday morning radio show on KTGL. He graduated from the University of Nebraska–Lincoln with a B.A. (1970), Juris Doctor (1971) a Masters of Public Administration (1984) and a Masters in Regional and Community Planning (1995).

Since Nebraska voters passed Initiative Measure 415 in 2001 limiting state senators to two terms after 2001, he was unable run for reelection. He was elected to the Lower Platte South Natural Resource District in 2002. And accepted the position of Director of Urban Development in June 2007 when offered the job by Mayor Chris Beutler.

| Preceded by JoAnn Maxey | Nebraska state senator-district 46; 1979–2007 | Succeeded by Danielle Nantkes |

== See also ==
- Nebraska Legislature
