= Huntley, Nebraska =

- Village
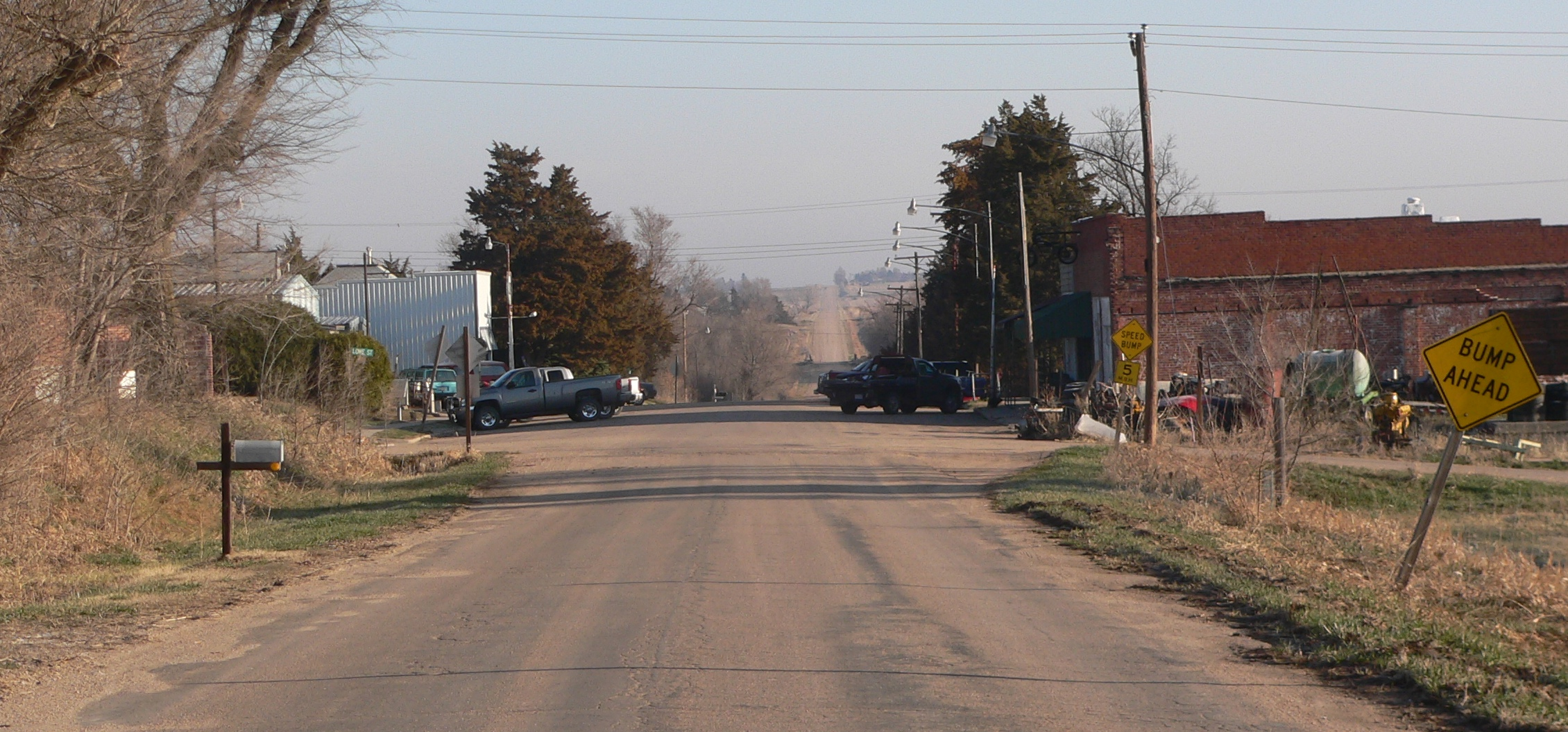
- Downtown Huntley: Division Avenue

- Location of Huntley, Nebraska
- Coordinates: 40°12′38″N 99°17′24″W
- Country: United States
- State: Nebraska
- County: Harlan

Area
  - Total: 0.37 sq mi (0.96 km^{2})
  - Land: 0.37 sq mi (0.96 km^{2})
  - Water: 0 sq mi (0.00 km^{2})
- Elevation: 2,116 ft (645 m)

Population (2020)
  - Total: 33
  - Density: 89/sq mi (34.2/km^{2})
- Time zone: UTC-6 (Central (CST))
  - Summer (DST): UTC-5 (CDT)
- ZIP code: 68971
- Area code: 308
- FIPS code: 31-23550
- GNIS feature ID: 2398563

Huntley is a village in Harlan County, Nebraska, United States. As of the 2020 census, Huntley had a population of 33.

== Geography ==
According to the United States Census Bureau, the village has a total area of 0.35 square miles (0.91 km^{2}), all land.

== Demographics ==
Historical population
Census	Pop.	Note	%±
1920	170		—
1930	179		5.3%
1940	148		−17.3%
1950	98		−33.8%
1960	91		−7.1%
1970	67		−26.4%
1980	64		−4.5%
1990	58		−9.4%
2000	67		15.5%
2010	44		−34.3%
2020	33		−25.0%
U.S. Decennial Census

=== 2010 census ===
As of the census of 2010, there were 44 people, 19 households, and 12 families living in the village. The population density was 125.7 inhabitants per square mile (48.5/km^{2}). There were 24 housing units at an average density of 68.6 per square mile (26.5/km^{2}). The racial makeup of the village was 100.0% White. Hispanic or Latino of any race were 11.4% of the population.

There were 19 households, of which 21.1% had children under the age of 18 living with them, 63.2% were married couples living together, and 36.8% were non-families. 36.8% of all households were made up of individuals. The average household size was 2.32 and the average family size was 3.08.

The median age in the village was 47 years. 25% of residents were under the age of 18; 4.6% were between the ages of 18 and 24; 13.6% were from 25 to 44; 47.7% were from 45 to 64; and 9.1% were 65 years of age or older. The gender makeup of the village was 47.7% male and 52.3% female.

=== 2000 census ===
As of the census of 2000, there were 67 people, 25 households, and 18 families living in the village. The population density was 190.3 inhabitants per square mile (73.5/km^{2}). There were 28 housing units at an average density of 79.5 per square mile (30.7/km^{2}). The racial makeup of the village was 100.00% White. Hispanic or Latino of any race were 1.49% of the population.

There were 25 households, out of which 36.0% had children under the age of 18 living with them, 68.0% were married couples living together, 4.0% had a female householder with no husband present, and 28.0% were non-families. 24.0% of all households were made up of individuals, and 8.0% had someone living alone who was 65 years of age or older. The average household size was 2.68 and the average family size was 3.28.

In the village, the population was spread out, with 29.9% under the age of 18, 4.5% from 18 to 24, 38.8% from 25 to 44, 17.9% from 45 to 64, and 9.0% who were 65 years of age or older. The median age was 38 years. For every 100 females, there were 139.3 males. For every 100 females age 18 and over, there were 123.8 males.

As of 2000 the median income for a household in the village was $41,250, and the median income for a family was $42,917. Males had a median income of $25,000 versus $18,750 for females. The per capita income for the village was $16,375. There were 4.3% of families and 5.3% of the population living below the poverty line, including no under eighteens and 20.0% of those over 64.
