= Antelope Township, Franklin County, Nebraska =

Antelope Township
- Township
- Interactive map of Antelope Township
- Coordinates: 40°18′19″N 098°53′42″W
- Country: United States
- State: Nebraska
- County: Franklin County
- Elevation: 2,152 ft (656 m)

Population (2010)
  - Total: 218
- Time zone: UTC-6 (CST)
  - Summer (DST): UTC-5 (CDT)
- FIPS code: 31-01605
- GNIS feature ID: 837854

Antelope is one of thirteen townships in Franklin County, Nebraska, United States. The population was 218 at the 2010 census.
