= Ragan, Nebraska =

- Village
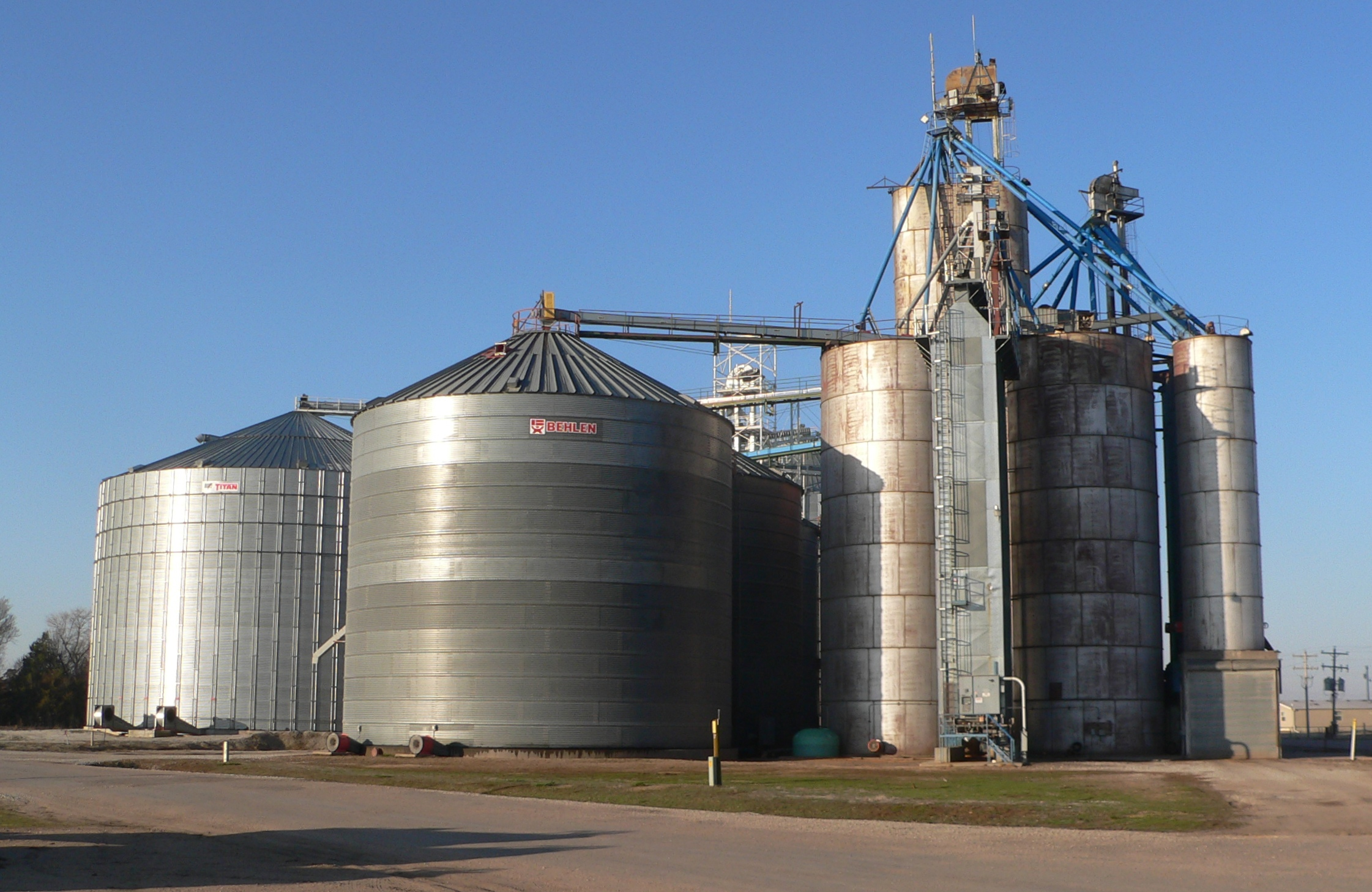
- Grain elevator in Ragan

- Location of Ragan, Nebraska
- Coordinates: 40°18′39″N 99°17′23″W
- Country: United States
- State: Nebraska
- County: Harlan

Area
  - Total: 0.25 sq mi (0.66 km^{2})
  - Land: 0.25 sq mi (0.66 km^{2})
  - Water: 0 sq mi (0.00 km^{2})
- Elevation: 2,330 ft (710 m)

Population (2020)
  - Total: 22
  - Density: 86.9/sq mi (33.57/km^{2})
- Time zone: UTC-6 (Central (CST))
  - Summer (DST): UTC-5 (CDT)
- ZIP code: 68969
- Area code: 308
- FIPS code: 31-40570
- GNIS feature ID: 2399036

Ragan is a village in Harlan County, Nebraska, United States. As of the 2020 census, Ragan had a population of 22.

== History ==
Ragan was platted in 1886 when the St. Joseph and Grand Island Railway was extended to that point. It was named after a railroad-company lawyer.

== Geography ==
According to the United States Census Bureau, the village has a total area of 0.25 square miles (0.65 km^{2}), all land.

Climate data for Ragan (1991-2020)
| Month | Jan | Feb | Mar | Apr | May | Jun | Jul | Aug | Sep | Oct | Nov | Dec | Year |
|---|---|---|---|---|---|---|---|---|---|---|---|---|---|
| Mean daily maximum °F (°C) | 37.3 (2.9) | 41.3 (5.2) | 53.4 (11.9) | 63.4 (17.4) | 72.4 (22.4) | 83.8 (28.8) | 88.7 (31.5) | 86.3 (30.2) | 78.5 (25.8) | 65.7 (18.7) | 51.9 (11.1) | 39.2 (4.0) | 63.5 (17.5) |
| Daily mean °F (°C) | 26.6 (−3.0) | 30.6 (−0.8) | 40.7 (4.8) | 50.7 (10.4) | 60.6 (15.9) | 71.9 (22.2) | 76.7 (24.8) | 74.4 (23.6) | 66.0 (18.9) | 52.8 (11.6) | 39.8 (4.3) | 29.1 (−1.6) | 51.7 (10.9) |
| Mean daily minimum °F (°C) | 16.0 (−8.9) | 20.0 (−6.7) | 28.0 (−2.2) | 37.9 (3.3) | 49.3 (9.6) | 59.9 (15.5) | 64.7 (18.2) | 62.5 (16.9) | 53.5 (11.9) | 40.0 (4.4) | 27.6 (−2.4) | 19.0 (−7.2) | 39.9 (4.4) |
| Average precipitation inches (mm) | 0.47 (12) | 0.62 (16) | 1.40 (36) | 2.48 (63) | 4.35 (110) | 3.53 (90) | 4.09 (104) | 3.09 (78) | 1.80 (46) | 1.91 (49) | 0.97 (25) | 0.65 (17) | 25.36 (646) |
| Average snowfall inches (cm) | 5.8 (15) | 5.0 (13) | 4.0 (10) | 1.9 (4.8) | 0.0 (0.0) | 0.0 (0.0) | 0.0 (0.0) | 0.0 (0.0) | 0.0 (0.0) | 0.9 (2.3) | 2.8 (7.1) | 3.2 (8.1) | 23.6 (60.3) |
| Average precipitation days (≥ 0.01 in) | 3 | 3.5 | 4.9 | 7.5 | 9.9 | 8.5 | 7.5 | 6.5 | 5.4 | 5.4 | 3.5 | 3 | 68.6 |
| Average snowy days (≥ 0.01 in) | 3 | 2.5 | 1.6 | 0.9 | 0 | 0 | 0 | 0 | 0 | 0.4 | 1.5 | 2.5 | 12.4 |
Source: NOAA

== Demographics ==
Historical population
| Census | Pop. | Note | %± |
|---|---|---|---|
| 1900 | 208 | | — |
| 1910 | 214 | | 2.9% |
| 1920 | 222 | | 3.7% |
| 1930 | 216 | | −2.7% |
| 1940 | 163 | | −24.5% |
| 1950 | 102 | | −37.4% |
| 1960 | 90 | | −11.8% |
| 1970 | 60 | | −33.3% |
| 1980 | 71 | | 18.3% |
| 1990 | 59 | | −16.9% |
| 2000 | 46 | | −22.0% |
| 2010 | 38 | | −17.4% |
| 2020 | 22 | | −42.1% |
U.S. Decennial Census

=== 2010 census ===
As of the census of 2010, there were 38 people, 18 households, and 10 families living in the village. The population density was 152.0 inhabitants per square mile (58.7/km^{2}). There were 25 housing units at an average density of 100.0 per square mile (38.6/km^{2}). The racial makeup of the village was 100.0% White.

There were 18 households, of which 11.1% had children under the age of 18 living with them, 55.6% were married couples living together, and 44.4% were non-families. 33.3% of all households were made up of individuals, and 11.2% had someone living alone who was 65 years of age or older. The average household size was 2.11 and the average family size was 2.80.

The median age in the village was 50.5 years. 13.2% of residents were under the age of 18; 7.8% were between the ages of 18 and 24; 5.3% were from 25 to 44; 55.3% were from 45 to 64; and 18.4% were 65 years of age or older. The gender makeup of the village was 44.7% male and 55.3% female.

=== 2000 census ===
As of the census of 2000, there were 46 people, 19 households, and 12 families living in the village. The population density was 182.5 inhabitants per square mile (70.5/km^{2}). There were 26 housing units at an average density of 103.1 per square mile (39.8/km^{2}). The racial makeup of the village was 100.00% White. Hispanic or Latino of any race were 2.17% of the population.

There were 19 households, out of which 15.8% had children under the age of 18 living with them, 47.4% were married couples living together, 10.5% had a female householder with no husband present, and 31.6% were non-families. 21.1% of all households were made up of individuals, and none had someone living alone who was 65 years of age or older. The average household size was 2.42 and the average family size was 2.77.

In the village, the population was spread out, with 21.7% under the age of 18, 6.5% from 18 to 24, 28.3% from 25 to 44, 30.4% from 45 to 64, and 13.0% who were 65 years of age or older. The median age was 41 years. For every 100 females, there were 109.1 males. For every 100 females age 18 and over, there were 100.0 males.

As of 2000 the median income for a household in the village was $32,083, and the median income for a family was $40,000. Males had a median income of $30,000 versus $19,167 for females. The per capita income for the village was $17,758. None of the population and none of the families were below the poverty line.
