= Emerson Township, Harlan County, Nebraska =

Emerson Township
- Township
- Location in Harlan County
- Coordinates: 40°13′17″N 099°34′37″W
- Country: United States
- State: Nebraska
- County: Harlan

Area
  - Total: 36.05 sq mi (93.37 km^{2})
  - Land: 35.62 sq mi (92.25 km^{2})
  - Water: 0.43 sq mi (1.12 km^{2}) 1.2%
- Elevation: 2,030 ft (620 m)

Population (2000)
  - Total: 307
  - Density: 8.5/sq mi (3.3/km^{2})
- GNIS feature ID: 0837991

Emerson Township is one of sixteen townships in Harlan County, Nebraska, United States. The population was 307 at the 2000 census. A 2006 estimate placed the township's population at 276.

A portion of the Village of Oxford lies within the Township.

== See also ==
- County government in Nebraska
