= Harlan County, Nebraska =

County in the United States

- County
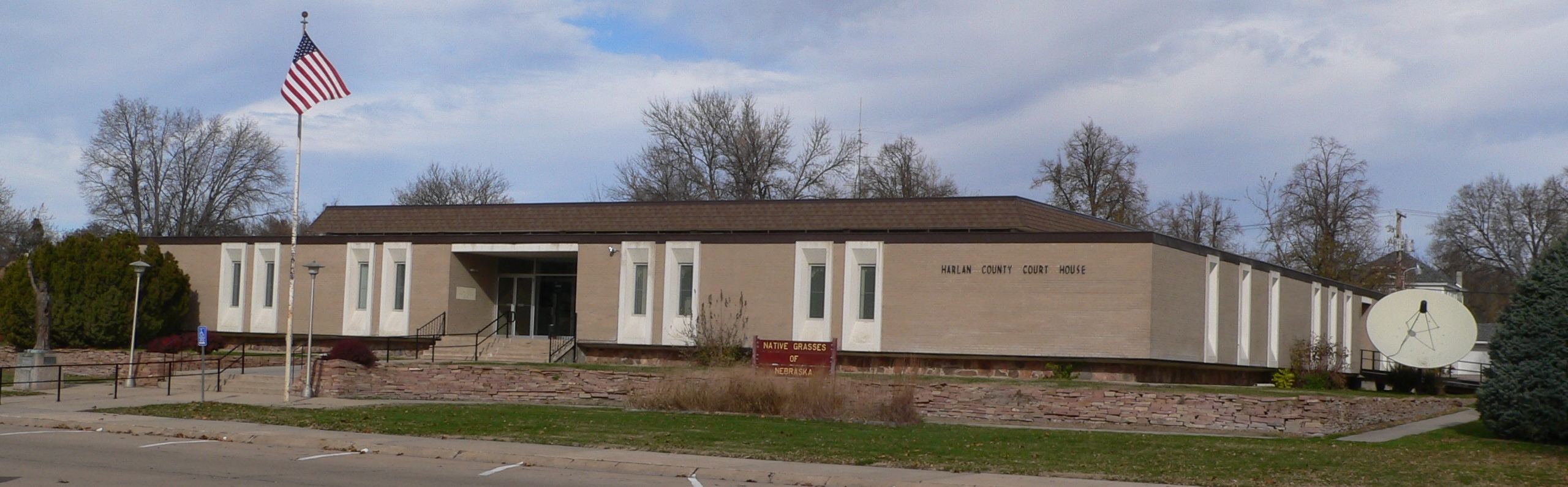
- Harlan County Courthouse in Alma

- Location within the U.S. state of Nebraska
- Coordinates: 40°10′N 99°24′W
- Country: United States
- State: Nebraska
- Founded: 1871
- Seat: Alma
- Largest city: Alma

Area
  - Total: 574 sq mi (1,490 km^{2})
  - Land: 553 sq mi (1,430 km^{2})
  - Water: 21 sq mi (54 km^{2}) 3.6%

Population (2020)
  - Total: 3,073
  - Estimate (2025): 3,000 ▼
  - Density: 6.2/sq mi (2.4/km^{2})
- Time zone: UTC−6 (Central)
  - Summer (DST): UTC−5 (CDT)
- Congressional district: 3rd
- Website: www.harlancounty.ne.gov

Harlan County is a county in the U.S. state of Nebraska. As of the 2020 United States census, the population was 3,073. Its county seat is Alma. The county is home to the Harlan County Reservoir.

In the Nebraska license plate system, Harlan County is represented by the prefix 51 (it had the 51st-largest number of vehicles registered in the county when the license plate system was established in 1922).

== History ==
Prior to 1870, the portion of the Republican valley that now includes Harlan County was a prized hunting ground for indigenous peoples, and their efforts to keep intruders away deterred white settlement in the area. The defeat of the Sioux at the Battle of Summit Springs in 1869 largely eliminated this threat, and several parties were organized to explore the agricultural possibilities of the area.

A party of forty men from eastern Nebraska settled near the site of present-day Orleans in August 1870. In 1871, a party from the Wyoming Territory, led by Thomas Harlan, settled near present-day Alma, which was named after a settler's daughter. In that year, Harlan County was separated from Lincoln County by the Nebraska state legislature. Accounts differ as to the county's namesake: either Thomas Harlan, or James Harlan, who was U.S. Secretary of the Interior between 1865 and 1866.

== Geography ==
The Republican River flows southeastward across the lower part of Harlan County, being impounded by the Harlan County Lake at the SE corner of the county. The terrain consists of gently rolling low hills, with the majority of flat areas being used for center pivot irrigation.

The county has a total area of 574 square miles (1,490 km^{2}), of which 553 square miles (1,430 km^{2}) is land and 21 square miles (54 km^{2}) (3.6%) is water.

=== Major highways ===
- U.S. Highway 6
- U.S. Highway 34
- U.S. Highway 183
- Nebraska Highway 4
- Nebraska Highway 46
- Nebraska Highway 89

=== Adjacent counties ===
- Phelps County - north
- Kearney County - northeast
- Franklin County - east
- Phillips County, Kansas - south
- Norton County, Kansas - southwest
- Furnas County - west

=== Protected areas ===
- South East Sacramento State Wildlife Management Area
- South Sacramento State Wildlife Management Area

== Demographics ==
Historical population
Census	Pop.	Note	%±
1880	6,086		—
1890	8,158		34.0%
1900	9,370		14.9%
1910	9,578		2.2%
1920	9,220		−3.7%
1930	8,951		−2.9%
1940	7,130		−20.3%
1950	7,189		0.8%
1960	5,081		−29.3%
1970	4,357		−14.2%
1980	4,292		−1.5%
1990	3,810		−11.2%
2000	3,786		−0.6%
2010	3,423		−9.6%
2020	3,073		−10.2%
2025 (est.)	3,000	▼	−2.4%
US Decennial Census; 1790-1960 1900-1990; 1990-2000 2010-2013

=== 2020 census ===
As of the 2020 census, the county had a population of 3,073. The median age was 50.9 years. 20.7% of residents were under the age of 18 and 28.1% of residents were 65 years of age or older. For every 100 females there were 103.4 males, and for every 100 females age 18 and over there were 101.0 males age 18 and over.

The racial makeup of the county was 95.2% White, 0.1% Black or African American, 0.5% American Indian and Alaska Native, 0.4% Asian, 0.0% Native Hawaiian and Pacific Islander, 0.6% from some other race, and 3.2% from two or more races. Hispanic or Latino residents of any race comprised 2.9% of the population.

0.0% of residents lived in urban areas, while 100.0% lived in rural areas.

There were 1,355 households in the county, of which 23.8% had children under the age of 18 living with them and 19.0% had a female householder with no spouse or partner present. About 31.8% of all households were made up of individuals and 16.1% had someone living alone who was 65 years of age or older.

There were 1,915 housing units, of which 29.2% were vacant. Among occupied housing units, 81.8% were owner-occupied and 18.2% were renter-occupied. The homeowner vacancy rate was 1.8% and the rental vacancy rate was 9.1%.

=== 2000 census ===
As of the 2000 United States census, there were 3,786 people, 1,597 households, and 1,049 families in the county. The population density was 7 people per square mile (2.7 people/km^{2}). There were 2,327 housing units at an average density of 4 units per square mile (1.5/km^{2}). The racial makeup of the county was 98.86% White, 0.13% Black or African American, 0.11% Native American, 0.08% Asian, 0.03% Pacific Islander, 0.16% from other races, and 0.63% from two or more races. 0.77% of the population were Hispanic or Latino of any race.

There were 1,597 households, out of which 25.70% had children under the age of 18 living with them, 59.00% were married couples living together, 4.30% had a female householder with no husband present, and 34.30% were non-families. 30.80% of all households were made up of individuals, and 16.70% had someone living alone who was 65 years of age or older. The average household size was 2.34 and the average family size was 2.93.

The county population contained 24.20% under the age of 18, 5.00% from 18 to 24, 21.60% from 25 to 44, 26.20% from 45 to 64, and 23.00% who were 65 years of age or older. The median age was 44 years. For every 100 females there were 98.00 males. For every 100 females age 18 and over, there were 96.80 males.

The median income for a household in the county was $30,679, and the median income for a family was $36,875. Males had a median income of $27,580 versus $18,411 for females. The per capita income for the county was $15,618. About 7.00% of families and 10.10% of the population were below the poverty line, including 14.40% of those under age 18 and 9.10% of those age 65 or over.

== Communities ==
=== City ===
- Alma (county seat)

=== Villages ===
- Huntley
- Orleans
- Oxford (partial)
- Ragan
- Republican City
- Stamford

=== Unincorporated communities ===
- Mascot
- Oxford Junction

=== Townships ===
- Albany
- Alma
- Antelope
- Eldorado
- Emerson
- Fairfield
- Mullally
- Orleans
- Prairie Dog
- Republican City
- Reuben
- Sappa
- Scandinavia
- Spring Grove
- Turkey Creek
- Washington

== Politics ==
Harlan County voters are reliably Republican. In no national election since 1936 has the county selected the Democratic Party candidate.

United States presidential election results for Harlan County, Nebraska
Year	Republican		Democratic		Third party(ies)	
Year	No.	%	No.	%	No.	%
1900	880	44.74%	977	49.67%	110	5.59%
1904	1,178	57.77%	299	14.66%	562	27.56%
1908	1,081	44.99%	1,158	48.19%	164	6.82%
1912	325	15.78%	918	44.58%	816	39.63%
1916	834	37.48%	1,267	56.94%	124	5.57%
1920	1,756	59.59%	974	33.05%	217	7.36%
1924	1,845	50.01%	1,216	32.96%	628	17.02%
1928	2,702	69.98%	1,055	27.32%	104	2.69%
1932	1,272	32.79%	2,486	64.09%	121	3.12%
1936	1,692	44.36%	2,084	54.64%	38	1.00%
1940	2,182	61.73%	1,353	38.27%	0	0.00%
1944	1,991	66.43%	1,006	33.57%	0	0.00%
1948	1,490	54.98%	1,220	45.02%	0	0.00%
1952	2,300	75.91%	730	24.09%	0	0.00%
1956	1,850	68.57%	848	31.43%	0	0.00%
1960	1,766	66.42%	893	33.58%	0	0.00%
1964	1,283	51.78%	1,195	48.22%	0	0.00%
1968	1,392	64.03%	579	26.63%	203	9.34%
1972	1,549	74.19%	539	25.81%	0	0.00%
1976	1,325	58.76%	879	38.98%	51	2.26%
1980	1,690	72.94%	486	20.98%	141	6.09%
1984	1,692	76.80%	493	22.38%	18	0.82%
1988	1,403	65.13%	725	33.66%	26	1.21%
1992	992	46.88%	488	23.06%	636	30.06%
1996	1,120	60.28%	520	27.99%	218	11.73%
2000	1,358	73.33%	438	23.65%	56	3.02%
2004	1,467	77.33%	398	20.98%	32	1.69%
2008	1,329	75.25%	402	22.76%	35	1.98%
2012	1,395	78.46%	354	19.91%	29	1.63%
2016	1,496	81.66%	254	13.86%	82	4.48%
2020	1,615	83.51%	282	14.58%	37	1.91%
2024	1,506	83.43%	280	15.51%	19	1.05%

== See also ==
- National Register of Historic Places listings in Harlan County, Nebraska
