= Curtis, Nebraska =

City in Frontier County, Nebraska, United States

- City
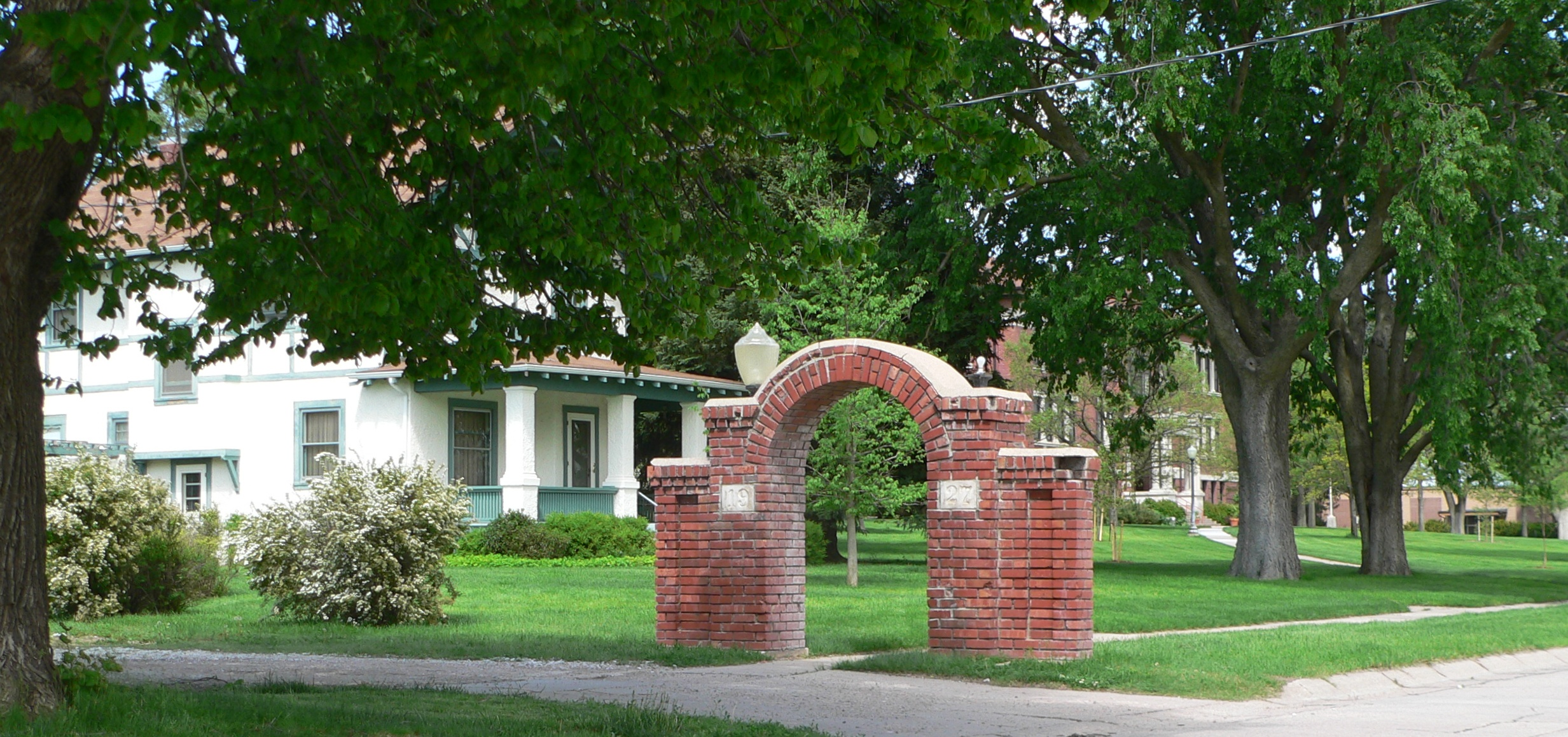
- Nebraska College of Technical Agriculture (2010)

- Location within Frontier County and Nebraska

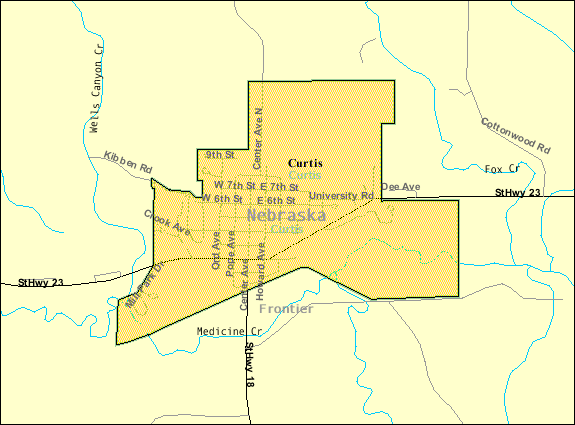
- Detailed map of Curtis
- Coordinates: 40°37′51″N 100°29′53″W
- Country: United States
- State: Nebraska
- County: Frontier
- Founded: 1886
- Named for: local trapper

Area
  - Total: 1.20 sq mi (3.11 km^{2})
  - Land: 1.20 sq mi (3.11 km^{2})
  - Water: 0 sq mi (0.00 km^{2})
- Elevation: 2,585 ft (788 m)

Population (2020)
  - Total: 806
  - Density: 671/sq mi (259/km^{2})
- Time zone: UTC−6 (CST)
  - Summer (DST): UTC−5 (CDT)
- ZIP Code: 69025
- Area code: 308
- FIPS code: 31-11825
- GNIS ID: 2393700
- Website: curtis-ne.gov

Curtis is a city in Frontier County, Nebraska, United States. As of the 2020 census, the population of the city was 806. It is home to the Nebraska College of Technical Agriculture.

== History ==
Curtis was laid out in 1886, soon after the railroad was extended to that point. The community has the name of a trapper who operated in the area. Curtis is home to Medicine Valley Schools, which was formed in 1969. The school name is derived from its location in the Medicine Creek Valley.

Curtis describes itself as "Nebraska's Easter City", and presents an annual pageant on Palm Sunday.

In 2021, the town proposed a program to increase the population offering free land if you have a house built and financial incentives for enrolling children into the public school system.

== Geography ==
According to the United States Census Bureau, the city has a total area of 1.20 square miles (3.11 km^{2}), all land.

=== Climate ===
Climate data for Curtis, Nebraska (1991–2020 normals, extremes 1893–present)
Month	Jan	Feb	Mar	Apr	May	Jun	Jul	Aug	Sep	Oct	Nov	Dec	Year
Record high °F (°C)	77 (25)	80 (27)	92 (33)	96 (36)	102 (39)	113 (45)	114 (46)	111 (44)	108 (42)	97 (36)	85 (29)	78 (26)	114 (46)
Mean maximum °F (°C)	64.1 (17.8)	68.4 (20.2)	77.6 (25.3)	86.4 (30.2)	91.8 (33.2)	98.3 (36.8)	102.8 (39.3)	100.8 (38.2)	96.9 (36.1)	88.7 (31.5)	76.1 (24.5)	65.3 (18.5)	103.9 (39.9)
Mean daily maximum °F (°C)	41.8 (5.4)	45.0 (7.2)	57.1 (13.9)	66.0 (18.9)	75.1 (23.9)	85.9 (29.9)	91.4 (33.0)	89.4 (31.9)	82.3 (27.9)	68.9 (20.5)	54.9 (12.7)	43.1 (6.2)	66.7 (19.3)
Daily mean °F (°C)	27.7 (−2.4)	30.7 (−0.7)	41.3 (5.2)	50.8 (10.4)	60.9 (16.1)	72.1 (22.3)	77.0 (25.0)	75.0 (23.9)	66.2 (19.0)	52.7 (11.5)	39.5 (4.2)	29.1 (−1.6)	51.9 (11.1)
Mean daily minimum °F (°C)	13.5 (−10.3)	16.4 (−8.7)	25.5 (−3.6)	35.6 (2.0)	46.6 (8.1)	58.2 (14.6)	62.7 (17.1)	60.5 (15.8)	50.1 (10.1)	36.5 (2.5)	24.0 (−4.4)	15.2 (−9.3)	37.1 (2.8)
Mean minimum °F (°C)	−7.3 (−21.8)	−3.4 (−19.7)	7.2 (−13.8)	20.7 (−6.3)	31.2 (−0.4)	44.4 (6.9)	52.2 (11.2)	50.0 (10.0)	34.8 (1.6)	20.8 (−6.2)	5.8 (−14.6)	−4.3 (−20.2)	−12.3 (−24.6)
Record low °F (°C)	−32 (−36)	−32 (−36)	−26 (−32)	−1 (−18)	10 (−12)	29 (−2)	39 (4)	34 (1)	20 (−7)	−1 (−18)	−20 (−29)	−33 (−36)	−33 (−36)
Average precipitation inches (mm)	0.35 (8.9)	0.51 (13)	0.93 (24)	2.19 (56)	3.69 (94)	3.66 (93)	2.96 (75)	2.65 (67)	1.51 (38)	1.65 (42)	0.71 (18)	0.49 (12)	21.30 (541)
Average snowfall inches (cm)	5.7 (14)	6.1 (15)	4.7 (12)	3.2 (8.1)	0.4 (1.0)	0.0 (0.0)	0.0 (0.0)	0.0 (0.0)	0.0 (0.0)	1.0 (2.5)	2.5 (6.4)	4.5 (11)	28.1 (71)
Average precipitation days (≥ 0.01 in)	2.8	4.0	5.0	7.1	8.2	8.5	7.3	6.4	4.3	5.1	3.2	2.5	64.4
Average snowy days (≥ 0.1 in)	2.6	3.0	2.1	1.0	0.2	0.0	0.0	0.0	0.0	0.4	1.2	1.8	12.3
Source: NOAA

== Demographics ==
Historical population
Census	Pop.	Note	%±
1890	378		—
1900	435		15.1%
1910	613		40.9%
1920	1,017		65.9%
1930	960		−5.6%
1940	952		−0.8%
1950	964		1.3%
1960	868		−10.0%
1970	1,166		34.3%
1980	1,014		−13.0%
1990	791		−22.0%
2000	832		5.2%
2010	939		12.9%
2020	806		−14.2%
U.S. Decennial Census

=== 2010 census ===
As of the census of 2010, there were 939 people, 365 households, and 193 families residing in the city. The population density was 782.5 inhabitants per square mile (302.1/km^{2}). There were 426 housing units at an average density of 355.0 per square mile (137.1/km^{2}). The racial makeup of the city was 97.7% White, 0.6% Native American, 0.2% Asian, 0.5% from other races, and 1.0% from two or more races. Hispanic or Latino of any race were 1.1% of the population.

There were 365 households, of which 29.0% had children under the age of 18 living with them, 39.7% were married couples living together, 8.2% had a female householder with no husband present, 4.9% had a male householder with no wife present, and 47.1% were non-families. 36.7% of all households were made up of individuals, and 16.7% had someone living alone who was 65 years of age or older. The average household size was 2.26 and the average family size was 2.98.

The median age in the city was 27.6 years. 22.3% of residents were under the age of 18; 23.9% were between the ages of 18 and 24; 20.4% were from 25 to 44; 19.1% were from 45 to 64; and 14.4% were 65 years of age or older. The gender makeup of the city was 49.4% male and 50.6% female.

=== 2000 census ===
As of the census of 2000, there were 832 people, 336 households, and 193 families residing in the city. The population density was 693.0 inhabitants per square mile (267.6/km^{2}). There were 381 housing units at an average density of 317.4 per square mile (122.5/km^{2}). The racial makeup of the city was 96.88% White, 0.24% African American, 0.24% Native American, 0.36% Asian, 0.72% from other races, and 1.56% from two or more races. Hispanic or Latino of any race were 1.44% of the population.

There were 336 households, out of which 28.9% had children under the age of 18 living with them, 50.0% were married couples living together, 6.0% had a female householder with no husband present, and 42.3% were non-families. 35.7% of all households were made up of individuals, and 16.4% had someone living alone who was 65 years of age or older. The average household size was 2.34 and the average family size was 3.11.

In the city, the population was spread out, with 25.0% under the age of 18, 18.4% from 18 to 24, 21.0% from 25 to 44, 18.6% from 45 to 64, and 16.9% who were 65 years of age or older. The median age was 32 years. For every 100 females, there were 104.4 males. For every 100 females age 18 and over, there were 100.6 males.

As of 2000 the median income for a household in the city was $26,667, and the median income for a family was $36,458. Males had a median income of $28,500 versus $16,324 for females. The per capita income for the city was $12,943. About 14.3% of families and 21.1% of the population were below the poverty line, including 19.1% of those under age 18 and 10.2% of those age 65 or over.

== Education ==
It is in the Medicine Valley Public Schools school district.

== Healthcare ==
The Curtis Clinic, which is operated by McCook Community Hospital, was established circa 1995. In 2025 the hospital announced that it will close the clinic as it is not sure it will have enough funding to operate it due to the passage of Donald Trump's One Big Beautiful Bill Act. One monetary source expected to decline is Medicaid.

== See also ==
- List of municipalities in Nebraska
