= Nebraska College of Technical Agriculture =

Public technical college in Curtis, Nebraska, U.S.

Coordinates: 40°38′09″N 100°30′39″W

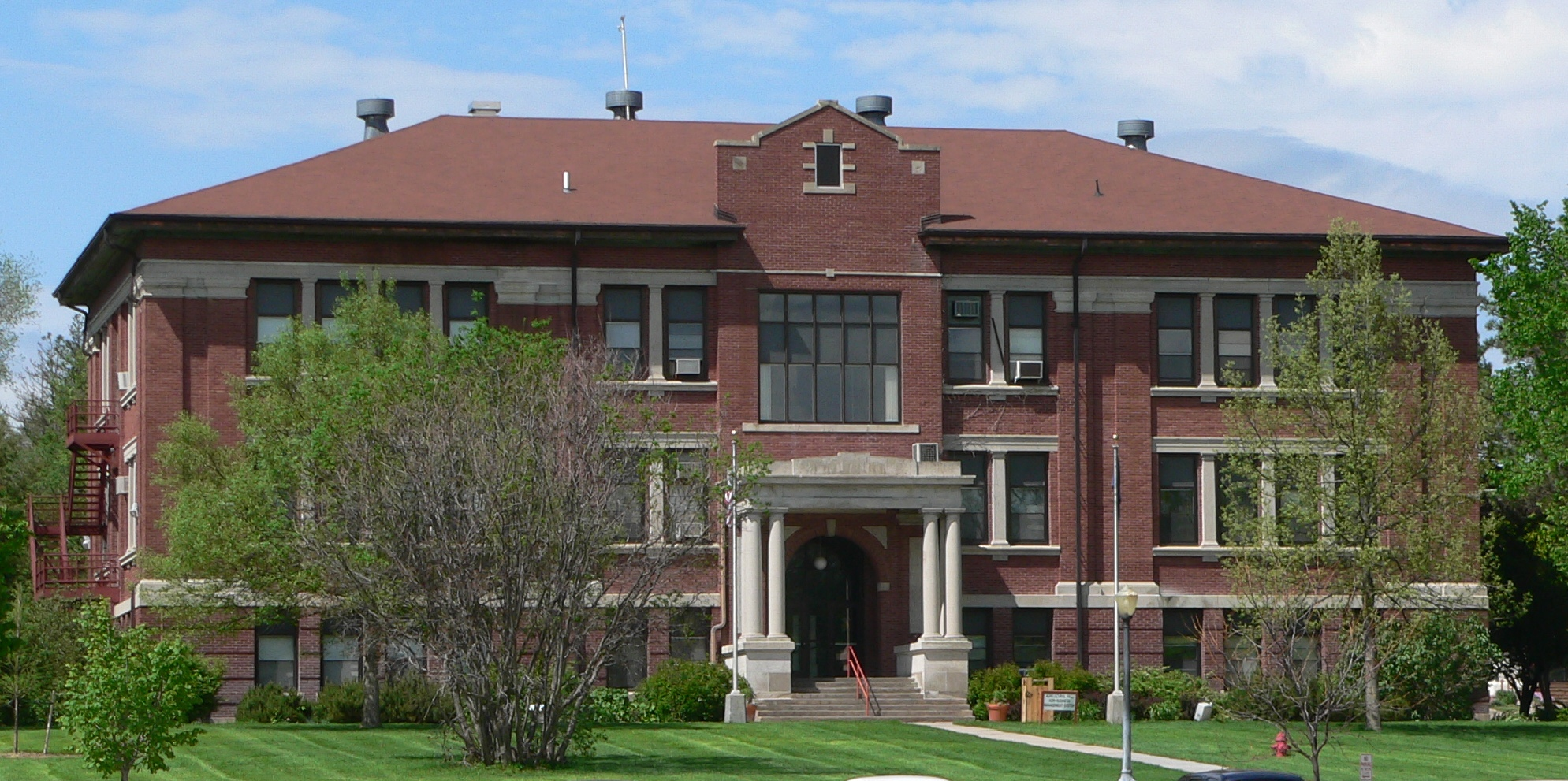
- Agricultural Hall in 2010
- Type: Public technical college
- Established: 1965
- Parent institution: University of Nebraska system
- Students: 300
- Location: Curtis, Nebraska, United States
- Campus: Rural
- Nickname: Aggies
- Website: ncta.unl.edu
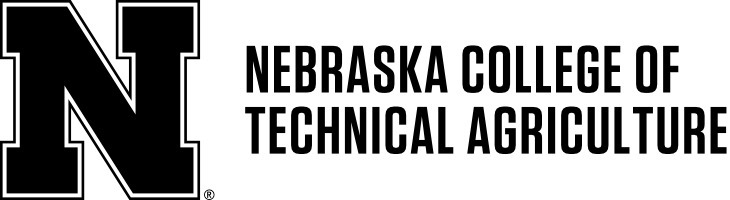

The Nebraska College of Technical Agriculture (UNL–NCTA) is a public technical college in Curtis, Nebraska. It is part of the University of Nebraska system and began operations in 1965.

== History ==
The Nebraska College of Technical Agriculture was preceded by the Nebraska School of Agriculture, which was established in 1895 as a part of the University of Nebraska system. In 1911, the Nebraska Legislature passed a bill to re-establish it as a boarding school for high school students. Curtis was selected as the site for the new school, over 11 other applicants in the state. The main building, now known as Agricultural Hall, was completed in 1913, and the school officially opened that same year.

The school underwent major expansions between 1928 and 1942. Expansions included new dorms, grain elevators, and heating plants. The college also rebranded to the University of Nebraska School of Agriculture in 1946. However, by the late 1950s, enrollment fell, mainly due to how high schools were introducing their own technical classes. In 1965, the State Legislature passed a bill to replace the school with a new post-secondary school. The college opened as the University of Nebraska Technical School of Agriculture at Curtis, and the previous school was dissolved in 1968.

In 1985, during the 1980s farm crisis, the State Legislature announced plans to close the college. The college was intended to close in 1988. In 1987, then-governor Kay A. Orr vetoed the financial appropriation necessary to keep the college open. However, after visiting the campus, she was able to allocate enough money to allow the school to stay open until at least two more years. In 1989, the college rebranded to the Nebraska College of Technical Agriculture. By 1994, the college went on a financial upswing.

== Academics ==
Undergraduate demographics as of 2025
Race and ethnicity	Total
White	91%
Hispanic	6%
Two or more races	1%
Unknown	1%
Economic diversity
Low-income (Note: The percentage of students who received an income-based federal Pell grant intended for low-income students.)	42%
Affluent (Note: The percentage of students who are a part of the American middle class at the bare minimum.)	58%

The Nebraska College of Technical Agriculture is a public technical college. As of 2025, the college has 220 students. The college has six Fields of Study. Students at the college may seek A.A.S. degree, A.S. degrees, or certificates in agribusiness management, agriculture production systems or veterinary technology.

== Campus and athletics ==
NCTA and its earlier institutions have continually operated with business offices and the administration located in the first building on campus, Agriculture Hall at 404 East 7th Street, Curtis. NCTA is not a member of any athletic conference or association but fields a limited number of mixed-gender teams in dog, horse, and shooting sports.
