= Morton Township, Nebraska =

Morton Township, Nebraska may refer to the following places:

- Morton Township, Boyd County, Nebraska
- Morton Township, Knox County, Nebraska

== See also ==
- Morton Township (disambiguation)
