= Butte Township, Boyd County, Nebraska =

Butte Township
- Township
- Location in Boyd County
- Coordinates: 42°54′38″N 098°49′51″W
- Country: United States
- State: Nebraska
- County: Boyd

Area
  - Total: 63.76 sq mi (165.13 km^{2})
  - Land: 63.70 sq mi (164.98 km^{2})
  - Water: 0.058 sq mi (0.15 km^{2}) 0.09%
- Elevation: 1,770 ft (540 m)

Population (2020)
  - Total: 393
  - Density: 6.17/sq mi (2.38/km^{2})
- GNIS feature ID: 0837901

Butte Township is one of nine townships in Boyd County, Nebraska, United States. The population is 393 per the 2020 census, down from 484 per the 2010 census. A 2022 population estimate places the population at 376.

The villages of Anoka and Butte lie within the Township.

== See also ==
- County government in Nebraska
