= Rochefourchat =

- Commune
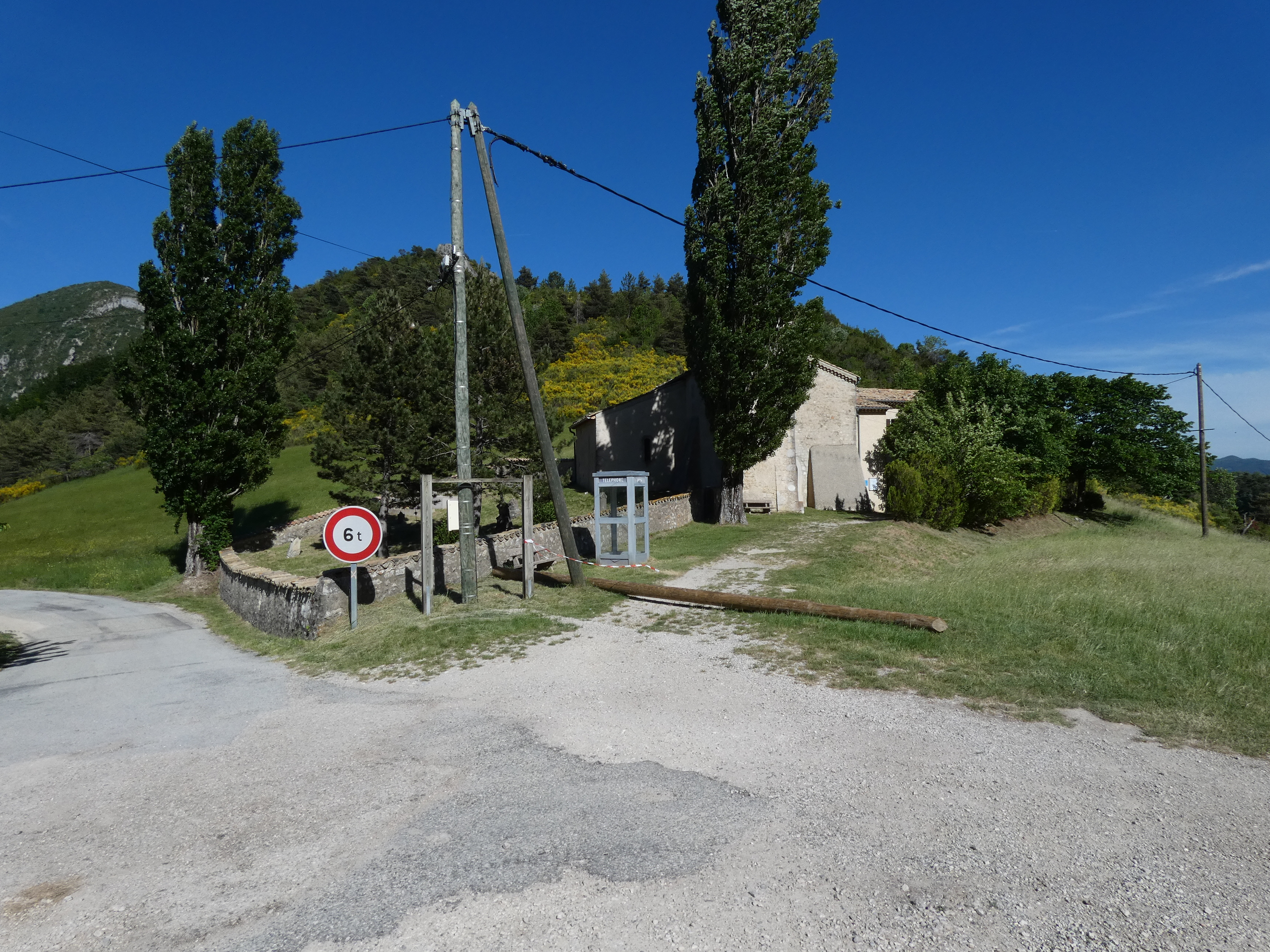
- The village of Rochefourchat.
- Location of Rochefourchat
- Location within France Location within Auvergne-Rhône-Alpes
- Coordinates: 44°35′58″N 5°14′53″E
- Country: France
- Region: Auvergne-Rhône-Alpes
- Department: Drôme
- Arrondissement: Die
- Canton: Le Diois
- Intercommunality: Diois

Government
  - Mayor (2020–2026): Jean-Baptiste Le Moyne de Martigny
- Area^{1}: 12.74 km^{2} (4.92 sq mi)
- Elevation: 963 m (3,159 ft)
- Highest elevation: 1,513 m (4,964 ft)
- Lowest elevation: 600 m (2,000 ft)
- Population (2023): 2
  - Density: 0.16/km^{2} (0.41/sq mi)
- Time zone: UTC+01:00 (CET)
  - Summer (DST): UTC+02:00 (CEST)
- INSEE/Postal code: 26274 /26340
- ^{1} French Land Register data, which excludes lakes, ponds, glaciers > 1 km^{2} (0.386 sq mi or 247 acres) and river estuaries.

Rochefourchat (French pronunciation: [ʁɔʃfuʁʃa]; Vivaro-Alpine: Ròchaforchaa) is a commune in the Drôme department, in the Auvergne-Rhône-Alpes region, southeastern France. In the commune, there is a single house, the St. Pierre's Church, a converted barn, and the ruins of an old castle. The commune is bordered by four other communes, and nearest to Rochefourchat are Saint-Nazaire-le-Désert, Les Tonils, Pradelle, and Brette.

== History ==
In 1178, the castle of Rocha Forcha was built by the bishops of Die as a stronghold against the Holy Roman Emperors. It belonged to French lords until the year 1766 when the last one, Lord Rey de Noinville, died. In 1796, a French trader, Pierre Jossaud bought the land surrounding the castle and renamed it Rochefourchat. The commune has been passed down through Jossaud's family.

== Population ==
Historical population
Year	Pop.	±% p.a.
1968	6	—
1975	2	−14.52%
1982	3	+5.96%
1990	2	−4.94%
1999	1	−7.41%
2007	1	+0.00%
2012	1	+0.00%
2017	1	+0.00%
2023	2	+12.25%
Source: INSEE

The permanent population of Rochefourchat consists of two people; yet Rochefourchat is not the least populous French commune, as there are six communes with no inhabitants, destroyed and abandoned during World War I but maintained as administrative subdivisions to preserve their memory.

== See also ==
- Communes of the Drôme department
- Monowi, a village consisting of one resident
