= Bristow Township, Boyd County, Nebraska =

Bristow Township
- Township
- Location in Boyd County
- Coordinates: 42°50′03″N 098°35′43″W
- Country: United States
- State: Nebraska
- County: Boyd

Area
  - Total: 33.4 sq mi (86.5 km^{2})
  - Land: 32.97 sq mi (85.39 km^{2})
  - Water: 0.43 sq mi (1.11 km^{2}) 1.28%
- Elevation: 1,585 ft (483 m)

Population (2020)
  - Total: 107
  - Density: 3.25/sq mi (1.25/km^{2})
- GNIS feature ID: 0837892

Bristow Township is one of nine townships in Boyd County, Nebraska, United States. The population was 107 at the 2020 census. A 2022 estimate placed the township's population at 103.

The Village of Bristow lies within the Township.
