= Spencer Township, Boyd County, Nebraska =

Spencer Township
- Township
- Location in Boyd County
- Coordinates: 42°54′18″N 098°43′10″W
- Country: United States
- State: Nebraska
- County: Boyd

Area
  - Total: 74.10 sq mi (191.92 km^{2})
  - Land: 73.91 sq mi (191.42 km^{2})
  - Water: 0.19 sq mi (0.5 km^{2}) 0.26%
- Elevation: 1,562 ft (476 m)

Population (2020)
  - Total: 553
  - Density: 10/sq mi (4/km^{2})
- ZIP code: 68777
- Area codes: 402 and 531
- GNIS feature ID: 0838264

Spencer Township is one of nine townships in Boyd County, Nebraska, United States. The population was 553 at the 2020 census.

The village of Spencer lies within the township.

== See also ==
- County government in Nebraska
