= Basin Township, Boyd County, Nebraska =

Basin Township
- Township
- Location in Boyd County
- Coordinates: 42°54′53″N 099°09′07″W
- Country: United States
- State: Nebraska
- County: Boyd

Area
  - Total: 128.78 sq mi (333.53 km^{2})
  - Land: 128.7 sq mi (333.4 km^{2})
  - Water: 0.050 sq mi (0.13 km^{2}) 0.04%
- Elevation: 1,719 ft (524 m)

Population (2020)
  - Total: 222
  - Density: 1.72/sq mi (0.666/km^{2})
- GNIS feature ID: 0837867

Basin Township is one of nine townships in Boyd County, Nebraska, United States. The population was 222 at the 2020 census, down from 228 at the 2010 census. The 2022 population estimate is 213. The Village of Naper lies within the Township.

== See also ==
- County government in Nebraska
