= Bush Township, Boyd County, Nebraska =

Bush Township
- Township
- Location in Boyd County
- Coordinates: 42°50′26″N 098°22′17″W
- Country: United States
- State: Nebraska
- County: Boyd

Area
  - Total: 57.24 sq mi (148.24 km^{2})
  - Land: 55.24 sq mi (143.08 km^{2})
  - Water: 1.99 sq mi (5.16 km^{2}) 3.48%
- Elevation: 1,447 ft (441 m)

Population (2020)
  - Total: 72
  - Density: 1.3/sq mi (0.50/km^{2})
- ZIP code: 68746
- Area codes: 402 and 531
- GNIS feature ID: 0837899

Bush Township is one of nine townships in Boyd County, Nebraska, United States. The Township was named for George H. W. Bush, 41st President of the United States. The population was 72 at the 2020 census. A 2022 estimate placed the township's population at 68.

The Village of Monowi lies within the Township.

== See also ==
- County government in Nebraska
