= Low-level radioactive waste policy of the United States =

Radioactive waste is generated from the nuclear weapons program, commercial nuclear power, medical applications, and corporate and university-based research programs. Waste is generally categorized as high level waste (HLW) and low-level waste (LLW). LLW contains materials such as irradiated tools, lab clothing, ion exchanger resins, animal carcasses, and trash from defense, commercial nuclear power, medical, and research activities. These materials usually have radioactivity that have short half lives—from ranges of multiple days to several hundred years. In 1990, 1.1 million cubic feet of LLW was produced. By 2011, U.S. reactors generated about 40,000 cubic meters of low-level radioactive waste per year, including contaminated components and materials resulting from reactor decommissioning.

== Classes of low level waste ==
The U.S. Nuclear Regulatory Commission (NRC) has LLW broken into three different classes: A, B, and C. These classes are based on the wastes' concentration, half-life, as well as what types of radionuclides it contains. Class A consists of radionuclides with the shortest half-life and lowest concentrations. This class makes up 95% of LLW and its radioactivity levels return to background levels within 100 years. Classes B and C contain greater concentrations of radionuclides with longer half-lives, fading to background levels in less than 500 years. They must meet stricter disposal requirements than Class A waste. Any LLW that exceeds the requirements for class C waste is known as “Greater Than Class C”; this material makes up less than 1 percent of all LLW and is the responsibility of the United States Department of Energy under federal law.

== History of low level waste disposal ==
The dispersion or elimination of LLW has varied throughout history. During the 1940s and early 1950s LLW was dumped in the oceans or buried into shallow unlined landfills. Throughout history, the U.S. has dealt with complex policy adjustments pertaining to nuclear waste management.

In 1979 there were only three commercial disposal facilities remaining in operation, with only one of them, the site in South Carolina, located east of the Rocky Mountains. Due to the concentration of nuclear technology and waste products in the East, South Carolina was receiving 80-90 percent of monthly volume of LLW generated commercially in the United States. In the same year, the governors of the states of South Carolina, Nevada, and Washington testified before a subcommittee of the United States Congress, arguing that they could no longer bear the national responsibility for LLW disposal. The governors proposed that Congress establish a national policy governing the disposal of LLW based on two principles: (1) that each state was to be responsible for ensuring burial capacity for the LLW generated within its borders, and (2) that the several states would be encouraged to carry out this responsibility on a regional basis using interstate compacts.

== Low level radioactive waste policy ==
The national policy approach proposed by the three governors in 1979 was later endorsed by the President's State Planning Council on Radioactive Waste Management, the National Governors' Association, and the National Conference of State Legislatures. In giving their endorsement, these groups expanded the initial proposal to incorporate three principles: (1) state responsibility for providing LLW disposal capacity; (2) encouragement of interstate compacts for the exercise of this responsibility; and (3) the right of regional compacts to prohibit disposal at their regional facilities of LLW generated in non-compact states.

=== Low Level Radioactive Waste Policy Act of 1980 ===
In response to the complex disposal issue, Congress passed the Low Level Radioactive Waste Policy Act of 1980 (P.L. 96-573), which established that each state was responsible for disposing LLRW generated within its boundaries. Congress asserted that LLRW could be most safely and efficiently managed on a regional basis. The Act goes on to say that the states may enter into compacts with their neighbors under Congressional authorization. The law called for the ability of compacts to exclude wastes from other regions after January 1, 1986. The legislation led to the formation of a number of compacts, including the Appalachian, Central Midwest, Central States, Midwest, Northeast, Northwest, Rocky Mountain, Southeast, and Western. Certain states, notably California and Texas, chose to remain independent at the time. Compacts are responsible for deciding what facilities are needed and which state will serve as host and or how long.

=== Low Level Radioactive Waste Policy Amendments Act of 1985 ===
It was anticipated that the 1980 Act would resolve the disposal issue, several complications prevented the Act's effectiveness. Negotiations among states to form compacts and start developing disposal sites took longer than expected, making it impossible to meet the 1986 deadline. State compacts planned to begin excluding out-of-compact waste as soon as Congress approved their charters. However, congressional approval was stalled by powerful states outside of the seven regions that were prepared to prevent congressional approval of the compact charters. As a result, compact states did not obtain the authority to exclude, or discriminate against, out of region waste.

Nevada, Washington, and South Carolina threatened to close their sites unless Congress acted to give them greater control. To relieve this problem and at the same time to accelerate action, Congress passed the Low Level Radioactive Waste Policy Amendments Act of 1985 (P.L. 99-240). The Low Level Radioactive Waste Policy Amendments Act (LLRWPAA) extended the operation of the three existing disposal sites to December 31, 1992. After that time the three sites could close or exclude waste from outside the compacts in which they were located. The Amendments Act also set up strong incentives to encourage states without sites for disposal facilities to site, license, and construct facilities. Compacts and states without sites when the 1985 Amendments Act was passed faced rising disposal charges for using existing disposal facilities. They also had to meet specific milestones in order to maintain access to the present facilities. Milestones included deadlines on ratifying compacts, selecting host states, developing plans, submitting license applications, and providing disposal. Existing disposal sites are allowed to impose surcharges for disposal of wastes from regions without sites, with rebates to be used by states or compacts for site development. The U.S. Department of Energy (DOE) keeps track of these arrangements, with authority to assign additional emergency disposal capacity to reactors, while the NRC can authorize emergency access to existing sites. Both agencies are active in providing information and guidance.

=== Omnibus Low Level Radioactive Waste Interstate Compact Consent Act (Consent Act) ===
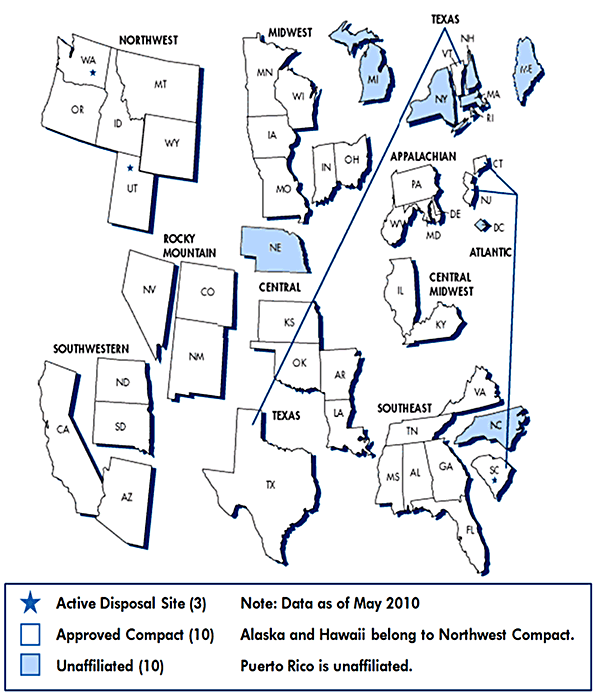
Current Interstate Compacts

The Consent Act (P. L. 99-240, title II, 99 Stat. 1871) of 1986 granted congressional consent to all of the compacts that had been ratified by the states up to that point. Implicit in the congressional consent to this compact is the expectation by Congress and the party states that the appropriate federal agencies will actively assist the Compact Commission and the individual party states to this compact by:

1. Expeditious enforcement of federal rules, regulations and laws;
2. Imposing sanctions against those found to be in violation of federal rules, regulations and laws;
3. Timely inspection of their licensees to determine their capability to adhere to such rules, regulations and laws;
4. Timely provision of technical assistance to this compact in carrying out their obligations under the LLRWPAA.

== Controversies ==
The LLRWAA contained both positive and negative incentives. The positive incentive was a provision that allowed compacts to restrict access to their regional LLW disposal facility to member states beginning in 1993, thus limiting the amount of waste disposed of in any state hosting a regional disposal facility. The negative incentive required states that failed to provide access to LLW disposal facilities to take title and possession of wastes generated within their borders—the so-called “Take Title” provision. In 1992, in a lawsuit brought by New York State, the U.S. Supreme Court struck down the “Take Title” provision thus removing a major incentive for states to develop new disposal facilities.

=== New York vs. United States ===
New York attempted to negotiate a regional compact with neighboring states in the northeast, but most of the states were alarmed by the volume of LLWs that New York produced. After 55 sites were examined in ten different geographic areas, public protests, demonstrations and civil disobedience from NIMBY members led the governor of New York to suspend further investigation for siting the LLW facility. The state of New York and two counties (Allegany and Cortland) filed a lawsuit against the LLW Policy Act in result of its inconsistency with the Tenth Amendment and the guarantee clause. Including New York and the support of the two counties, seventeen states also joined New York as amici. The three states with the original LLW joined the defendants. The petitioners engaged three sets of incentives made to persuade states in following the LLW Policy Act Amendments. Each involved the responsibility for LLW that is generated within each states borders. They stated that the act and incentives “commandeers the legislative process of the states,” by directly compelling the states to enforce a federal mandate involving the disposal of LLW. Referring to Philadelphia v New Jersey, where the Supreme Court decided a state can not discriminate against another states waste in accepting shipments at an operating disposal site, the majority held the regulation of LLW disposal is within the congress clause authority. After many reviews of the provisions, the third “take title” incentive was found to present states with two unconstitutional alternatives: accepting the “responsibility and ownership of the waste, or regulate according to Congress' instruction”. Therefore, the take title provision was severed from the LLW policy act, leaving the remaining two provisions.

=== Alabama v. North Carolina ===
After the Low Level Radioactive Waste Policy Act of 1980 was passed, a number of interstate compacts were formed to collectively dispose of LLRW. These included the Southeast Interstate Low-Level Radioactive Waste Management Compact. Following a dispute over North Carolina's duties to host a disposal facility, the other states in the Compact filed a lawsuit against North Carolina.

=== Entergy Arkansas US v. Nebraska ===
The Central Interstate Low-Level Radioactive Waste Compact designated Nebraska to be the host state for the Compact's disposal site. In Entergy Arkansas US v. Nebraska, Nebraska was found liable for damages resulting from failure to meet its obligations under the Compact by licensing a disposal site. In 2005, Nebraska paid over $145 million in damages to the Central Interstate Low-Level Radioactive Waste Commission, which then distributed the funds to member states affiliated corporations. The controversy is discussed in the book Nuclear Nebraska.

== Current low level radioactive waste regulation ==
Currently the Nuclear Regulatory Commission regulations are found in the Code of Federal Regulations (CFR) under “Energy,” in Chapter I of Title 10. Chapter I is divided into 199 different parts, while only parts 61 and 62 are the principal portions of low-level radioactive waste regulations. Part 61 describes the licensing requirements for land disposal of radioactive waste. This portion also includes the current regulation of unique waste streams, and possible draft revised portions of part 61. This is in result of the date at which the content was written. When this part was initially developed, there were not facilities generating a large amount of depleted uranium waste streams. Part 62 involves the criteria and procedures for emergency access to non-federal and regional low-level waste disposal facilities. Each agreement States' regulations must always be compatible with the Nuclear Regulatory Commission's, this gives the states a tiny bit of flexibility of creating a procedure as long as it follows NRC's regulations. Due to the constant variation in the fine line policy work of disposing nuclear waste, the NRC produces a semiannual agenda that provides descriptions of the rule making actions to the most recent date benchmark date. In September 2014, Michigan drafted a bill that would regulate the amount of low-level radioactive material from often more fracking-intensive states.

=== Low level radioactive waste oversight ===
With so many safety policies in place, regular observation of the LLRW facilities is completely necessary. The four disposal sites in the United States at Utah, South Carolina, Washington State, and Texas are each regulated by Agreement States. Each State involved has developed an oversight program that requires periodic inspections of the facilities. These inspectors make sure that each incoming shipment is properly document and analyzed for their radioactive material content. The radiation safety and waste disposal requirements of the staff and facility is also observed to ensure the licensees are properly managing the facility.

== Agreement state program ==
The NRC has entered into agreements with 37 states, called Agreement States, to allow these states to regulate the management, storage and disposal of certain nuclear waste. Section 274 of the amended Atomic Energy Act of 1954 (P.L. 83-703 Sec. 3113) provides a legislative basis under which the NRC gives up portions of its regulatory authority to license and regulate certain quantities on LLRW to the States. The method used to transfer the NRC's authority to a State is an agreement signed by the Governor of the State and the Chairman of the commission, in accordance with section 274b of the Atomic Energy Act. Agreement States issue radioactive material licenses, promulgate regulations, and enforce those regulations under the authority of each individual state's laws. The Agreement States exercise their licensing and enforcement actions under direction of the governors in a manner that is compatible with the licensing and enforcement programs of the NRC.

NRC assistance to States entering into Agreements includes review of requests from States for 274b Agreements, or amendments to existing agreements, meetings with States to discuss and resolve NRC review comments, and recommendations for Commission approval of proposed 274b agreements. Additionally, NRC conducts training courses and workshops; evaluates technical licensing and inspection issues from Agreement States; evaluates State rule changes; participates in activities conducted by the Conference of Radiation Control Program Directors, Inc.; and provides early and substantive involvement of the States in NRC rule making and other regulatory efforts. The NRC also coordinates the reporting of event information with Agreement States and responds to claims reported to NRC involving Agreement States.

On March 26, 1962, the Commonwealth of Kentucky became the first Agreement State. An overview of the process to become an Agreement State includes the following:

- Governor files Letter of Intent with Chairman
- Federal and State Materials and Environmental Management Program (FSME) assigns a Project Manager
- State develops Draft Request
- NRC staff reviews Draft Request for completeness
- State develops Formal Request
- A Complete Request includes supporting State legislation, regulations, and program description
- Governor submits Formal Request and certifies State has adequate program
- NRC staff evaluates request against 1981 and 1983 Criteria for Agreements
- Commission approves publication in the Federal Register for public review and comment
- NRC staff analyzes public comments
- Commission approves Agreement
- Chairman and Governor hold signing ceremony
- State assumes regulation authority
- NRC staff and the State continue post-Agreement exchange of information and assessment of program performance.

=== Organization of Agreement States ===
The Organization of Agreement States (OAS) is a nonprofit, voluntary, scientific and professional society within the District of Columbia. The membership of OAS consists of state radiation control directors and staff from the 37 Agreement States who are responsible for implementation of their respective Agreement State programs. The purpose of the OAS is to provide a mechanism for these Agreement States to work with each other and with the United States Nuclear Regulatory Commission (NRC) on regulatory issues associated with their individual agreements.

== Transportation ==
The transport of LLW is regulated by two United States government agencies. The first is the United States Department of Transportation (USDOT) under the 1974 Transportation Safety Act (H.R. 15223), and second, the NRC under authority of the Atomic Energy Act of 1954 (42 U.S.C. § 2011) and the Energy Reorganization Act of 1974. The USDOT has regulations for: container safety, labeling, routing, and emergency response for the transportation of radioactive waste, including LLW.

=== Container safety ===
Any material with a very low radiation level may be transported in a “strong, tight container such as a plywood box secured with steel bands”. Materials with higher radiation levels are to be transported in Type A or Type B containers. Type A containers are usually either steel drums or steel boxes, while Type B are heavily engineered metal casks. The testing of these containers is completed by the NRC and simulate normal, rough, and severe accident conditions. Some of the testing procedures that are completed are a water spray to simulate a severe rainstorm and also dropping the container from different heights. Type B containers require more rigorous testing procedures because Type B containers carry materials with higher radioactivity levels; Type B containers must not only meet the requirements set by the USDOT, but also those set by the NRC. LLW is usually transported in Type A containers.

=== Labeling ===
The USDOT has a labeling system in place for the transportation of LLW. There are three kinds of labels: I (white), II (yellow with black lettering), and III (yellow with red letters). This numbering system is used to provide precaution levels, the higher the number the higher the risk. Labels are also placed on the outside of the truck carrying the materials depending on the type of package being carried.

=== Routing ===
The routing of the LLW is regulated by both USDOT and NRC and must meet the following requirements:

- motor vehicles must travel on routes that minimize radiological risk;
- available information on accident rates, transit time, population density and activities, and the time of day and day of week are used to determine the level of radiological risk;
- the route is specified and the vehicle operator must have had formal training as part of the shipping company's radiation protection program, whose quality and adequacy have been evaluated by NRC and DOT;
- an Interstate Highway System bypass or beltway around a city must be used when available.

=== Safety procedures ===
All parties involved in the transportation of LLW must maintain the following information: descriptions of the radioactive material, any special health concerns, and procedures to be used during an emergency. Those responsible for the generation of the waste must also maintain a 24-hour emergency telephone number monitored by qualified emergency response personnel. Those responsible of the actual transport of the material must also train employees on how to respond if a spill or accident were to occur. In order to enforce regulations for LLW the USDOT has an audit program. Any company that transports LLW is given a safety rating based on: inspection results, accident record, and the size and number of vehicles; this safety rating is then used to prioritize audits of the companies. Some states allow the NRC to complete inspections under USDOT regulations.

=== Accidents ===
There are approximately 11,000 shipments of LLW annually in the United States. A study completed by the USDOT showed there were only 53 accidents from 1971 to 1991 that involved LLW in the United States; it was only in four of these accidents that the container was breached and material was released. However, in each case the accidents were cleaned up quickly and there was not an increase in background levels at the site of the accident. There are currently no radiological related injuries or deaths that have occurred from exposure to LLW transportation accidents.

The response to a transportation accident, as well as the remediation of the spill, is the responsibility of the shipper. If a transportation accident occurs with "significant package deterioration" the NRC must be notified. If an accident causes injury, hospitalization, or death the National Response Center must also be notified.

== Disposal facilities ==
Every state in the United States is responsible for providing disposal for any of the LLW that is generated within its borders. There are three options for the disposal of such waste: in-state disposal, joining with other states to form a compact, or by contracting with a state or compact that has a disposal facility. Requirements for LLW disposal sites have been established by the NRC and use a series of natural and engineered barriers to prevent any radioactive waste from escaping into the environment. Currently, the United States has four low-level waste disposal facilities that accept various levels of LLW, all are located in agreement states.

=== Barnwell, South Carolina ===
The first is located in Barnwell, South Carolina, and is licensed by the state of South Carolina. They accept Class A, B, and C waste from within its borders as well as from Connecticut and New Jersey.

=== Richland, Washington ===
The second facility is located in Richland, Washington, and is licensed by the state of Washington. They also accept Class A, B, and C waste and receive waste from states in the Northwest Compact and the Rocky Mountain Compact states. The Northwest Compact states are Washington, Alaska, Hawaii, Idaho, Montana, Oregon, and Wyoming. The Rocky Mountain Compact states are Colorado, Nevada, and New Mexico.

=== Clive, Utah ===
The third facility is located in Clive, Utah, and is licensed by the state of Utah. It accepts waste from all regions of the United States, but only accepts Class A waste.

=== Andrews County, Texas ===
There is one facility in Andrews County, Texas, that has been licensed and operational. The operator of the facility, Waste Control Specialists LLC, was issued a license in September 2009 by the Texas Commission on Environmental Quality and construction was completed and the site became operational in November 2011. The site is authorized to accept Class A, B, and C waste from the federal government, Texas, Vermont, and the any other states, if first approved by the Texas Compact Commission.

== Resources ==
Low-Level Radioactive Waste Forum, Inc., an independent nonprofit representing the compacts and the states.
