= McCulley Township =

McCulley Township may refer to one of the following places within the United States:

- McCulley Township, Boyd County, Nebraska
- McCulley Township, Emmons County, North Dakota
