= Elsie Eiler =

Only resident of Monowi, Nebraska

Mayor of Monowi, Nebraska
- Incumbent
- Assumed office 2004
- Preceded by: Rudy Eiler

Personal details
- Born: October 11, 1933 (age 93) Holt County, Nebraska, U.S.

Elsie Piklapp Eiler (born October 11, 1933) is an American woman who is the mayor of Monowi, Nebraska. As the sole resident, she runs the town's library, postal service, and its only business: the local tavern. As mayor, she writes the permits for her tavern's liquor license and files the town taxes for herself. Born in Monowi at a time when the population was around 100 people, Eiler grew up in the town and met her husband, Rudy. They later purchased the local tavern in the 1970s and Eiler was made the town secretary and treasurer.

The Eilers had become the sole residents by 2000. In 2004, after Rudy died, Eiler opened a library in his name. Her single residency and this public library opening received national attention and she was interviewed by a wide range of media personalities. She has continued running the Monowi tavern and library in the years since.

== Life and career ==
Eiler was born as Elsie Marie Piklapp on October 11, 1933 in Holt County, Nebraska, to Elsie and Michael Piklapp. Her mother was also born in Nebraska and her father was an immigrant from Germany. Eiler spent her childhood on her parents' farm just north of Monowi. She met her future husband, Rudy, in elementary school. Eiler received her driver's license at the age of 9. She attended Lynch High School in nearby Lynch, Nebraska, graduating in 1951. Rudy left for three years to join the United States Air Force and was stationed in France.

During this period, Eiler and a friend traveled to Kansas City to attend flight attendant school. She then worked in Austin, Texas and Dallas, Texas as an airline reservations agent. After returning, the Eilers stayed in Omaha, Nebraska for a period of six months while Rudy finished his military requirements, during which time they married. In 1971 they purchased the Monowi tavern, officially reopening it in 1975. By 1979, Eiler had become both the town's secretary and treasurer, with the population having dwindled to 16 residents. Eiler and her husband had become the only residents of the town by 2000, with Rudy acting as mayor.

The Monowi library holds a large book collection which belonged to Rudy. Prior to his death, the Eiler family set about fulfilling his dream of owning a public library, with help from their son Jack. After Rudy died, and as newly-established mayor and sole resident, Elsie Eiler officially opened Rudy's Library in the summer of 2004. Housing over 4,000 volumes, it is frequently visited by friends and neighbors in towns surrounding Monowi. The library's opening saw national news coverage, with multiple morning programs such as CBS News Sunday Morning visiting to interview Eiler and Larry The Cable Guy hosting a comedy performance. Eiler turned down any interviews that would require her to leave the town, deciding not to appear on The Tonight Show with Jay Leno, The Rosie O'Donnell Show, or The Ellen DeGeneres Show.

During his production of Lillian in 2016, filmmaker Andreas Horvath visited Monowi to meet Eiler. She closed the tavern's dining room during the COVID-19 pandemic, per state regulations, but continued selling alcohol and food through a to-go service. This caused a significant increase in business, in addition to the 2019 Midwestern U.S. floods affecting the region the prior year that had resulted in the tavern being one of the few unaffected restaurants in the surrounding area. In 2005, then-student journalist at the University of Nebraska–Lincoln Alyssa Schukar began a photo history and collage of Eiler. This photo essay was continued in the following seventeen years, and was published in 2022 in The New York Times.

== Personal life ==
Eiler has two sisters, Marjorie and Phyllis, and two brothers, Marvin and Dwayne. She married Ronnie "Rudy" Eiler on June 28, 1954 in Lynch, Nebraska. They had a son and daughter together. Rudy died in January 2004 from lung cancer. Eiler was diagnosed with colon cancer in 2011 and underwent chemotherapy.
