= Morton Township =

Morton Township may refer to:

- Morton Township, Tazewell County, Illinois
- Morton Township, Page County, Iowa
- Morton Township, Ottawa County, Kansas, in Ottawa County, Kansas
- Morton Township, Pawnee County, Kansas, in Pawnee County, Kansas
- Morton Township, Sedgwick County, Kansas
- Morton Township, Michigan
- Morton Township, Boyd County, Nebraska
- Morton Township, Knox County, Nebraska
- Morton Township, Burleigh County, North Dakota, in Burleigh County, North Dakota
- Morton Township, Day County, South Dakota, in Day County, South Dakota
