= Lynch Township, Boyd County, Nebraska =

Lynch Township
- Township
- Location in Boyd County
- Coordinates: 42°49′34″N 098°28′52″W
- Country: United States
- State: Nebraska
- County: Boyd

Area
  - Total: 41.33 sq mi (107.05 km^{2})
  - Land: 40.70 sq mi (105.42 km^{2})
  - Water: 0.63 sq mi (1.63 km^{2}) 1.52%
- Elevation: 1,417 ft (432 m)

Population (2020)
  - Total: 237
  - Density: 8.0/sq mi (3.1/km^{2})
- ZIP code: 68746
- Area codes: 402 and 531
- GNIS feature ID: 0838119

Lynch Township is one of nine townships in Boyd County, Nebraska, United States. The population was 237 at the 2020 census.

The Village of Lynch lies within the Township.

== See also ==
- County government in Nebraska
