= Mankato (disambiguation) =

Mankato may refer to:

- Mankato, Minnesota
  - Minnesota State University, Mankato
- North Mankato, Minnesota
- Mankato, Kansas
- Mankato, Nebraska
- Mankato (Mdewakanton)
