= Central Interstate Low-Level Radioactive Waste Compact =

The Central Interstate Low Level Radioactive Waste Compact was originally made up of the states of Arkansas, Kansas, Louisiana, Nebraska, and Oklahoma. The interstate compact, a policy instrument that features heavily in U.S. low-level radioactive waste policy, was approved by Congress as part of the Low-Level Radioactive Waste Policy Amendments of 1985. The Central Interstate Low-Level Radioactive Waste Compact Commission was created in 1984 to administer the Compact.

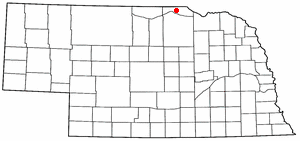
Map of Nebraska showing the location of Butte in Boyd County

In June 1987, US Ecology, a subsidiary of American Ecology Corporation, was chosen to manage site selection and development. US Ecology recommended Nebraska as the state to host its disposal site, and the Commission voted to approve that choice. From the 21 counties and 54 communities that expressed interest in hosting the site, US Ecology narrowed the selection to three candidate sites announced in January 1989: Boyd, Nemaha, and Nuckolls counties. Although considerable local opposition to the site had been expressed during the community consultation process, US Ecology announced the selection of a site in Butte, Boyd County in February, 1990 and began what would be a long process of site licensing and review.

As chronicled in the book Nuclear Nebraska, citizens and factions throughout Boyd County, where Butte is located, fought for over 15 years over the placement of a disposal site in this area. Nebraska Governor Kay Orr had advocated for the site, but in 1990, Governor Ben Nelson was elected as a strong opponent of it.

During this time frame, opposition was intense and involved threats of violence toward the Commission and others involved in the process. Commission Chairman Ray Peery received frequent threatening telephone calls, and the Commission canceled a planned site tour in October 1991 due to safety concerns.

In January 1992, Peery was convicted of theft and money laundering, further undermining the Commission's credibility.

Between 1994 and 1998, as a series of lawsuits and opposition in the Nebraska state government brought progress to a halt, the Commission's director frequently had to address rumors that his organization no longer existed.

On December 30, 1998, the power companies who were the major generators of low-level radioactive waste in the region filed a lawsuit against the State of Nebraska, its agents, and the Commission. Within a month, the Commission had realigned its role in the lawsuit from defendant to plaintiff. The lawsuit claimed damages due to bad faith by state regulators in the license review process.

In 1999, the state of Nebraska voted to withdraw from the Compact.

The suit was first tried in the United States District Court for the District of Nebraska. In his 2002 decision against the state of Nebraska, Judge Richard Kopf held that Nebraska had "effectively withdrawn" from the Compact by that time. However, based on the terms of the Compact, this withdrawal was not official until 2004.

When the Eighth District Court of Appeals affirmed Kopf's decision in 2004, Nebraska was found liable for damages for failure to fulfill its obligations under the Compact. On August 1, 2005, the State of Nebraska paid over $145 million to the Commission. The settlement funds were then distributed to the remaining member states, power companies, and US Ecology.

In 2005, the Commission determined that there was no need to develop a disposal site in the Compact states at this time. Between 2005 and 2017, member states applied to the Commission for authorization to dispose of low-level radioactive waste at other facilities; in 2017, the Commission ended this authorization requirement. As of 2025, the Compact is still in force.

The Boyd County land was given to the Village of Butte in 2006.
