= Bristow, Nebraska =

Village in Nebraska, US

- Village
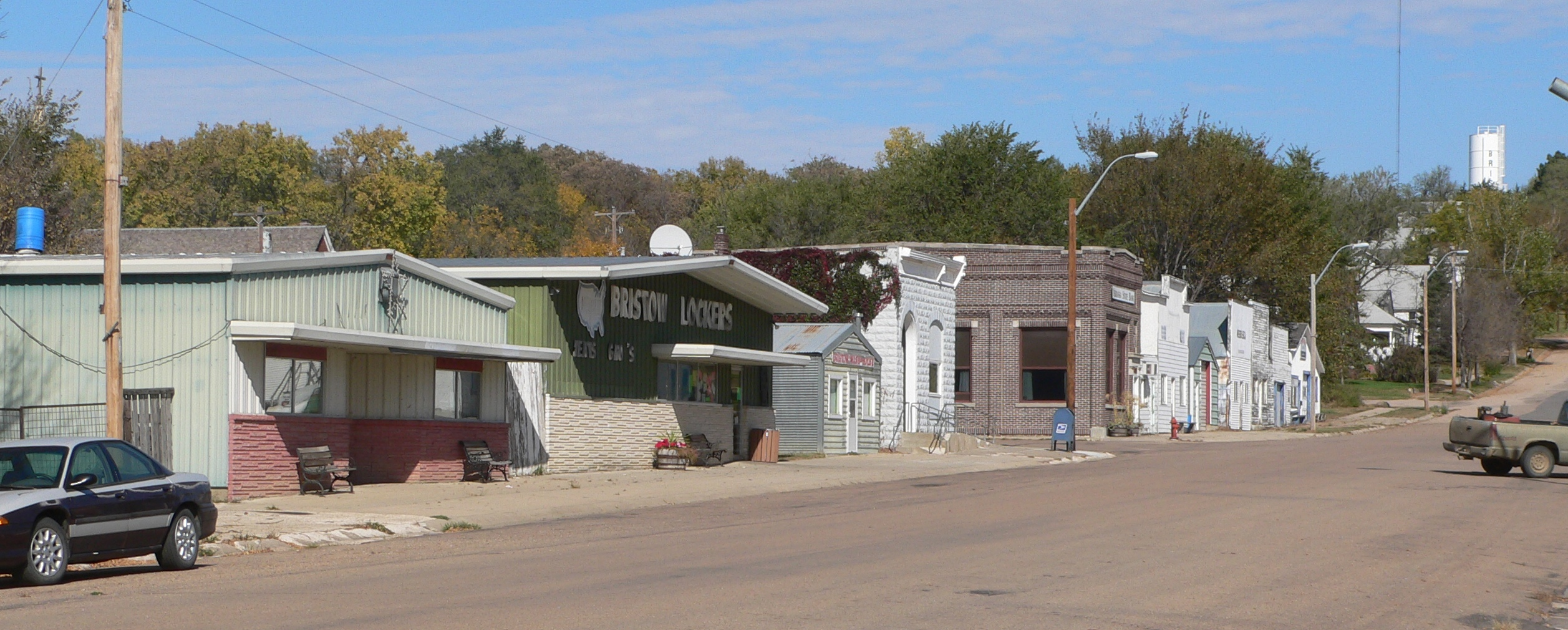
- Downtown Bristow: Prairie Street

- Location of Bristow, Nebraska
- Coordinates: 42°50′27″N 98°35′00″W
- Country: United States
- State: Nebraska
- County: Boyd

Area
  - Total: 0.16 sq mi (0.42 km^{2})
  - Land: 0.16 sq mi (0.42 km^{2})
  - Water: 0 sq mi (0.00 km^{2})
- Elevation: 1,467 ft (447 m)

Population (2020)
  - Total: 70
  - Density: 430.6/sq mi (166.26/km^{2})
- Time zone: UTC-6 (Central (CST))
  - Summer (DST): UTC-5 (CDT)
- ZIP code: 68719
- Area code: 402
- FIPS code: 31-06400
- GNIS feature ID: 2397457

Bristow is a village in Boyd County, Nebraska, United States. The population was 70 at the 2020 census, up from 65 in 2010.

== History ==
Bristow was laid out as a town in 1902 when the railroad was extended to that point. It was named for Benjamin Bristow, United States Secretary of the Treasury during the Presidency of Ulysses S. Grant.

== Geography ==
According to the United States Census Bureau, the village has a total area of 0.16 square miles (0.41 km^{2}), all land.

== Demographics ==
Historical population
Census	Pop.	Note	%±
1910	175		—
1920	255		45.7%
1930	183		−28.2%
1940	188		2.7%
1950	146		−22.3%
1960	153		4.8%
1970	127		−17.0%
1980	123		−3.1%
1990	107		−13.0%
2000	88		−17.8%
2010	65		−26.1%
2020	70		7.7%
U.S. Decennial Census

=== 2010 census ===
As of the census of 2010, there were 65 people, 37 households, and 19 families residing in the village. The population density was 406.3 inhabitants per square mile (156.9/km^{2}). There were 56 housing units at an average density of 350.0 per square mile (135.1/km^{2}). The racial makeup of the village was 100.0% White.

There were 37 households, of which 8.1% had children under the age of 18 living with them, 48.6% were married couples living together, 2.7% had a female householder with no husband present, and 48.6% were non-families. 45.9% of all households were made up of individuals, and 27% had someone living alone who was 65 years of age or older. The average household size was 1.76 and the average family size was 2.42.

The median age in the village was 63.5 years. 4.6% of residents were under the age of 18; 4.6% were between the ages of 18 and 24; 9.2% were from 25 to 44; 41.6% were from 45 to 64; and 40% were 65 years of age or older. The gender makeup of the village was 55.4% male and 44.6% female.

=== 2000 census ===
As of the census of 2000, there were 88 people, 40 households, and 26 families residing in the village. The population density was 506.4 inhabitants per square mile (195.5/km^{2}). There were 53 housing units at an average density of 305.0 per square mile (117.8/km^{2}). The racial makeup of the village was 95.45% White, 3.41% Native American, and 1.14% from two or more races.

There were 40 households, out of which 27.5% had children under the age of 18 living with them, 57.5% were married couples living together, 2.5% had a female householder with no husband present, and 35.0% were non-families. 35.0% of all households were made up of individuals, and 17.5% had someone living alone who was 65 years of age or older. The average household size was 2.20 and the average family size was 2.81.

In the village, the population was spread out, with 19.3% under the age of 18, 8.0% from 18 to 24, 20.5% from 25 to 44, 26.1% from 45 to 64, and 26.1% who were 65 years of age or older. The median age was 46 years. For every 100 females there were 131.6 males. For every 100 females age 18 and over, there were 129.0 males.

As of 2000, the median income for a household in the village was $28,125, and the median income for a family was $33,438. Males had a median income of $18,125 versus $16,250 for females. The per capita income for the village was $11,737. There were 7.4% of families and 10.1% of the population living below the poverty line, including 20.0% of under eighteens and 12.5% of those over 64.

== Education ==
The area is within Boyd County Public Schools. The area was previously within the Lynch Public Schools district in Lynch. The Lynch district consolidated into the Boyd County district in June 2017.
