= Rosedale, Nebraska =

Coordinates: 40°42′47″N 98°28′24″W

Rosedale is a ghost town in Boyd County, Nebraska, United States.

== History ==
The post office at Rosedale was established in 1898 and discontinued in 1903.
