= Baker, Nebraska =

- Ghost Town
- Location within Nebraska
- Coordinates: 42.98889°N 98.73092°W
- Country: United States
- State: Nebraska
- County: Boyd

Baker is a ghost town in Boyd County, Nebraska, United States.

== History ==
A post office was established at Baker in 1891, and remained in operation until it was discontinued in 1906. Baker was likely named for a pioneer settler.
