= Mullen Township, Boyd County, Nebraska =

Mullen Township
- Township
- Location in Boyd County
- Coordinates: 42°54′53″N 098°29′12″W
- Country: United States
- State: Nebraska
- County: Boyd

Area
  - Total: 40.46 sq mi (104.78 km^{2})
  - Land: 39.31 sq mi (101.82 km^{2})
  - Water: 1.14 sq mi (2.96 km^{2}) 2.82%
- Elevation: 1,710 ft (520 m)

Population (2020)
  - Total: 22
  - Density: 1.3/sq mi (0.5/km^{2})
- ZIP code: 68746
- Area codes: 402 and 531
- GNIS feature ID: 0838149

Mullen Township is one of nine townships in Boyd County, Nebraska, United States. The population was 22 at the 2020 census.

== See also ==
- County government in Nebraska
