= Lynch Public Schools =

School district in Nebraska, United States

Lynch Public Schools was a school district in Nebraska. Its sole school was Lynch Public School, a pre-K-12 institution located in Lynch. The district's territory included Lynch, Bristow, and Monowi. The Lynch district was consolidated into the Boyd County Public Schools district in June 2017, since enrollment in school area had decreased.

When it existed, typical enrollment consisted of approximately 30 students at the elementary level, 15 at the middle school level, and 25 at the high school level.
