= Doty, Nebraska =

- Ghost Town
- Country: United States
- State: Nebraska
- County: Boyd

Doty is a ghost town in Boyd County, Nebraska, United States.

== History ==
A post office was established at Doty in 1881, and remained in operation until it was discontinued in 1902.
