= Mankato, Nebraska =

Ghost town in Nebraska, United States

Mankato is a ghost town in Boyd County, Nebraska, United States.

== History ==
A post office was established at Mankato in 1890, and remained in operation until it was discontinued in 1901. It was likely named after Mankato, Minnesota.
