= Nuclear Nebraska =

2007 non-fiction book by Susan Cragin

- First edition cover
- Author: Susan Cragin
- Language: English
- Subject: Nuclear waste
- Genre: Non-fiction
- Publisher: American Management Association, New York
- Publication date: 2007
- Publication place: United States
- Media type: Print, e-book
- Pages: 271 pp.
- ISBN: 978-0-8144-7430-3
- OCLC: 86172845

Nuclear Nebraska: The Remarkable Story of the Little County That Couldn't Be Bought is a 2007 book by Susan Cragin which follows the controversy about a proposed low level nuclear waste dump, which was planned for Boyd County, Nebraska.

In 1989, two multinational corporations and several government agencies proposed a waste dump and offered payment of $3 million per year for 40 years. The residents of the Boyd County farming community resisted the offer and controversy followed for almost two decades. During this time, the community was transformed "from a small group of isolated farmers to a defiant band of environmentalists". The opposition of the community eventually succeeded, and the license to build the dump was denied.

Several governors became embroiled in the controversy, as well as legislators, bureaucrats and the community. One central figure went to jail and others were dismissed from their jobs. For many years, there was extensive coverage of the event by the news media.

U.S. Senator Ben Nelson wrote the foreword to the book.

== See also ==
- List of books about nuclear issues
- Central Interstate Low Level Radioactive Waste Compact
