= Naper, Nebraska =

Village in Nebraska, US

- Village
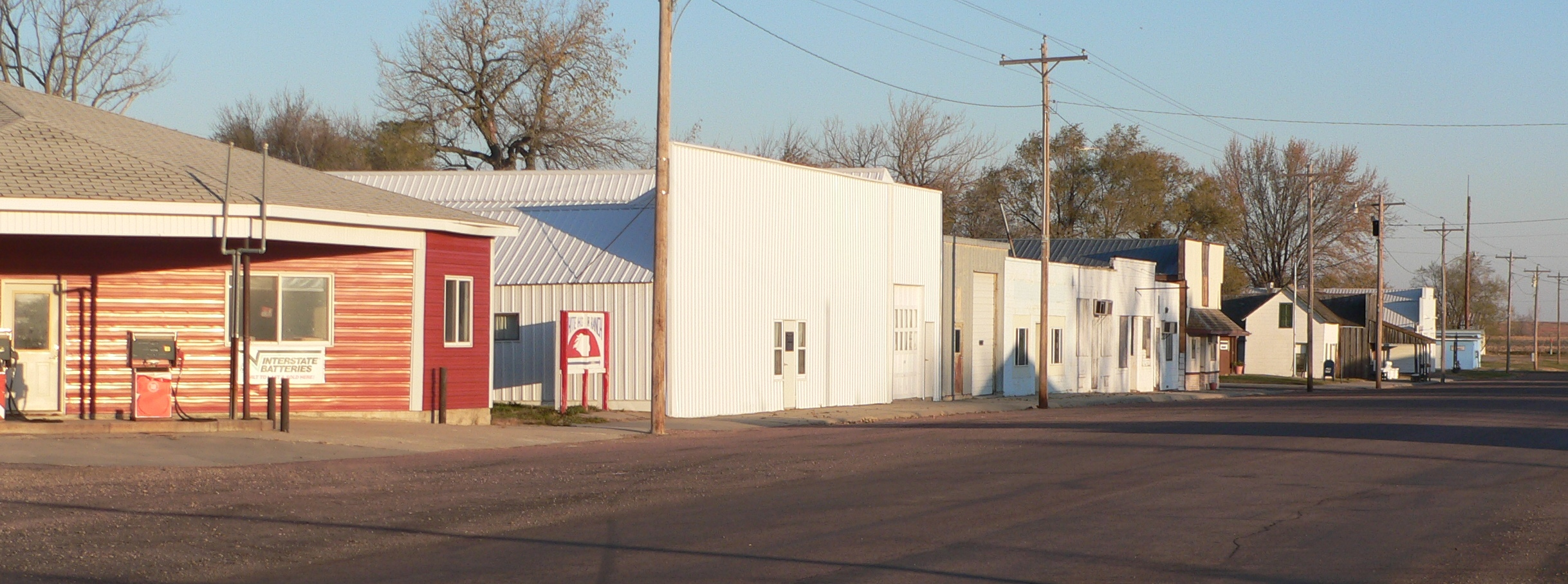
- Downtown Naper

- Location of Naper, Nebraska
- Coordinates: 42°57′51″N 99°05′49″W
- Country: United States
- State: Nebraska
- County: Boyd

Area
  - Total: 0.14 sq mi (0.35 km^{2})
  - Land: 0.14 sq mi (0.35 km^{2})
  - Water: 0 sq mi (0.00 km^{2})
- Elevation: 1,985 ft (605 m)

Population (2020)
  - Total: 89
  - Density: 658.1/sq mi (254.09/km^{2})
- Time zone: UTC-6 (Central (CST))
  - Summer (DST): UTC-5 (CDT)
- ZIP code: 68755
- Area code: 402
- FIPS code: 31-33530
- GNIS feature ID: 2399434

Naper is a village in Boyd County, Nebraska, United States. The population was 89 at the 2020 census, up from 84 at the 2010 census.

== History ==
Naper was founded in 1892. It was named for Ralph Naper, an original owner of the town site.

== Geography ==
According to the United States Census Bureau, the village has a total area of 0.14 square miles (0.36 km^{2}), all land.

== Demographics ==
Historical population
Census	Pop.	Note	%±
1900	94		—
1910	300		219.1%
1920	199		−33.7%
1930	176		−11.6%
1940	195		10.8%
1950	188		−3.6%
1960	198		5.3%
1970	159		−19.7%
1980	136		−14.5%
1990	130		−4.4%
2000	105		−19.2%
2010	84		−20.0%
2020	89		6.0%
U.S. Decennial Census

=== 2010 census ===
As of the census of 2010, there were 84 people, 42 households, and 26 families living in the village. The population density was 600.0 inhabitants per square mile (231.7/km^{2}). There were 66 housing units at an average density of 471.4 per square mile (182.0/km^{2}). The racial makeup of the village was 94.0% White, 1.2% Native American, 1.2% Asian, and 3.6% from other races. Hispanic or Latino of any race were 3.6% of the population.

There were 42 households, of which 11.9% had children under the age of 18 living with them, 59.5% were married couples living together, 2.4% had a female householder with no husband present, and 38.1% were non-families. 35.7% of all households were made up of individuals, and 23.8% had someone living alone who was 65 years of age or older. The average household size was 2.00 and the average family size was 2.54.

The median age in the village was 52 years. 10.7% of residents were under the age of 18; 10.8% were between the ages of 18 and 24; 19.1% were from 25 to 44; 25.1% were from 45 to 64; and 34.5% were 65 years of age or older. The gender makeup of the village was 50.0% male and 50.0% female.

=== 2000 census ===
As of the census of 2000, there were 105 people, 54 households, and 32 families living in the village. The population density was 781.8 inhabitants per square mile (301.9/km^{2}). There were 66 housing units at an average density of 491.4 per square mile (189.7/km^{2}). The racial makeup of the village was 99.05% White, and 0.95% from two or more races. Hispanic or Latino of any race were 0.95% of the population.

There were 54 households, out of which 18.5% had children under the age of 18 living with them, 48.1% were married couples living together, 5.6% had a female householder with no husband present, and 40.7% were non-families. 37.0% of all households were made up of individuals, and 25.9% had someone living alone who was 65 years of age or older. The average household size was 1.94 and the average family size was 2.53.

In the village, the population was spread out, with 18.1% under the age of 18, 3.8% from 18 to 24, 19.0% from 25 to 44, 20.0% from 45 to 64, and 39.0% who were 65 years of age or older. The median age was 52 years. For every 100 females, there were 101.9 males. For every 100 females age 18 and over, there were 95.5 males.

As of 2000 the median income for a household in the village was $17,500, and the median income for a family was $19,375. Males had a median income of $20,000 versus $33,125 for females. The per capita income for the village was $11,279. There were 10.3% of families and 16.8% of the population living below the poverty line, including 22.2% of under eighteens and 11.5% of those over 64.

== Education ==
It is in Boyd County Public Schools, established in June 2017. It was previously in West Boyd Schools, which was established in a merger in July 2007.

== Media ==
Since 2003, the Naper Historical Society has published and distributed a quarterly newsletter, The Naper Paper, for citizens and former citizens and friends of the town.
