= McCulley Township, Boyd County, Nebraska =

McCulley Township
- Township
- Location in Boyd County
- Coordinates: 42°56′23″N 098°57′08″W
- Country: United States
- State: Nebraska
- County: Boyd

Area
  - Total: 53.02 sq mi (137.33 km^{2})
  - Land: 53.00 sq mi (137.27 km^{2})
  - Water: 0.023 sq mi (0.06 km^{2}) 0.04%
- Elevation: 1,824 ft (556 m)

Population (2020)
  - Total: 98
  - Density: 2.1/sq mi (0.8/km^{2})
- GNIS feature ID: 0838122

McCulley Township is one of nine townships in Boyd County, Nebraska, United States. The population was 98 at the 2020 census.

== See also ==
- County government in Nebraska
