= Morton Township, Boyd County, Nebraska =

Morton Township
- Township
- Location in Boyd County
- Coordinates: 42°56′27″N 098°36′25″W
- Country: United States
- State: Nebraska
- County: Boyd

Area
  - Total: 52.51 sq mi (136.01 km^{2})
  - Land: 52.48 sq mi (135.93 km^{2})
  - Water: 0.031 sq mi (0.08 km^{2}) 0.06%
- Elevation: 1,781 ft (543 m)

Population (2020)
  - Total: 67
  - Density: 2.6/sq mi (1/km^{2})
- GNIS feature ID: 0838146

Morton Township is one of nine townships in Boyd County, Nebraska, United States. The population was 67 at the 2020 census.

The Village of Gross lies within the Township.

== See also ==
- County government in Nebraska
