= Monowi, Nebraska =

Incorporated US community with a population of 1

- Village
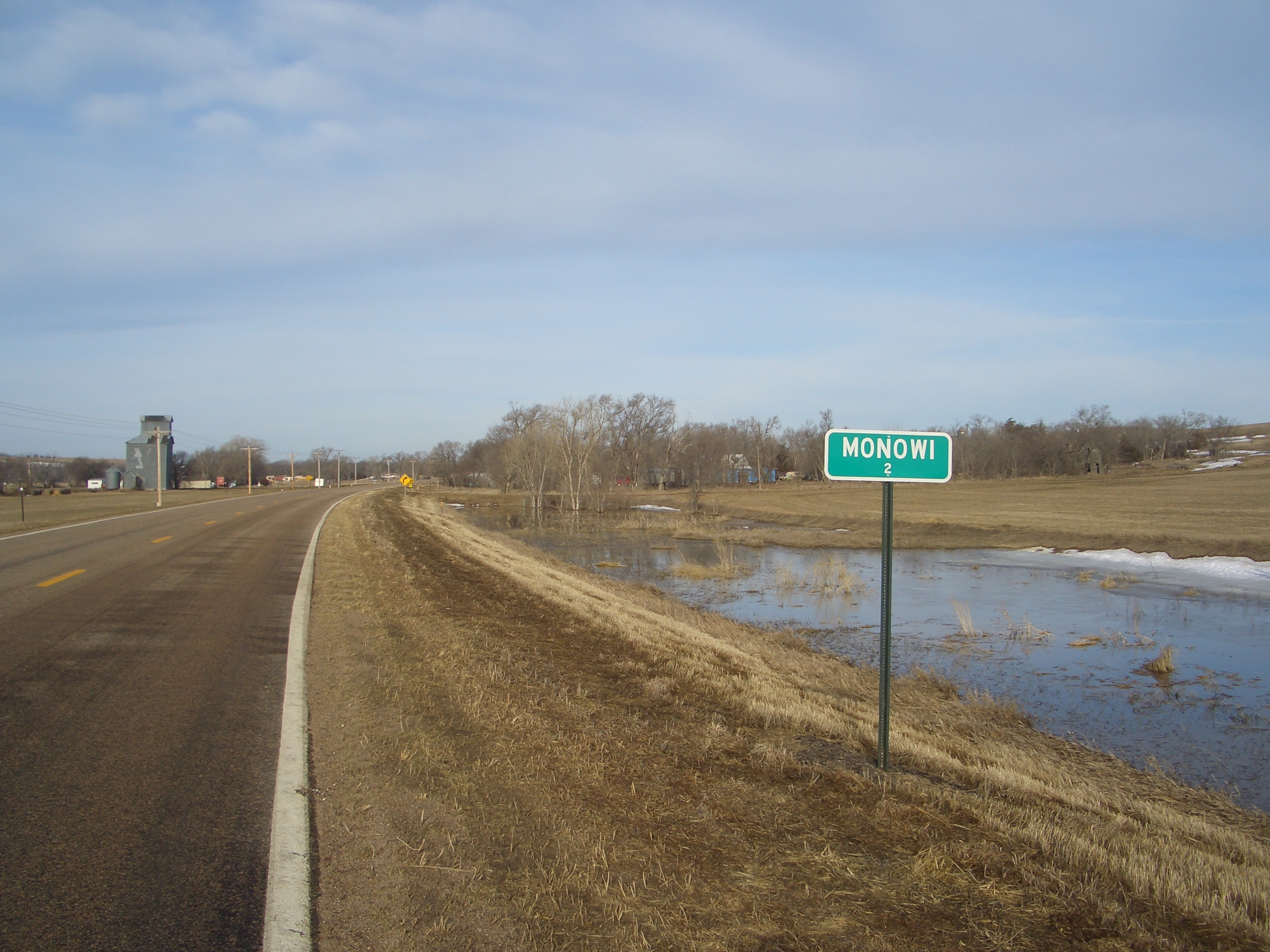
- Town sign that can be seen on approaching Monowi from the east (2007)

- Location within Boyd County

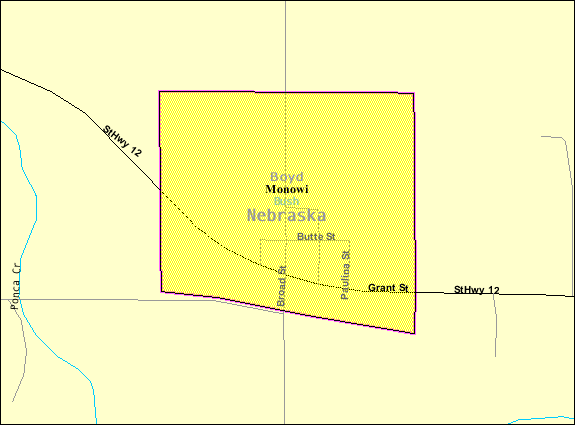
- Detailed map of Monowi, Nebraska

- Location within Nebraska Location within the United States
- Coordinates: 42°49′51″N 98°19′46″W
- Country: United States
- State: Nebraska
- County: Boyd

Government
  - Mayor: Elsie Eiler

Area
  - Total: 0.21 sq mi (0.55 km^{2})
  - Land: 0.21 sq mi (0.55 km^{2})
  - Water: 0 sq mi (0.00 km^{2})
- Elevation: 1,368 ft (417 m)

Population (2020)
  - Total: 1
  - Density: 4.7/sq mi (1.81/km^{2})
- Time zone: UTC-6 (Central (CST))
  - Summer (DST): UTC-5 (CDT)
- ZIP code: 68746 (shared with Lynch)
- Area code: 402
- FIPS code: 31-32550
- GNIS feature ID: 2399382

Monowi (/ˈmɒnoʊwaɪ/, MON-oh-wye) is the least populous incorporated village in the United States by having a population of one. It is in Boyd County, Nebraska, United States, and received national and international attention after the 2010 United States census recorded only one resident in the village, Elsie Eiler, who serves as its mayor, librarian, clerk, and treasurer. According to the 2020 census, Monowi had a population of 2. This was later confirmed to be an example of differential privacy in the census data; Eiler remains the town's sole resident.

According to tradition, the name Monowi means "flower" in an unidentified Native American language. Monowi was named after the many wildflowers growing at the original site of the village.

== History ==
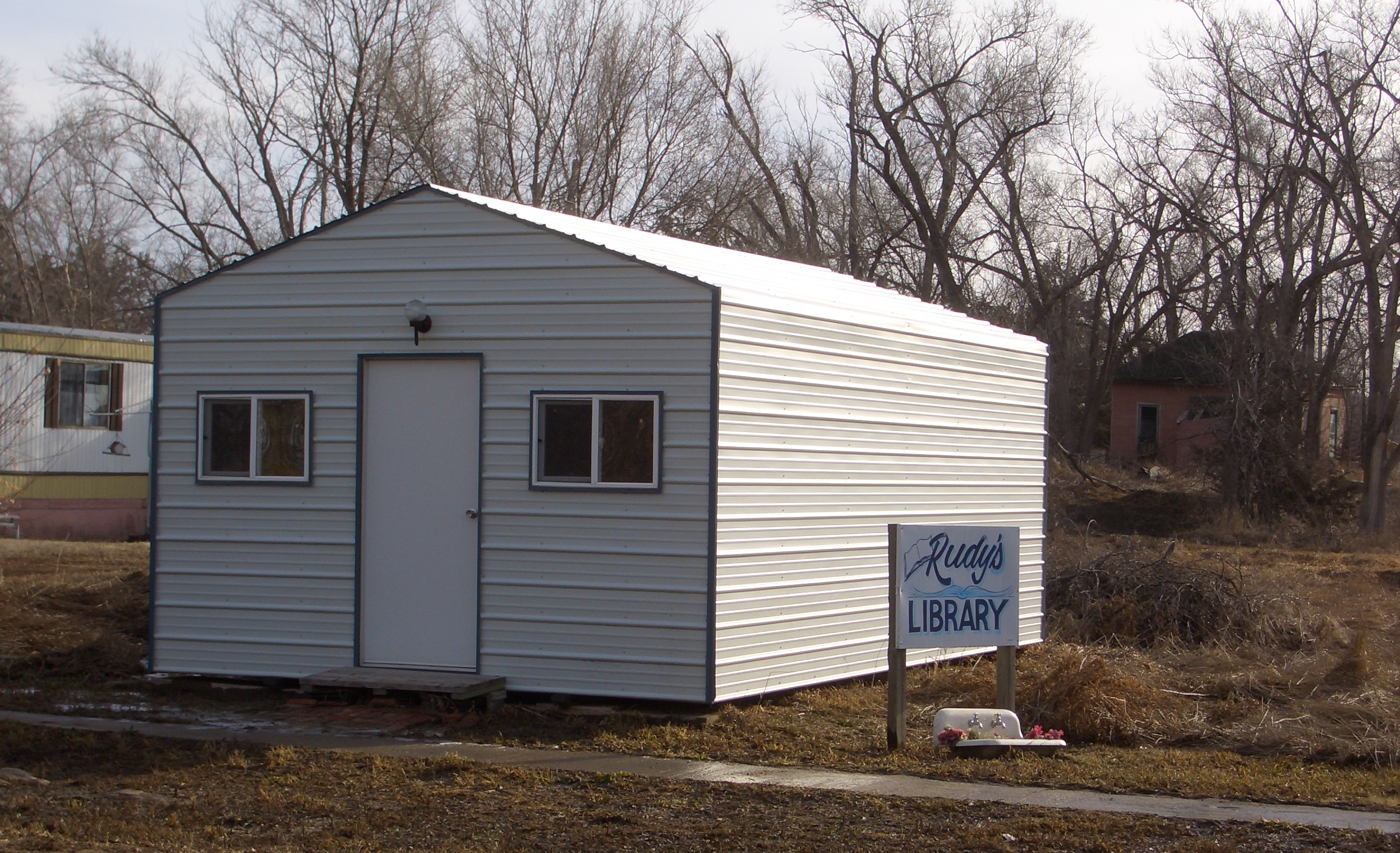
Rudy's Library

Historical population
Census	Pop.	Note	%±
1910	109		—
1920	100		−8.3%
1930	123		23.0%
1940	99		−19.5%
1950	67		−32.3%
1960	40		−40.3%
1970	16		−60.0%
1980	18		12.5%
1990	6		−66.7%
2000	2		−66.7%
2010	1		−50.0%
2020	2		100.0%
U.S. Decennial Census; 2020

Monowi was platted in 1902 following the extension of the Mason, Elkhorn and Missouri Valley Railroad to the area. A post office was established in Monowi in 1902 and operated until its closure in 1967.

Monowi reached its peak population in the 1930s, when approximately 150 people lived in the village. Like many other small communities in the Great Plains, it lost its younger residents to larger cities that were experiencing growth and offering better employment opportunities.

During the 2000 census, the village recorded a total population of two, consisting of a married couple, Rudy and Elsie Eiler. Rudy died in 2004, leaving his wife as the village's sole resident. In this role, she serves as mayor and issued herself a liquor license. She is also required to submit an annual municipal road plan to maintain state funding for the village's four streetlights.

Although the village is nearly abandoned, it does have a bar called the Monowi Tavern, operated by Eiler for passing travelers and tourists. She also maintains Rudy's Library, a collection of approximately 5,000 volumes established in memory of her late husband.

In 2018, the village was featured in commercials for Arby's and Prudential Financial. The village was also used as a starting place for the biggest advertisement poster in the world, which was finished on June 13, 2018. The poster in question consisted of the words "Arby's now has Coke." in red on a blank white sheet.

=== Census data ===
After the 1990 census, Eiler noticed that Monowi's population had been miscounted and contacted radio broadcaster Paul Harvey to publicize the error. During the 2020 census, preliminary information appeared to show that Monowi's population had increased to two. However, Eiler denied that anyone had moved into the town, and a spokesperson for the United States Census Bureau explained that the alleged second resident was the result of "noise... add[ed] to the [census] data," in which some individuals are listed in a bordering tract to protect the anonymity of census respondents.

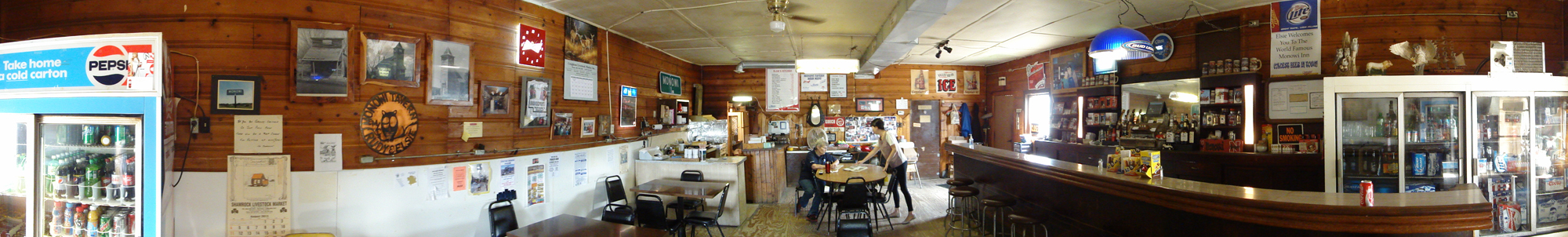
Monowi Tavern, 2013

== Geography ==
According to the U.S. Census Bureau, the village has a total area of 0.21 square miles (0.54 km^{2}), all land. The village is located in the far eastern portion of Boyd County, in the northeastern region of Nebraska. It is located between the Niobrara River and the larger Missouri River. The nearest community to Monowi is Lynch, located approximately 7 miles (11 km) away. Omaha, the largest city in the region, is located approximately 195 miles (314 km) southeast.

== Demographics ==
As of 2010, only one person lived in Monowi: a white female named Elsie Eiler, born 1933, living alone in one of the town's three housing units, the others unoccupied.

== Education ==
The area is within Boyd County Public Schools. The area was previously within the Lynch Public Schools district in Lynch. The Lynch district consolidated into the Boyd County district in June 2017.

== See also ==
- Hibberts Gore, Maine – a US community with a population of one
- Buford, Wyoming – an abandoned unincorporated community in the US that gained media attention in 2011 for housing one person
- Ruso, North Dakota – an incorporated city in McLean County, North Dakota, with a population of one
