= Saint-Nazaire-le-Désert =

- Commune
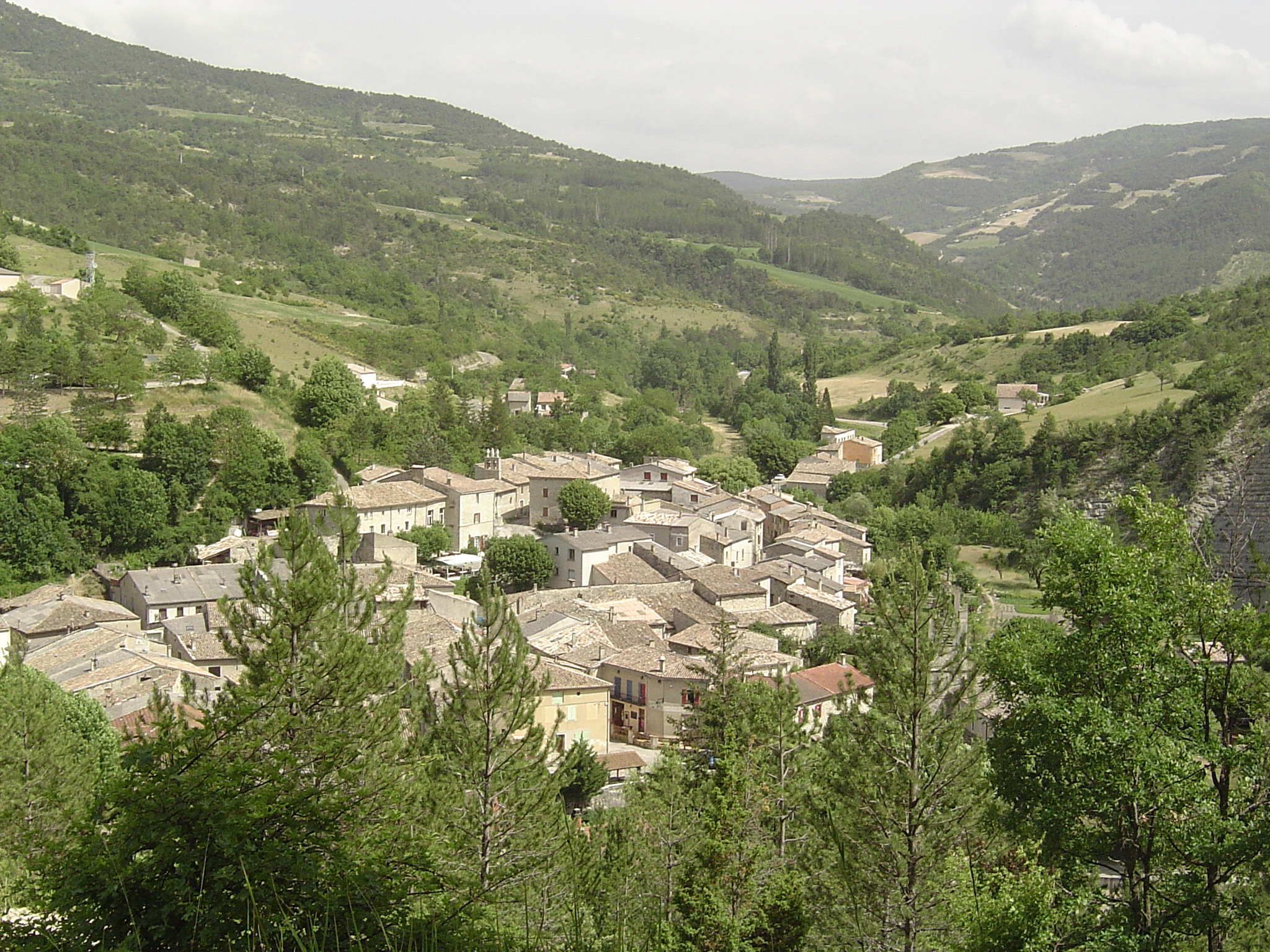
- A view of Saint-Nazaire-le-Désert
- Location of Saint-Nazaire-le-Désert
- Location within France Location within Auvergne-Rhône-Alpes
- Coordinates: 44°34′15″N 5°16′36″E
- Country: France
- Region: Auvergne-Rhône-Alpes
- Department: Drôme
- Arrondissement: Die
- Canton: Le Diois

Government
  - Mayor (2020–2026): Daniel Fernandez
- Area^{1}: 46.62 km^{2} (18.00 sq mi)
- Elevation: 591 m (1,939 ft)
- Highest elevation: 1,447 m (4,747 ft)
- Lowest elevation: 527 m (1,729 ft)
- Population (2023): 206
  - Density: 4.42/km^{2} (11.4/sq mi)
- Time zone: UTC+01:00 (CET)
  - Summer (DST): UTC+02:00 (CEST)
- INSEE/Postal code: 26321 /26340
- ^{1} French Land Register data, which excludes lakes, ponds, glaciers > 1 km^{2} (0.386 sq mi or 247 acres) and river estuaries.

Saint-Nazaire-le-Désert (French: [sɛ̃ nazɛːʁ lə dezɛʁ]; Occitan: Sant Nazari dau Desert) is a commune in the Drôme department in the Auvergne-Rhône-Alpes region in southeastern France.

== History ==
Archaeology suggests that people have settled in the area for over six thousand years. Fragments of Iron Age vases for roasting wheat have been found in the area. There is also a ruined castle, sacred architecture and a sixteenth-century church on water.

== Population ==
Historical population
Year	Pop.	±% p.a.
1968	257	—
1975	205	−3.18%
1982	197	−0.57%
1990	168	−1.97%
1999	183	+0.95%
2007	139	−3.38%
2012	142	+0.43%
2017	193	+6.33%
2023	206	+1.09%
Source: INSEE

== Economy ==
The French goat's cheese Picodon is made in and around the area of Saint-Nazaire-le-Désert. Lavender is grown locally and products containing lavender are popular.

== See also ==
- Communes of the Drôme department
