= Gross, Nebraska =

Village in Nebraska, US

- Village
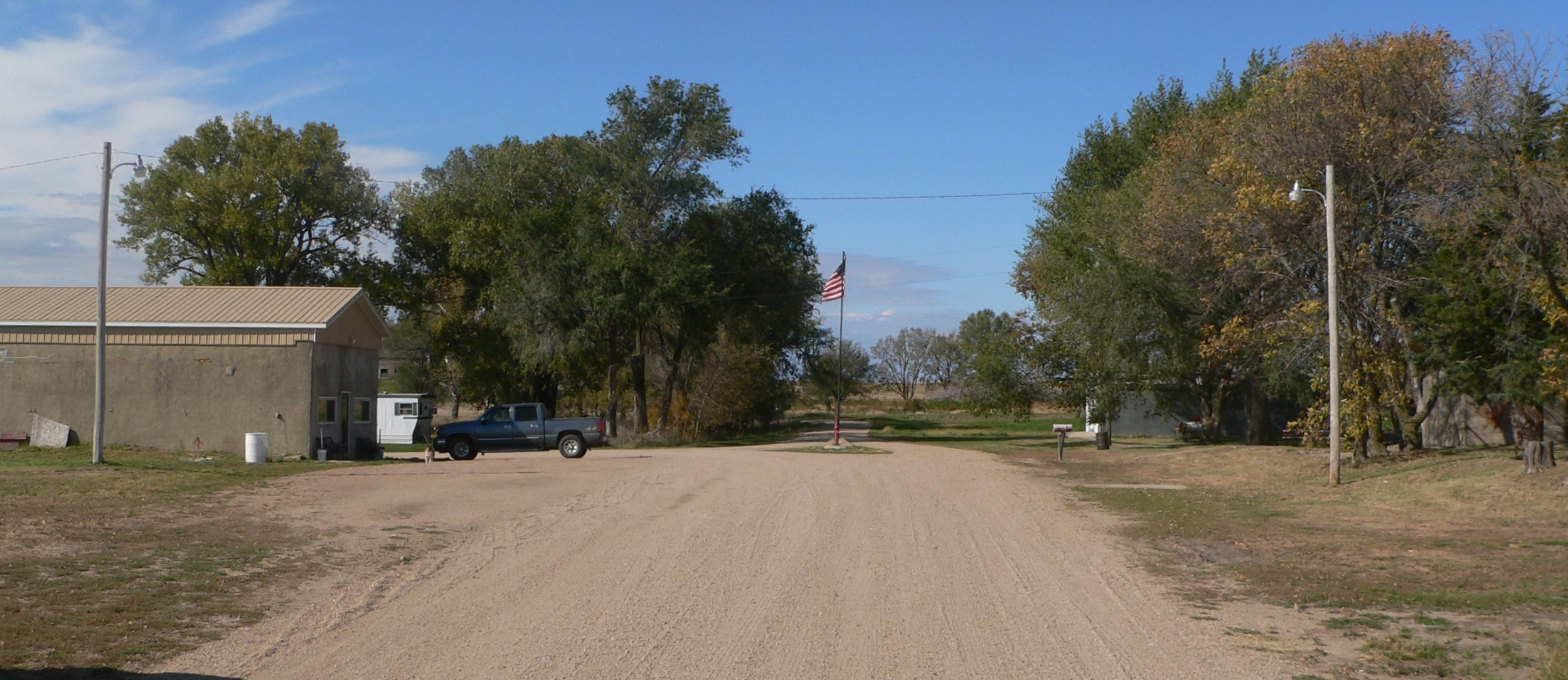
- Downtown Gross

- Location of Gross, Nebraska
- Coordinates: 42°56′46″N 98°34′11″W
- Country: United States
- State: Nebraska
- County: Boyd
- Established: 1893

Government
  - Type: Mayor – Council
  - Mayor: Michael Finnegan

Area
  - Total: 0.13 sq mi (0.33 km^{2})
  - Land: 0.13 sq mi (0.33 km^{2})
  - Water: 0 sq mi (0.00 km^{2})
- Elevation: 1,768 ft (539 m)

Population (2020)
  - Total: 3
  - Density: 23.4/sq mi (9.05/km^{2})
- Time zone: UTC-6 (Central (CST))
  - Summer (DST): UTC-5 (CDT)
- ZIP code: 68719
- Area codes: 402 and 531
- FIPS code: 31-20295
- GNIS feature ID: 2398211

Gross is a village in Boyd County, Nebraska, United States. As of the 2020 census, the village had a total population of 3. In the 2000 United States census, it was one of only eight places with a population of five people. The others were Storrie, California; Baker, Missouri; Odell, New Hampshire; Maza, North Dakota; Somerset, Vermont, and Prudhoe Bay, Alaska.

== History ==
Gross was founded in 1893. It was named for Ben Gross, who kept a general store.

== Geography ==
According to the United States Census Bureau, the village has a total area of 0.13 square miles (0.34 km^{2}), all land.

== Demographics ==
Historical population
Census	Pop.	Note	%±
1900	325		—
1910	111		−65.8%
1920	84		−24.3%
1930	51		−39.3%
1940	23		−54.9%
1950	29		26.1%
1960	17		−41.4%
1970	8		−52.9%
1980	2		−75.0%
1990	7		250.0%
2000	5		−28.6%
2010	2		−60.0%
2020	3		50.0%
U.S. Decennial Census; 2012 Estimate

=== 2010 census ===
As of the census of 2010, there were 2 people, 1 household, and 1 family residing in the village. The population density was 15.4 inhabitants per square mile (5.9/km^{2}). There were 4 housing units at an average density of 30.8 per square mile (11.9/km^{2}). The racial makeup of the village was 100.0% White.

There was 1 household of which 100.0% were married couples living together. 0.0% of households were made up of individuals. The average household size was 2.00 and the average family size was 2.00.

The median age in the village was 49 years. 0.0% of residents were under the age of 18; 0.0% were between the ages of 18 and 24; 0.0% were from 25 to 44; 100% were from 45 to 64; and 0.0% were 65 or older. The gender makeup of the village was 50.0% male and 50.0% female.

=== 2000 census ===
As of the census of 2000, there were 5 people, 1 household, and 1 family residing in the village. The population density was 38.3 inhabitants per square mile (14.8/km^{2}). There was 1 housing unit at an average density of 7.7 per square mile (3.0/km^{2}). The racial makeup of the village was 100.00% White.

There was 1 household, of which 100.0% were married couple living together, with children under the age of 18 living with them. Consequently, the average household size and the average family size was 5.00.

The age distribution was 20.0% under 18, 40.0% from 18 to 24, 20.0% from 25 to 44, 20.0% from 45 to 64, and 0.0% over 64 years of age. The median age was 22 years. For every 100 females there were 150.0 males. For every 100 females age 18 and over, there were 100.0 males.

=== CNN profile ===
The town was the subject of a profile on CNN in November 2018 when, to mark that year's Thanksgiving, Gross' two inhabitants hosted a family reunion that briefly swelled its population to 20.

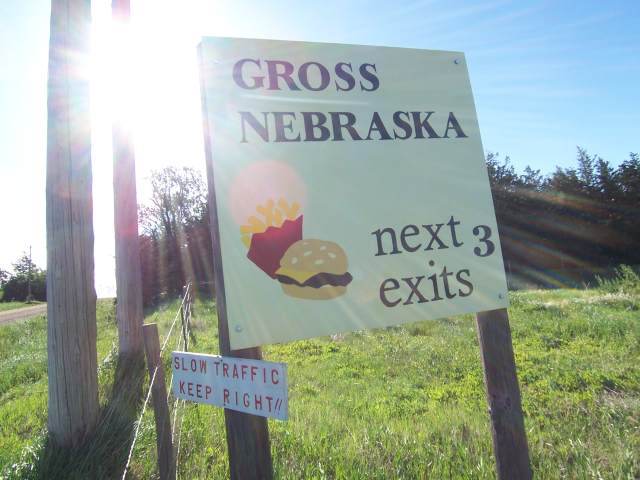

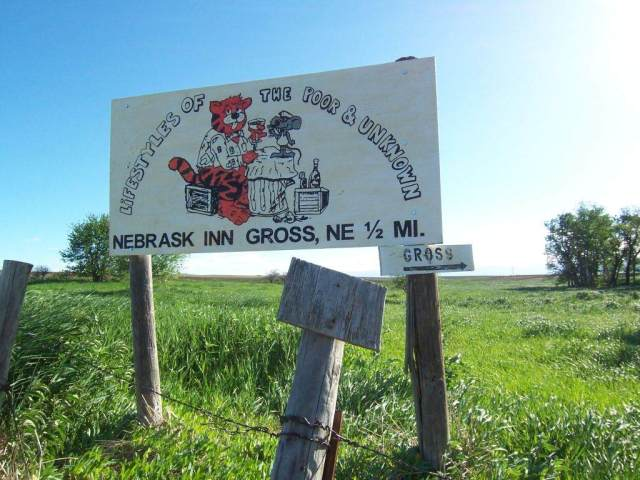

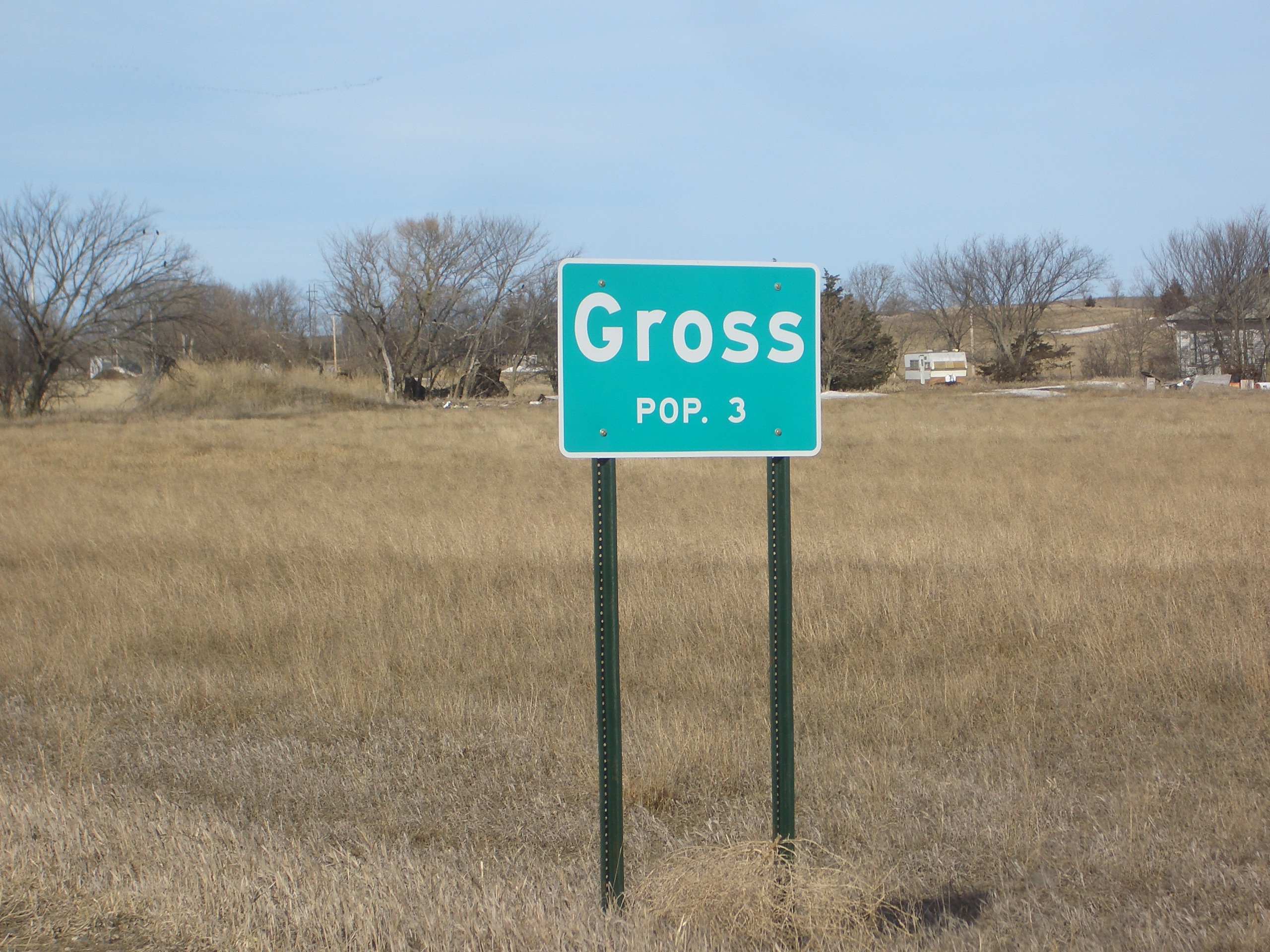
Sign listing the population as 3

== Education ==
Gross is in Boyd County Schools, established in June 2017.

Gross was formerly in West Boyd Public Schools, which was established in a merger in July 2007.
