= Boyd County, Nebraska =

County in Nebraska, United States

- County
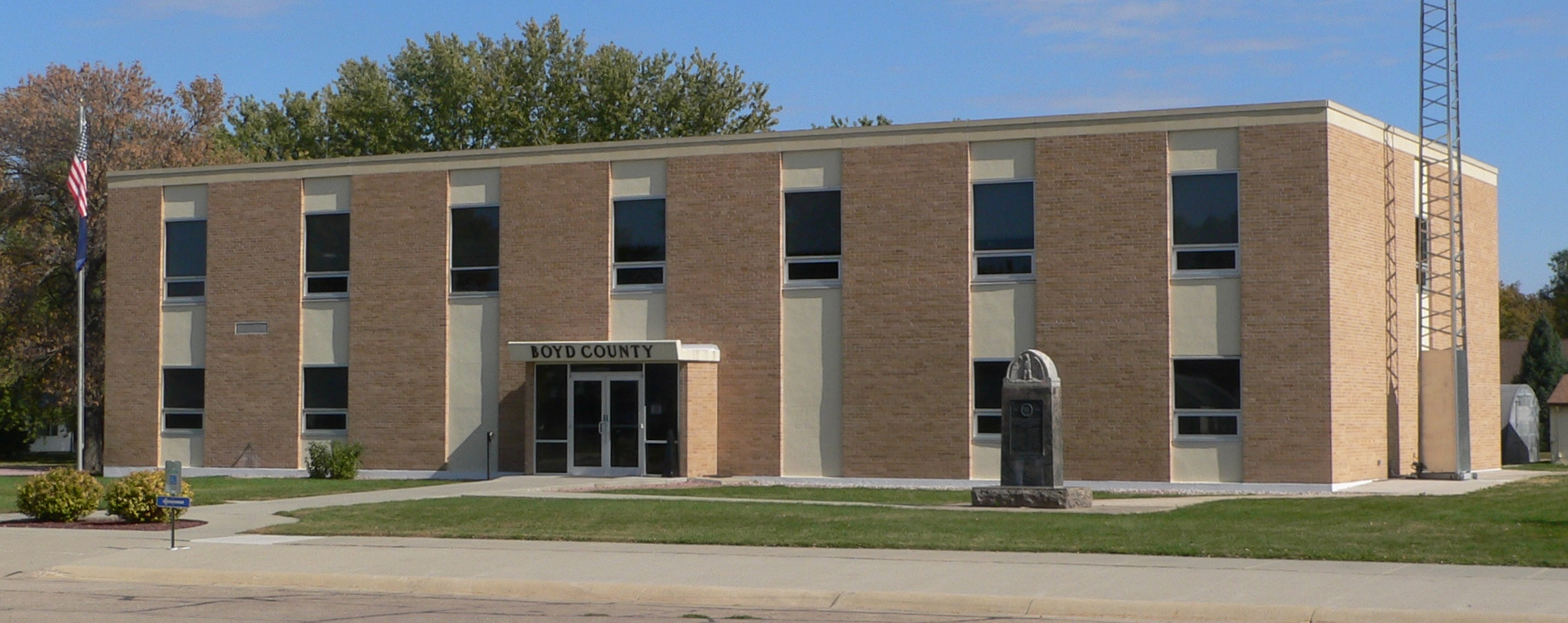
- The Boyd County Courthouse in Butte

- Location within the U.S. state of Nebraska
- Coordinates: 42.894448°N 98.773022°W
- Country: United States
- State: Nebraska
- Founded: August 1, 1891
- Named for: James E. Boyd
- Seat: Butte
- Largest village: Spencer

Area
  - Total: 544.527 sq mi (1,410.32 km^{2})
  - Land: 539.368 sq mi (1,396.96 km^{2})
  - Water: 5.159 sq mi (13.36 km^{2}) 0.95%

Population (2020)
  - Total: 1,810
  - Estimate (2025): 1,674 ▼
  - Density: 3.36/sq mi (1.30/km^{2})
- Time zone: UTC−6 (Central)
  - Summer (DST): UTC−5 (CDT)
- Area code: 402 and 531
- Congressional district: 3rd
- Website: boydcounty.ne.gov
- • Nebraska county number 08 • Nebraska license plate prefix 63

Boyd County is a county in the U.S. state of Nebraska. As of the 2020 census, the population was 1,810. and was estimated to be 1,674 in 2025. The county seat is Butte and the largest village is Spencer.

In the Nebraska license plate system, Boyd County was represented by the prefix "63" (as it had the 63rd-largest number of vehicles registered in the state when the license plate system was established in 1922).

== History ==
Boyd County was created on August 1, 1891 and named after James E. Boyd, the governor of Nebraska at the time.

In the 2010 census, three incorporated villages had populations of fewer than 10 people: Anoka, population 6, Gross, population 2, and Monowi, population 1. Monowi was the only incorporated city in the United States with only one resident at the 2010 census.

All land north of the Keya Paha River (which includes most of Boyd County and a smaller portion of neighboring Keya Paha County) was not originally part of Nebraska at the time of statehood, but was transferred from Dakota Territory in 1882.

== Geography ==
According to the United States Census Bureau, the county has a total area of 544.527 square miles (1,410.32 km^{2}), of which 539.368 square miles (1,396.96 km^{2}) is land and 5.159 square miles (13.36 km^{2}) (0.95%) is water. It is the 73rd-largest county in Nebraska by total area.

Boyd County is in Nebraska's Outback region.

=== Major highways ===
- U.S. Highway 281
- Nebraska Highway 11
- Nebraska Highway 12

=== Adjacent counties ===
- Charles Mix County, South Dakota – northeast
- Knox County – southeast
- Holt County – south
- Rock County – southwest
- Keya Paha County – west
- Gregory County, South Dakota – northwest

=== National protected areas ===
- Karl E. Mundt National Wildlife Refuge (part)
- Missouri National Recreational River (part)

== Demographics ==
Historical population
Census	Pop.	Note	%±
1890	695		—
1900	7,332		955.0%
1910	8,826		20.4%
1920	8,243		−6.6%
1930	7,169		−13.0%
1940	6,060		−15.5%
1950	4,911		−19.0%
1960	4,513		−8.1%
1970	3,752		−16.9%
1980	3,331		−11.2%
1990	2,835		−14.9%
2000	2,438		−14.0%
2010	2,099		−13.9%
2020	1,810		−13.8%
2025 (est.)	1,674	▼	−7.5%
U.S. Decennial Census; 1790–1960 1900–1990; 1990–2000 2010–2020

=== 2020 census ===
As of the 2020 census, the county had a population of 1,810. The median age was 55.1 years. 19.2% of residents were under the age of 18 and 31.8% of residents were 65 years of age or older. For every 100 females there were 100.0 males, and for every 100 females age 18 and over there were 102.8 males age 18 and over.

The racial makeup of the county was 95.2% White, 0.0% Black or African American, 1.0% American Indian and Alaska Native, 0.0% Asian, 0.0% Native Hawaiian and Pacific Islander, 0.7% from some other race, and 3.0% from two or more races. Hispanic or Latino residents of any race comprised 1.8% of the population.

0.0% of residents lived in urban areas, while 100.0% lived in rural areas.

There were 833 households in the county, of which 19.9% had children under the age of 18 living with them and 20.9% had a female householder with no spouse or partner present. About 34.6% of all households were made up of individuals and 20.5% had someone living alone who was 65 years of age or older.

There were 1,226 housing units, of which 32.1% were vacant. Among occupied housing units, 80.9% were owner-occupied and 19.1% were renter-occupied. The homeowner vacancy rate was 2.4% and the rental vacancy rate was 15.0%.

=== 2000 census ===
As of the 2000 census, there were 2,438 people, 1,014 households, and 670 families in the county. The population density was 4 people per square mile (1.5 people/km^{2}). There were 1,406 housing units at an average density of 3 units per square mile (1.2/km^{2}). The racial makeup of the county was 98.89% White, 0.57% Native American, 0.16% Asian, and 0.37% from two or more races. 0.08% of the population were Hispanic or Latino of any race. 45.2% were of German, 10.0% American, 9.3% Czech, 7.8% Irish, 6.9% English and 5.9% Swedish ancestry.

There were 1,014 households, out of which 29.00% had children under the age of 18 living with them, 59.40% were married couples living together, 3.70% had a female householder with no husband present, and 33.90% were non-families. 32.00% of all households were made up of individuals, and 19.60% had someone living alone who was 65 years of age or older. The average household size was 2.36 and the average family size was 2.98.

The county population contained 25.00% under the age of 18, 5.40% from 18 to 24, 21.20% from 25 to 44, 24.10% from 45 to 64, and 24.30% who were 65 years of age or older. The median age was 44 years. For every 100 females there were 93.30 males. For every 100 females age 18 and over, there were 94.60 males.

The median income for a household in the county was $26,075, and the median income for a family was $32,000. Males had a median income of $20,859 versus $17,688 for females. The per capita income for the county was $13,840. About 12.90% of families and 15.20% of the population were below the poverty line, including 19.60% of those under age 18 and 11.20% of those age 65 or over.

== Communities ==
=== Villages ===
- Anoka
- Bristow
- Butte (county seat)
- Gross
- Lynch
- Monowi
- Naper
- Spencer

=== Townships ===
- Basin
- Bristow
- Bush
- Butte
- Lynch
- McCulley
- Morton
- Mullen
- Spencer

=== Ghost towns ===
- Baker
- Doty
- Mankato
- Rosedale

== Politics ==
United States presidential election results for Boyd County, Nebraska
Year	Republican		Democratic		Third party(ies)	
Year	No.	%	No.	%	No.	%
1892	528	44.44%	184	15.49%	476	40.07%
1896	500	41.53%	657	54.57%	47	3.90%
1900	771	47.45%	795	48.92%	59	3.63%
1904	1,233	64.35%	328	17.12%	355	18.53%
1908	954	50.05%	891	46.75%	61	3.20%
1912	281	16.90%	651	39.15%	731	43.96%
1916	809	46.98%	852	49.48%	61	3.54%
1920	1,482	70.04%	527	24.91%	107	5.06%
1924	991	37.57%	522	19.79%	1,125	42.65%
1928	1,653	58.72%	1,143	40.60%	19	0.67%
1932	808	27.32%	2,098	70.95%	51	1.72%
1936	1,290	44.48%	1,555	53.62%	55	1.90%
1940	1,734	62.13%	1,057	37.87%	0	0.00%
1944	1,456	61.93%	895	38.07%	0	0.00%
1948	1,060	50.60%	1,035	49.40%	0	0.00%
1952	1,656	68.63%	757	31.37%	0	0.00%
1956	1,414	62.51%	848	37.49%	0	0.00%
1960	1,393	64.46%	768	35.54%	0	0.00%
1964	1,100	54.78%	908	45.22%	0	0.00%
1968	1,250	64.63%	437	22.60%	247	12.77%
1972	1,419	73.71%	506	26.29%	0	0.00%
1976	1,004	55.13%	792	43.49%	25	1.37%
1980	1,261	72.76%	376	21.70%	96	5.54%
1984	1,175	78.54%	308	20.59%	13	0.87%
1988	967	65.92%	480	32.72%	20	1.36%
1992	744	47.36%	353	22.47%	474	30.17%
1996	778	57.97%	372	27.72%	192	14.31%
2000	931	74.96%	265	21.34%	46	3.70%
2004	911	79.36%	228	19.86%	9	0.78%
2008	839	75.59%	250	22.52%	21	1.89%
2012	873	81.51%	188	17.55%	10	0.93%
2016	983	85.03%	128	11.07%	45	3.89%
2020	1,010	87.45%	135	11.69%	10	0.87%
2024	938	87.17%	132	12.27%	6	0.56%

== See also ==
- National Register of Historic Places listings in Boyd County, Nebraska
- Nuclear Nebraska
