= Anoka, Nebraska =

Village in Nebraska, US

- Village
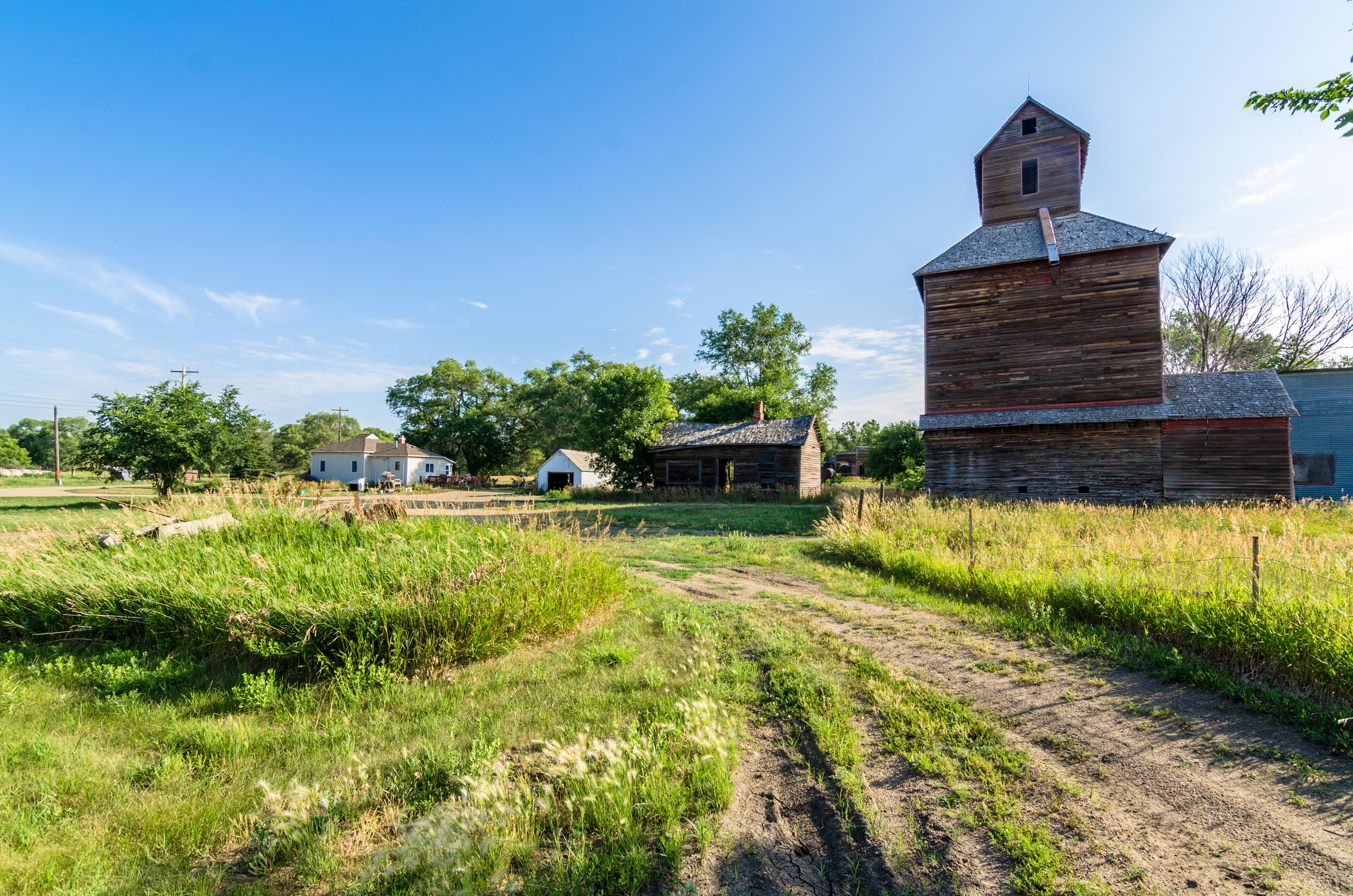
- South side of Anoka

- Location of Anoka, Nebraska
- Coordinates: 42°56′46″N 98°49′43″W
- Country: United States
- State: Nebraska
- County: Boyd

Area
  - Total: 0.56 sq mi (1.45 km^{2})
  - Land: 0.56 sq mi (1.45 km^{2})
  - Water: 0 sq mi (0.00 km^{2})
- Elevation: 1,650 ft (500 m)

Population (2020)
  - Total: 10
  - Density: 17.8/sq mi (6.89/km^{2})
- Time zone: UTC-6 (Central (CST))
  - Summer (DST): UTC-5 (CDT)
- ZIP code: 68722
- Area codes: 402 and 531
- FIPS code: 31-01465
- GNIS feature ID: 239796

Anoka is a village in Boyd County, Nebraska, United States. The population was 10 at the 2020 census up from 6 in 2010.

== History ==
Anoka was laid out in 1902. The village was named after Anoka, Minnesota.

== Geography ==
According to the United States Census Bureau, the village has a total area of 0.56 square miles (1.45 km^{2}), all land.

== Demographics ==
Historical population
Census	Pop.	Note	%±
1910	145		—
1920	129		−11.0%
1930	107		−17.1%
1940	117		9.3%
1950	60		−48.7%
1960	32		−46.7%
1970	25		−21.9%
1980	24		−4.0%
1990	10		−58.3%
2000	10		0.0%
2010	6		−40.0%
2020	10		66.7%
U.S. Decennial Census; 2012 Estimate

=== 2010 census ===
As of the census of 2010, there were 6 people, 3 households, and 1 family residing in the village. The population density was 10.7 inhabitants per square mile (4.1/km^{2}). There were 6 housing units at an average density of 10.7 per square mile (4.1/km^{2}). The racial makeup of the village was 100.0% White.

There were 3 households, of which 33.3% were married couples living together and 66.7% were non-families. 66.7% of all households were made up of individuals, and 66.7% had someone living alone who was 65 years of age or older. The average household size was 2.00 and the average family size was 3.00.

The median age in the village was 52.5 years. 0.0% of residents were under the age of 18; 33.3% were between the ages of 18 and 24; 0.0% were from 25 to 44; 33.3% were from 45 to 64; and 33.3% were 65 years of age or older. The gender makeup of the village was 50.0% male and 50.0% female.

=== 2000 census ===
As of the census of 2000, there were 10 people, 3 households, and 3 families residing in the village. The population density was 17.7 inhabitants per square mile (6.8/km^{2}). There were 3 housing units at an average density of 5.3 per square mile (2.0/km^{2}). The racial makeup of the village was 100.00% White.

There were 3 households, out of which 66.7% had children under the age of 18 living with them, 100.0% were married couples living together, and 0.0% were non-families. No households were made up of individuals, and none had someone living alone who was 65 years of age or older. The average household size was 3.33 and the average family size was 3.33.

In the village, the population was spread out, with 20.0% under the age of 18, 10.0% from 18 to 24, 20.0% from 25 to 44, 30.0% from 45 to 64, and 20.0% who were 65 years of age or older. The median age was 46 years. For every 100 females there were 66.7 males. For every 100 females age 18 and over, there were 100.0 males.

As of 2000 the median income for a household in the village was $16,250, and the median income for a family was $16,250. Males had a median income of $0 versus $0 for females. The per capita income for the village was $7,625. None of the population and none of the families were below the poverty line.

== Education ==
Anoka is in Boyd County Schools, established in June 2017.

Anoka was formerly in West Boyd Public Schools, which was established in a merger in July 2007.

== Notable person ==
- William E. Forbes, regent of the University of California.
