= Spencer, Nebraska =

Village in Nebraska, US

- Village
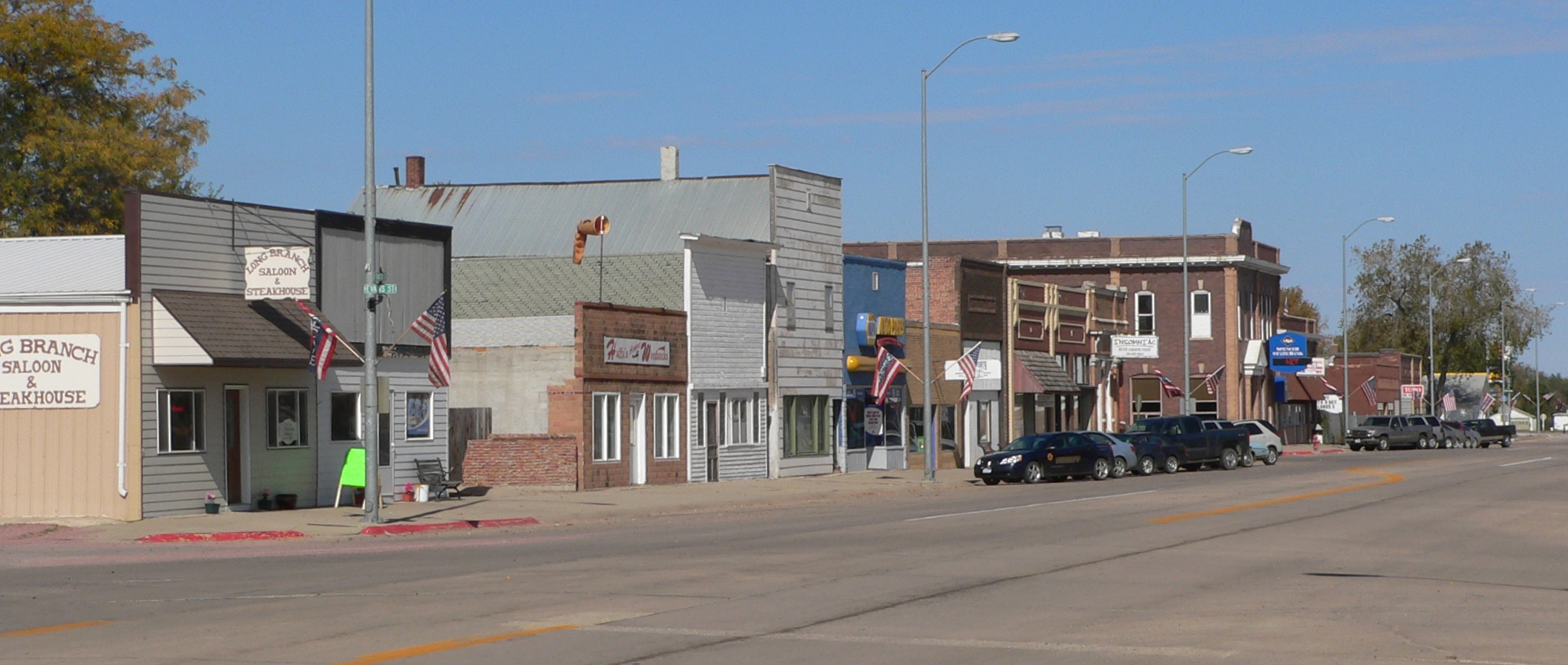
- Thayer Street in Spencer

- Location of Spencer, Nebraska
- Coordinates: 42°52′29″N 98°42′00″W
- Country: United States
- State: Nebraska
- County: Boyd

Area
  - Total: 0.60 sq mi (1.55 km^{2})
  - Land: 0.60 sq mi (1.55 km^{2})
  - Water: 0 sq mi (0.00 km^{2})
- Elevation: 1,677 ft (511 m)

Population (2020)
  - Total: 408
  - Density: 682.6/sq mi (263.57/km^{2})
- Time zone: UTC-6 (Central (CST))
  - Summer (DST): UTC-5 (CDT)
- ZIP code: 68777
- Area code: 402
- FIPS code: 31-46275
- GNIS feature ID: 2399871
- Website: spencernebraska.com

Spencer is a village in Boyd County, Nebraska, United States. The population was 408 at the 2020 census.

== History ==
Spencer was platted in 1891. Sources vary whether it is named for an army captain, or for George E. Spencer, a U.S. senator from Alabama.

== Geography ==
According to the United States Census Bureau, the village has a total area of 0.52 square miles (1.35 km^{2}), all land.

== Demographics ==
Historical population
Census	Pop.	Note	%±
1900	135		—
1910	671		397.0%
1920	728		8.5%
1930	653		−10.3%
1940	635		−2.8%
1950	540		−15.0%
1960	671		24.3%
1970	606		−9.7%
1980	596		−1.7%
1990	536		−10.1%
2000	541		0.9%
2010	455		−15.9%
2020	408		−10.3%
U.S. Decennial Census; 2018 Estimate

=== 2010 census ===
As of the census of 2010, there were 455 people, 221 households, and 128 families living in the village. The population density was 875.0 inhabitants per square mile (337.8/km^{2}). There were 267 housing units at an average density of 513.5 per square mile (198.3/km^{2}). The racial makeup of the village was 95.8% White, 0.2% African American, 1.1% Native American, 1.5% Asian, 0.7% from other races, and 0.7% from two or more races. Hispanic or Latino of any race were 2.9% of the population.

There were 221 households, of which 21.3% had children under the age of 18 living with them, 48.9% were married couples living together, 5.4% had a female householder with no husband present, 3.6% had a male householder with no wife present, and 42.1% were non-families. 39.4% of all households were made up of individuals, and 25.3% had someone living alone who was 65 years of age or older. The average household size was 2.06 and the average family size was 2.75.

The median age in the village was 51.1 years. 19.1% of residents were under the age of 18; 4.9% were between the ages of 18 and 24; 17.2% were from 25 to 44; 30.8% were from 45 to 64; and 28.1% were 65 years of age or older. The gender makeup of the village was 45.9% male and 54.1% female.

=== 2000 census ===
As of the census of 2000, there were 541 people, 230 households, and 143 families living in the village. The population density was 1,031.2 inhabitants per square mile (398.1/km^{2}). There were 272 housing units at an average density of 518.4 per square mile (200.2/km^{2}). The racial makeup of the village was 99.63% White and 0.37% Native American.

There were 230 households, out of which 30.9% had children under the age of 18 living with them, 52.2% were married couples living together, 7.8% had a female householder with no husband present, and 37.8% were non-families. 36.5% of all households were made up of individuals, and 25.7% had someone living alone who was 65 years of age or older. The average household size was 2.35 and the average family size was 3.12.

In the village, the population was spread out, with 28.3% under the age of 18, 4.6% from 18 to 24, 22.9% from 25 to 44, 18.9% from 45 to 64, and 25.3% who were 65 years of age or older. The median age was 42 years. For every 100 females, there were 74.0 males. For every 100 females age 18 and over, there were 74.0 males.

As of 2000 the median income for a household in the village was $28,636, and the median income for a family was $35,156. Males had a median income of $25,893 versus $18,958 for females. The per capita income for the village was $14,466. About 11.3% of families and 13.9% of the population were below the poverty line, including 19.7% of those under age 18 and 7.4% of those age 65 or over.

== Education ==
It is in Boyd County Public Schools, established in June 2017. It was previously in West Boyd Schools, which was established in a merger in July 2007.
