= Butte, Nebraska =

Village in Nebraska, United States

- Village
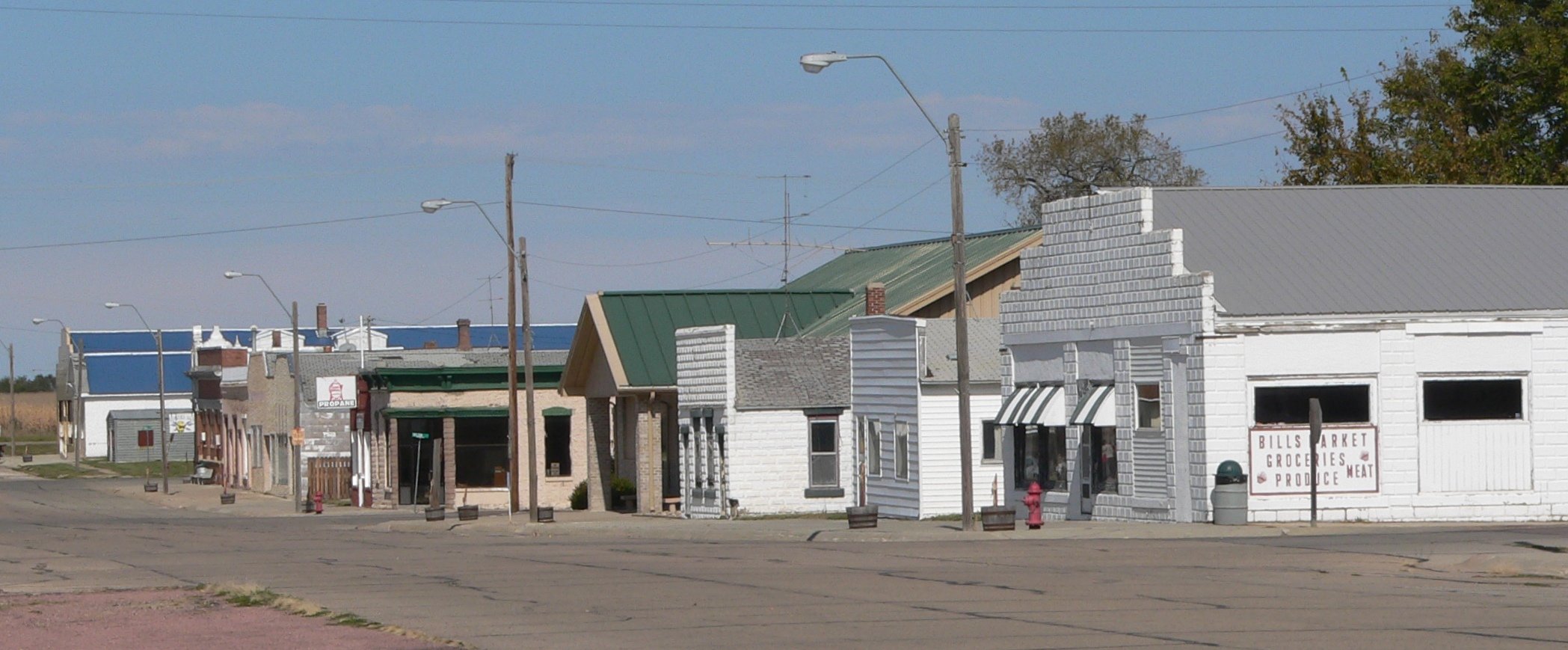
- Downtown Butte (2010)

- Location of Butte within County and State
- Coordinates: 42°54′47″N 98°50′51″W
- Country: United States
- State: Nebraska
- County: Boyd

Area
  - Total: 0.47 sq mi (1.22 km^{2})
  - Land: 0.47 sq mi (1.22 km^{2})
  - Water: 0 sq mi (0.00 km^{2})
- Elevation: 1,808 ft (551 m)

Population (2020)
  - Total: 286
  - Density: 608.2/sq mi (234.81/km^{2})
- Time zone: UTC-6 (Central (CST))
  - Summer (DST): UTC-5 (CDT)
- ZIP code: 68722
- Area code: 402
- FIPS code: 31-07485
- GNIS ID: 2397514
- Website: villageofbutte.com

Butte is a village in and the county seat of Boyd County, Nebraska, United States. Its population was 286 according to the 2020 census, down from 326 in 2010.

== History ==
Butte was named from the small hills, or buttes, near the town site.

The Central Interstate Low Level Radioactive Waste Compact and US Ecology purchased land two miles west of Butte in the early 1990s. The land was to become the site of the compact's dump; however, following extensive controversy, the dump was eventually removed from consideration. Nebraska was officially removed from the compact after a series of long court battles that ended in 2004. The state of Nebraska had to pay a settlement and there have been attempts made to sell the compact's land just outside Butte.

== Geography ==
According to the United States Census Bureau, the village has a total area of 0.42 square miles (1.09 km^{2}), all land.

=== Climate ===
This climatic region is typified by large seasonal temperature differences, with warm to hot (and often humid) summers and cold (sometimes severely cold) winters. According to the Köppen Climate Classification system, Butte has a humid continental climate, abbreviated "Dfa" on climate maps.

Climate data for Butte, Nebraska (1991–2020 normals, extremes 1907–present)
Month	Jan	Feb	Mar	Apr	May	Jun	Jul	Aug	Sep	Oct	Nov	Dec	Year
Record high °F (°C)	71 (22)	78 (26)	94 (34)	99 (37)	106 (41)	108 (42)	115 (46)	114 (46)	104 (40)	98 (37)	88 (31)	77 (25)	115 (46)
Mean maximum °F (°C)	56.9 (13.8)	61.0 (16.1)	76.0 (24.4)	83.2 (28.4)	89.2 (31.8)	94.1 (34.5)	99.2 (37.3)	97.8 (36.6)	93.4 (34.1)	85.7 (29.8)	72.8 (22.7)	57.3 (14.1)	100.6 (38.1)
Mean daily maximum °F (°C)	31.4 (−0.3)	35.5 (1.9)	47.1 (8.4)	58.0 (14.4)	69.2 (20.7)	79.6 (26.4)	85.9 (29.9)	83.8 (28.8)	76.4 (24.7)	61.8 (16.6)	46.8 (8.2)	34.0 (1.1)	59.1 (15.1)
Daily mean °F (°C)	21.1 (−6.1)	24.7 (−4.1)	35.3 (1.8)	45.8 (7.7)	57.3 (14.1)	68.0 (20.0)	74.0 (23.3)	71.8 (22.1)	63.3 (17.4)	49.3 (9.6)	35.4 (1.9)	24.4 (−4.2)	47.5 (8.6)
Mean daily minimum °F (°C)	10.8 (−11.8)	13.9 (−10.1)	23.5 (−4.7)	33.6 (0.9)	45.3 (7.4)	56.4 (13.6)	62.1 (16.7)	59.8 (15.4)	50.2 (10.1)	36.9 (2.7)	24.0 (−4.4)	14.7 (−9.6)	35.9 (2.2)
Mean minimum °F (°C)	−11.0 (−23.9)	−7.4 (−21.9)	1.6 (−16.9)	9.0 (−12.8)	31.7 (−0.2)	44.5 (6.9)	51.4 (10.8)	48.8 (9.3)	35.6 (2.0)	19.9 (−6.7)	6.0 (−14.4)	−6.7 (−21.5)	−15.7 (−26.5)
Record low °F (°C)	−35 (−37)	−31 (−35)	−24 (−31)	1 (−17)	14 (−10)	32 (0)	40 (4)	30 (−1)	19 (−7)	0 (−18)	−21 (−29)	−30 (−34)	−35 (−37)
Average precipitation inches (mm)	0.54 (14)	0.80 (20)	1.47 (37)	3.12 (79)	4.23 (107)	3.91 (99)	3.48 (88)	3.32 (84)	2.63 (67)	2.37 (60)	0.86 (22)	0.66 (17)	27.39 (696)
Average snowfall inches (cm)	6.2 (16)	6.5 (17)	5.9 (15)	5.0 (13)	0.2 (0.51)	0.0 (0.0)	0.0 (0.0)	0.0 (0.0)	0.0 (0.0)	1.1 (2.8)	4.4 (11)	6.8 (17)	36.1 (92)
Average precipitation days (≥ 0.01 in)	4.3	4.7	6.3	8.7	10.3	9.8	8.0	7.7	5.8	6.2	3.9	3.9	79.6
Average snowy days (≥ 0.1 in)	3.3	3.5	3.1	1.5	0.0	0.0	0.0	0.0	0.0	0.6	1.9	3.0	16.9
Source: NOAA

== Demographics ==
Historical population
Census	Pop.	Note	%±
1900	350		—
1910	550		57.1%
1920	593		7.8%
1930	569		−4.0%
1940	623		9.5%
1950	614		−1.4%
1960	526		−14.3%
1970	575		9.3%
1980	529		−8.0%
1990	452		−14.6%
2000	366		−19.0%
2010	326		−10.9%
2020	286		−12.3%
U.S. Decennial Census; 2012 Estimate

=== 2010 census ===
As of the census of 2010, there were 326 people, 144 households, and 83 families residing in the village. The population density was 776.2 inhabitants per square mile (299.7/km^{2}). There were 192 housing units at an average density of 457.1 per square mile (176.5/km^{2}). The racial makeup of the village was 96.0% White, 1.2% Native American, 2.5% Asian, and 0.3% from two or more races. Hispanic or Latino of any race were 0.9% of the population.

There were 144 households, of which 18.8% had children under the age of 18 living with them, 52.1% were married couples living together, 3.5% had a female householder with no husband present, 2.1% had a male householder with no wife present, and 42.4% were non-families. 39.6% of all households were made up of individuals, and 20.2% had someone living alone who was 65 years of age or older. The average household size was 2.08 and the average family size was 2.73.

The median age in the village was 51.8 years. 16.9% of residents were under the age of 18; 7% were between the ages of 18 and 24; 16.6% were from 25 to 44; 30.1% were from 45 to 64; and 29.4% were 65 years of age or older. The gender makeup of the village was 47.2% male and 52.8% female.

=== 2000 census ===
As of the census of 2000, there were 366 people, 152 households, and 81 families residing in the village. The population density was 867.6 inhabitants per square mile (335.0/km^{2}). There were 199 housing units at an average density of 471.7 per square mile (182.1/km^{2}). The racial makeup of the village was 98.91% White, 0.82% Native American, and 0.27% from two or more races.

There were 152 households, out of which 23.7% had children under the age of 18 living with them, 50.7% were married couples living together, 2.0% had a female householder with no husband present, and 46.7% were non-families. 44.7% of all households were made up of individuals, and 30.9% had someone living alone who was 65 years of age or older. The average household size was 2.11 and the average family size was 2.98.

In the village, the population was spread out, with 19.9% under the age of 18, 5.5% from 18 to 24, 18.9% from 25 to 44, 19.9% from 45 to 64, and 35.8% who were 65 years of age or older. The median age was 49 years. For every 100 females, there were 85.8 males. For every 100 females age 18 and over, there were 77.6 males.

As of 2000 the median income for a household in the village was $20,417, and the median income for a family was $35,893. Males had a median income of $23,125 versus $18,036 for females. The per capita income for the village was $14,453. About 8.2% of families and 13.5% of the population were below the poverty line, including 18.8% of those under age 18 and 11.3% of those age 65 or over.

== Education ==
It is in Boyd County Public Schools, established in June 2017. It was previously in West Boyd Schools, which was established in a merger in July 2007.

== Notable people ==
- Donald O. Clifton, an educator, psychologist, author, researcher and entrepreneur, was born in Butte in 1924. He founded Selection Research, Inc., which later acquired Gallup Inc.
- George Wagner, an American professional wrestler known as Gorgeous George, was born in Butte in 1915.
- Tim Walz, 2024 Democratic nominee for Vice President, 41st Governor of Minnesota, and former U.S. Representative from Minnesota's First District, graduated from Butte High School in 1982.
