= Morton Township, Knox County, Nebraska =

Morton Township
- Township
- Location in Knox County
- Coordinates: 42°34′10″N 097°39′18″W
- Country: United States
- State: Nebraska
- County: Knox

Area
  - Total: 35.10 sq mi (90.91 km^{2})
  - Land: 35.10 sq mi (90.91 km^{2})
  - Water: 0 sq mi (0 km^{2}) 0%
- Elevation: 1,713 ft (522 m)

Population (2020)
  - Total: 164
  - Density: 4.67/sq mi (1.80/km^{2})
- GNIS feature ID: 0838147

Morton Township is one of thirty townships in Knox County, Nebraska, United States. The population was 164 at the 2020 census. A 2023 estimate placed the township's population at 163.

== See also ==
- County government in Nebraska
