= Lynch, Nebraska =

Village in Nebraska, US

- Village
- Village of Lynch
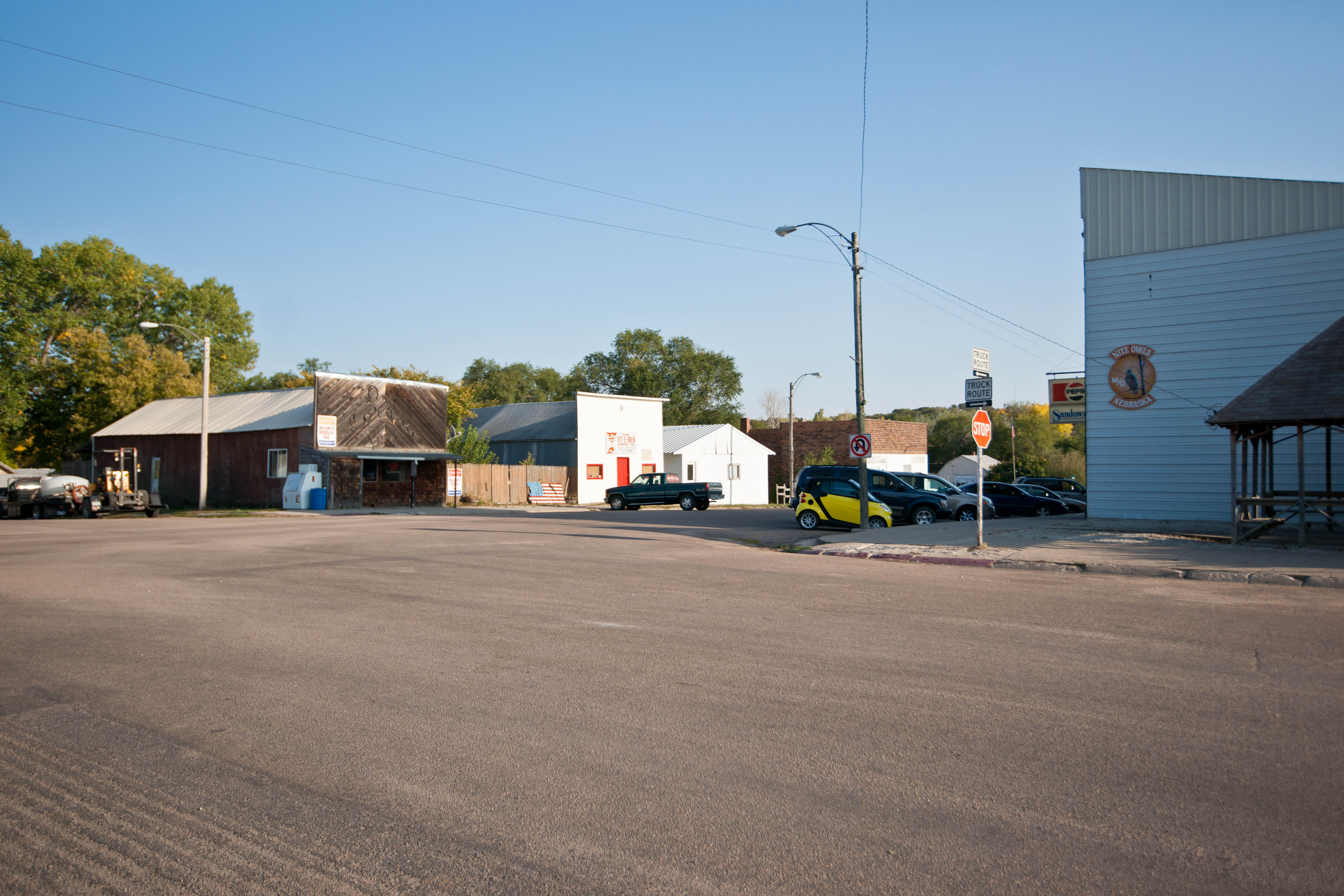
- A view of Lynch Nebraska
- Motto: "It's a beautiful day in the valley"
- Location within Boyd County
- Coordinates: 42°49′52″N 98°28′01″W
- Country: United States
- State: Nebraska
- County: Boyd

Government
  - Type: Mayor–council
  - Mayor: Jeff Hart

Area
  - Total: 0.53 sq mi (1.38 km^{2})
  - Land: 0.53 sq mi (1.38 km^{2})
  - Water: 0 sq mi (0.00 km^{2})
- Elevation: 1,411 ft (430 m)

Population (2020)
  - Total: 194
  - Density: 363.4/sq mi (140.31/km^{2})
- Time zone: UTC-6 (Central (CST))
  - Summer (DST): UTC-5 (CDT)
- ZIP code: 68746
- Area code: 402
- FIPS code: 31-29750
- GNIS feature ID: 2399206
- Website: ci.lynch.ne.us

Lynch is a village in Boyd County, Nebraska, United States. The population was 194 at the 2020 census, down from 245 in 2010. Lynch is located in northern Nebraska, between the Missouri and Niobrara rivers.

== History ==
Lynch was incorporated as a village in 1892. It was named for John Lynch, a pioneer settler.

Thirty of the one hundred homes in Lynch were destroyed by flooding in 2019.

== Government ==
Lynch, Nebraska has a mayor-council government. It holds meetings at the Village Office on the second Monday of each month. There are four trustees, one chairperson, a clerk, and a treasurer.

=== Fire department ===
The Lynch Volunteer Fire Department (LVFD), is made up of 20-25 volunteers. It provides fire protection for the town and surrounding areas as part of a mutual aid agreement.

==== Law enforcement ====
There is only one hired full-time Police Officer who is also a part-time Boyd County officer.

==== Junefest ====
Junefest is held on the third weekend of June for adults and children. There are alumni banquet activities, a parade, a walk or run, and games at the city park.

== Geography ==
According to the United States Census Bureau, the village has a total area of 0.53 square miles (1.37 km^{2}), all land.

=== Climate ===
This climatic region is typified by large seasonal temperature differences, with warm to hot (and often humid) summers and cold (sometimes severely cold) winters. According to the Köppen Climate Classification system, Lynch has a humid continental climate, abbreviated "Dfa" on climate maps.

Climate data for Lynch, Nebraska
Month	Jan	Feb	Mar	Apr	May	Jun	Jul	Aug	Sep	Oct	Nov	Dec	Year
Mean daily maximum °C (°F)	0.4 (32.8)	3.1 (37.5)	9.4 (49.0)	15.8 (60.4)	21.9 (71.5)	27.7 (81.9)	31.2 (88.1)	30.0 (86.0)	25.7 (78.3)	17.9 (64.2)	9.5 (49.1)	2.3 (36.2)	16.3 (61.3)
Daily mean °C (°F)	−6.6 (20.1)	−4.4 (24.1)	1.8 (35.3)	8.1 (46.5)	14.6 (58.2)	20.7 (69.2)	23.9 (75.0)	22.6 (72.6)	17.6 (63.6)	9.6 (49.3)	1.8 (35.2)	−4.6 (23.8)	8.8 (47.7)
Mean daily minimum °C (°F)	−13.7 (7.4)	−11.8 (10.8)	−5.7 (21.7)	0.4 (32.7)	7.2 (45.0)	13.6 (56.4)	16.6 (61.9)	15.2 (59.3)	9.4 (49.0)	1.3 (34.4)	−5.9 (21.3)	−11.5 (11.3)	1.3 (34.3)
Average precipitation mm (inches)	13 (0.5)	20 (0.8)	38 (1.5)	69 (2.7)	86 (3.4)	94 (3.7)	76 (3)	71 (2.8)	58 (2.3)	43 (1.7)	20 (0.8)	15 (0.6)	600 (23.7)
Average snowfall cm (inches)	14.2 (5.6)	17.5 (6.9)	17 (6.7)	5.6 (2.2)	0 (0)	0 (0)	0 (0)	0 (0)	0 (0)	1.5 (0.6)	10.4 (4.1)	15 (5.9)	81.2 (32)
Average precipitation days	4	4	6	7	9	9	7	7	6	5	4	4	72
Average snowy days	2.9	2.3	2.8	0.9	0	0	0	0	0	0.3	2	2.5	13.7
Source 1: NOAA(temperatures 1991-2020)
Source 2: Weatherbase(precipitation - snow)

== Demographics ==
Historical population
Census	Pop.	Note	%±
1900	231		—
1910	583		152.4%
1920	589		1.0%
1930	498		−15.4%
1940	487		−2.2%
1950	440		−9.7%
1960	409		−7.0%
1970	375		−8.3%
1980	357		−4.8%
1990	296		−17.1%
2000	269		−9.1%
2010	245		−8.9%
2020	194		−20.8%
U.S. Decennial Census

=== 2020 census ===
As of the 2020 census, there was a population of 194 and 144 households. The population density was 462.3 inhabitants per square mile (178.5/km^{2}). There were 190 housing units at an average density of 337.7 units per square mile (130.4 units/km^{2}). The racial makeup of the village was 99% White. Only two of all the residents are of any race.

22% of the village has a bachelor's degree education or higher, and the village has a 57% employment rate. 13% of the residents in the village do not have health care coverage. The Median Household income is $38,250.

=== 2000 census ===
As of the 2000 census, there were 269 people, 131 households, and 78 families residing in the village. The population density was 476.2 inhabitants per square mile (183.9/km^{2}). There were 177 housing units at an average density of 313.3 units per square mile (121.0 units/km^{2}). The racial makeup of the village was 96.28% White, 1.86% Native American, 0.37% Asian, and 1.49% from two or more races.

There were 131 households, out of which 18.3% had children under the age of 18 living with them, 52.7% were married couples living together, 3.8% had a female householder with no husband present, and 39.7% were non-families. 38.2% of all households were made up of individuals, and 22.1% had someone living alone who was 65 years of age or older. The average household size was 2.05 and the average family size was 2.63.

In the village, the population was spread out, with 21.2% under the age of 18, 3.3% from 18 to 24, 15.6% from 25 to 44, 31.2% from 45 to 64, and 28.6% who were 65 years of age or older. The median age was 51 years. For every 100 females, there were 93.5 males. For every 100 females age 18 and over, there were 100.0 males.

The median income for a household in the village was $25,333, and the median income for a family was $29,792. Males had a median income of $23,571 versus $24,583 for females. The per capita income for the village was $15,702. About 5.2% of families and 11.0% of the population were below the poverty line, including 22.0% of those under the age of eighteen and 8.0% of those 65 or over.

== Education ==
The area is within Boyd County Public Schools. The area was previously within the Lynch Public Schools district. The Lynch district consolidated into the Boyd County district in June 2017.
