= 2025 Oklahoma elections =

- 2025

Elections were held in the U.S. state of Oklahoma throughout 2025 to elect officers of some municipal governments. Special elections for state legislative positions also took place.

== State legislative special elections ==
No regularly scheduled state legislative elections took place in Oklahoma. There were four special elections scheduled caused by vacancies in the Oklahoma State Legislature.

=== Senate District 8 ===
Senate District 8 special election
- May 13, 2025

Oklahoma Senate District 8
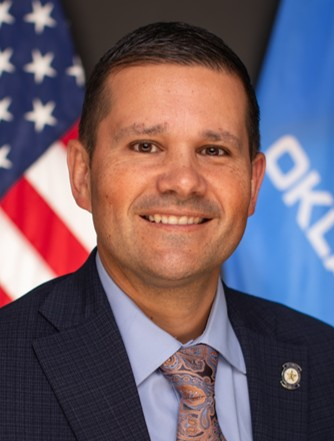

Candidate	Bryan Logan	Nathan Brewer	Steve Sanford
Party	Republican	Democratic	Independent
Popular vote	3,083	1,484	436
Percentage	61.62%	29.66%	8.71%
- Precinct results Logan: 30–40% 40–50% 50–60% 60–70% 70–80% 80–90% 90–100% Brewer: 30–40% 40–50% 50–60% 60–70% 70–80% 80–90% Tie: 30–40%
Senator before election
Roger Thompson
Republican
Elected Senator
Bryan Logan
Republican

A special election for Senate District 8 took place on May 13, 2025. The Republican primary was held on March 4 with a runoff on April 1, while the sole Democratic candidate did not face a primary. Senate District 8 represents the counties of McIntosh, Okfuskee, Okmulgee, as well as portions of Creek and Muskogee. The vacancy was caused by the resignation of Republican senator Roger Thompson in November 2024.

Senate District 8 special election
Party	Candidate	Votes	%
Republican	Bryan Logan	3,083	61.62%
Democratic	Nathan Brewer	1,484	29.66%
Independent	Steve Sanford	436	8.71%
Total votes		5,003	100.00%
Majority		1,599	31.96%
Turnout		5,003	9.72%
Registered electors		51,491	

=== House District 71 ===
House of Representatives District 71 special election
- June 10, 2025

Oklahoma House of Representatives District 71
- Turnout: 8.65% (unofficial)
Candidate	Amanda Clinton	Beverly A. Atteberry
Party	Democratic	Republican
Popular vote	1,803	326
Percentage	84.69%	15.31%
- Precinct results Clinton: 60–70% 70–80% 80–90% 90–100%
Representative before election
Amanda Swope
Democratic
Elected Representative
Amanda Clinton
Democratic

A special election for House District 71 took place on June 10, 2025. The primaries were held on April 1 with a runoff for the Republican nomination scheduled on May 13. The district covers a portion of the city of Tulsa. The vacancy was caused by the resignation of Democratic representative Amanda Swope in January 2025. Four Democrats competed in an unusually expensive primary to represent the deeply-blue district. Amanda Clinton won the primary in the first round and easily won the general election.

House of Representatives District 71 special election
Party	Candidate	Votes	%
Democratic	Amanda Clinton	1,803	84.69%
Republican	Beverly A. Atteberry	326	15.31%
Registered electors		24,626	

=== House District 74 ===
House of Representatives District 74 special election
- June 10, 2025

Oklahoma House of Representatives District 74
- Turnout: 9.65% (unofficial)
Candidate	Kevin Norwood	Amy Hossain
Party	Republican	Democratic
Popular vote	1,726	945
Percentage	64.62%	35.38%
- Precinct results Norwood: 50–60% 60–70% 70–80% 80–90%
Representative before election
Mark Vancuren
Republican
Elected Representative
Kevin Norwood
Republican

A special election for House District 74 is scheduled to take place on June 10, 2025. The Republican primary was held on April 1 with a runoff scheduled for May 13, while the sole Democratic candidate did not face a primary. House District 74 represents portions of the counties of Rogers and Tulsa. The vacancy was caused by the resignation of Republican representative Mark Vancuren in January 2025.

House of Representatives District 74 special election
Party	Candidate	Votes	%
Republican	Kevin Norwood	1,726	64.62%
Democratic	Amy Hossain	945	35.38%
Registered electors		27,688	

=== House District 97 ===
House of Representatives District 97 special Democratic primary
- June 10, 2025

Oklahoma House of Representatives District 97
- Turnout: 14.70% (unofficial)
Candidate	Aletia Timmons	JeKia Harrison
Party	Democratic	Democratic
Popular vote	1,224	848
Percentage	59.07%	40.93%
- Precinct results Timmons: 50–60% 60–70% 80–90% Harrison: 50–60% 60–70% 90–100% Tie: 50%
Representative before election
Jason Lowe
Democratic
Elected Representative
Aletia Timmons
Democratic

The special Democratic primary for House District 97 took place on June 10, 2025; because only two Democratic candidates filed for the seat, the primary decided the winner of the election. House District 97 represents a portion of Oklahoma County. The vacancy was caused by the resignation of Democratic representative Jason Lowe in April 2025.

House of Representatives District 97 special Democratic primary
Party	Candidate	Votes	%
Democratic	Aletia Timmons	1,224	59.07
Democratic	JeKia Harrison	848	40.93
Registered electors		19,485	

== Local elections ==
Municipal elections in Oklahoma are nonpartisan, while county elections are partisan.

=== Oklahoma City ===
In Oklahoma City, the state's largest city and its capital, half of the city council was up for election. The general election was on February 11, with runoffs taking place on April 1.

2025 Oklahoma City elections
First round	Results
Council 1	✓ Bradley Carter (inc.) Unopp.
Council 3	✓ Katrina Bedell Avers, 73.9%; Barbara Peck (inc.) 26.1%
Council 4	✓ Todd Stone (inc.) Unopp.
Council 7	Runoff: ✓ Camal Pennington, 64.5%; John Pettis Jr., 35.5%; First round: Camal Pennington, 45.5%; John Pettis Jr., 30.2%; Masood A. Haqq, 14.8%; Andrea Holman, 9.4%

=== Norman ===
In Norman, the state's third largest city, its mayor and odd-numbered city council districts are up for election. The general election took place on February 11. Incumbent Ward 7 councilmember Tyler Holman defeated incumbent mayor Larry Heikkila with 61.1 percent of the vote.

2025 Norman elections
Race	Results
Mayor	✓ Stephen Tyler Holman, 61.1%; Larry Heikkila (inc.) 35.0%; Riley W. Mulinix, 3.9%
Council 1	✓ David Gandesbery, 64.8%; Austin Ball (inc.) 23.8%; Drew Hooper, 11.4%
Council 3	✓ Bree Montoya (inc.) 53.7%; Sandra Artman, 46.3%
Council 5	✓ Michael Nash (inc.) 52.9%; Cindi Tuccillo, 30.5%; Trey Kirby, 16.6%
Council 7	✓ Kimberly Blodgett, 61.7%; Amanda Chaffin, 38.3%

=== Oklahoma County ===
A special election for the Oklahoma County Commission District 1 took place on April 1, with the Democratic primary on February 11. The vacancy was caused by the resignation of Democratic commissioner Carrie Blumert. Democratic nominee Jason Lowe defeated independent candidate Jed Green with 85.2 percent of the vote.

=== Other races ===
On April 1, 2025, Roger Dale Merrill was elected mayor of Beggs in Okmulgee County with 82.1 percent of the vote, making him the first mayor in the state of Oklahoma to be a member of the Libertarian Party.
