= Logan =

Logan may refer to:

== Places ==
- Mount Logan (disambiguation)

=== Australia ===
- Logan (Queensland electoral district), an electoral district in the Queensland Legislative Assembly
- Logan, Victoria, small locality near St. Arnaud
- Logan City, local government area in Queensland
  - Shire of Logan, predecessor to Logan City
- Logan Lagoon, Flinders Island, Tasmania
- Logan River, river flowing into Moreton Bay, Queensland
- Logan Village, Queensland, a town and locality within Logan City, Queensland

=== Canada ===
- Mount Logan, Canada's highest mountain
- Logan (Manitoba electoral district), former electoral district in the Canadian province of Manitoba
- Logan Lake, a district municipality in the Southern Interior of British Columbia

=== United Kingdom ===
- Logan Botanic Garden, Wigtownshire, Scotland
- Logan, East Ayrshire, Scotland

=== United States ===
- Logan, Alabama
- Logan, Arkansas
- Logan, Edgar County, Illinois
- Logan Square, Chicago, Illinois
- Logan, Dearborn County, Indiana
- Logan, Iowa
- Logan, Kansas
- Logan International Airport, Boston, Massachusetts
- Logan, Greene County, Missouri
- Logan, Lawrence County, Missouri
- Logan, Montana
- Logan Pass, pass in Glacier National Park, Montana
- Billings Logan International Airport, Billings, Montana
- Logan, Michigan, the original name of Adrian, Michigan
- The Logan, a historic building in Omaha, Nebraska
- Logan, New Mexico
- Logan, North Dakota
- Logan, Ohio
- Logan, Oklahoma
- Logan, Oregon
- Logan, Philadelphia, Pennsylvania, a neighborhood
- Logan Run, a tributary of the Susquehanna River in Northumberland County, Pennsylvania
- Logan, Utah
- Logan Peak, mountain near Cache Valley, Utah
- Logan Canyon, mountain canyon in northern Utah
- Logan, West Virginia
- Logan, Wisconsin
- Logan County (disambiguation)
- Logan River (Utah-Idaho)
- Logan Township (disambiguation)

== People ==
- Logan (given name), including a list of people and fictional characters
- Logan (surname)
  - General Logan (disambiguation)
  - Senator Logan (disambiguation)
- Clan Logan, a Scottish clan
- Logan (Iroquois leader) (c. 1723?–1780), Native American orator and war leader
- Captain Logan (c. 1776 – 1812), Shawnee warrior also known as Logan or Spemica Lawba

=== Fictional characters ===
- Logan (X-Men film series character)
- "Big Hat" Logan, is a character from the video game Dark Souls (video game)

== Arts and entertainment ==
- Logan (album), a 2021 Album by South African Rapper Emtee
- Logan (band), a rock band from Glasgow, Scotland
- Logan (film), a 2017 American film featuring the Marvel Comics character Wolverine
- Logan (novel), an 1822 novel by American writer John Neal

== Geology ==
- Logan Medal, an award given to Canadian geologists for outstanding contribution to the field
- Logan Rock, a rocking stone found in Cornwall, United Kingdom
- Rocking stones, also known as logan stones, large stones that are carefully balanced so as to move with the slightest touch
- Logan or pokelogan, a shallow, swampy lake or pond

== Vehicles ==
- Logan (automobile), an American car produced in Ohio 1903–1908
- Logan (cyclecar), an American car produced in Chicago 1914
- Dacia Logan, a low cost automobile produced by Renault and Dacia

== Other uses ==
- Logan (magazine), an American bimonthly for young people with disabilities
- Logan, a 2-row barley variety

== See also ==
- Logan Act, a United States law forbidding private citizens from negotiating with foreign governments
- Logan v. Zimmerman Brush Co., a U.S. Supreme Court decision on the right to due process of law
- Logan's Roadhouse, an American restaurant chain
- Longan, a southeast Asian fruit sometimes misspelled “Logan”
- Loganville (disambiguation)
- Logansport (disambiguation)
