= Senator Ballenger =

Senator Ballenger may refer to:

- Bill Ballenger (born 1941), Michigan State Senate
- Cass Ballenger (1926–2015), North Carolina State Senate
- Roger Ballenger (1950–2019), Oklahoma State Senate
