= Logan metropolitan area (disambiguation) =

The Logan metropolitan area is the metropolitan area encompassing Logan, Utah, United States.

The Logan metropolitan area may refer to:

- The Logan, West Virginia micropolitan area, United States

== See also ==
- Logan (disambiguation)
