= Logan Township, Michigan =

Logan Township is the name of some places in the U.S. state of Michigan:

- Logan Township, Mason County, Michigan
- Logan Township, Ogemaw County, Michigan
- Adrian Township, Michigan in Lenawee County was originally named Logan Township

A few places in Michigan were once named Logan:

- The original plat for Adrian, Michigan was recorded under the name of "Logan"
- A community in Bowne Township, Michigan in Kent County had a post office named "Logan", 1884-1888 and 1899-1906
- A community in Livingston Township, Michigan in Otsego County had a post office named "Logan", 1880-1883

== See also ==
- Logan Township (disambiguation)
