= Roger Thompson =

Roger Thompson may refer to:

- Roger Thompson (soccer)
- Roger Thompson (politician)
