= Mount Logan (disambiguation) =

Mount Logan is the highest mountain in Canada.

Mount Logan may also refer to:

== Canada ==
- Mount Logan (Quebec)

== United States ==
- Mount Logan (Arizona), a mountain of Arizona by height
- Mount Logan (Garfield County, Colorado)
- Mount Logan Foothills, an Area of Critical Environmental Concern in Colorado
- Mount Logan (Montana)
- Mount Logan (Ohio), depicted on the Seal of Ohio
- Logan Peak, or Mount Logan, Utah
- Mount Logan (Washington)
- Mount Logan Wilderness, Arizona

== See also ==
- Logan Glacier (Alaska)
- Logan (disambiguation)
