= Logan Township, Minnesota =

Logan Township is the name of some places in the U.S. state of Minnesota:

- Logan Township, Aitkin County, Minnesota
- Logan Township, Grant County, Minnesota

== See also ==
- Logan Township (disambiguation)
