= Frank Shurden =

American politician

Member of the Oklahoma Senate from the 8th district
- In office November 1986 – November 16, 2006
- Preceded by: John Luton
- Succeeded by: Roger Ballenger

Member of the Oklahoma House of Representatives from the 16th district
- In office November 1978 – November 1986
- Preceded by: Joseph Bennett
- Succeeded by: M. C. Leist

Personal details
- Born: October 8, 1940 (age 85) Henryetta, Oklahoma
- Party: Democratic

Frank Shurden (born October 8, 1940) is an American politician who served in the Oklahoma House of Representatives from the 16th district from 1978 to 1986 and in the Oklahoma Senate from the 8th district from 1986 to 2006.
