= Logan County =

Logan County is the name of ten current counties and one former county in the United States:

- Logan County, Arkansas
- Logan County, Colorado
- Logan County, Idaho (1889–1895)
- Logan County, Illinois
- Logan County, Kansas
- Logan County, Kentucky
- Logan County, Nebraska
- Logan County, North Dakota
- Logan County, Ohio
- Logan County, Oklahoma
- Logan County, West Virginia

== See also ==
- Logan Shire, Queensland, Australia; predecessor to Logan City
- Logan Township (disambiguation)
- Logan (disambiguation)
