= Senator Logan =

Senator Logan may refer to:

== Members of the United States Senate ==
- Charles Logan (24), fictional U.S. Senator in the television series 24
- George Logan (Pennsylvania politician) (1753–1821), U.S. Senator from Pennsylvania
- John A. Logan (1826–1886), U.S. Senator from Illinois from 1879 to 1886
- M. M. Logan (1874–1939), U.S. Senator from Kentucky
- William Logan (politician) (1776–1822), U.S. Senator from Kentucky

== United States state senate members ==
- Bryan Logan (fl. 2020s), Oklahoma State Senate
- Edward Lawrence Logan (1875–1939), Massachusetts State Senate
- George Logan (Connecticut politician) (born 1969), Connecticut State Senate
- Henry Logan (politician) (1784–1866), Pennsylvania State Senate
- John Logan (pioneer) (1747–1807), Kentucky State Senate
- Sean Logan (born 1970), Pennsylvania State Senate
- W. H. Logan (fl. 1880s), Arkansas State Senate
