= Bruce Niemi =

American politician (1949–2025)

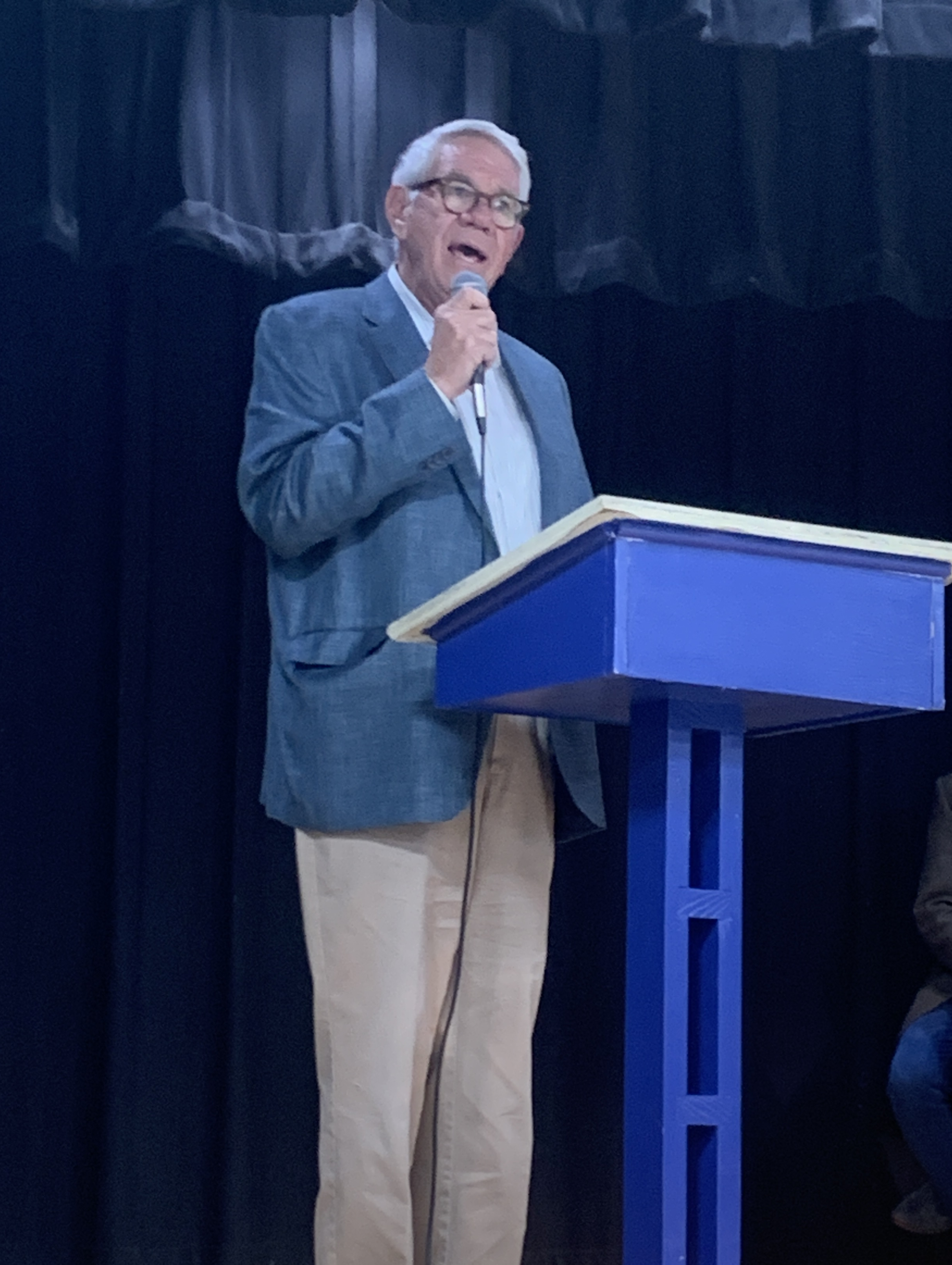
- Niemi speaking in 2025

Chairman of the Tulsa County Democratic Party
- In office 2022 – May 2025
- Preceded by: Amanda Swope
- Succeeded by: Sarah Gray

Member of the Oklahoma House of Representatives from the 78th district
- In office 1991–1993
- Preceded by: Frank F. Pitezel
- Succeeded by: Flint Breckinridge

Personal details
- Born: April 24, 1949 Tulsa, Oklahoma, U.S.
- Died: December 1, 2025 (aged 76)
- Political party: Democratic
- Education: University of Oklahoma

Bruce Niemi (April 24, 1949 – December 1, 2025) was an American politician who served in the Oklahoma House of Representatives from 1991 to 1993.

== Life and career ==
Bruce Niemi was born in Tulsa, Oklahoma, on April 24, 1949, to Kathlyn Elizabeth Korten and Edward Touri Niemi. He attended Bishop Kelley High School and graduated from Edison Preparatory School in 1967. He later graduated from the University of Oklahoma with a bachelor's degree and Oklahoma State University with a master's and PhD in education. He also completed the University of the South's education for ministry program.

He worked as a political science teacher at Tulsa Community College and ran for the Oklahoma House of Representatives in 1990 as a member of the Democratic Party. He was elected and served in the 43rd Oklahoma Legislature from 1991 to 1993. After leaving the legislature, he worked as the president of Oklahoma Industrial Hemp Foundation and served on the Tulsa County Election Board. He also served as the chair of the Tulsa County Democratic Party from 2022 to 2025.

In December 2024, Niemi announced his candidacy for the Oklahoma House 71st district special election to succeed Amanda Swope. He did not file to run.

== Personal life and death ==
Niemi married Tulsa County special district judge Theresa Dreiling and the couple had two children. He died on December 1, 2025, at the age of 76.
