= Denise Brewer =

American politician (born 1966)

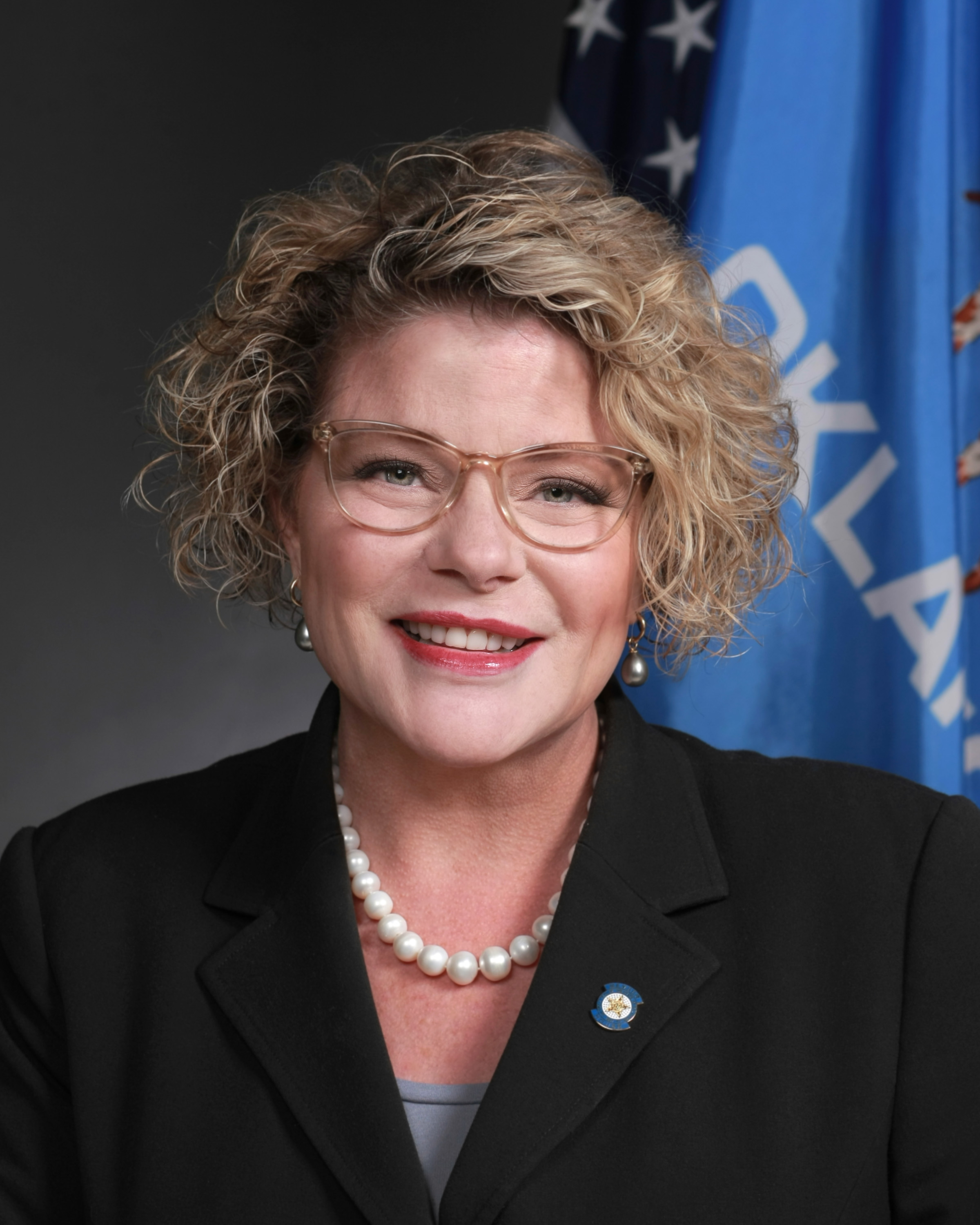

Member of the Oklahoma House of Representatives from the 71st district
- In office November 15, 2018 – November 16, 2022
- Preceded by: Katie Henke
- Succeeded by: Amanda Swope

Personal details
- Born: March 30, 1966 (age 60) Tachikawa, Tokyo, Japan
- Party: Democratic

Denise Brewer (born March 30, 1966) is an American politician who served in the Oklahoma House of Representatives from the 71st district from 2018 to 2022. Brewer was the first Democrat elected to the OK House from her district in 60 years. The seat has been held by Democrats ever since. She announced she would not seek reelection at the end of the 2022 term due to Long Covid .

Brewer participated in the 2018 Teacher walkout protests and focused much of her legislation on empowering victims of Domestic Violence, improving OK education, protecting Civil Rights and promoting Green Energy.

Brewer received numerous awards. She stated that being named the Legislative Leader for Child Advocacy (2018-2022) by the Oklahoma Institute for Child Advocacy as her most treasured achievements aside from raising her 3 children.

Brewer, a survivor of domestic violence and child abuse herself, has an ACE (Adverse Childhood Experiences) score of 10 out of 10. She’s dedicated much of her career to raising awareness and helping other victims by sharing her experiences.

Prior to her election, Denise Brewer was an award winning broadcast journalist for 25 years who studied at the prestigious Poynter Institute for Media Studies, a successful entrepreneur and public speaker. As a journalist, she, and co-anchor Jay Rickerts, increased ratings at the local NBC affiliate to the highest levels ever recorded before and since. After being called “too newsy” and “not deferential enough to men on set”, her contract was not renewed. In a lawsuit brought by Brewer, the station settled for an undisclosed amount.

Brewer’s been lauded by the Tulsa community for her advocacy and fundraising efforts: helping non-profits raise millions of dollars.
