= Roger Ballenger =

American politician (1950–2019)

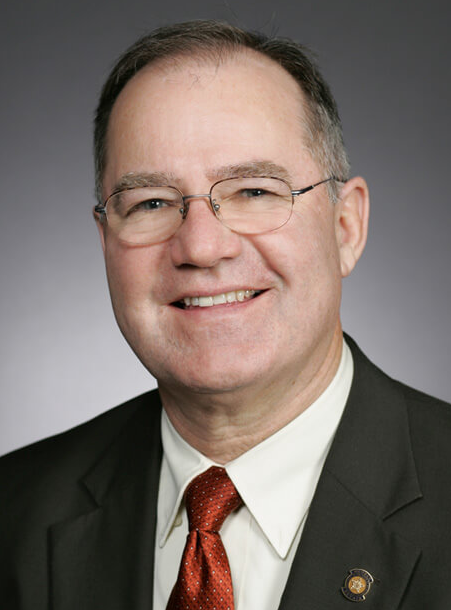

Member of the Oklahoma Senate from the 8th district
- In office November 16, 2006 – November 18, 2014
- Preceded by: Frank Shurden
- Succeeded by: Roger Thompson

Personal details
- Born: September 25, 1950 Okmulgee, Oklahoma, U.S.
- Died: October 27, 2019 (aged 69) Okmulgee, Oklahoma, U.S.
- Party: Democratic
- Education: OSU Institute of Technology of Okmulgee
- Occupation: electrical contractor, rancher

Roger Ballenger (September 25, 1950 – October 27, 2019) was an American politician. He served in the Oklahoma Senate, representing district 8, which includes McIntosh, Okfuskee, Okmulgee and Tulsa counties, from 2006 to 2014.

He died of melanoma on October 27, 2019, in Okmulgee, Oklahoma at age 69.
