= Kevin Wayne Norwood =

American politician

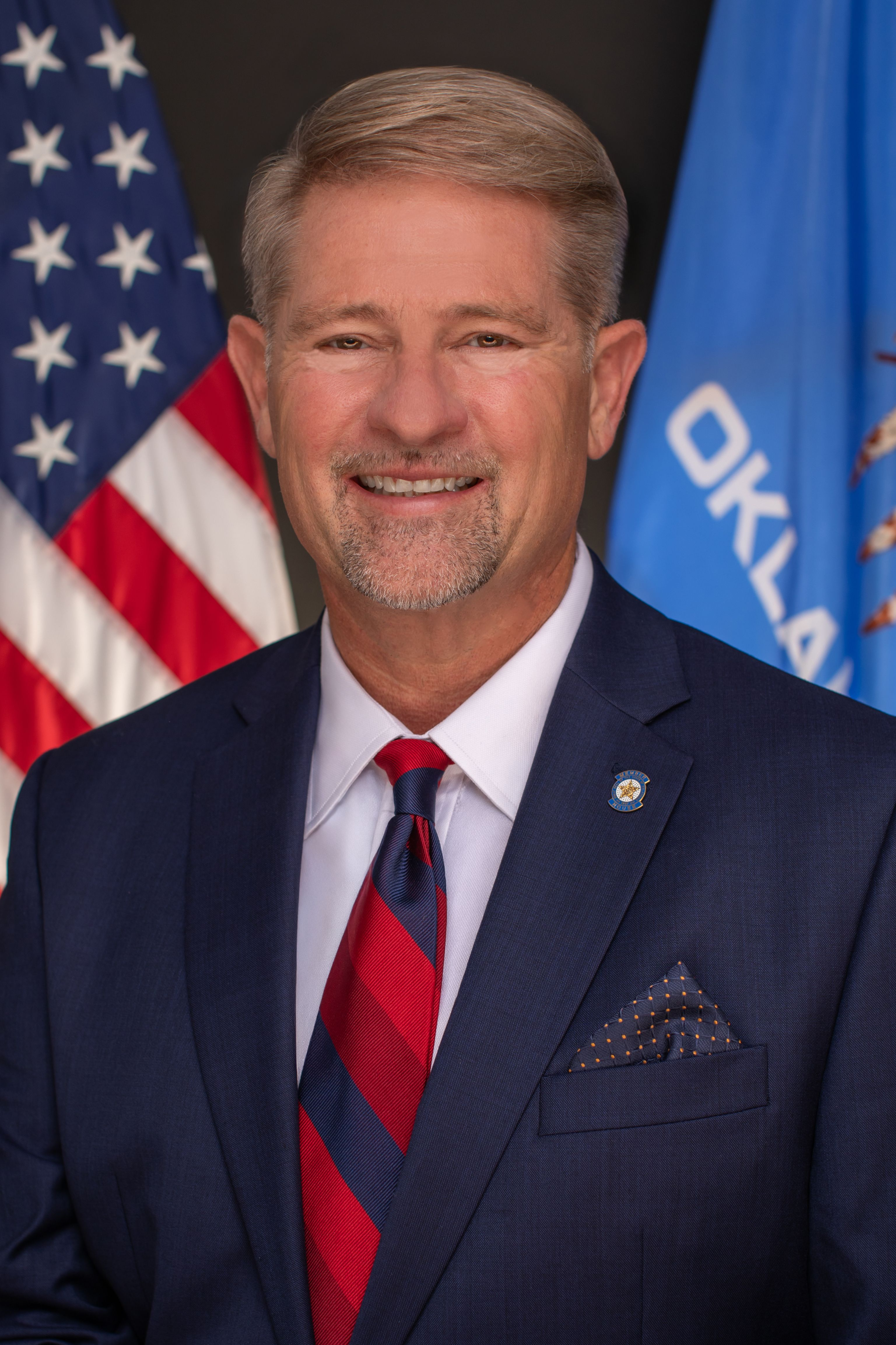
- Norwood in 2025

Member of the Oklahoma House of Representatives from the 74th district
- Incumbent
- Assumed office June 18, 2025
- Preceded by: Mark Vancuren

Personal details
- Born: Muskogee, Oklahoma, U.S.
- Party: Republican
- Education: Southwestern Christian University; Oral Roberts University; George Fox University

Kevin Wayne Norwood is an American politician who has served as the member for the 74th district of the Oklahoma House of Representatives since 2025.

== Biography ==
Kevin Wayne Norwood was born and raised in Muskogee, Oklahoma. He earned a Bachelor's degree from Southwestern Christian University, Master's degree from Oral Roberts University, and a doctorate from George Fox University. Norwood started his career in 1987 as the youth minister for Lakeside Assembly in Oklahoma City before moving to Owasso in 1994 to continue to work as a youth minister.

== Oklahoma House of Representatives ==
Norwood was among six candidates who filed to succeed Mark Vancuren in representing the 74th district of the Oklahoma House of Representatives. Norwood advanced to a Republican primary runoff alongside Sheila Vancuren, the wife of the outgoing representative, and narrowly won the runoff. He won the June general election, defeating Democratic candidate Amy Hossain. He was sworn in on June 18.

== Political positions ==
The Tulsa World described Norwood as an "evangelist."
