= Amanda Swope =

American politician

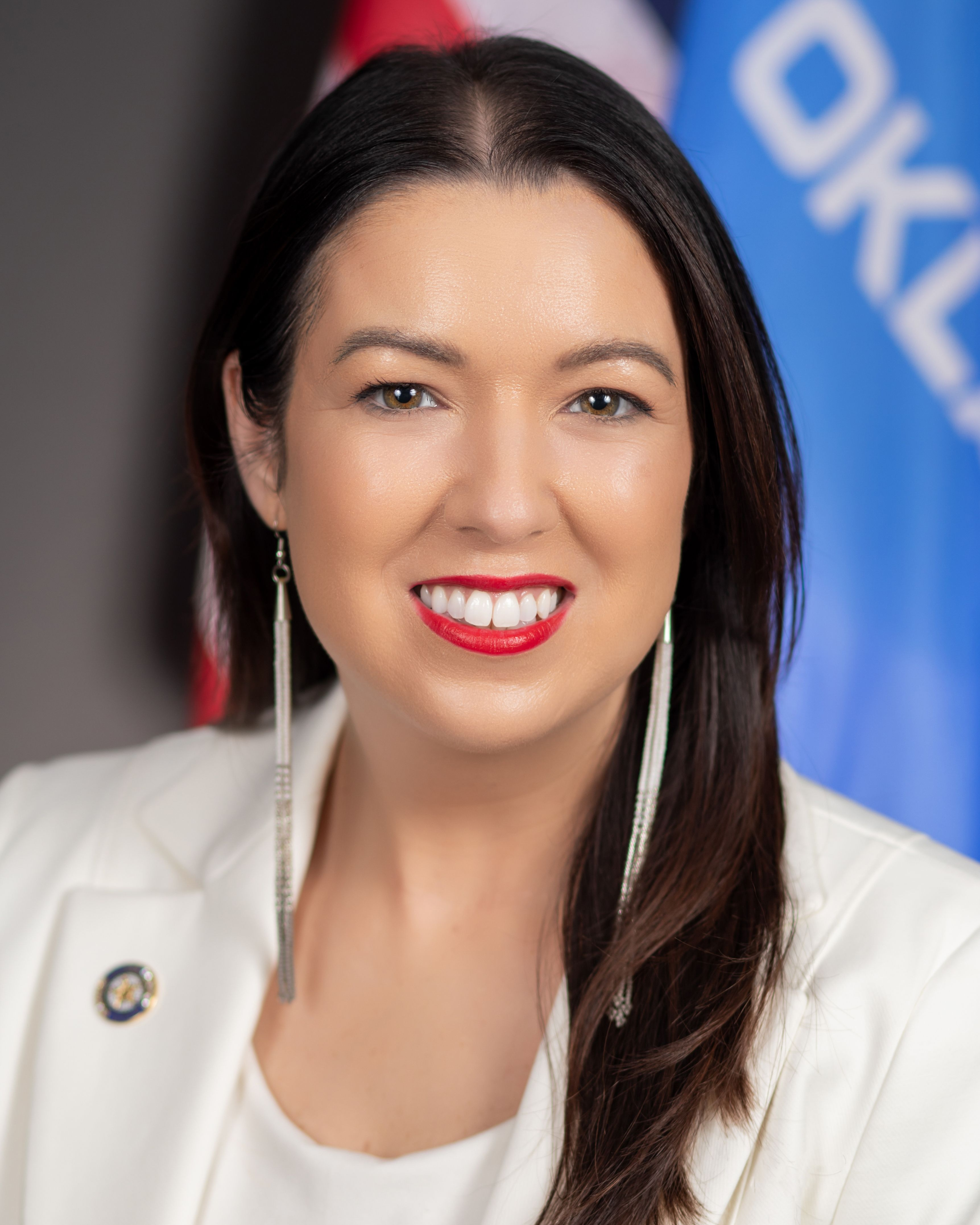
- Swope in 2022

Tulsa Director of Tribal Policy & Partnership
- Incumbent
- Assumed office January 29, 2025
- Appointed by: Monroe Nichols
- Preceded by: Position established

Member of the Oklahoma House of Representatives from the 71st district
- In office November 16, 2022 – January 28, 2025
- Preceded by: Denise Brewer
- Succeeded by: Amanda Clinton

Chairwoman of the Tulsa County Democratic Party
- In office 2019–2022
- Succeeded by: Bruce Niemi

Personal details
- Born: February 5, 1988 (age 38) Tulsa, Oklahoma, U.S.
- Citizenship: American; Muscogee Nation
- Party: Democratic
- Education: Northeastern State University (BA); University of Oklahoma (MPA)

Amanda Swope is an American and Muscogee politician who served as the Oklahoma House of Representatives member from the 71st district from 2022 to 2025. She was the Tulsa County Democratic Party Chairwoman between 2019 and 2022, the youngest person and first Native American to hold the position.

She is a citizen of the Muscogee Nation and, in January 2025 assumed the role of Director of Tribal Policy & Partnership in the administration of Tulsa Mayor Monroe Nichols.

== Early life and education ==
Amanda Swope was born and raised in Tulsa where she graduated from Nathan Hale High School in 2006. Her mother is former Tulsa City Councilor Connie Dodson. She earned her bachelor's degree in psychology from Northeastern State University and her master's degree in public administration from the University of Oklahoma.

== Career ==
Swope worked in the nonprofit sector before accepting a job for the Muscogee Nation in 2018. She became the tribal juvenile justice program director for the Muscogee Nation in 2021.

== Tulsa County Democratic Party ==
Swope started volunteering with the Tulsa County Democratic Party in 2011. She served as the Chairwoman of the Tulsa County Democratic Party from 2019 to 2022. She was the youngest person and first Native American to hold the seat. She also worked on Drew Edmondson's campaign for governor in 2018.

== Oklahoma House of Representatives ==
Swope filed to run for Oklahoma House of Representatives 71st district to succeed Representative Denise Brewer in 2022. She faced no other Democratic candidates in the primary and Republican Mike Masters in the general election. She was endorsed by the Tulsa World and received campaign contributions from the Cherokee Nation. She defeated Masters with over 60% of the vote. She was sworn in on November 16, 2022. During her tenure she served on the Elections and Ethics Committee, Administrative Rules Committee, State Powers Committee, Rules Committee, and Public Safety Appropriations and Budget Committee.

Swope ran for reelection unopposed in 2024. That December, she announced she would resign to serve as Tulsa's director of tribal policy and partnerships starting January 29, 2025, in Mayor Monroe Nichols' administration.

== Personal life ==
Swope is a citizen of the Muscogee Nation and of Osage descent.
