= General Logan (disambiguation) =

Edward Lawrence Logan (1875–1939) was a U.S. Army major general. General Logan may also refer to:

- Arthur J. Logan (fl. 1980s–2020s), U.S. Army major general
- John A. Logan (1826–1886), Union Army major general
- Thomas M. Logan (1840–1914), Confederate States Army brigadier general
