= Logansport =

Logansport is the name of some places in the United States:

- Logansport, Indiana
- Logansport, Louisiana
- Logansport, West Virginia
