= Amanda Clinton =

American and Cherokee politician

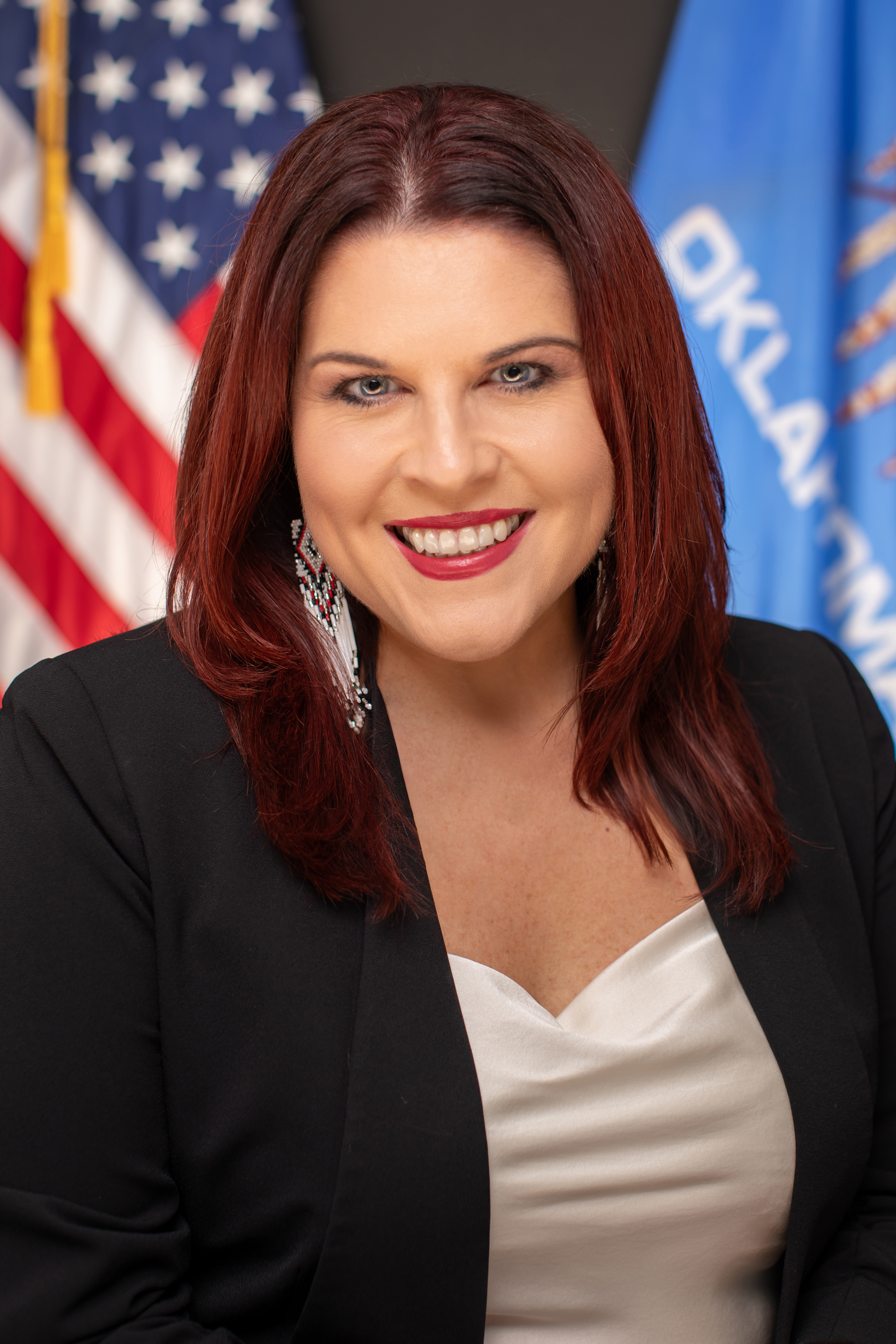
- Clinton in 2025

Member of the Oklahoma House of Representatives from the 71st district
- Incumbent
- Assumed office June 18, 2025
- Preceded by: Amanda Swope

Personal details
- Born: 1978 or 1979 (age 47–48) Tahlequah, Oklahoma, U.S.
- Citizenship: American; Cherokee Nation
- Party: Democratic
- Education: University of Oklahoma; Oklahoma State University (BA, MA)

Amanda Rachelle Clinton (born 1978/1979) is an American and Cherokee politician who has served as the representative for the 71st district of the Oklahoma House of Representatives since 2025.

== Early life, education, and career ==
Amanda Clinton is a Cherokee Nation citizen and was born in Tahlequah, Oklahoma. She was raised near Rose. She attended Kenwood Elementary School and Locust Grove High School before attending the University of Oklahoma for a year. She later transferred to Oklahoma State University where she earned a Bachelor's and Master's degree.

Clinton started her career in journalism, working for KTKA in Topeka, Kansas before quickly moving to KTUL in Tulsa. In 2005, she started working for Cherokee Nation Businesses. In 2012, she became the vice president of communications for both the Cherokee Nation and Cherokee Nation Businesses. In 2018, she participated in the 2018 Oklahoma Teacher walkout.

In 2020, she started an independent consulting firm. Prior to her election, she served on the board of the Oklahoma Hall of Fame and the Tulsa Local News Initiative. During the 2024 Tulsa mayoral election, she worked as the communications director for Monroe Nichols.

== Oklahoma House of Representatives ==
In January 2025, Clinton was among seven candidates who filed to succeed Amanda Swope in representing the 71st district of the Oklahoma House of Representatives. Clinton was endorsed by Monroe Nichols and Kathy Taylor in the Democratic Party primary. She won the May primary with over 50 percent of the vote, avoiding a runoff election. She was endorsed in the general election by the Tulsa World. She defeated the Republican nominee Beverly Atteberry in the June general election. She was sworn in on June 18.

== See also ==
- List of Native American politicians
- Native American women in politics
