= Logan (automobile) =

Defunct American motor vehicle manufacturer

The Logan Construction Company
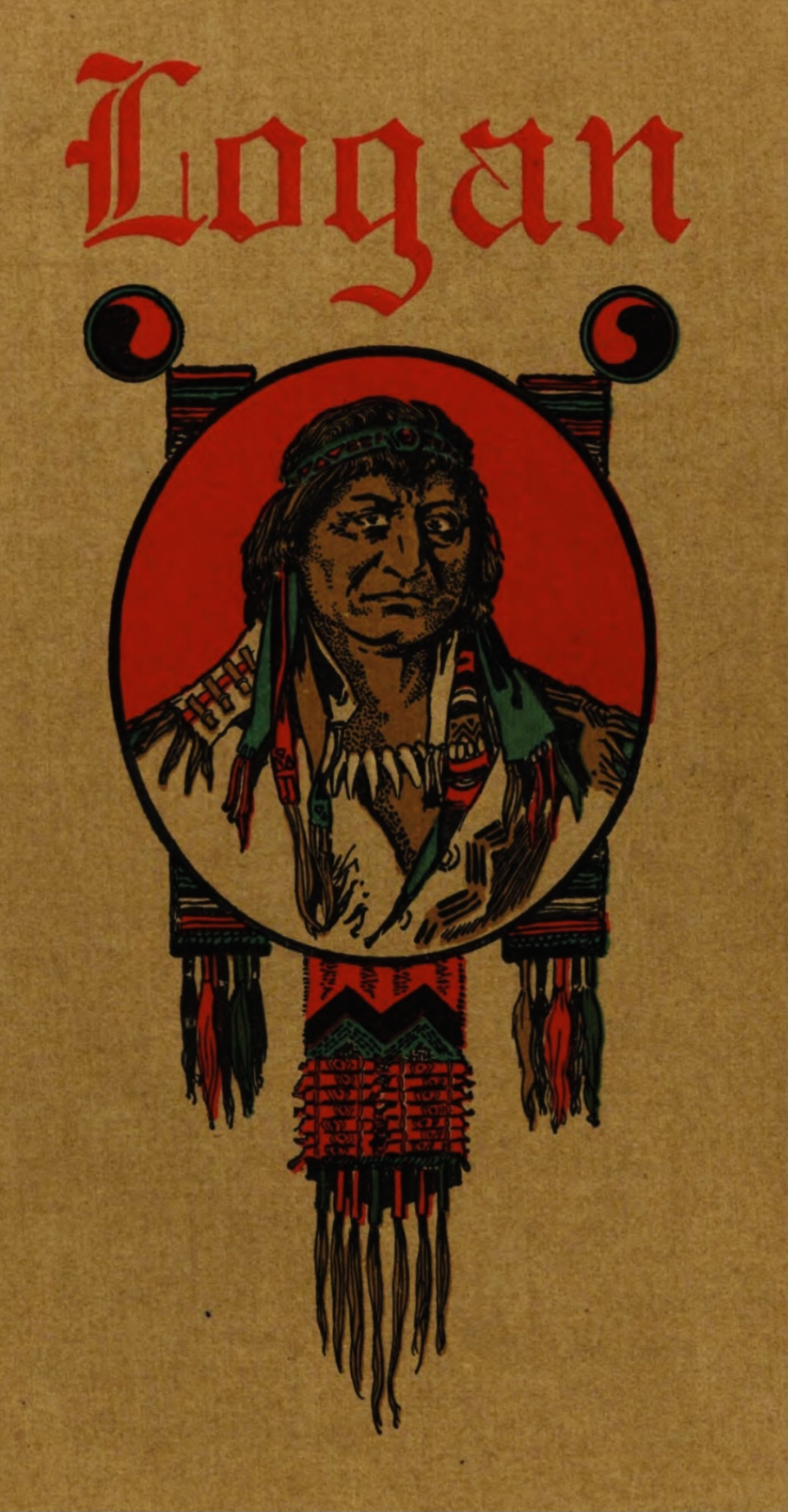
- "That Car of Quality"
- Type: Automobile Manufacturing
- Industry: Automotive
- Genre: Touring Cars and Commercial Cars
- Founded: 1903; 123 years ago
- Founder: Benjamin A. Gramm
- Defunct: 1908; 118 years ago
- Fate: Bankruptcy
- Successor: Gramm-Logan Motor Car Company
- Headquarters: Chillicothe, Ohio, United States
- Area served: United States
- Products: Vehicles; Automotive parts

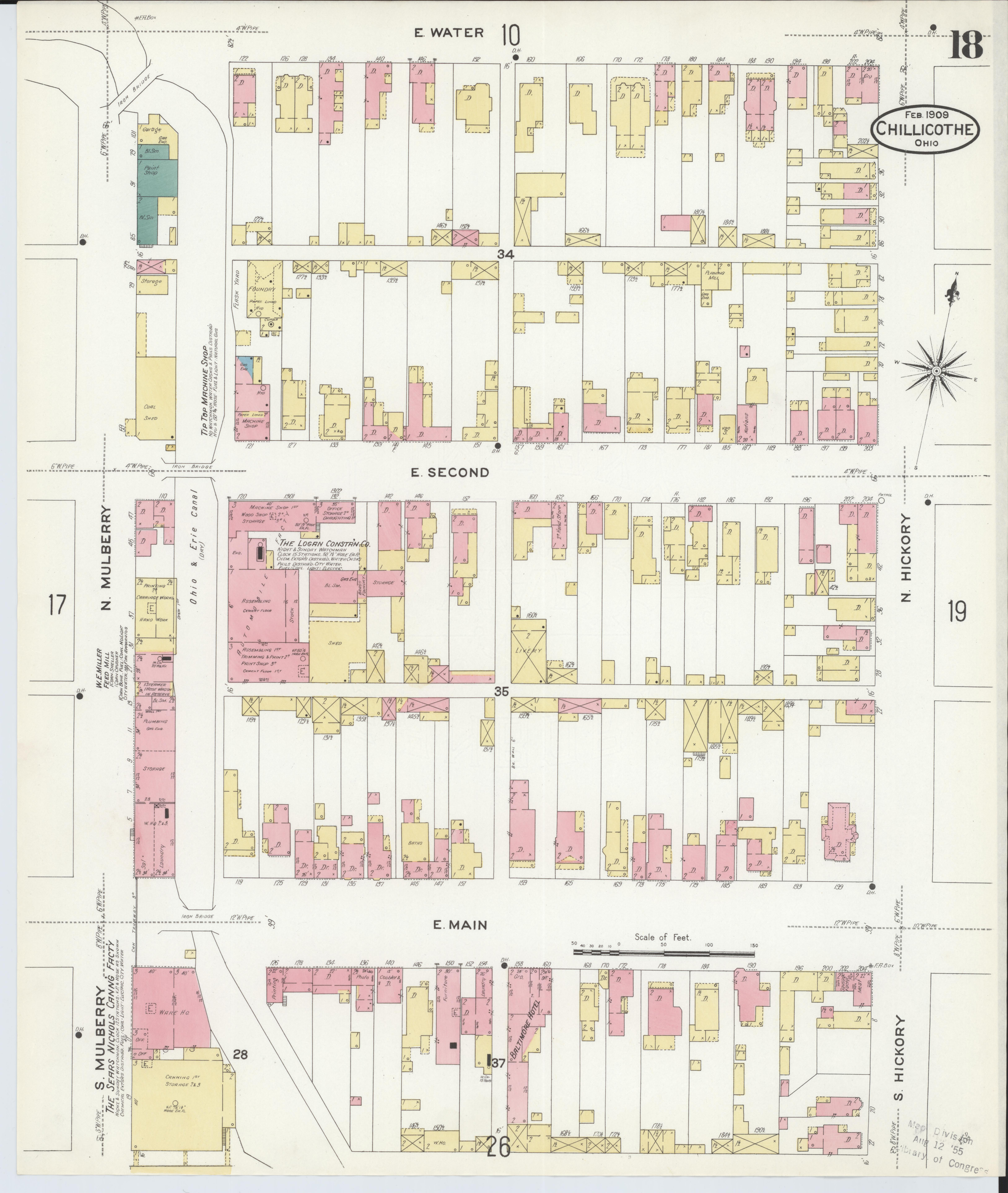
Logan Plant (1908)

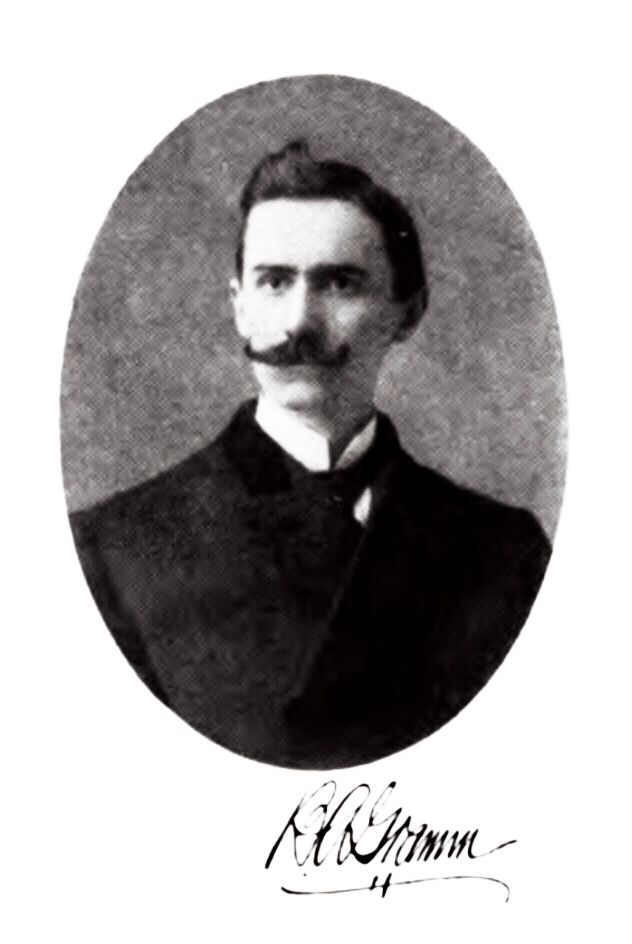
Benjamin A. Gramm.

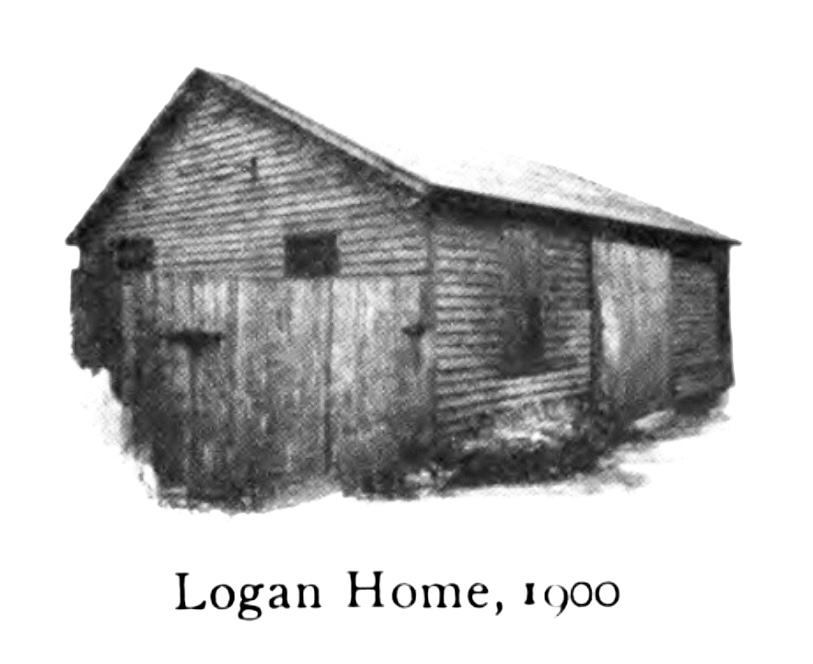
Logan shed (1900).

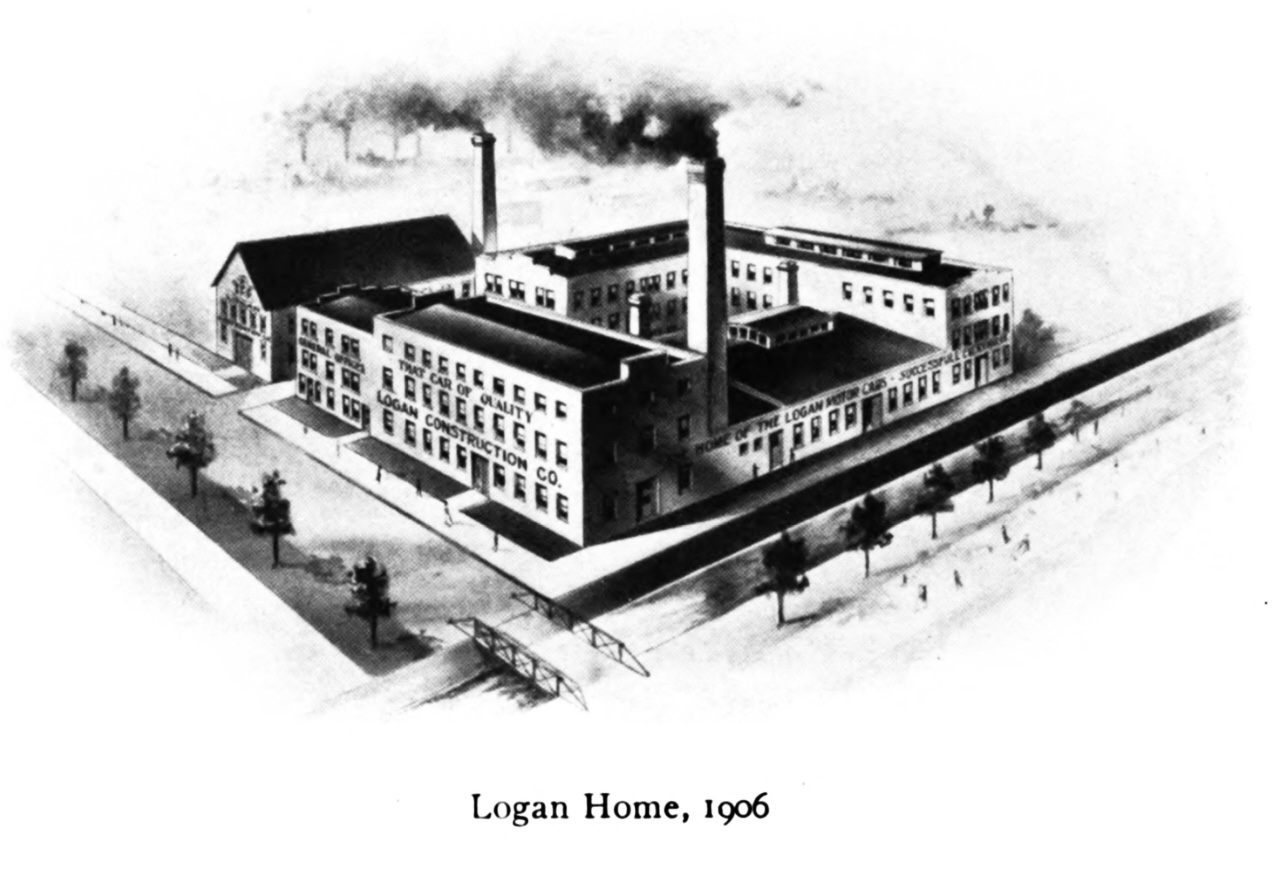
Automobile factory Logan (1906).

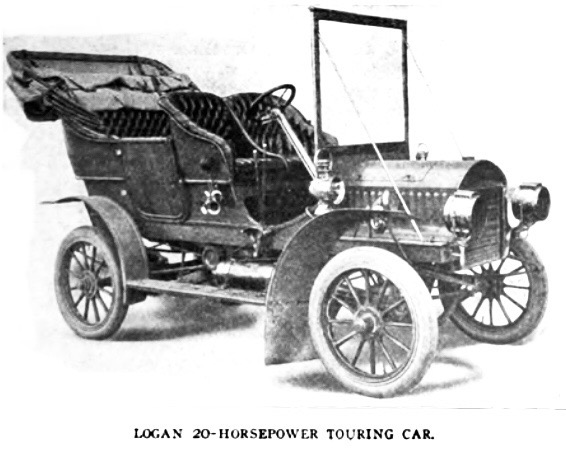
Logan Model D (1905).

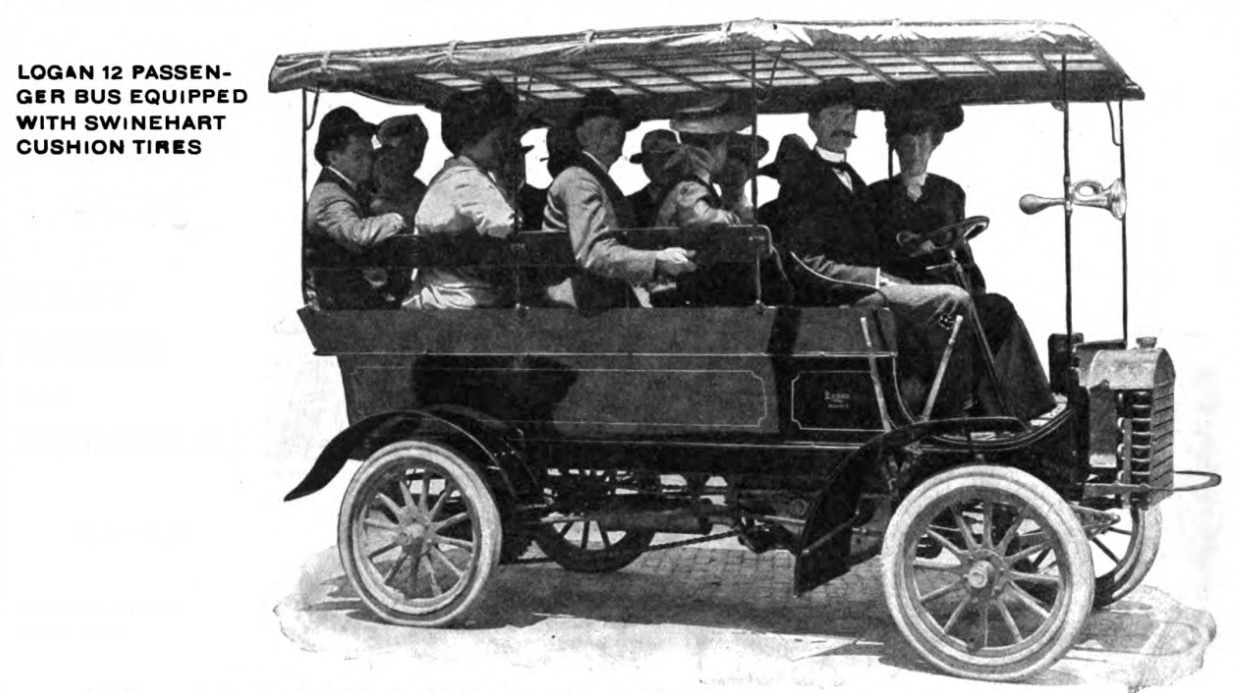
Logan 12 Passenger (1905)

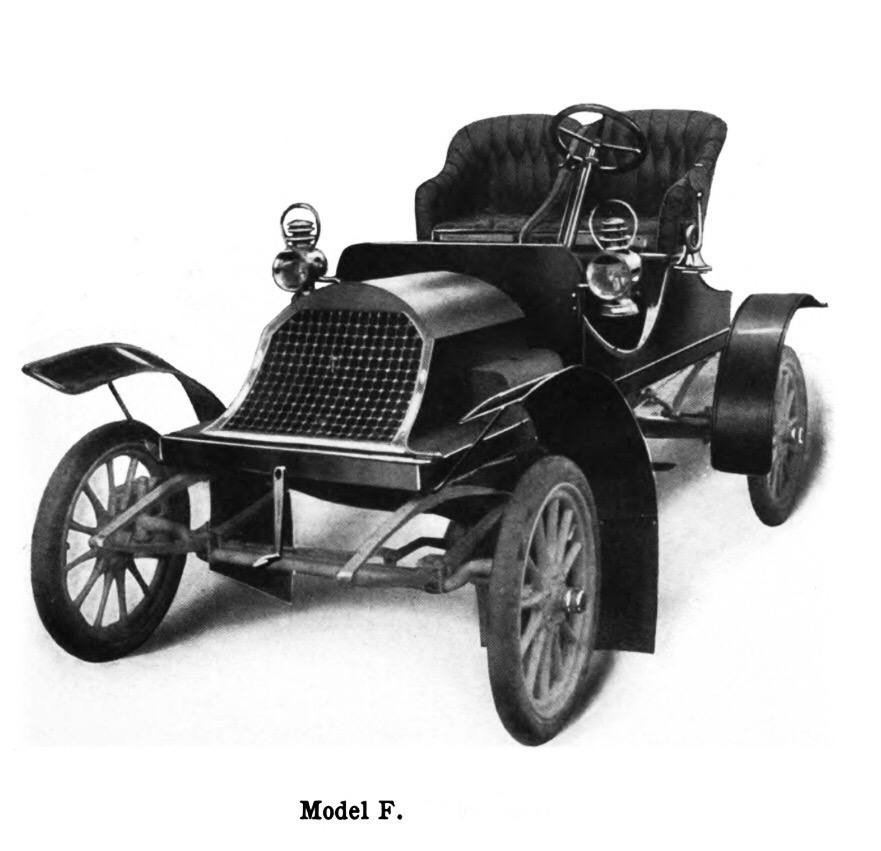
Logan Model F (1906).

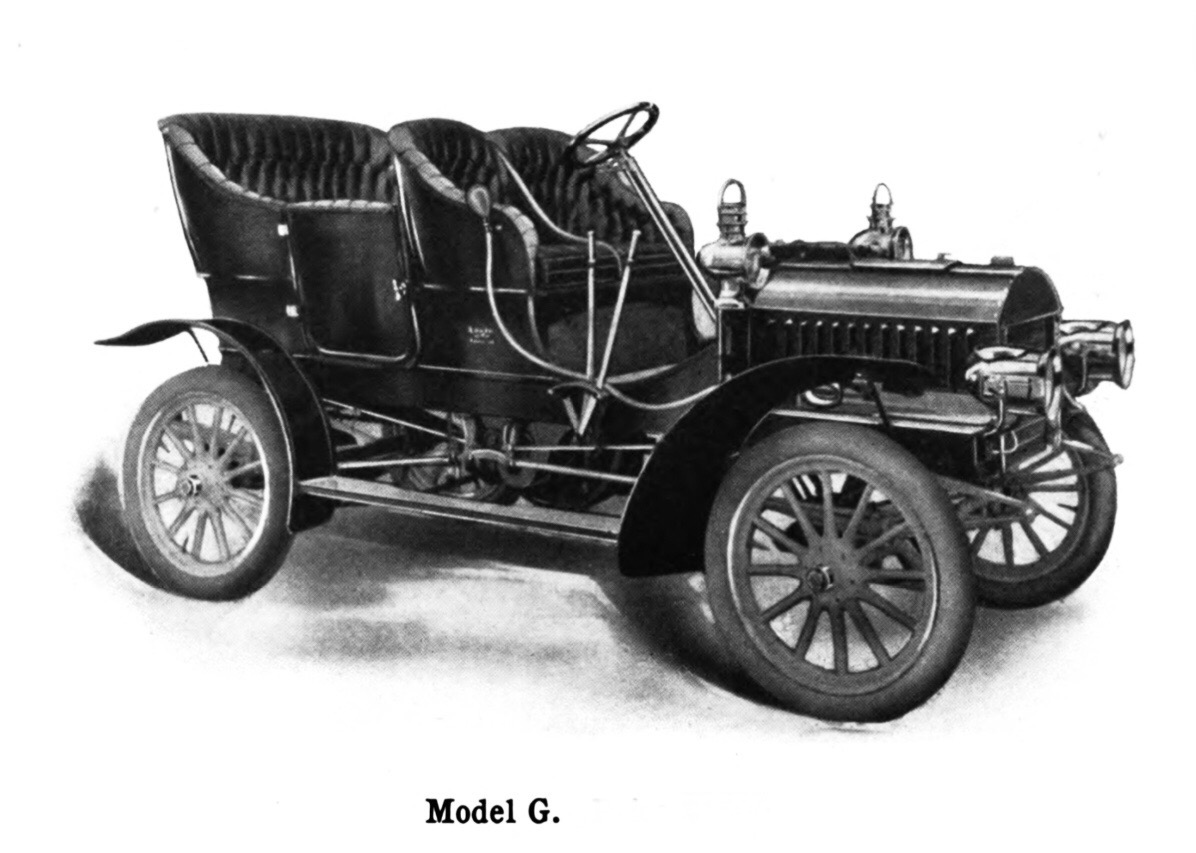
Logan Model G (1906)

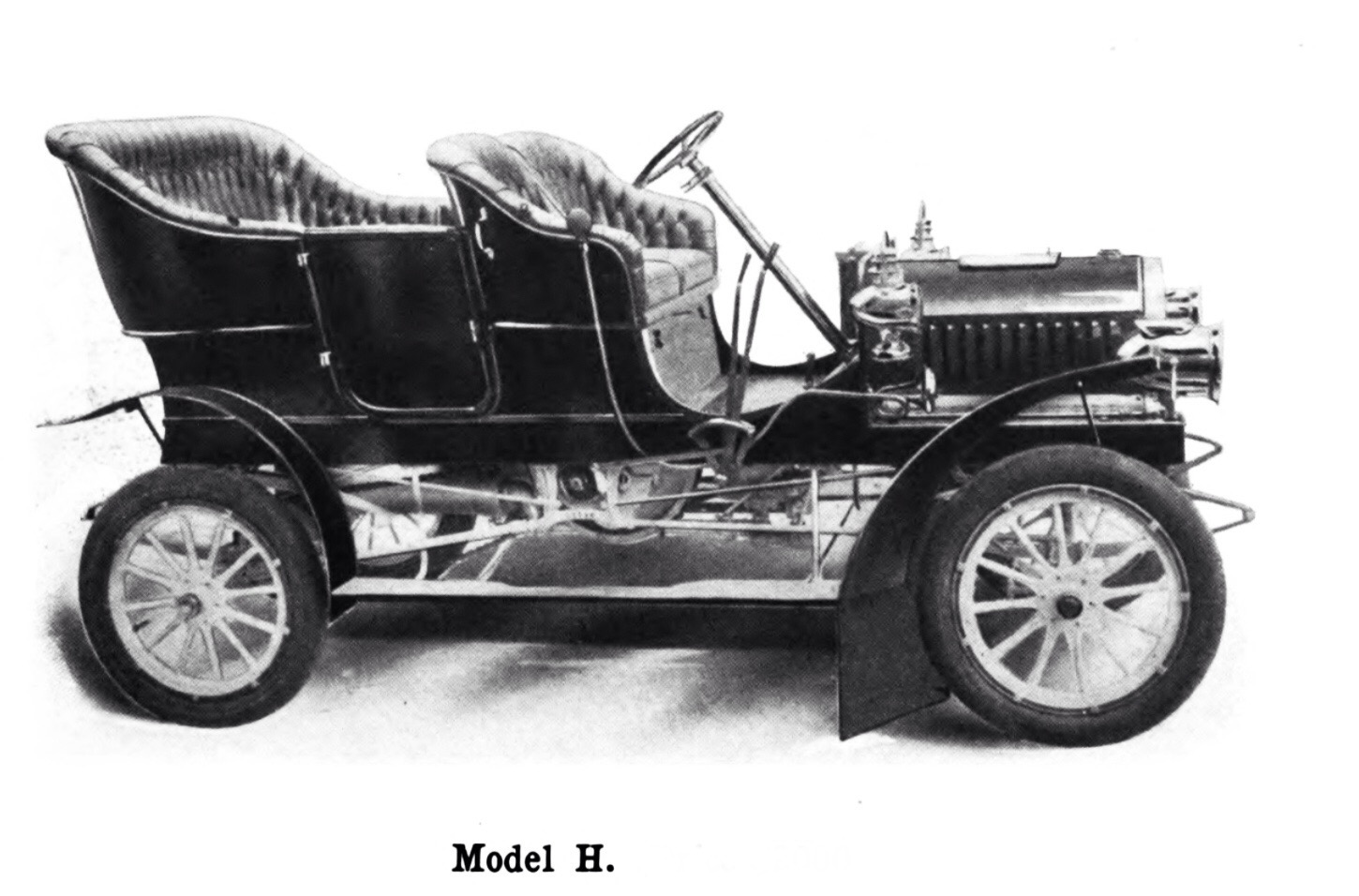
Logan Model H (1906).

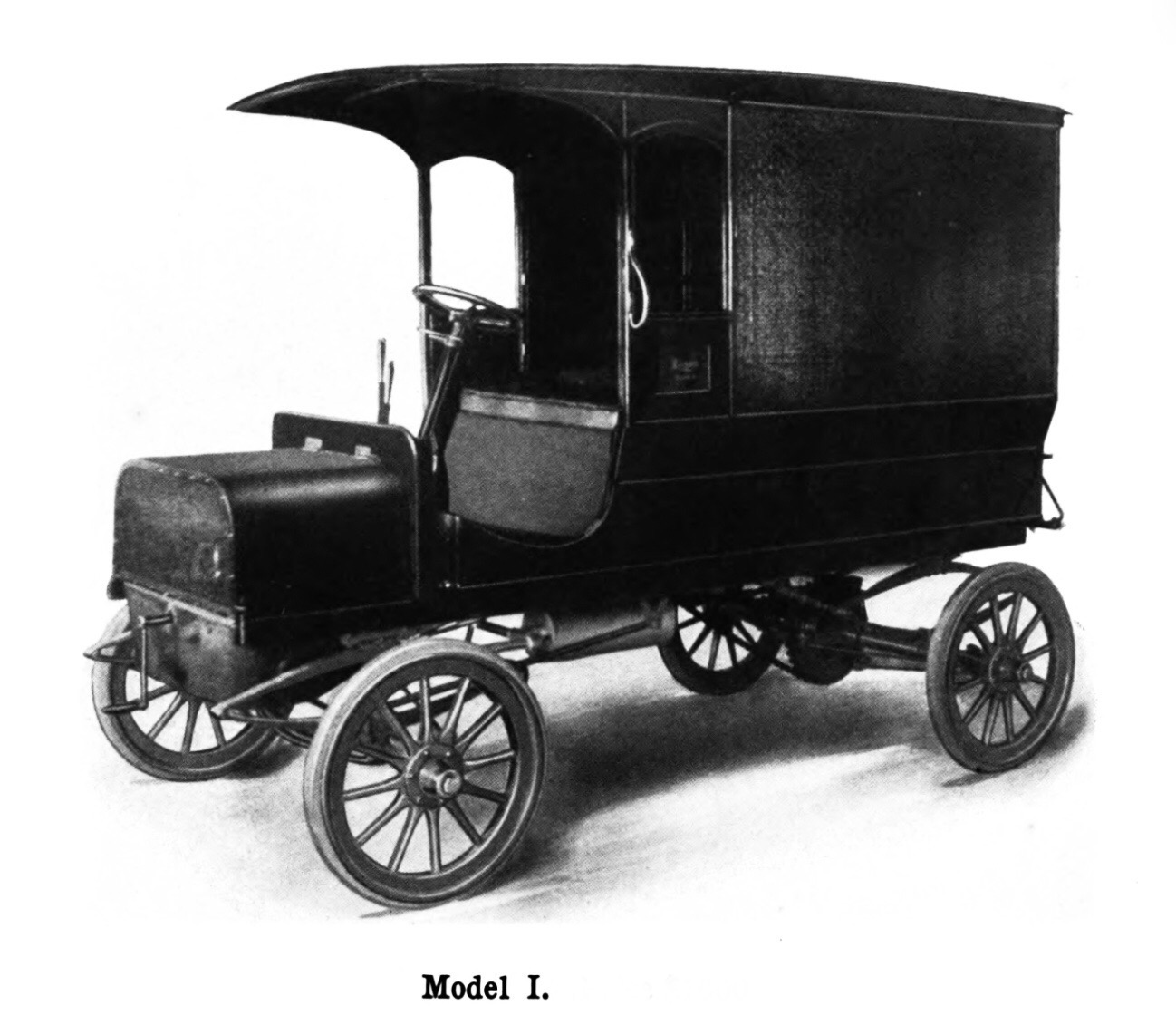
Logan Model I (1906).

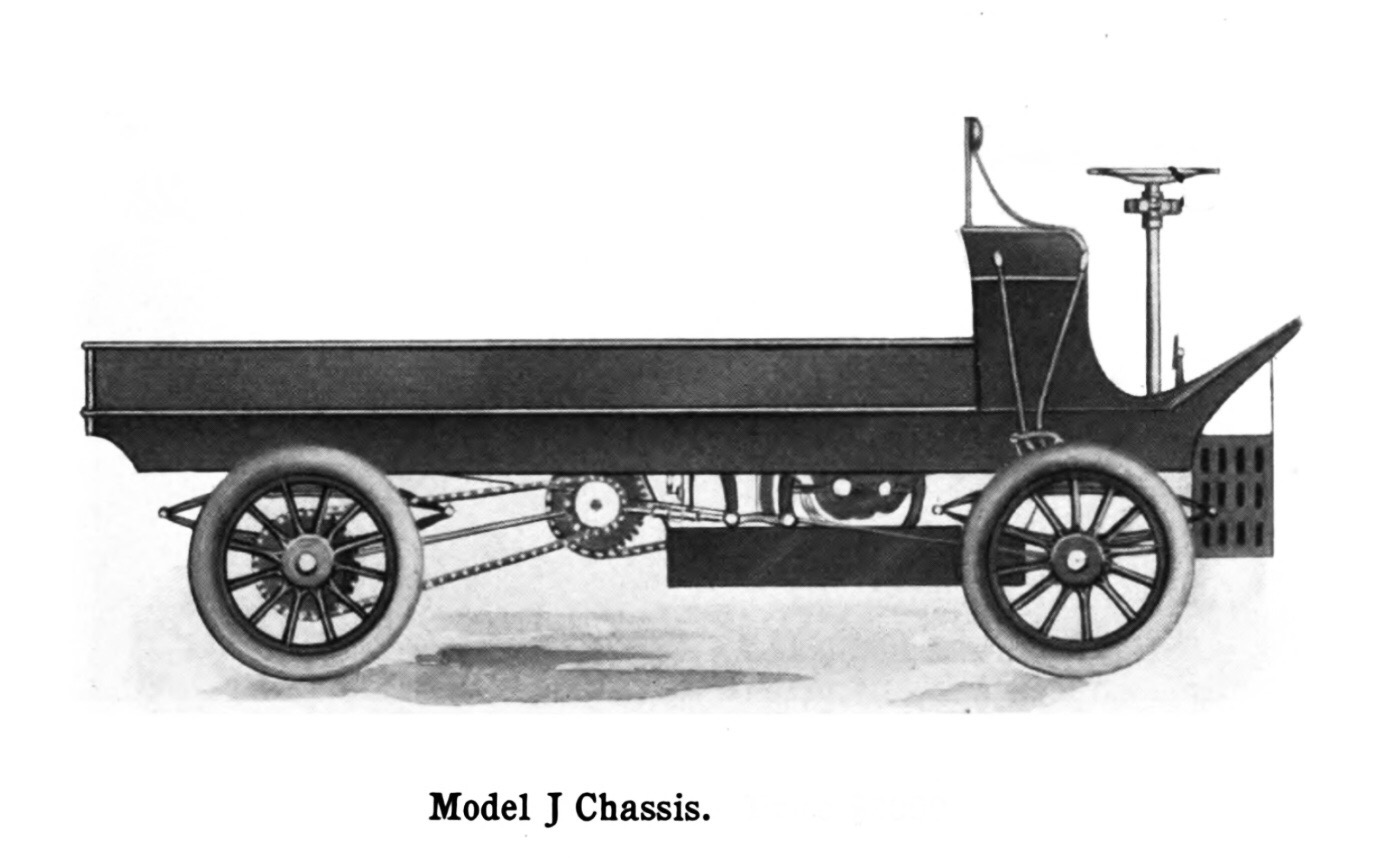
Logan Model J (1906).

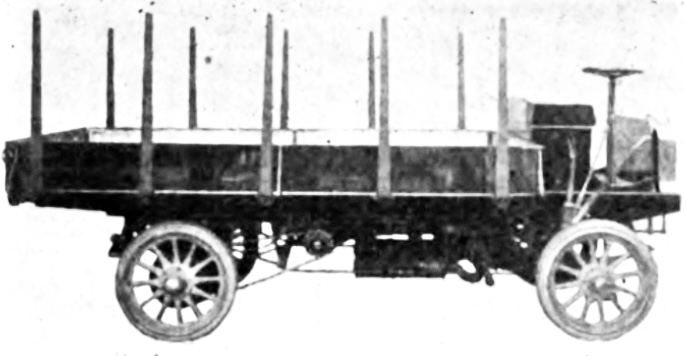
Logan Model M (1907).

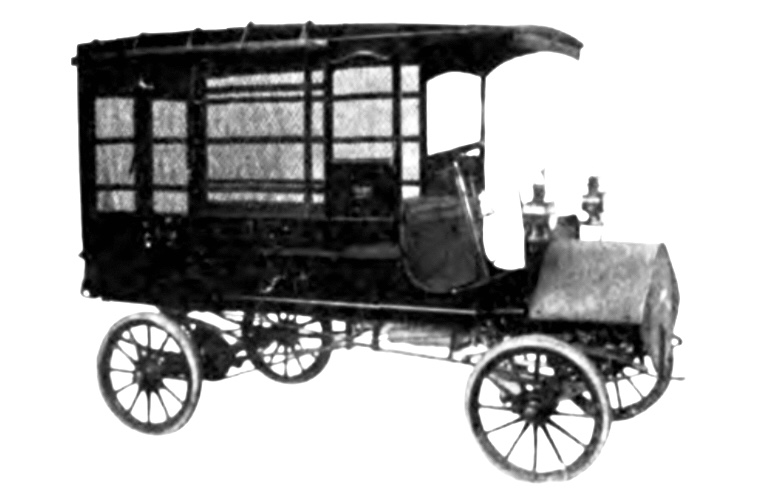
Logan Model N (1907).

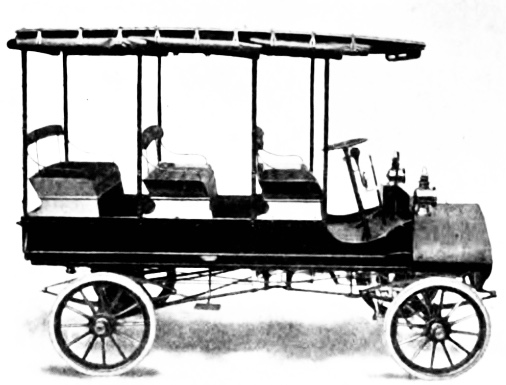
Logan Model N six passengers (1907).

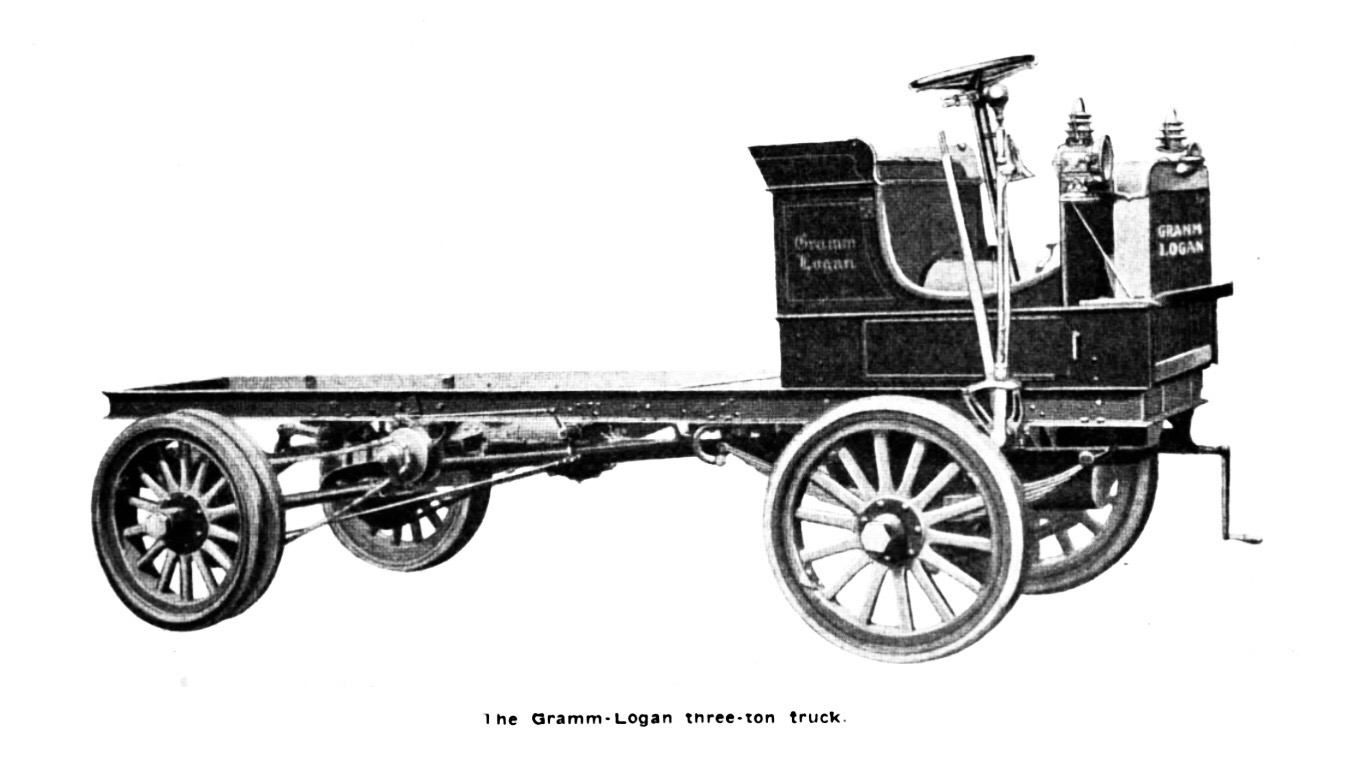
Logan Model M 3t (1908)

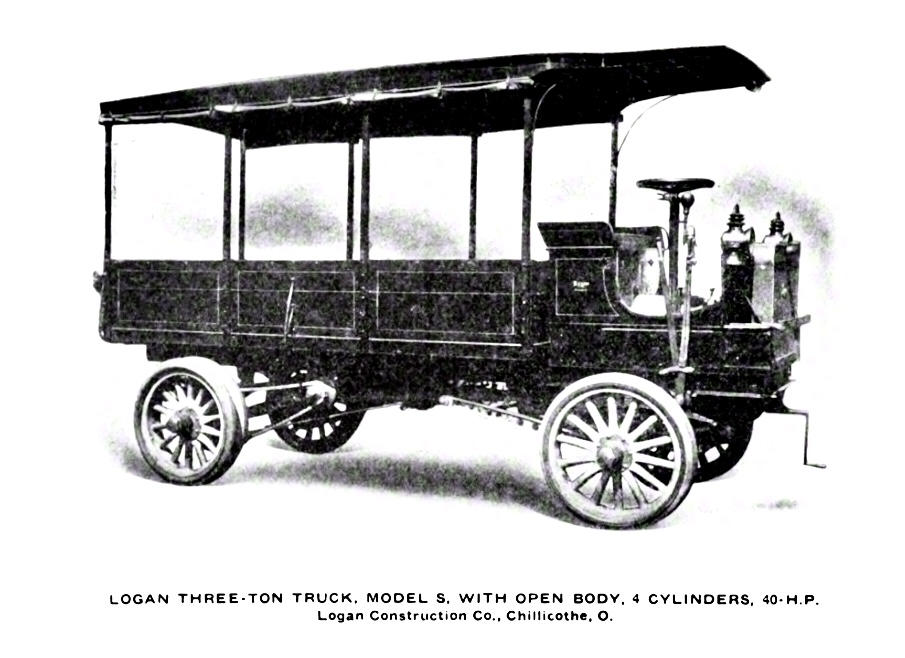
Logan Model S (1907)

The Logan Construction Company was founded in 1903 in Chillicothe, Ohio. They were manufacturers of the Logan automobile until 1908.

== History ==
Benjamin A. Gramm was the designer of the Buckeye and Gramm automobiles before entering production with the Logan in 1904. As early as 1900, first experiments around vehicle construction were carried out in a shed measuring 16 m x 30 m. From these simple starting conditions, a modern factory with 61,300 square feet of usable space developed. Benjamin A. Gramm founded the Motor Storage & Repair Company in Chillicothe, Ohio, in 1902. The production of automobiles in 1902 began with a single steam car model. The vehicle was sold under the name of the founder as Gramm. The retail price was between 750 and 900 US dollars, depending on the equipment. Logan's were 2-cylinder air-cooled and water-cooled touring cars before standardizing with a 4-cylinder air-cooled car in 1906. In 1906, the variety of models increased sharply. Logan's entry-level model was the Model F. The two-seater had an air-cooled two-cylinder engine with 10 hp. The displacement was 1726 cc with a bore of 103.19 mm and a stroke of 103.19 mm. The top speed was 48 km/h. The vehicle weight was 408 kg. The wheelbase was 2286 mm. The price was 900 US dollars. The Model G was a vehicle for four people. The water-cooled two-cylinder engine produced 20 hp. The displacement was 3057 cc with a bore of 120.65 mm and a stroke of 127 mm. The top speed was 48 km/h. The vehicle weight was 751 kg. The wheelbase was 2286 mm. The retail price was 1500 dollars. The top model was the H. The five-seater car had a water-cooled 5097cc twin-cylinder engine with a bore of 139.7mm with a stroke of 152.4mm. The engine output was 30 hp. The top speed was 56 km/h. The vehicle weighed 975 kg. The wheelbase was 2540 mm. The retail price was 2000 dollars. The Model I was a light delivery van with a payload of 680 kg. The engine was an air-cooled two-cylinder engine with 1726 cc. The engine known from the Model G also produced 10 hp here. The top speed was 24 km/h. The vehicle weight was 522 kg. The wheelbase was 2184 mm. The price was 1000 US dollars. The Model J was a Heavy Truck with a payload of 2000 kg. The engine was a water-cooled two-cylinder engine with 5097 cc. The engine known from the Model H also produced 30 hp. The top speed was 16 km/h. The vehicle weight was 1134 kg. The wheelbase was 2540 mm. The price was 2000 US dollars. The Model M was a heavy truck with a payload of 2270 kg, which could be used as a bus with a body kit. The engine was a water-cooled two-cylinder with a displacement of 5097 cc. The engine known from the Model H produced 30 hp. The weight of the vehicle was 1405 kg. The wheelbase was 2743 mm. The price was 2500 US dollars. The Model N was a light commercial vehicle with a payload of 590 kg. The vehicle was available with 5 different bodies up to the six-seater bus. The engine was an air-cooled two-cylinder with a displacement of 1726 cm^{3}. The engine known from the Model G produced 10 hp. The top speed was 24 km/h. The vehicle weighed 630 kg. The wheelbase was 2184 mm. The price was 1000 US dollars.

In 1907 a runabout model called the Blue Streak semi-racer was introduced with a 24-hp engine. This sold for $1,750, (equivalent to $60,469 in 2025). A truck producer along with automobiles, a new company was formed to concentrate on truck manufacturing in 1908. Gramm trucks built up to 1940.

== Overview of production figures ==
| Year | Production | Model | Engine displacement | HP |
|---|---|---|---|---|
| 1901 | | Carry-All | | 7 |
| 1902 | | Gramm Steam Car | | |
| 1903 | | Buckeye Surrey | | 12 |
| 1904 | | Logan | | 10 |
| 1905 | | Logan Model D | 2904 cc | 20 |
| 1906 | | Logan Model F | 1726 cc | 10 |
| | | Logan Model G | 3057 cc | 20 |
| | | Logan Model H | 5097 cc | 30 |
| | | Logan Model I | 1726 cc | 10 |
| | | Logan Model J | 5097 cc | 30 |
| 1907 | | Logan Model M | 5097 cc | 30 |
| | | Logan Model N | 1726 cc | 10 |
| | | Logan Model O | 3295 cc | 20/24 |
| | >12 | Logan Model R | cc | 20 |
| | | Logan Model S | cc | 40 |
| | | Logan Model T | cc | 20 |
| | | Logan Model 14 | 5097 cc | 30 |
| | | Logan Model 12 | 5097 cc | 30 |
| | | Logan Model 18 | 5097 cc | 30 |
| 1908 | | Logan Model O | 3295 cc | 20/24 |
| Sum | | | | |

== Advertisements ==
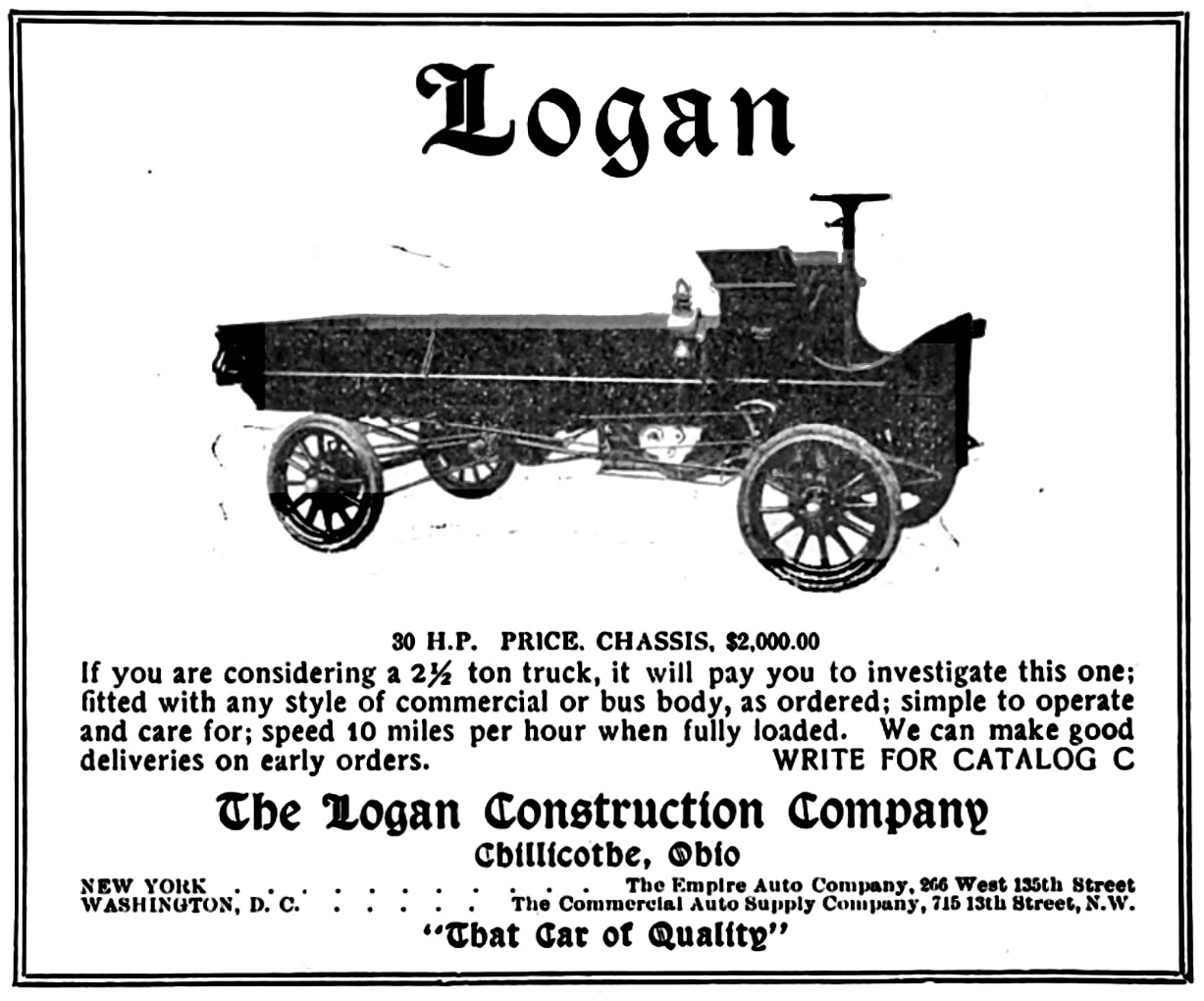
Advertisement Logan Model J (1906).

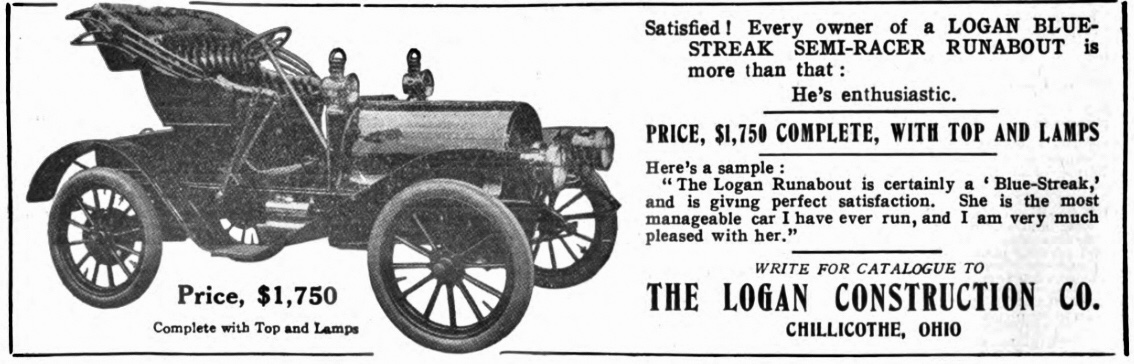
Logan advertisement Semi Racer (1908)

In 1907 Benjamin Gramm sued Premier Motor Manufacturing Company for infringement on the Logan slogan of "That Car of Quality". He was awarded priority of claim.

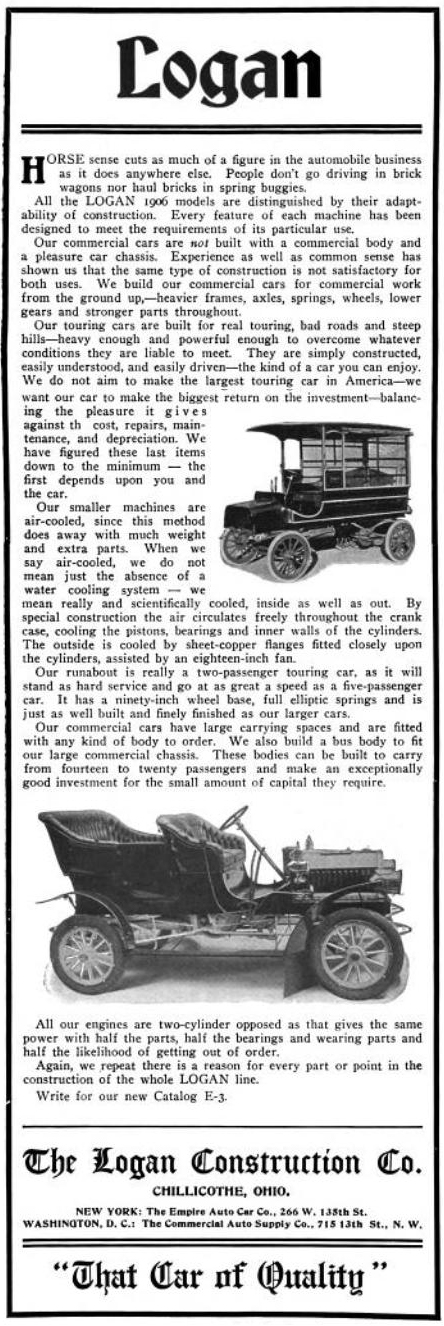
The Logan Construction Company of Chillicothe, Ohio - 1906
