= Mark Vancuren =

American politician (born 1964)

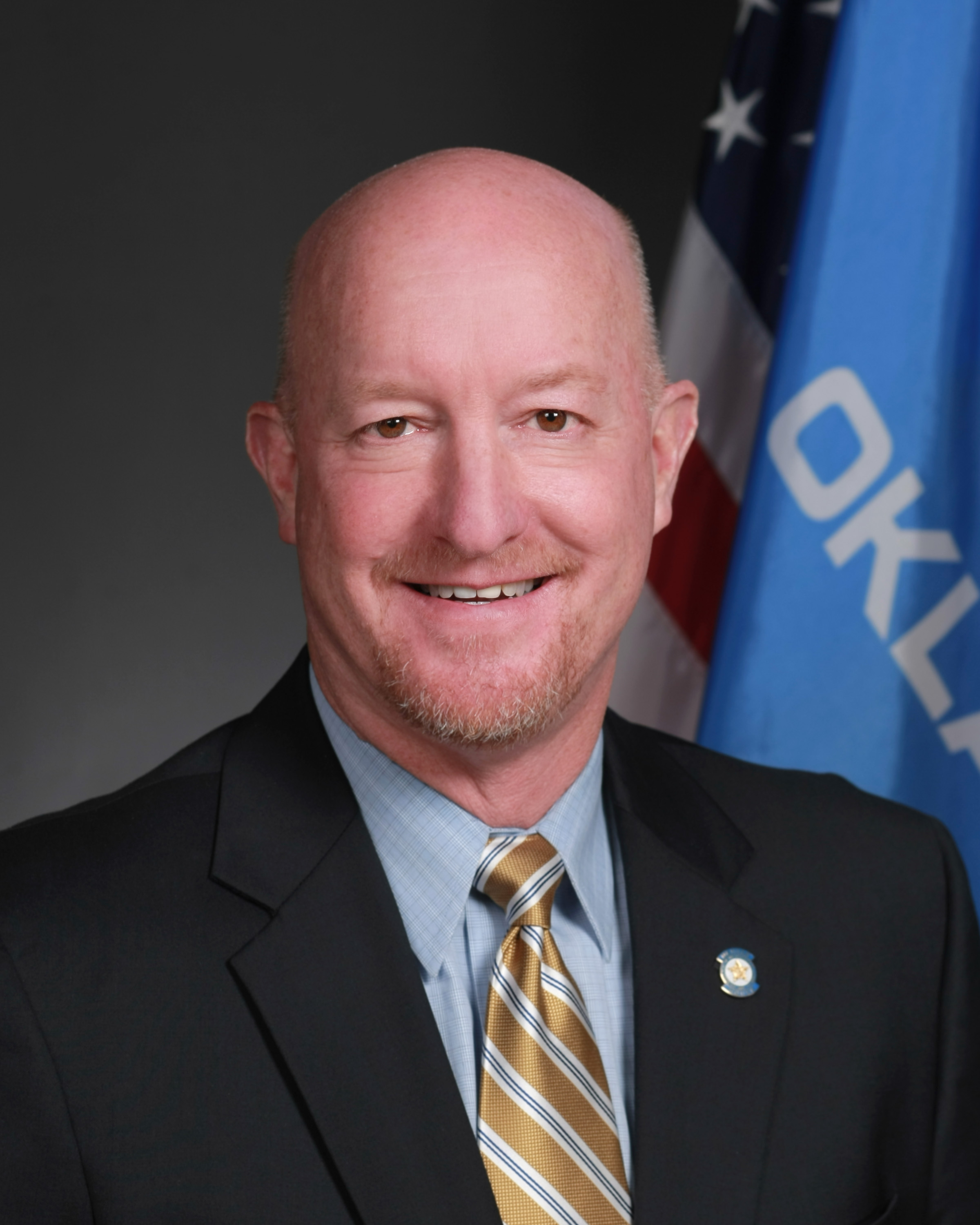

Deputy Tulsa County Commissioner
- Incumbent
- Assumed office January 1, 2025
- Appointed by: Lonnie Sims
- Preceded by: Jim Rea

Member of the Oklahoma House of Representatives from the 74th district
- In office November 15, 2018 – January 1, 2025
- Preceded by: Dale Derby
- Succeeded by: Kevin Wayne Norwood

Personal details
- Born: March 13, 1964 (age 62)
- Citizenship: American; Cherokee Nation
- Party: Republican

Mark Vancuren (born March 13, 1964) is an American politician who served in the Oklahoma House of Representatives representing the 74th district from 2018 to 2025. He currently serves as the Tulsa County deputy county commissioner for the 2nd district.

== Biography ==
Mark Vancuren is a citizen of the Cherokee Nation. He was a biology teacher and basketball, baseball, golf, and track coach at Owasso High School and participated in the 2018 Oklahoma teachers' strike.

== Oklahoma House of Representatives ==
Vancuren was elected to the 74th district of the Oklahoma House of Representatives in 2018. In 2024, he voted in favor of a bill that would require adults to show and ID before accessing porn sites. In December 2024 Vancuren announced he would resign from the legislature to serve as Lonnie Sims' deputy county commissioner. He assumed his new office on January 1, 2025. His wife, Sheila Vancuren, was the first candidate to announce for the special election to succeed him.
