= Jason Lowe (politician) =

American politician

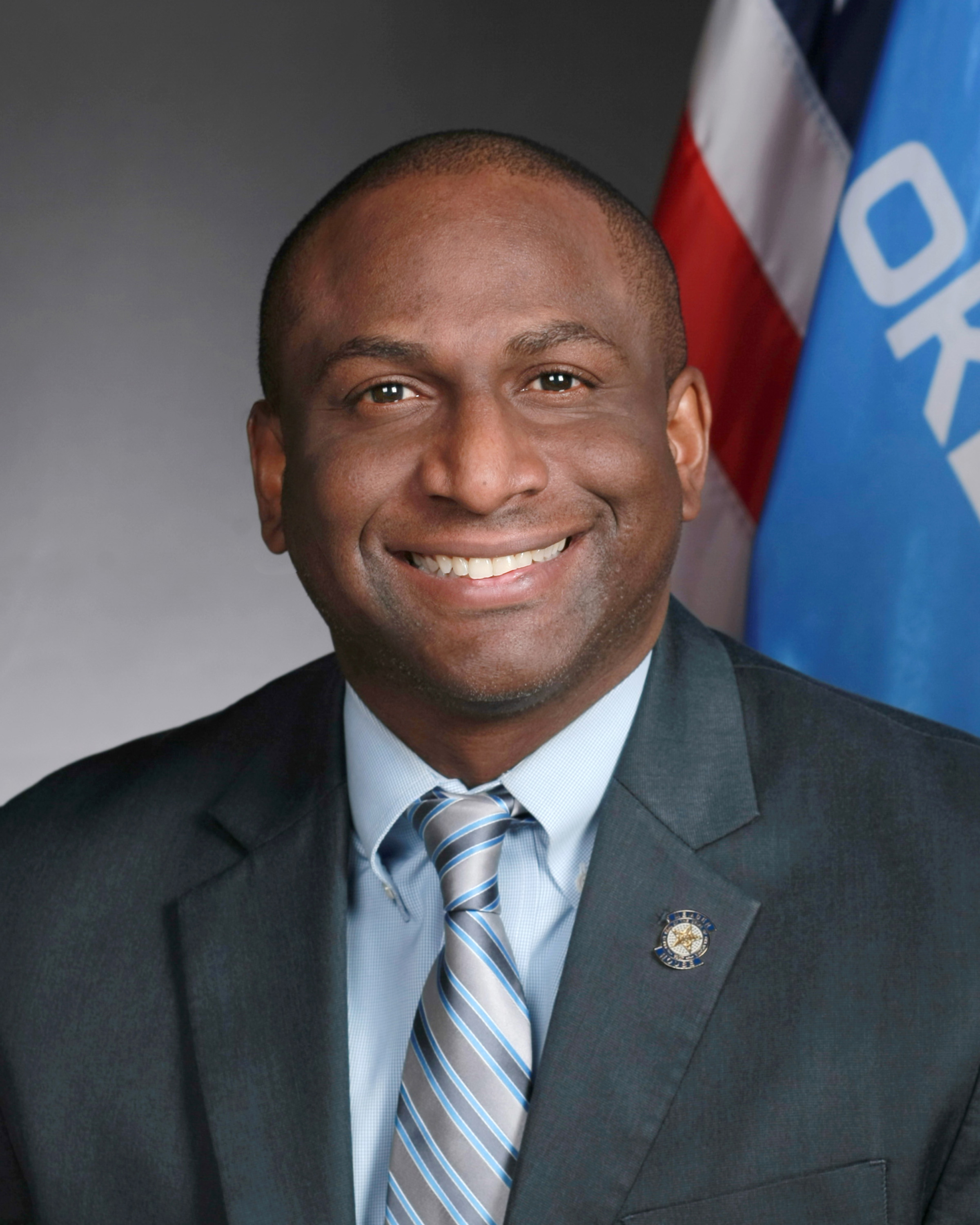

Oklahoma County Commissioner for District 1
- Incumbent
- Assumed office April 21, 2025
- Preceded by: Carrie Blumert

Minority Caucus Secretary of the Oklahoma House of Representatives
- In office January 2019 – January 2023
- Succeeded by: John Waldron

Member of the Oklahoma House of Representatives from the 97th district
- In office November 17, 2016 – April 7, 2025
- Preceded by: Mike Shelton
- Succeeded by: Aletia Timmons

Personal details
- Born: February 20, 1974 (age 52)
- Party: Democratic

Jason Lowe (born February 20, 1974) is an American politician who served in the Oklahoma House of Representatives, representing the 97th district from 2016 to 2025. He has served as the Oklahoma County commissioner for District 1 since April 21, 2025.

== Early life and career ==
Lowe founded a criminal defense law firm in 2009.

== Oklahoma House of Representatives (2016-2025) ==
In 2016, Lowe ran for the 97th district of the Oklahoma House of Representatives and advanced to a runoff election alongside Chris Harrison from a four candidate primary field. Lowe served in the 56th Oklahoma Legislature, 57th Oklahoma Legislature, 58th Oklahoma Legislature, and 59th Oklahoma Legislature.

In 2021, Representative Lowe wrote a letter to the 86th United States Attorney General Merrick Garland requesting the United States Justice Department intercede in the operations of the Oklahoma County Detention Center.

== Oklahoma County commissioner ==
Lowe filed to run for a special election to fill an open seat on the Oklahoma County Board of Commissioners in December 2024. Incumbent commissioner Carrie Blumert resigned to work in the private sector, triggering a special election. In the February Democratic primary he faced Midwest City councilor Sara Bana and former state legislator Anastasia Pittman. He won the Democratic primary and advanced to an April general election against independent Jed Green. He defeated Green with over 85% of the vote.
