= Aletia Timmons =

American politician and judge

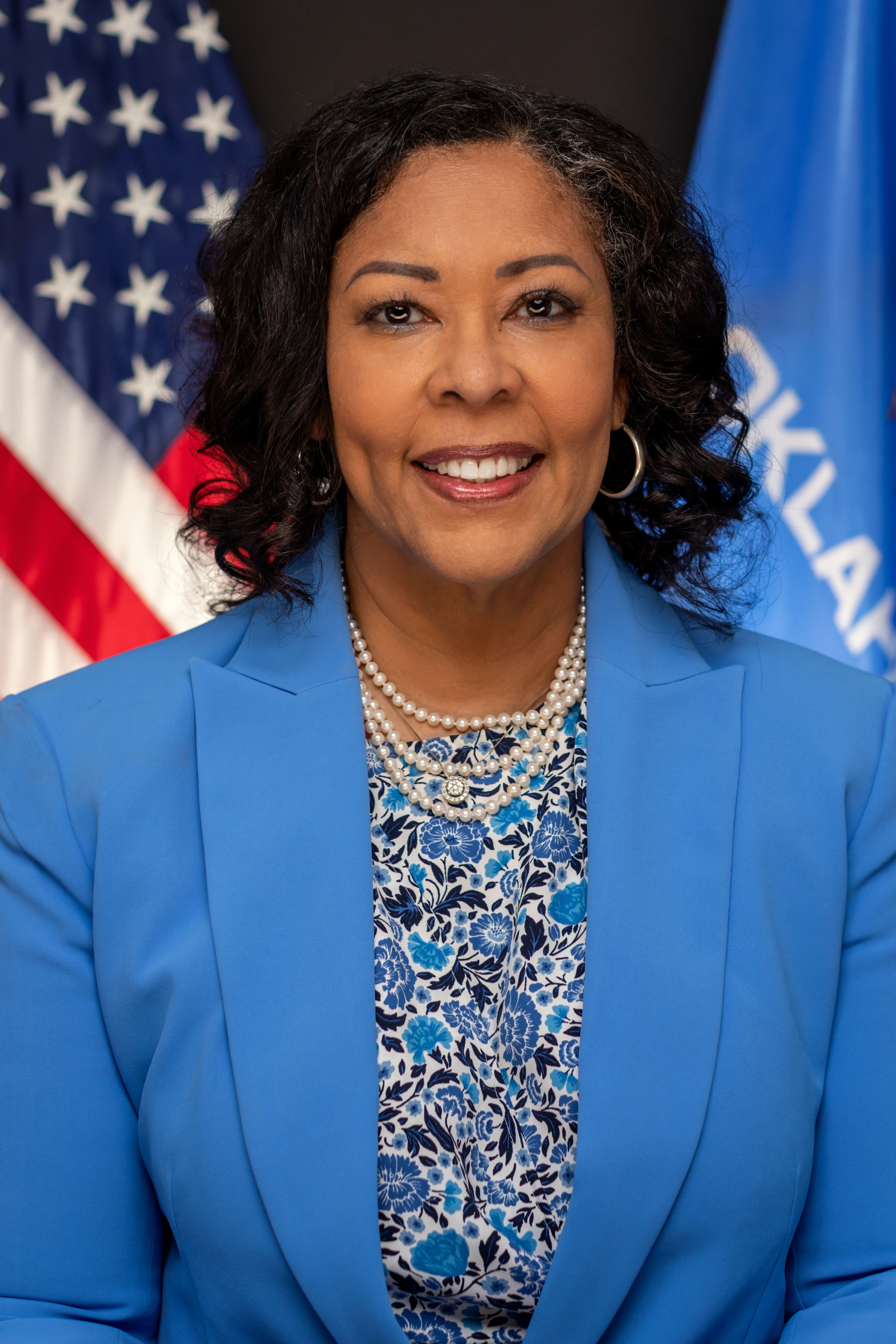
- Official portrait, 2025

Member of the Oklahoma House of Representatives from the 97th district
- Incumbent
- Assumed office June 18, 2025
- Preceded by: Jason Lowe

District Judge for Oklahoma County
- In office 2014 – March 3, 2025
- Preceded by: Kenneth C. Watson
- Succeeded by: Lydia Green

Personal details
- Party: Democratic Party
- Education: Oklahoma State University; University of Oklahoma School of Law

Aletia Haynes Timmons is an American politician and judge who has served as the member for the 97th district of the Oklahoma House of Representatives since 2025. She previously served as the district judge for Oklahoma County from 2014 to 2025.

== Early life, education, and career ==
Aletia Timmons graduated from John Marshall High School in Oklahoma City before attending Oklahoma State University and earning a Juris Doctor from the University of Oklahoma School of Law. After law school, she worked as an attorney for General Motors and the Oklahoma County district attorney's office. In 2003, she founded Timmons and Associates, an Oklahoma City law firm, and she ran the firm until she was elected as a district judge in 2014.

== Oklahoma County District Judge ==
In 2014, Timmons was elected Oklahoma County District Judge after defeating Joel Porter in the general election. She represented Judicial District 7, Office 1 and succeeded Kenneth C. Watson. She was reelected without opposition in 2018. In 2020, she was called as a witness by the defense in the removal trial of Oklahoma County District Judge Kendra Coleman and testified to "hostile" atmosphere among judges in the county. In 2021, she approved the Oklahoma State Department of Education takeover of Western Heights Public Schools.

In 2022 she was reelected without opposition. She retired from the bench on March 3, 2025, to run for the Oklahoma House of Representatives and she was succeeded in office by Lydia Green.

== Oklahoma House of Representatives ==
In 2025, Timmons ran to succeed Jason Lowe in representing the 97th district of the Oklahoma House of Representatives. The only other candidate to file was fellow Democrat JeKia Harrison and Timmons campaigned with endorsements from Lowe and Senator Nikki Nice. She won the June general election. She was sworn in on June 18.
