= Loganville =

Loganville is the name of several places in the United States of America:

- Loganville, California
- Loganville, Georgia
- Loganville, Pennsylvania
- Loganville, Wisconsin

== See also ==
- Logansville, Ohio
