= Logan Peak =

Mountain in Cache County, Utah, United States

- Location within Utah

Highest point
- Elevation: 9,714 ft (2,961 m) NAVD 88
- Prominence: 2,995 ft (913 m)
- Coordinates: 41°42′49″N 111°43′04″W

Geography
- Location: Cache County, Utah, U.S.
- Parent range: Bear River Mountains
- Topo map: USGS Logan Peak

Climbing
- Easiest route: Hiking trail or rugged jeep trail

Logan Peak, commonly referred to as Mount Logan, is a peak in the Bear River Mountains, a branch of the Wasatch Range in Cache County, Utah, United States.

== Description ==
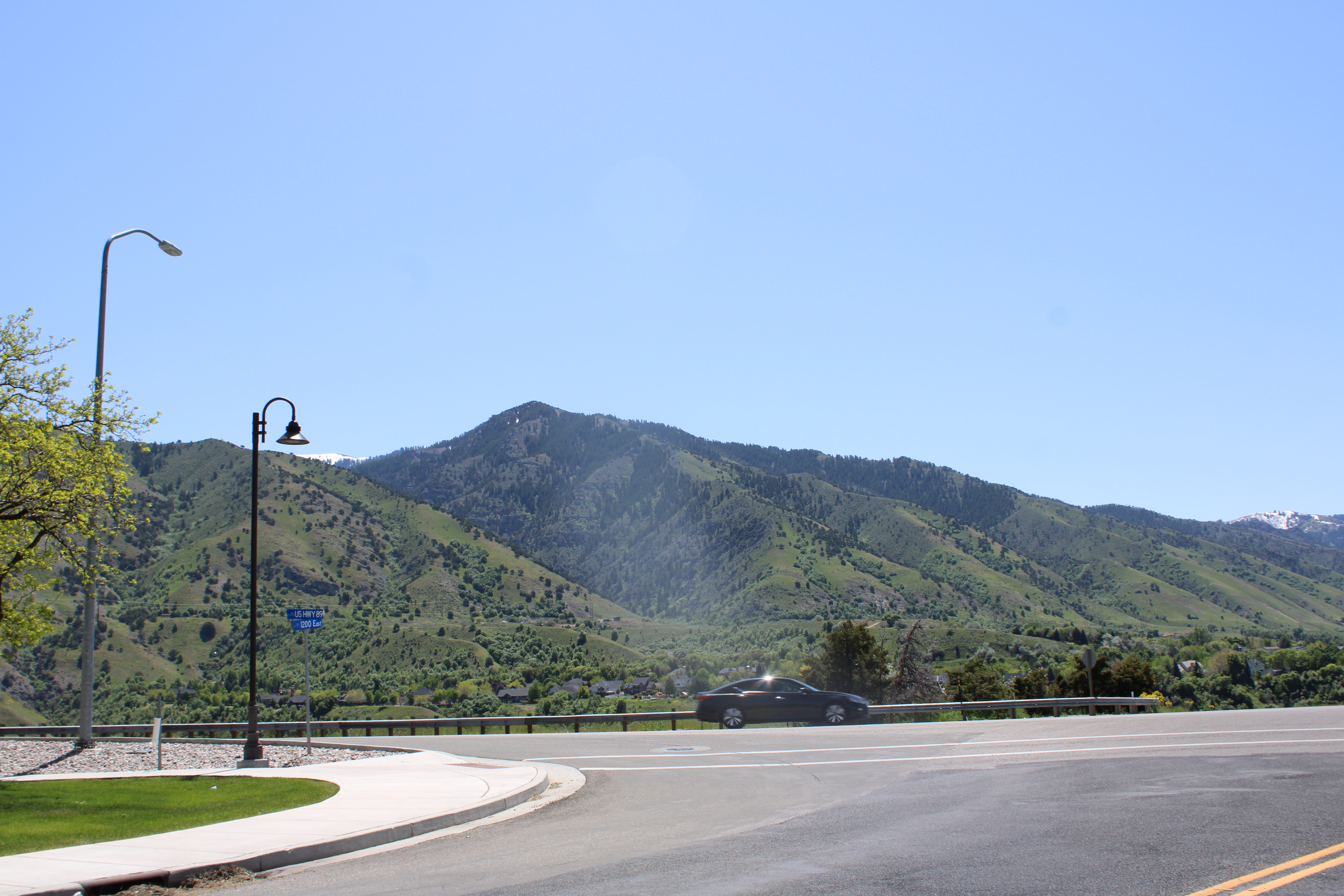
Southeast across US 89 at Logan Peak, May 2024.

Located 6 miles (9.7 km) east-southeast of Logan, Utah in the Uinta-Wasatch-Cache National Forest, it is the second highest peak overlooking Cache Valley after Mt. Naomi. Logan Peak rises to an elevation of 9,714 feet (2,961 m) NAVD88. It is served by hiking trails and a narrow, unpaved access road suitable only for offroad vehicles. It is the only mountain in the Bear River Range with a road to the summit. The peak houses a weather station and a telecommunications tower. Logan Peak is a popular destination for hikers and mountain bikers during the warmer months and advanced cross-country skiers in winter. During the winter, a circular hollow on the east side of the peak, known locally as Crystal Valley, is popular with snowmobilers.

== Climate ==
Climate data for Logan Peak 41.7101 N, 111.7197 W, Elevation: 9,285 ft (2,830 m) (1991–2020 normals)
| Month | Jan | Feb | Mar | Apr | May | Jun | Jul | Aug | Sep | Oct | Nov | Dec | Year |
|---|---|---|---|---|---|---|---|---|---|---|---|---|---|
| Mean daily maximum °F (°C) | 27.3 (−2.6) | 28.4 (−2.0) | 32.8 (0.4) | 39.3 (4.1) | 49.4 (9.7) | 61.4 (16.3) | 72.6 (22.6) | 71.4 (21.9) | 61.1 (16.2) | 46.8 (8.2) | 34.4 (1.3) | 26.9 (−2.8) | 46.0 (7.8) |
| Daily mean °F (°C) | 19.8 (−6.8) | 19.6 (−6.9) | 24.5 (−4.2) | 29.8 (−1.2) | 39.8 (4.3) | 50.6 (10.3) | 60.2 (15.7) | 59.1 (15.1) | 49.7 (9.8) | 37.0 (2.8) | 26.1 (−3.3) | 19.5 (−6.9) | 36.3 (2.4) |
| Mean daily minimum °F (°C) | 12.3 (−10.9) | 10.7 (−11.8) | 16.2 (−8.8) | 20.4 (−6.4) | 30.2 (−1.0) | 39.9 (4.4) | 47.9 (8.8) | 46.9 (8.3) | 38.3 (3.5) | 27.2 (−2.7) | 17.8 (−7.9) | 12.1 (−11.1) | 26.7 (−3.0) |
| Average precipitation inches (mm) | 6.27 (159) | 4.74 (120) | 4.28 (109) | 3.91 (99) | 3.28 (83) | 1.70 (43) | 0.95 (24) | 1.34 (34) | 2.08 (53) | 3.22 (82) | 4.15 (105) | 5.12 (130) | 41.04 (1,041) |
Source: PRISM Climate Group

== See also ==
- List of mountains in Utah
