= Logan Township =

Logan Township may refer to:

== Arkansas ==
- Logan Township, Baxter County, Arkansas, in Baxter County, Arkansas
- Logan Township, Logan County, Arkansas, in Logan County, Arkansas

== Illinois ==
- Logan Township, Peoria County, Illinois

== Indiana ==
- Logan Township, Dearborn County, Indiana
- Logan Township, Fountain County, Indiana
- Logan Township, Pike County, Indiana

== Iowa ==
- Logan Township, Calhoun County, Iowa
- Logan Township, Clay County, Iowa
- Logan Township, Ida County, Iowa
- Logan Township, Lyon County, Iowa
- Logan Township, Marshall County, Iowa
- Logan Township, Sioux County, Iowa
- Logan Township, Winnebago County, Iowa

== Kansas ==
- Logan Township, Allen County, Kansas
- Logan Township, Barton County, Kansas
- Logan Township, Butler County, Kansas
- Logan Township, Decatur County, Kansas
- Logan Township, Dickinson County, Kansas
- Logan Township, Edwards County, Kansas
- Logan Township, Gray County, Kansas
- Logan Township, Lincoln County, Kansas, in Lincoln County, Kansas
- Logan Township, Marion County, Kansas
- Logan Township, Marshall County, Kansas, in Marshall County, Kansas
- Logan Township, Meade County, Kansas, in Meade County, Kansas
- Logan Township, Mitchell County, Kansas, in Mitchell County, Kansas
- Logan Township, Ottawa County, Kansas, in Ottawa County, Kansas
- Logan Township, Pawnee County, Kansas, in Pawnee County, Kansas
- Logan Township, Phillips County, Kansas, in Phillips County, Kansas
- Logan Township, Sheridan County, Kansas
- Logan Township, Sherman County, Kansas
- Logan Township, Smith County, Kansas, in Smith County, Kansas
- Logan Township, Washington County, Kansas, in Washington County, Kansas

== Michigan ==
- Logan Township, Lenawee County, Michigan, now Adrian Charter Township
- Logan Township, Mason County, Michigan
- Logan Township, Ogemaw County, Michigan

== Minnesota ==
- Logan Township, Aitkin County, Minnesota
- Logan Township, Grant County, Minnesota

== Missouri ==
- Logan Township, Reynolds County, Missouri
- Logan Township, Wayne County, Missouri

== Nebraska ==
- Logan Township, Adams County, Nebraska
- Logan Township, Antelope County, Nebraska
- Logan Township, Buffalo County, Nebraska
- Logan Township, Burt County, Nebraska
- Logan Township, Clay County, Nebraska
- Logan Township, Cuming County, Nebraska
- Logan Township, Dixon County, Nebraska
- Logan Township, Dodge County, Nebraska
- Logan Township, Gage County, Nebraska
- Logan Township, Kearney County, Nebraska
- Logan Township, Knox County, Nebraska

== New Jersey ==
- Logan Township, New Jersey

== North Dakota ==
- Logan Township, Burleigh County, North Dakota, in Burleigh County, North Dakota

== Ohio ==
- Logan Township, Auglaize County, Ohio

== Pennsylvania ==
- Logan Township, Blair County, Pennsylvania
- Logan Township, Clinton County, Pennsylvania
- Logan Township, Huntingdon County, Pennsylvania

== South Dakota ==
- Logan Township, Beadle County, South Dakota, in Beadle County, South Dakota
- Logan Township, Clark County, South Dakota, in Clark County, South Dakota
- Logan Township, Hand County, South Dakota, in Hand County, South Dakota
- Logan Township, Jerauld County, South Dakota, in Jerauld County, South Dakota
- Logan Township, Minnehaha County, South Dakota, in Minnehaha County, South Dakota
- Logan Township, Sanborn County, South Dakota, in Sanborn County, South Dakota

== See also ==
- Logan County (disambiguation)
- Logan (disambiguation)
