= Bryan Logan =

American politician

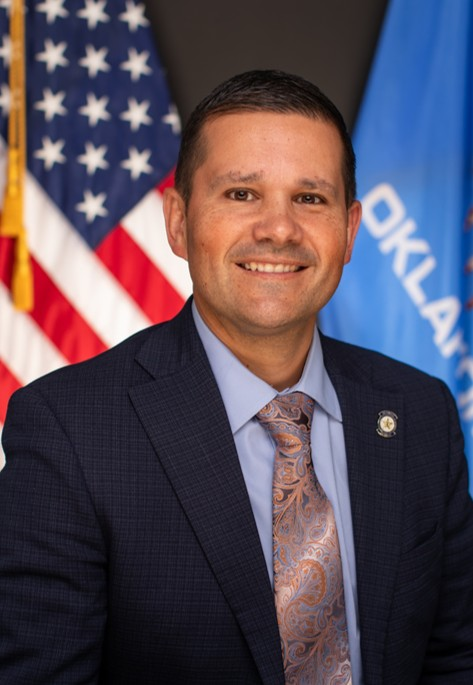

Member of the Oklahoma Senate from the 8th district
- Incumbent
- Assumed office May 21, 2025
- Preceded by: Roger Thompson

Personal details
- Party: Republican

Bryan Logan is an American politician who has represented the 8th district of the Oklahoma Senate since 2025.

== Biography ==
Prior to his election to the Oklahoma Senate, Logan worked as the pastor for Paden Pentecostal Holiness Church. He also ran a small carpentry business and raised cattle.

=== Oklahoma Senate ===
Logan filed to run in a six candidate Republican primary to succeed Senator Roger Thompson. He campaigned in the primary as a "Christian conservative." He advanced to a runoff alongside David Nelson, which he won with 55 percent of the vote. He received 61 percent of the vote in the May general election.
