= Roger Thompson (politician) =

American politician

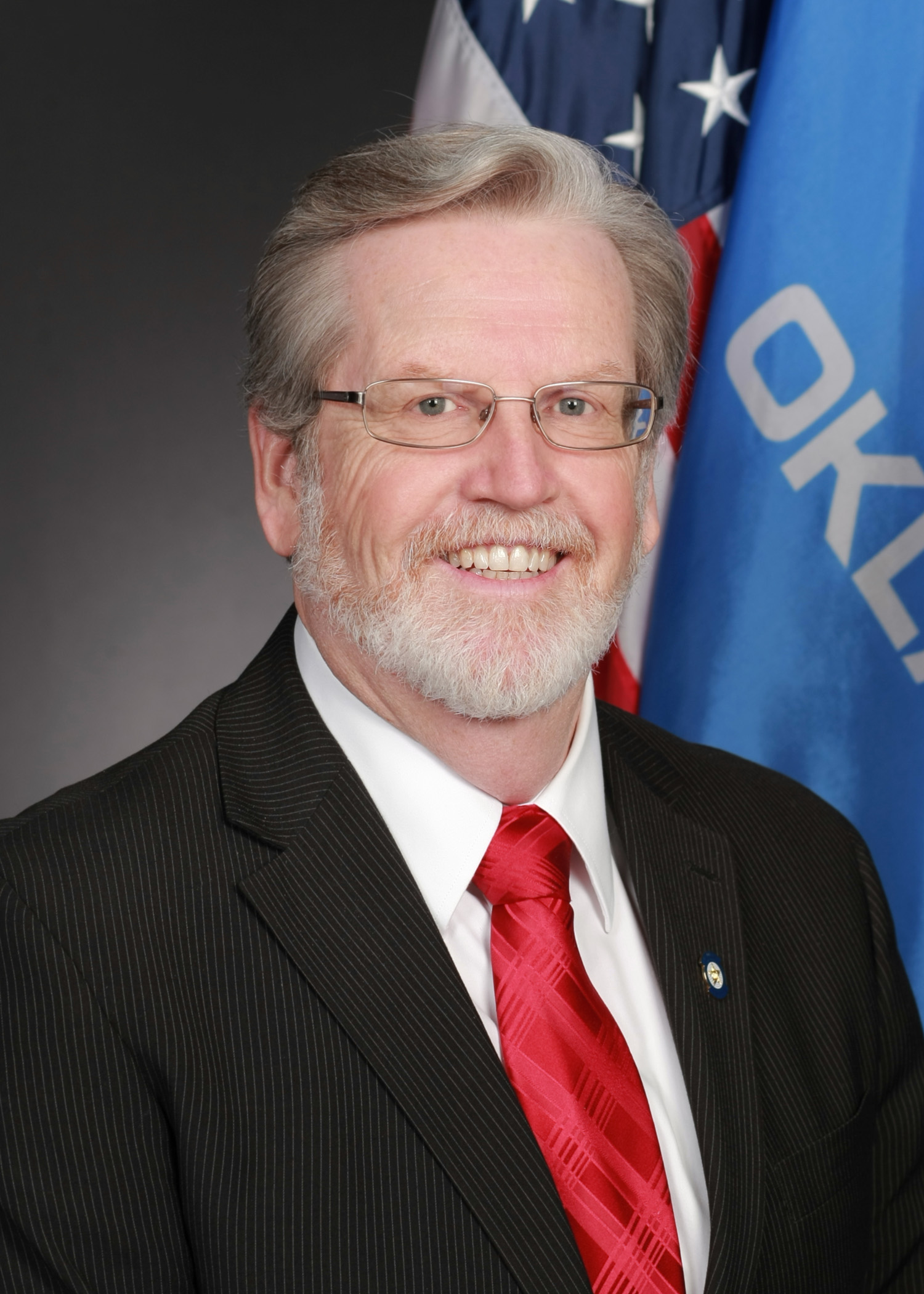

Member of the Oklahoma Senate from the 8th district
- In office November 2014 – November 1, 2024
- Preceded by: Roger Ballenger
- Succeeded by: Bryan Logan

Personal details
- Born: 1956 or 1957 (age 68–69) Oklahoma City
- Party: Republican
- Spouse: Pamela
- Children: 2
- Education: Doctorate of Theology
- Alma mater: Muskogee High School; Preston Road School of Preaching; Southwestern Bible College and Seminary
- Occupation: Newspaper Publisher

Roger Lynn Thompson (born c. 1957) is a former Republican member of the Oklahoma State Senate, representing the 8th district. He was initially elected in November 2014. He is the president of the News Leader Company, Inc., which owns the Okemah News Leader, in Okemah, Oklahoma.

Thompson resigned from the Oklahoma Senate in November 2024.
