= Custer Township, Nebraska =

Custer Township, Nebraska may refer to the following places in Nebraska:

- Custer Township, Antelope County, Nebraska
- Custer Township, Custer County, Nebraska

== See also ==
- East Custer Township, Custer County, Nebraska
- Custer Township (disambiguation)
