= Etha =

Etha may refer to:

- Saint Etha, an alternate name of the 5th-century Cornish Saint Tetha
- Etna, Nebraska, formerly known as "Etha"
- Etha (wasp), a genus of wasps

ETHA may refer to:

- Altenstadt Air Base (ICAO code ETHA)

Etha may refer to: Ethan
