= Douglas Grove =

Douglas Grove may refer to one of the following places in the United States:

- Douglas Grove, West Virginia
- Douglas Grove Township, Custer County, Nebraska
