= Custer Township, Kansas =

Custer Township, Kansas may refer to several places:

- Custer Township, Decatur County, Kansas
- Custer Township, Mitchell County, Kansas, in Mitchell County, Kansas

== See also ==
- List of Kansas townships
- Custer Township (disambiguation)
