= Milburn, Nebraska =

Unincorporated community in Nebraska, U.S.

Coordinates: 41°43′10″N 99°43′52″W

Milburn is an unincorporated community in Custer County, Nebraska, United States.

Milburn is located within the boundaries of the 68813 Zip code, serviced out of Anselmo, Nebraska. It is also located at the northwestern edge of the Milburn Township boundary. It is in Nebraska State Senate district 43.

== History ==
A post office at Milburn was established in 1887 by James Milburn, and named for him.
