= Triumph Township =

Triumph Township may refer to one of the following places in the United States:

- Triumph Township, Custer County, Nebraska
- Triumph Township, Ramsey County, North Dakota
- Triumph Township, Pennsylvania

See also

- Triumph (disambiguation)
