= Finchville =

Finchville may refer to:

- Finchville, Kentucky, an unincorporated community within Shelby County
- Finchville, Nebraska, an unincorporated community in Custer County
- a hamlet in Mount Hope, Orange County, New York
