= Broken Bow, Nebraska =

City in Nebraska

- City
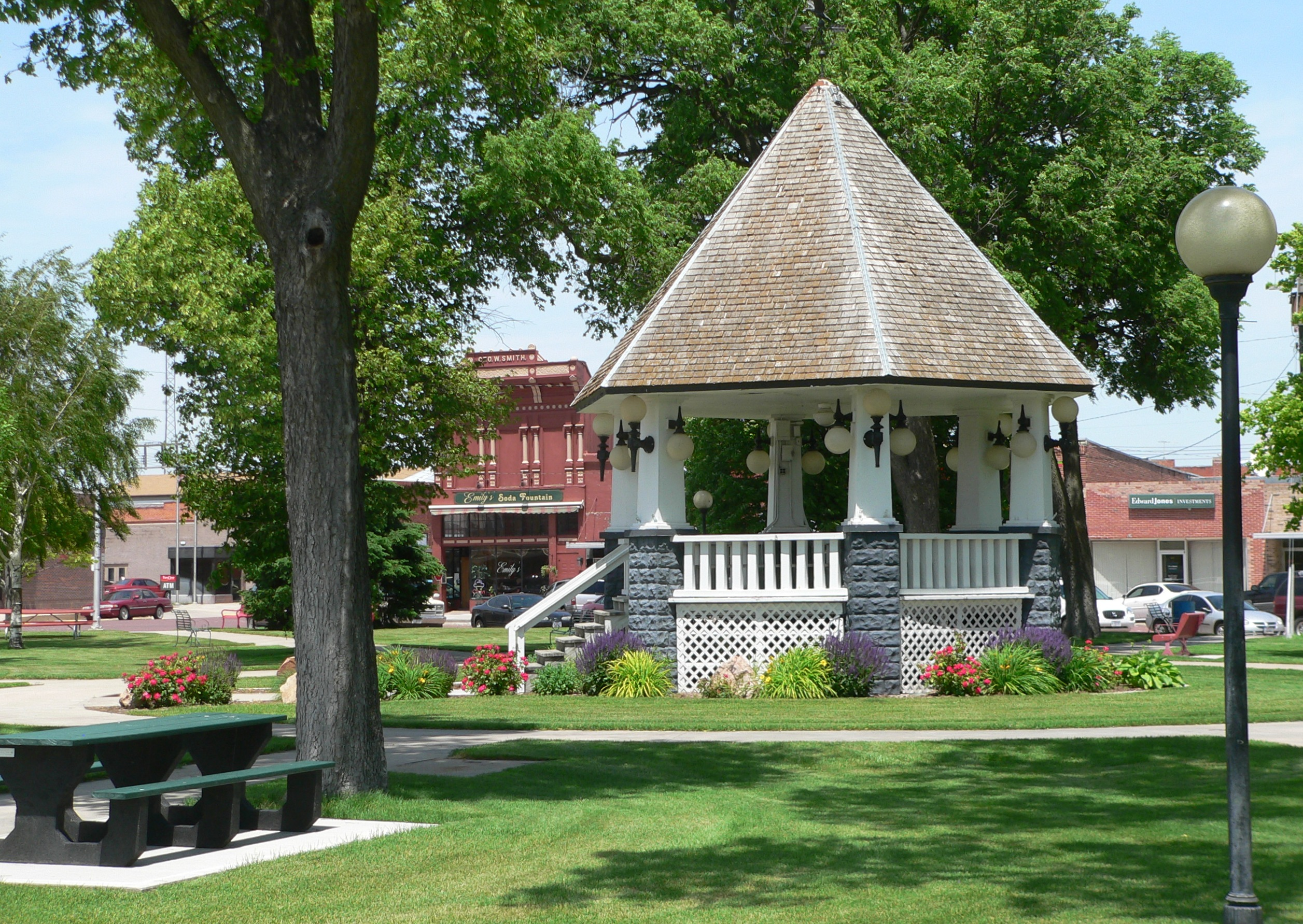
- Broken Bow Commercial Square Historic District, centered on the public square, is listed in the National Register of Historic Places.

- Location within Custer County (left) and Nebraska (right)

- Location in the United States
- Coordinates: 41°24′18″N 99°38′27″W
- Country: United States
- State: Nebraska
- County: Custer

Area
  - Total: 2.02 sq mi (5.23 km^{2})
  - Land: 2.02 sq mi (5.23 km^{2})
  - Water: 0 sq mi (0.00 km^{2})
- Elevation: 2,477 ft (755 m)

Population (2020)
  - Total: 3,506
  - Density: 1,737.5/sq mi (670.86/km^{2})
- Time zone: UTC-6 (Central (CST))
  - Summer (DST): UTC-5 (CDT)
- ZIP code: 68822
- Area code: 308
- FIPS code: 31-06610
- GNIS feature ID: 837893
- Website: cityofbrokenbow.org

Broken Bow is a city in Custer County, Nebraska, United States. As of the 2020 census, Broken Bow had a population of 3,506. It is the county seat of Custer County.

== History ==
Broken Bow was platted in 1882. Its name, likely suggested by a settler who found a broken bow in a field at the site of a former Native American camping ground, was submitted by homesteader Wilson Hewitt to the U.S. Post Office Department. The railroad was built through Broken Bow in 1884, and the town was incorporated as a village that same year. Broken Bow was incorporated as a city of the second class in 1888.

== Geography ==
According to the United States Census Bureau, the city has a total area of 1.90 square miles (4.92 km^{2}), all land.

The geographic center of Nebraska lies approximately 10 miles southwest of Broken Bow.

=== Climate ===
Climate data for Broken Bow 2 W, Nebraska (1991–2020 normals, extremes 1894–present)
Month	Jan	Feb	Mar	Apr	May	Jun	Jul	Aug	Sep	Oct	Nov	Dec	Year
Record high °F (°C)	78 (26)	79 (26)	92 (33)	99 (37)	110 (43)	107 (42)	116 (47)	113 (45)	106 (41)	98 (37)	84 (29)	77 (25)	116 (47)
Mean maximum °F (°C)	60.7 (15.9)	64.3 (17.9)	76.7 (24.8)	83.2 (28.4)	88.5 (31.4)	94.0 (34.4)	96.9 (36.1)	95.8 (35.4)	92.0 (33.3)	85.4 (29.7)	73.7 (23.2)	62.5 (16.9)	98.3 (36.8)
Mean daily maximum °F (°C)	36.9 (2.7)	40.0 (4.4)	51.0 (10.6)	60.1 (15.6)	69.9 (21.1)	80.5 (26.9)	86.1 (30.1)	84.4 (29.1)	77.1 (25.1)	63.9 (17.7)	50.1 (10.1)	39.0 (3.9)	61.6 (16.4)
Daily mean °F (°C)	24.2 (−4.3)	27.1 (−2.7)	36.9 (2.7)	46.1 (7.8)	56.7 (13.7)	67.8 (19.9)	73.1 (22.8)	71.0 (21.7)	62.4 (16.9)	48.9 (9.4)	35.8 (2.1)	26.2 (−3.2)	48.0 (8.9)
Mean daily minimum °F (°C)	11.5 (−11.4)	14.2 (−9.9)	22.8 (−5.1)	32.0 (0.0)	43.6 (6.4)	55.1 (12.8)	60.1 (15.6)	57.7 (14.3)	47.7 (8.7)	33.9 (1.1)	21.6 (−5.8)	13.4 (−10.3)	34.5 (1.4)
Mean minimum °F (°C)	−11.3 (−24.1)	−6.6 (−21.4)	4.5 (−15.3)	16.2 (−8.8)	28.7 (−1.8)	42.0 (5.6)	48.7 (9.3)	45.4 (7.4)	31.9 (−0.1)	16.7 (−8.5)	3.0 (−16.1)	−7.0 (−21.7)	−15.8 (−26.6)
Record low °F (°C)	−42 (−41)	−41 (−41)	−22 (−30)	−5 (−21)	15 (−9)	30 (−1)	37 (3)	33 (1)	16 (−9)	−1 (−18)	−23 (−31)	−30 (−34)	−42 (−41)
Average precipitation inches (mm)	0.32 (8.1)	0.47 (12)	1.29 (33)	2.52 (64)	4.03 (102)	3.73 (95)	3.12 (79)	2.48 (63)	2.03 (52)	1.83 (46)	0.72 (18)	0.50 (13)	23.04 (585)
Average snowfall inches (cm)	4.4 (11)	7.0 (18)	3.8 (9.7)	2.8 (7.1)	0.1 (0.25)	0.0 (0.0)	0.0 (0.0)	0.0 (0.0)	0.0 (0.0)	2.0 (5.1)	3.7 (9.4)	5.7 (14)	29.5 (75)
Average precipitation days (≥ 0.01 in)	3.7	4.9	6.6	9.5	10.9	10.5	8.7	7.3	6.1	6.7	4.6	3.7	83.2
Average snowy days (≥ 0.1 in)	2.4	3.2	1.4	0.8	0.0	0.0	0.0	0.0	0.0	0.7	1.5	2.3	12.3
Source: NOAA

== Demographics ==
Historical population
Census	Pop.	Note	%±
1890	1,647		—
1900	1,375		−16.5%
1910	2,260		64.4%
1920	2,567		13.6%
1930	2,715		5.8%
1940	2,968		9.3%
1950	3,396		14.4%
1960	3,482		2.5%
1970	3,734		7.2%
1980	3,979		6.6%
1990	3,778		−5.1%
2000	3,491		−7.6%
2010	3,559		1.9%
2020	3,506		−1.5%
U.S. Decennial Census; 2012 Estimate

=== 2020 census ===
As of the 2020 census, Broken Bow had a population of 3,506. The median age was 38.0 years. 25.4% of residents were under the age of 18 and 20.9% of residents were 65 years of age or older. For every 100 females there were 92.5 males, and for every 100 females age 18 and over there were 89.4 males age 18 and over.

0.0% of residents lived in urban areas, while 100.0% lived in rural areas.

There were 1,535 households in Broken Bow, of which 28.5% had children under the age of 18 living in them. Of all households, 41.7% were married-couple households, 20.3% were households with a male householder and no spouse or partner present, and 31.5% were households with a female householder and no spouse or partner present. About 39.4% of all households were made up of individuals and 18.8% had someone living alone who was 65 years of age or older.

There were 1,745 housing units, of which 12.0% were vacant. The homeowner vacancy rate was 2.6% and the rental vacancy rate was 10.3%.

Racial composition as of the 2020 census
Race	Number	Percent
White	3,176	90.6%
Black or African American	21	0.6%
American Indian and Alaska Native	24	0.7%
Asian	10	0.3%
Native Hawaiian and Other Pacific Islander	2	0.1%
Some other race	108	3.1%
Two or more races	165	4.7%
Hispanic or Latino (of any race)	228	6.5%

=== 2010 census ===
As of the census of 2010, there were 3,559 people, 1,575 households, and 909 families living in the city. The population density was 1,873.2 inhabitants per square mile (723.2/km^{2}). There were 1,730 housing units at an average density of 910.5 per square mile (351.5/km^{2}). The racial makeup of the city was 95.7% White, 0.4% African American, 0.7% Native American, 0.1% Asian, 1.3% from other races, and 1.7% from two or more races. Hispanic or Latino of any race were 2.8% of the population.

There were 1,575 households, of which 27.9% had children under the age of 18 living with them, 43.8% were married couples living together, 10.3% had a female householder with no husband present, 3.6% had a male householder with no wife present, and 42.3% were non-families. 38.7% of all households were made up of individuals, and 20.1% had someone living alone who was 65 years of age or older. The average household size was 2.19 and the average family size was 2.90.

The median age in the city was 41.9 years. 24.8% of residents were under the age of 18; 6.4% were between the ages of 18 and 24; 22.4% were from 25 to 44; 24.1% were from 45 to 64; and 22.2% were 65 years of age or older. The gender makeup of the city was 47.1% male and 52.9% female.

=== 2000 census ===
As of the census of 2000, there were 3,491 people, 1,509 households, and 917 families living in the city. The population density was 2,148.8 inhabitants per square mile (829.7/km^{2}). There were 1,721 housing units at an average density of 1,059.3 per square mile (409.0/km^{2}). The racial makeup of the city was 98.22% White, 0.17% African American, 0.66% Native American, 0.09% Asian, 0.11% from other races, and 0.74% from two or more races. Hispanic or Latino of any race were 0.80% of the population.

There were 1,509 households, out of which 27.0% had children under the age of 18 living with them, 51.2% were married couples living together, 7.9% had a female householder with no husband present, and 39.2% were non-families. 36.2% of all households were made up of individuals, and 18.8% had someone living alone who was 65 years of age or older. The average household size was 2.21 and the average family size was 2.88.

In the city, the population was spread out, with 23.9% under the age of 18, 6.2% from 18 to 24, 22.7% from 25 to 44, 22.3% from 45 to 64, and 24.9% who were 65 years of age or older. The median age was 43 years. For every 100 females, there were 84.4 males. For every 100 females age 18 and over, there were 78.3 males.

As of 2000 the median income for a household in the city was $29,355, and the median income for a family was $37,750. Males had a median income of $26,552 versus $20,132 for females. The per capita income for the city was $17,571. About 9.6% of families and 14.4% of the population were below the poverty line, including 22.8% of those under age 18 and 9.1% of those age 65 or over.

== Economy ==
Nebraska's largest cattle feedlot, the Adams Land and Cattle south lot, with a capacity of 85,000 head, is located 2 miles south of Broken Bow. In the past, some locals have feared the potential of environmental damage from the feedlot, but the state's environmental agency has found the company in compliance with state standards.

A family owned feed store, Evans Feed, opened in 1927. The town also has a grocery and a nursing home.

== Notable people ==
- Bettina Bedwell, journalist and fashion designer
- Solomon Butcher, photographer of the homestead era in central Nebraska, lived in Broken Bow from 1915 to 1926.
- Earl Cooper, race car driver in Motorsports Hall of Fame of America
- Augustin Reed Humphrey, U.S. representative from Nebraska
- Omer M. Kem, U.S. representative from Nebraska
- Kent McCloughan, football player for Nebraska and the Oakland Raiders

== In media ==
In HBO's TV medical drama The Pitt, the character Dennis Whitaker, a med student portrayed by Gerran Howell, is from Broken Bow.
