= Elim Township, Custer County, Nebraska =

Elim Township
- Township
- Location in Custer County
- Coordinates: 41°14′53″N 100°08′26″W
- Country: United States
- State: Nebraska
- County: Custer

Area
  - Total: 108.63 sq mi (281.34 km^{2})
  - Land: 108.63 sq mi (281.34 km^{2})
  - Water: 0 sq mi (0 km^{2}) 0%
- Elevation: 2,897 ft (883 m)

Population (2020)
  - Total: 110
  - Density: 1.0/sq mi (0.39/km^{2})
- GNIS feature ID: 0837980

Elim Township is one of thirty-one townships in Custer County, Nebraska, United States. The population was 110 at the 2020 census. A 2021 estimate placed the township's population at 109.

== See also ==
- County government in Nebraska
