= Corner Township, Custer County, Nebraska =

Corner Township
- Township
- Location in Custer County
- Coordinates: 41°41′52″N 099°15′52″W
- Country: United States
- State: Nebraska
- County: Custer

Area
  - Total: 35.64 sq mi (92.31 km^{2})
  - Land: 35.64 sq mi (92.31 km^{2})
  - Water: 0 sq mi (0 km^{2}) 0%
- Elevation: 2,513 ft (766 m)

Population (2020)
  - Total: 23
  - Density: 0.65/sq mi (0.25/km^{2})
- GNIS feature ID: 0837938

Corner Township is one of thirty-one townships in Custer County, Nebraska, United States. The population was 23 at the 2020 census. A 2021 estimate placed the township's population at 23.

== See also ==
- County government in Nebraska
