= Mason City, Nebraska =

- Village
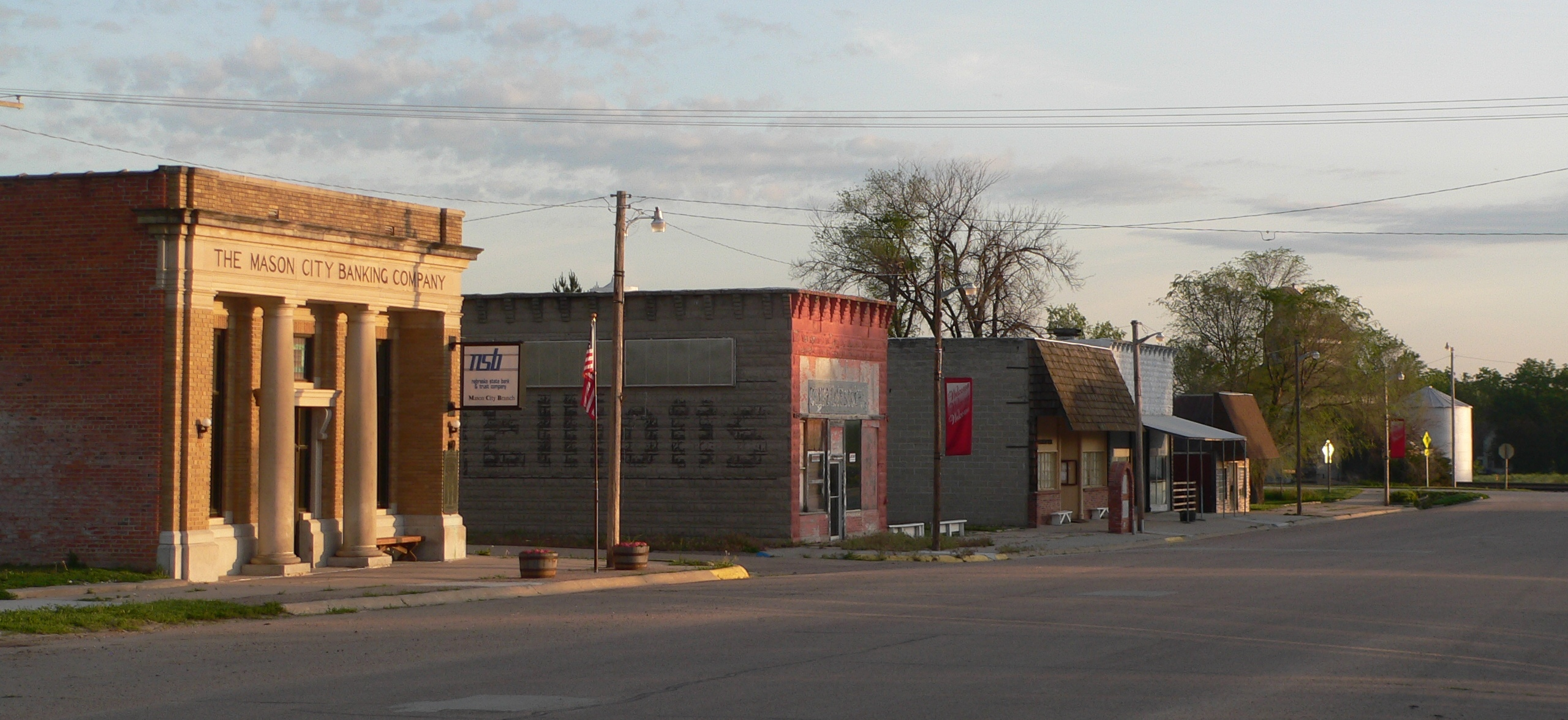
- Mason City at sunrise

- Location of Mason City, Nebraska

- Location within Nebraska Location within the United States
- Coordinates: 41°13′20″N 99°17′56″W
- Country: United States
- State: Nebraska
- County: Custer
- Township: Algernon

Area
  - Total: 0.47 sq mi (1.23 km^{2})
  - Land: 0.47 sq mi (1.23 km^{2})
  - Water: 0 sq mi (0.00 km^{2})
- Elevation: 2,264 ft (690 m)

Population (2020)
  - Total: 151
  - Density: 316.9/sq mi (122.37/km^{2})
- Time zone: UTC-6 (Central (CST))
  - Summer (DST): UTC-5 (CDT)
- ZIP code: 68855
- Area code: 308
- FIPS code: 31-31115
- GNIS feature ID: 2399271

Mason City is a village in Custer County, Nebraska, United States. As of the 2020 census, Mason City had a population of 151.

== History ==
Mason City was platted in 1886 when the Burlington and Missouri River Railroad was extended to that point. The town was named for Oliver Perry Mason, a former Nebraska Supreme Court judge.

== Geography ==
According to the United States Census Bureau, the village has a total area of 0.47 square miles (1.22 km^{2}), all land.

=== Climate ===
Climate data for Mason City, Nebraska (1991–2020)
Month	Jan	Feb	Mar	Apr	May	Jun	Jul	Aug	Sep	Oct	Nov	Dec	Year
Mean daily maximum °F (°C)	36.8 (2.7)	40.3 (4.6)	51.9 (11.1)	61.5 (16.4)	70.9 (21.6)	81.8 (27.7)	87.1 (30.6)	85.2 (29.6)	78.1 (25.6)	64.5 (18.1)	50.2 (10.1)	38.8 (3.8)	62.3 (16.8)
Daily mean °F (°C)	25.0 (−3.9)	28.0 (−2.2)	38.6 (3.7)	48.2 (9.0)	58.7 (14.8)	69.7 (20.9)	74.8 (23.8)	72.6 (22.6)	63.8 (17.7)	50.2 (10.1)	37.3 (2.9)	27.5 (−2.5)	49.5 (9.7)
Mean daily minimum °F (°C)	13.2 (−10.4)	15.7 (−9.1)	25.2 (−3.8)	35.0 (1.7)	46.5 (8.1)	57.6 (14.2)	62.5 (16.9)	60.0 (15.6)	49.5 (9.7)	35.9 (2.2)	24.4 (−4.2)	16.2 (−8.8)	36.8 (2.7)
Average precipitation inches (mm)	0.60 (15)	0.73 (19)	1.51 (38)	2.79 (71)	4.37 (111)	3.93 (100)	3.23 (82)	3.14 (80)	2.33 (59)	1.96 (50)	1.09 (28)	0.60 (15)	26.28 (668)
Average snowfall inches (cm)	6.8 (17)	6.1 (15)	3.7 (9.4)	1.2 (3.0)	0.0 (0.0)	0.0 (0.0)	0.0 (0.0)	0.0 (0.0)	0.0 (0.0)	1.7 (4.3)	1.6 (4.1)	4.8 (12)	25.9 (64.8)
Source: NOAA

== Demographics ==
Historical population
Census	Pop.	Note	%±
1900	241		—
1910	480		99.2%
1920	487		1.5%
1930	447		−8.2%
1940	396		−11.4%
1950	305		−23.0%
1960	277		−9.2%
1970	196		−29.2%
1980	196		0.0%
1990	160		−18.4%
2000	178		11.3%
2010	171		−3.9%
2020	151		−11.7%
U.S. Decennial Census

=== 2010 census ===
As of the census of 2010, there were 171 people, 75 households, and 45 families living in the village. The population density was 363.8 inhabitants per square mile (140.5/km^{2}). There were 93 housing units at an average density of 197.9 per square mile (76.4/km^{2}). The racial makeup of the village was 94.2% White, 0.6% Native American, 1.2% Asian, and 4.1% from two or more races. Hispanic or Latino of any race were 2.3% of the population.

There were 75 households, of which 22.7% had children under the age of 18 living with them, 46.7% were married couples living together, 10.7% had a female householder with no husband present, 2.7% had a male householder with no wife present, and 40.0% were non-families. 34.7% of all households were made up of individuals, and 21.3% had someone living alone who was 65 years of age or older. The average household size was 2.28 and the average family size was 2.84.

The median age in the village was 47.4 years. 21.1% of residents were under the age of 18; 7.5% were between the ages of 18 and 24; 15.8% were from 25 to 44; 40.4% were from 45 to 64; and 15.2% were 65 years of age or older. The gender makeup of the village was 47.4% male and 52.6% female.

=== 2000 census ===
As of the census of 2000, there were 178 people, 72 households, and 49 families living in the village. The population density was 377.3 inhabitants per square mile (145.7/km^{2}). There were 91 housing units at an average density of 192.9 per square mile (74.5/km^{2}). The racial makeup of the village was 94.38% White, 3.37% Native American, and 2.25% from two or more races. Hispanic or Latino of any race were 0.56% of the population.

There were 72 households, out of which 30.6% had children under the age of 18 living with them, 61.1% were married couples living together, 4.2% had a female householder with no husband present, and 30.6% were non-families. 26.4% of all households were made up of individuals, and 20.8% had someone living alone who was 65 years of age or older. The average household size was 2.47 and the average family size was 3.02.

In the village, the population was spread out, with 27.0% under the age of 18, 5.6% from 18 to 24, 19.1% from 25 to 44, 24.2% from 45 to 64, and 24.2% who were 65 years of age or older. The median age was 44 years. For every 100 females, there were 79.8 males. For every 100 females age 18 and over, there were 80.6 males.

As of 2000 the median income for a household in the village was $26,719, and the median income for a family was $29,792. Males had a median income of $24,750 versus $21,786 for females. The per capita income for the village was $12,881. About 11.1% of families and 13.3% of the population were below the poverty line, including 20.5% of those under the age of eighteen and 25.7% of those 65 or over.
