= Westerville Township, Custer County, Nebraska =

Westerville Township
- Township
- Location in Custer County
- Coordinates: 41°24′44″N 099°23′47″W
- Country: United States
- State: Nebraska
- County: Custer

Area
  - Total: 68.9 sq mi (178.4 km^{2})
  - Land: 68.9 sq mi (178.4 km^{2})
  - Water: 0 sq mi (0 km^{2}) 0%
- Elevation: 2,360 ft (720 m)

Population (2020)
  - Total: 130
  - Density: 1.9/sq mi (0.73/km^{2})
- GNIS feature ID: 0838325

Westerville Township is one of thirty-one townships in Custer County, Nebraska, United States. The population was 130 at the 2020 census. A 2021 estimate placed the township's population at 129.

== See also ==
- County government in Nebraska
