= Round Valley, Nebraska =

Unincorporated community in Nebraska, U.S.

Coordinates: 41°34′06″N 99°31′10″W

Round Valley is an unincorporated community in Custer County, Nebraska, United States.

== History ==
A post office was established at Round Valley in 1880, and remained in operation until it was discontinued in 1935.
