= Victoria Township, Custer County, Nebraska =

Victoria Township
- Township
- Location in Custer County
- Coordinates: 41°39′03″N 099°48′46″W
- Country: United States
- State: Nebraska
- County: Custer

Area
  - Total: 161.78 sq mi (419.02 km^{2})
  - Land: 161.73 sq mi (418.88 km^{2})
  - Water: 0.054 sq mi (0.14 km^{2}) 0.03%
- Elevation: 2,720 ft (829 m)

Population (2020)
  - Total: 330
  - Density: 2.0/sq mi (0.79/km^{2})
- ZIP code: 68813
- Area code: 308
- GNIS feature ID: 0838307

Victoria Township is one of thirty-one townships in Custer County, Nebraska, United States. The population was 330 at the 2020 census. A 2021 estimate placed the township's population at 326. The village of Anselmo lies within the Township.

== See also ==
- County government in Nebraska
