= Sandra Kauffman =

American politician

Member of the Missouri House of Representatives from the 45th district

Personal details
- Born: Anselmo, Nebraska, U.S.
- Party: Republican
- Education: University of Nebraska–Lincoln
- Occupation: Politician

Sandra Kauffman is a former American Republican politician who served in the Missouri House of Representatives.

Born in Anselmo, Nebraska, she attended the University of Nebraska–Lincoln.
