= Lodi, Nebraska =

Unincorporated community in Nebraska, U.S.

Coordinates: 41°12′56″N 99°51′10″W

Lodi is an unincorporated community in Custer County, Nebraska, United States.

== History ==
A post office was established at Lodi in 1882, and remained in operation until it was discontinued in 1928. The community was named after the Italian city of Lodi, Lombardy.
