= New Helena, Nebraska =

Unincorporated community in Nebraska, U.S.

Coordinates: 41°36′41″N 99°45′04″W

New Helena is an unincorporated community in Custer County, Nebraska, United States.

== History ==
A post office was established at New Helena in 1875, and remained in operation until it was discontinued in 1910.
