= Cumro, Nebraska =

Unincorporated community in Nebraska, United States

- Unincorporated Community
- Location within Nebraska Location within the United States
- Coordinates: 41.1°N 99.5°W
- Country: United States
- State: Nebraska
- County: Custer

Cumro is an unincorporated community in Custer County, Nebraska, in the United States.

== History ==
A post office was established at Cumro in 1885, and remained in operation until it was discontinued in 1943. The community was named after Cumro, Wales.
