= Walworth, Nebraska =

Unincorporated community in Nebraska, U.S.

Coordinates: 41°39′10″N 99°34′39″W

Walworth is an unincorporated community in Custer County, Nebraska, United States.

== History ==
Walworth was founded in 1892. It was named for a Nebraska lumber baron.
