= Broken Bow Township, Custer County, Nebraska =

Broken Bow Township
- Township
- Location in Custer County
- Coordinates: 41°25′05″N 099°38′18″W
- Country: United States
- State: Nebraska
- County: Custer

Area
  - Total: 124.34 sq mi (322.05 km^{2})
  - Land: 124.29 sq mi (321.91 km^{2})
  - Water: 0.054 sq mi (0.14 km^{2}) 0.04%
- Elevation: 2,510 ft (765 m)

Population (2020)
  - Total: 722
  - Density: 5.81/sq mi (2.24/km^{2})
- GNIS feature ID: 0837894

Broken Bow Township is one of thirty-one townships in Custer County, Nebraska, United States. The population was 722 at the 2020 census. A 2021 estimate placed the township's population at 718.
