= Arnold Township, Custer County, Nebraska =

Arnold Township
- Township
- Location in Custer County
- Coordinates: 41°27′15″N 100°10′09″W
- Country: United States
- State: Nebraska
- County: Custer

Area
  - Total: 138.02 sq mi (357.47 km^{2})
  - Land: 137.96 sq mi (357.32 km^{2})
  - Water: 0.054 sq mi (0.14 km^{2}) 0.04%
- Elevation: 2,831 ft (863 m)

Population (2020)
  - Total: 769
  - Density: 5.57/sq mi (2.15/km^{2})
- GNIS feature ID: 0837860

Arnold Township is one of thirty-one townships in Custer County, Nebraska, United States. The population was 769 at the 2020 census. A 2021 estimate placed the township's population at 764.

The Village of Arnold lies within the Township.

== See also ==
- County government in Nebraska
