= Lillian, Nebraska =

Unincorporated community in Nebraska, U.S.

Coordinates: 41°35′23″N 99°38′39″W

Lillian is an unincorporated community in Custer County, Nebraska, United States.

== History ==
Lillian was named for Lillian Gohean, daughter of the postmaster. The Lillian post office opened in 1883, closed in 1902, reopened in 1907, and closed permanently in 1934.
