= Elk Creek Township, Custer County, Nebraska =

Elk Creek Township
- Township
- Location in Custer County
- Coordinates: 41°06′13″N 099°19′26″W
- Country: United States
- State: Nebraska
- County: Custer

Area
  - Total: 94.99 sq mi (246.03 km^{2})
  - Land: 94.98 sq mi (245.99 km^{2})
  - Water: 0.015 sq mi (0.04 km^{2}) 0.02%
- Elevation: 2,359 ft (719 m)

Population (2020)
  - Total: 131
  - Density: 1.38/sq mi (0.533/km^{2})
- GNIS feature ID: 0837982

Elk Creek Township is one of thirty-one townships in Custer County, Nebraska, United States. The population was 131 at the 2020 census. A 2021 estimate placed the township's population at 130.

== See also ==
- County government in Nebraska
