= Algernon Township, Custer County, Nebraska =

Algernon Township
- Township
- Location in Custer County
- Coordinates: 41°13′21″N 099°18′04″W
- Country: United States
- State: Nebraska
- County: Custer

Area
  - Total: 92.4 sq mi (239.3 km^{2})
  - Land: 92.39 sq mi (239.29 km^{2})
  - Water: 0.0039 sq mi (0.01 km^{2}) 0%
- Elevation: 2,280 ft (695 m)

Population (2000)
  - Total: 332
  - Density: 3.6/sq mi (1.4/km^{2})
- GNIS feature ID: 0837848

Algernon Township is one of thirty-one townships in Custer County, Nebraska, United States. The population was 332 at the 2000 census. A 2006 estimate placed the township's population at 320.

The Village of Mason City lies within the Township.

== See also ==
- County government in Nebraska
