= Lillian Township, Custer County, Nebraska =

Lillian Township
- Township
- Location in Custer County
- Coordinates: 41°36′41″N 099°32′23″W
- Country: United States
- State: Nebraska
- County: Custer

Area
  - Total: 77.62 sq mi (201.03 km^{2})
  - Land: 77.58 sq mi (200.92 km^{2})
  - Water: 0.042 sq mi (0.11 km^{2}) 0.05%
- Elevation: 2,484 ft (757 m)

Population (2020)
  - Total: 130
  - Density: 1.7/sq mi (0.65/km^{2})
- ZIP code: 68822
- Area code: 308
- GNIS feature ID: 0838090

Lillian Township is one of thirty-one townships in Custer County, Nebraska, United States. The population was 130 at the 2020 census. A 2021 estimate placed the township's population at 129.

Lillian Township was named for Lillian Gohean, the daughter of a local postmaster.

== See also ==
- County government in Nebraska

Township: Lillian Cemetery: Lillian Family last name is spelled Goheen
