= Arnold, Nebraska =

- Village
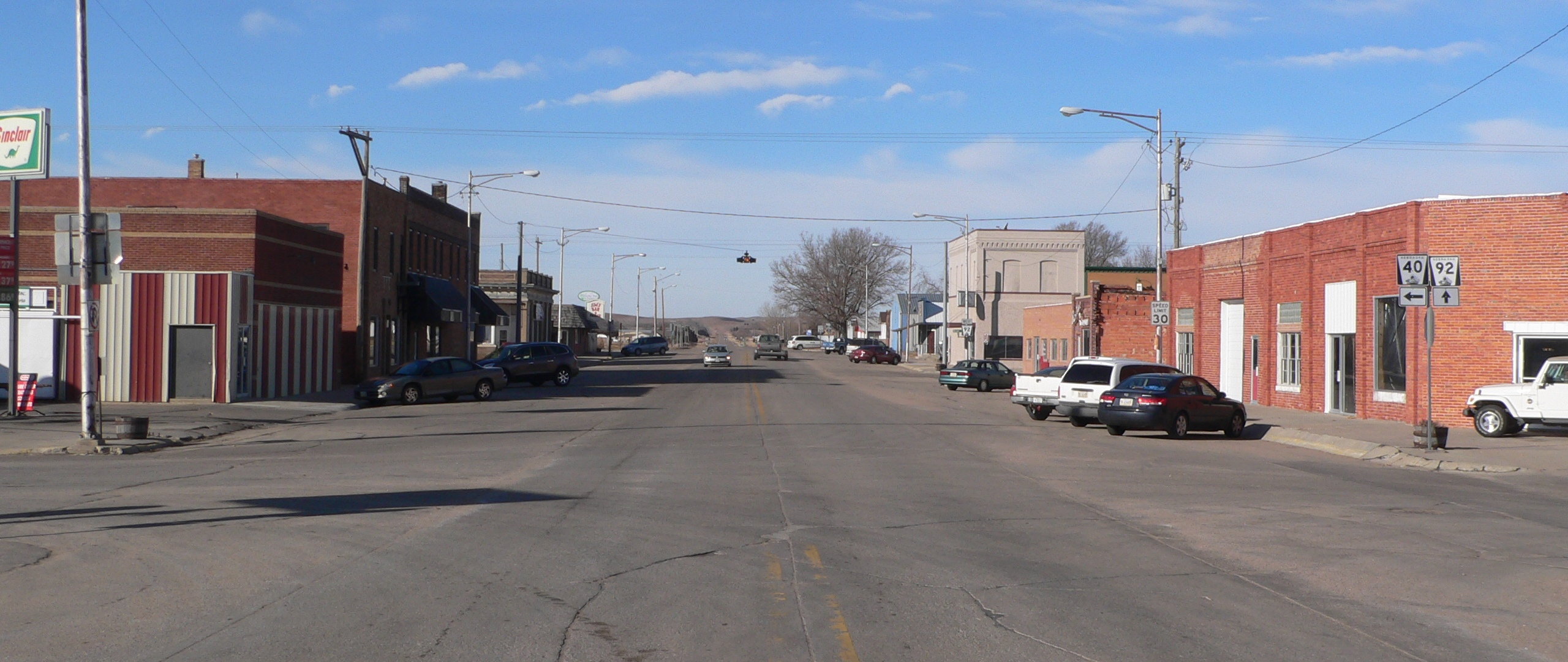
- Downtown Arnold: looking west along Arnold Avenue (Nebraska Highway 92)

- Location of Arnold, Nebraska

- Location within Nebraska Location within the United States
- Coordinates: 41°25′24″N 100°11′37″W
- Country: United States
- State: Nebraska
- County: Custer
- Township: Arnold

Area
  - Total: 0.67 sq mi (1.73 km^{2})
  - Land: 0.67 sq mi (1.73 km^{2})
  - Water: 0 sq mi (0.00 km^{2})
- Elevation: 2,704 ft (824 m)

Population (2020)
  - Total: 592
  - Density: 884/sq mi (341.3/km^{2})
- Time zone: UTC-6 (Central (CST))
  - Summer (DST): UTC-5 (CDT)
- ZIP code: 69120
- Area code: 308
- FIPS code: 31-02095
- GNIS feature ID: 2397989

Arnold is a village in Custer County, Nebraska, United States. As of the 2020 census, Arnold had a population of 592. The village was named for George Arnold, a pioneer settler.

== History ==
Arnold was laid out and platted in 1883 in anticipation that the railroad would soon be extended to that point. However, the railroad failed to materialize and Arnold grew slowly until the railroad finally arrived in 1912.

== Geography ==
According to the United States Census Bureau, the village has a total area of 0.67 square miles (1.74 km^{2}), all land.

== Climate ==
According to the Köppen Climate Classification system, Arnold has a hot-summer humid continental climate, abbreviated "Dwa" on climate maps. The hottest temperature recorded in Arnold was 106 °F (41.1 °C) on June 21, 1988, and July 20, 2006, while the coldest temperature recorded was −31 °F (−35.0 °C) on December 22, 1989.

Climate data for Arnold, Nebraska, 1991–2020 normals, extremes 1967–present
Month	Jan	Feb	Mar	Apr	May	Jun	Jul	Aug	Sep	Oct	Nov	Dec	Year
Record high °F (°C)	73 (23)	76 (24)	89 (32)	95 (35)	99 (37)	106 (41)	106 (41)	105 (41)	101 (38)	93 (34)	84 (29)	73 (23)	106 (41)
Mean maximum °F (°C)	60.2 (15.7)	64.0 (17.8)	76.9 (24.9)	83.6 (28.7)	89.8 (32.1)	93.9 (34.4)	98.1 (36.7)	96.8 (36.0)	93.0 (33.9)	86.7 (30.4)	73.0 (22.8)	62.3 (16.8)	99.7 (37.6)
Mean daily maximum °F (°C)	35.5 (1.9)	38.3 (3.5)	50.0 (10.0)	58.5 (14.7)	68.0 (20.0)	78.8 (26.0)	84.9 (29.4)	82.4 (28.0)	75.6 (24.2)	61.6 (16.4)	47.7 (8.7)	36.9 (2.7)	59.9 (15.5)
Daily mean °F (°C)	24.1 (−4.4)	26.9 (−2.8)	37.1 (2.8)	46.2 (7.9)	56.8 (13.8)	67.9 (19.9)	73.4 (23.0)	70.6 (21.4)	62.1 (16.7)	48.5 (9.2)	35.4 (1.9)	25.7 (−3.5)	47.9 (8.8)
Mean daily minimum °F (°C)	12.7 (−10.7)	15.6 (−9.1)	24.1 (−4.4)	34.0 (1.1)	45.7 (7.6)	57.0 (13.9)	62.0 (16.7)	58.8 (14.9)	48.6 (9.2)	35.4 (1.9)	23.1 (−4.9)	14.6 (−9.7)	36.0 (2.2)
Mean minimum °F (°C)	−10.2 (−23.4)	−5.5 (−20.8)	2.0 (−16.7)	18.1 (−7.7)	29.2 (−1.6)	43.6 (6.4)	48.8 (9.3)	45.9 (7.7)	32.8 (0.4)	17.4 (−8.1)	4.6 (−15.2)	−4.8 (−20.4)	−15.5 (−26.4)
Record low °F (°C)	−30 (−34)	−25 (−32)	−19 (−28)	9 (−13)	20 (−7)	34 (1)	40 (4)	37 (3)	21 (−6)	7 (−14)	−15 (−26)	−31 (−35)	−31 (−35)
Average precipitation inches (mm)	0.35 (8.9)	0.62 (16)	1.17 (30)	2.47 (63)	3.73 (95)	4.06 (103)	3.47 (88)	2.60 (66)	1.83 (46)	1.88 (48)	0.72 (18)	0.62 (16)	23.52 (597.9)
Average snowfall inches (cm)	5.4 (14)	7.2 (18)	4.2 (11)	2.7 (6.9)	0.4 (1.0)	0.0 (0.0)	0.0 (0.0)	0.0 (0.0)	0.0 (0.0)	1.2 (3.0)	3.6 (9.1)	6.1 (15)	30.8 (78)
Average precipitation days (≥ 0.01 in)	2.8	4.0	4.7	6.7	8.5	9.4	8.0	6.1	4.9	5.4	3.4	2.5	66.4
Average snowy days (≥ 0.1 in)	2.4	3.1	2.1	0.8	0.1	0.0	0.0	0.0	0.0	0.7	1.6	2.3	13.1
Source 1: NOAA
Source 2: National Weather Service

== Demographics ==
Historical population
Census	Pop.	Note	%±
1910	231		—
1920	933		303.9%
1930	899		−3.6%
1940	884		−1.7%
1950	936		5.9%
1960	844		−9.8%
1970	752		−10.9%
1980	813		8.1%
1990	679		−16.5%
2000	630		−7.2%
2010	597		−5.2%
2020	592		−0.8%
U.S. Decennial Census

=== 2010 census ===
As of the census of 2010, there were 597 people, 295 households, and 166 families living in the village. The population density was 891.0 inhabitants per square mile (344.0/km^{2}). There were 348 housing units at an average density of 519.4 per square mile (200.5/km^{2}). The racial makeup of the village was 98.5% White, 0.2% African American, 0.3% from other races, and 1.0% from two or more races. Hispanic or Latino of any race were 1.8% of the population.

There were 295 households, of which 20.3% had children under the age of 18 living with them, 47.8% were married couples living together, 5.4% had a female householder with no husband present, 3.1% had a male householder with no wife present, and 43.7% were non-families. 41.4% of all households were made up of individuals, and 21.7% had someone living alone who was 65 years of age or older. The average household size was 2.02 and the average family size was 2.71.

The median age in the village was 48.3 years. 19.9% of residents were under the age of 18; 6.6% were between the ages of 18 and 24; 19.2% were from 25 to 44; 28.1% were from 45 to 64; and 26.3% were 65 years of age or older. The gender makeup of the village was 49.1% male and 50.9% female.

=== 2000 census ===
As of the census of 2000, there were 630 people, 303 households, and 180 families living in the village. The population density was 814.7 inhabitants per square mile (314.6/km^{2}). There were 351 housing units at an average density of 453.9 per square mile (175.3/km^{2}). The racial makeup of the village was 98.73% White, 0.48% Native American, 0.48% from other races, and 0.32% from two or more races. Hispanic or Latino of any race were 1.75% of the population.

There were 303 households, out of which 25.4% had children under the age of 18 living with them, 52.1% were married couples living together, 5.6% had a female householder with no husband present, and 40.3% were non-families. 37.6% of all households were made up of individuals, and 20.5% had someone living alone who was 65 years of age or older. The average household size was 2.08 and the average family size was 2.73.

In the village, the population was spread out, with 23.0% under the age of 18, 5.7% from 18 to 24, 22.5% from 25 to 44, 23.8% from 45 to 64, and 24.9% who were 65 years of age or older. The median age was 44 years. For every 100 females, there were 90.3 males. For every 100 females age 18 and over, there were 84.4 males.

As of 2000 the median income for a household in the village was $25,500, and the median income for a family was $35,875. Males had a median income of $24,375 versus $21,339 for females. The per capita income for the village was $18,574. About 10.1% of families and 14.8% of the population were below the poverty line, including 28.2% of those under age 18 and 8.3% of those age 65 or over.
