= Sargent Township, Custer County, Nebraska =

Sargent Township
- Township
- Location in Custer County
- Coordinates: 41°40′24″N 099°22′15″W
- Country: United States
- State: Nebraska
- County: Custer

Area
  - Total: 58.25 sq mi (150.86 km^{2})
  - Land: 58.23 sq mi (150.81 km^{2})
  - Water: 0.019 sq mi (0.05 km^{2}) 0.03%
- Elevation: 2,359 ft (719 m)

Population (2020)
  - Total: 619
  - Density: 10.6/sq mi (4.10/km^{2})
- GNIS feature ID: 0838230

Sargent Township is one of thirty-one townships in Custer County, Nebraska, United States. The population was 619 at the 2020 census. A 2021 estimate placed the township's population at 613.

The City of Sargent lies within the Township.

== See also ==
- County government in Nebraska
