= Custer Township =

Custer Township may refer to:

- Custer Township, Will County, Illinois
- Custer Township, Decatur County, Kansas
- Custer Township, Mitchell County, Kansas, in Mitchell County, Kansas
- Custer Township, Antrim County, Michigan
- Custer Township, Mason County, Michigan
- Custer Township, Sanilac County, Michigan
- Custer Township, Lyon County, Minnesota
- Custer Township, Antelope County, Nebraska
- Custer Township, Custer County, Nebraska
- Custer Township, Morton County, North Dakota
- Custer Township, Beadle County, South Dakota, in Beadle County, South Dakota
- Custer Township, Corson County, South Dakota, in Corson County, South Dakota
