= Cliff Township, Custer County, Nebraska =

Cliff Township
- Township
- Location in Custer County
- Coordinates: 41°29′18″N 099°58′18″W
- Country: United States
- State: Nebraska
- County: Custer

Area
  - Total: 99.47 sq mi (257.62 km^{2})
  - Land: 99.46 sq mi (257.61 km^{2})
  - Water: 0.0039 sq mi (0.01 km^{2}) 0%
- Elevation: 3,002 ft (915 m)

Population (2020)
  - Total: 127
  - Density: 1.28/sq mi (0.493/km^{2})
- GNIS feature ID: 0837929

Cliff Township is one of thirty-one townships in Custer County, Nebraska, United States. The population was 127 at the 2020 census. A 2021 estimate placed the township's population at 126.

== See also ==
- County government in Nebraska
