= Wayne Township, Custer County, Nebraska =

Wayne Township
- Township
- Location in Custer County
- Coordinates: 41°06′56″N 100°08′36″W
- Country: United States
- State: Nebraska
- County: Custer

Area
  - Total: 80.76 sq mi (209.17 km^{2})
  - Land: 80.76 sq mi (209.17 km^{2})
  - Water: 0 sq mi (0 km^{2}) 0%
- Elevation: 2,782 ft (848 m)

Population (2020)
  - Total: 117
  - Density: 1.45/sq mi (0.559/km^{2})
- GNIS feature ID: 0838320

Wayne Township is one of thirty-one townships in Custer County, Nebraska, United States. The population was 117 at the 2020 census. A 2021 estimate placed the township's population at 116.

== See also ==
- County government in Nebraska
