= Weissert, Nebraska =

Unincorporated community in Nebraska, U.S.

Coordinates: 41°28′02″N 99°26′35″W

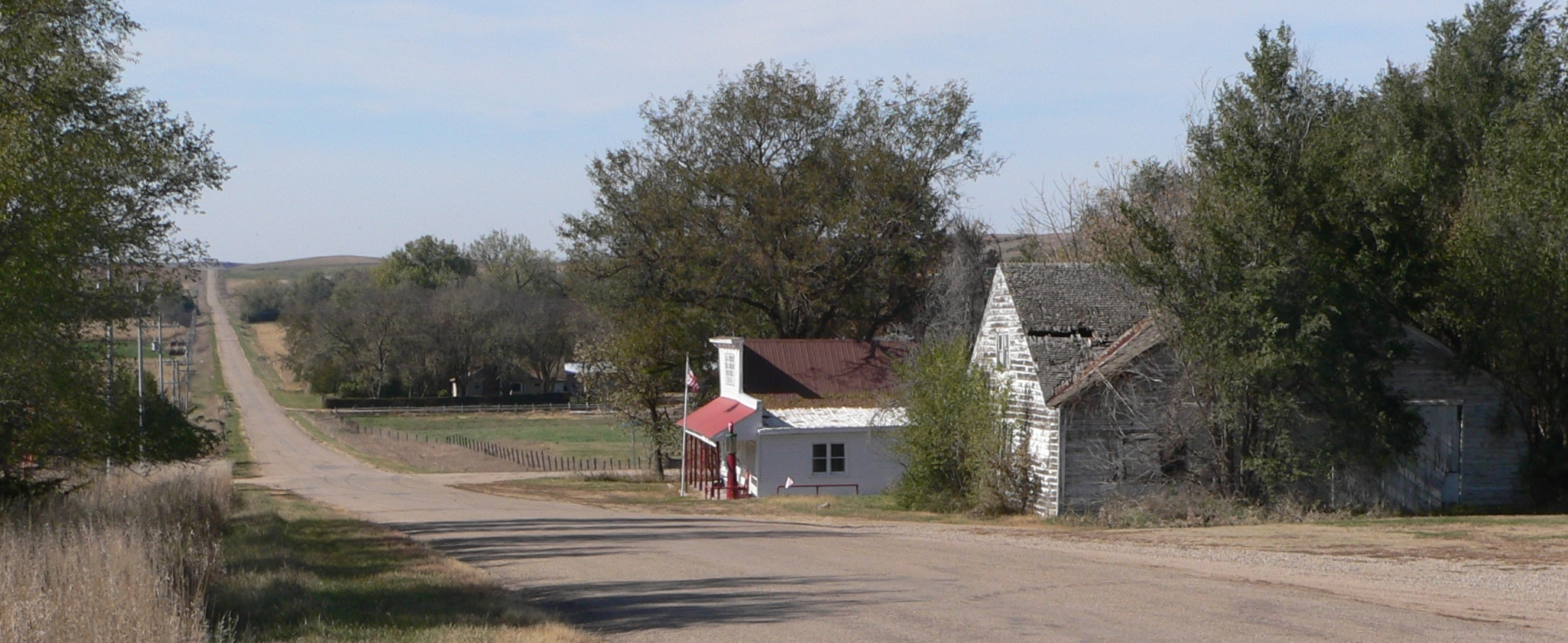
Weissert, Custer County, Nebraska, United States

Weissert is an unincorporated community in Custer County, Nebraska, United States.

== History ==
The first post office in Weissert was established in 1892.
