= Milburn Township, Custer County, Nebraska =

Milburn Township
- Township
- Location in Custer County
- Coordinates: 41°42′24″N 099°38′29″W
- Country: United States
- State: Nebraska
- County: Custer

Area
  - Total: 45.34 sq mi (117.44 km^{2})
  - Land: 45.3 sq mi (117.4 km^{2})
  - Water: 0.015 sq mi (0.04 km^{2}) 0.03%
- Elevation: 2,539 ft (774 m)

Population (2020)
  - Total: 64
  - Density: 1.4/sq mi (0.55/km^{2})
- GNIS feature ID: 0838139

Milburn Township is one of thirty-one civil townships in Custer County, Nebraska, United States. The population was 64 at the 2020 census. A 2021 estimate placed the township's population at 63.

== Communities ==
Milburn

== See also ==
- County government in Nebraska
