= Gates, Nebraska =

Unincorporated hamlet in Nebraska, U.S.

Coordinates: 41°38′25″N 99°38′09″W

Gates is an unincorporated community in Custer County, Nebraska, United States.

== History ==
Gates was named in honor of an early settler. A post office was established at Gates in 1884, and remained in operation until it was discontinued in 1989.
