= Ryno Township, Custer County, Nebraska =

Ryno Township
- Township
- Location in Custer County
- Coordinates: 41°20′28″N 099°48′32″W
- Country: United States
- State: Nebraska
- County: Custer

Area
  - Total: 54.17 sq mi (140.29 km^{2})
  - Land: 54.16 sq mi (140.28 km^{2})
  - Water: 0.0039 sq mi (0.01 km^{2}) 0.01%
- Elevation: 2,635 ft (803 m)

Population (2020)
  - Total: 96
  - Density: 1.8/sq mi (0.68/km^{2})
- GNIS feature ID: 0838222

Ryno Township is one of thirty-one townships in Custer County, Nebraska, United States. The population was 96 at the 2020 census. A 2021 estimate placed the township's population at 95.

== See also ==
- County government in Nebraska
