= Delight Township, Custer County, Nebraska =

Delight Township
- Township
- Location in Custer County
- Coordinates: 41°15′08″N 099°57′35″W
- Country: United States
- State: Nebraska
- County: Custer

Area
  - Total: 77.10 sq mi (199.68 km^{2})
  - Land: 77.10 sq mi (199.68 km^{2})
  - Water: 0 sq mi (0 km^{2}) 0%
- Elevation: 2,700 ft (823 m)

Population (2020)
  - Total: 706
  - Density: 9.16/sq mi (3.54/km^{2})
- ZIP code: 68825
- Area code: 308
- GNIS feature ID: 0837960

Delight Township is one of thirty-one townships in Custer County, Nebraska, United States. The population was 706 at the 2020 census. A 2021 estimate placed the township's population at 702.

The Village of Callaway lies within the Township.

== See also ==
- County government in Nebraska
