= Myrtle Township, Custer County, Nebraska =

Myrtle Township
- Township
- Location in Custer County
- Coordinates: 41°22′32″N 099°15′45″W
- Country: United States
- State: Nebraska
- County: Custer

Area
  - Total: 54.18 sq mi (140.33 km^{2})
  - Land: 54.18 sq mi (140.33 km^{2})
  - Water: 0 sq mi (0 km^{2}) 0%
- Elevation: 2,270 ft (692 m)

Population (2020)
  - Total: 99
  - Density: 1.8/sq mi (0.71/km^{2})
- GNIS feature ID: 0838150

Myrtle Township is one of thirty-one townships in Custer County, Nebraska, United States. The population was 99 at the 2020 census. A 2021 estimate placed the township's population at 98.

== See also ==
- County government in Nebraska
