= Douglas Grove Township, Custer County, Nebraska =

Douglas Grove Township
- Township
- Location in Custer County
- Coordinates: 41°32′56″N 099°21′23″W
- Country: United States
- State: Nebraska
- County: Custer

Area
  - Total: 66.95 sq mi (173.39 km^{2})
  - Land: 66.93 sq mi (173.36 km^{2})
  - Water: 0.0077 sq mi (0.02 km^{2}) 0.01%
- Elevation: 2,454 ft (748 m)

Population (2020)
  - Total: 77
  - Density: 1.2/sq mi (0.44/km^{2})
- ZIP code: 68828
- Area code: 308
- GNIS feature ID: 0837968

Douglas Grove Township is one of thirty-one townships in Custer County, Nebraska, United States. The population was 77 at the 2020 census. A 2021 estimate placed the township's population at 76.

Douglas Grove Township was named for Edward Douglass, a pioneer settler.

== See also ==
- County government in Nebraska
