= Sargent, Nebraska =

- City
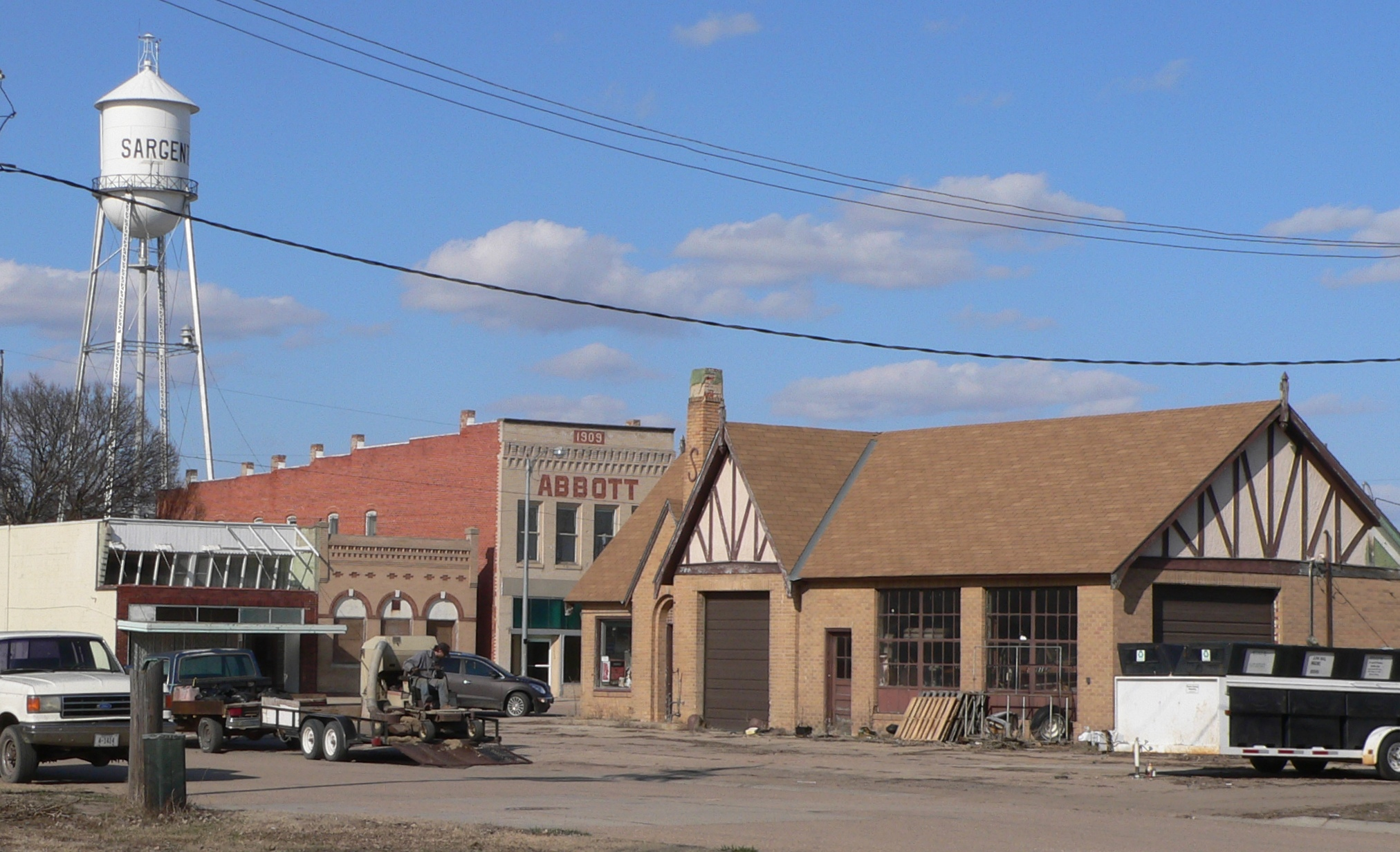
- Downtown Sargent

- Location of Sargent, Nebraska

- Location within Nebraska Location within the United States
- Coordinates: 41°38′24″N 99°22′07″W
- Country: United States
- State: Nebraska
- County: Custer
- Township: Sargent

Area
  - Total: 1.08 sq mi (2.81 km^{2})
  - Land: 1.08 sq mi (2.81 km^{2})
  - Water: 0 sq mi (0.00 km^{2})
- Elevation: 2,313 ft (705 m)

Population (2020)
  - Total: 500
  - Density: 460/sq mi (177.8/km^{2})
- Time zone: UTC-6 (Central (CST))
  - Summer (DST): UTC-5 (CDT)
- ZIP code: 68874
- Area code: 308
- FIPS code: 31-43685
- GNIS feature ID: 2396538

Sargent is a city in Custer County, Nebraska, United States. As of the 2020 census, Sargent had a population of 500.

== History ==
Sargent was laid out in 1883 by future Governor Ezra P. Savage.

Mrs. Ruth Sherman established a post office in 1879. The office was located in a soddy one half mile east of the now corporate limits of town. She chose the name "Sargent" in honor of her close friends, Mr. and Mrs. E.D. Sargent of Streator, IL.

J.K. Spacht built the first store in what is now Sargent, in July 1883, in the middle of a wheat field. After establishment of this general store, Mr. Spacht was able to persuade Mrs. Sherman to let him move her post office to his store if the name would remain "Sargent".

The town experienced rapid growth when the railroad extended to it in 1899.

== Geography ==
According to the United States Census Bureau, the city has a total area of 1.07 square miles (2.77 km^{2}), all land.

Sargent is located on U.S. Route 183 (Ord Street) and is close to the geographic center of Nebraska. It lies next to the Middle Loup River.

== Demographics ==
Historical population
Census	Pop.	Note	%±
1900	250		—
1910	651		160.4%
1920	1,078		65.6%
1930	834		−22.6%
1940	847		1.6%
1950	818		−3.4%
1960	876		7.1%
1970	789		−9.9%
1980	828		4.9%
1990	710		−14.3%
2000	649		−8.6%
2010	525		−19.1%
2020	500		−4.8%
U.S. Decennial Census; 2018 Estimate

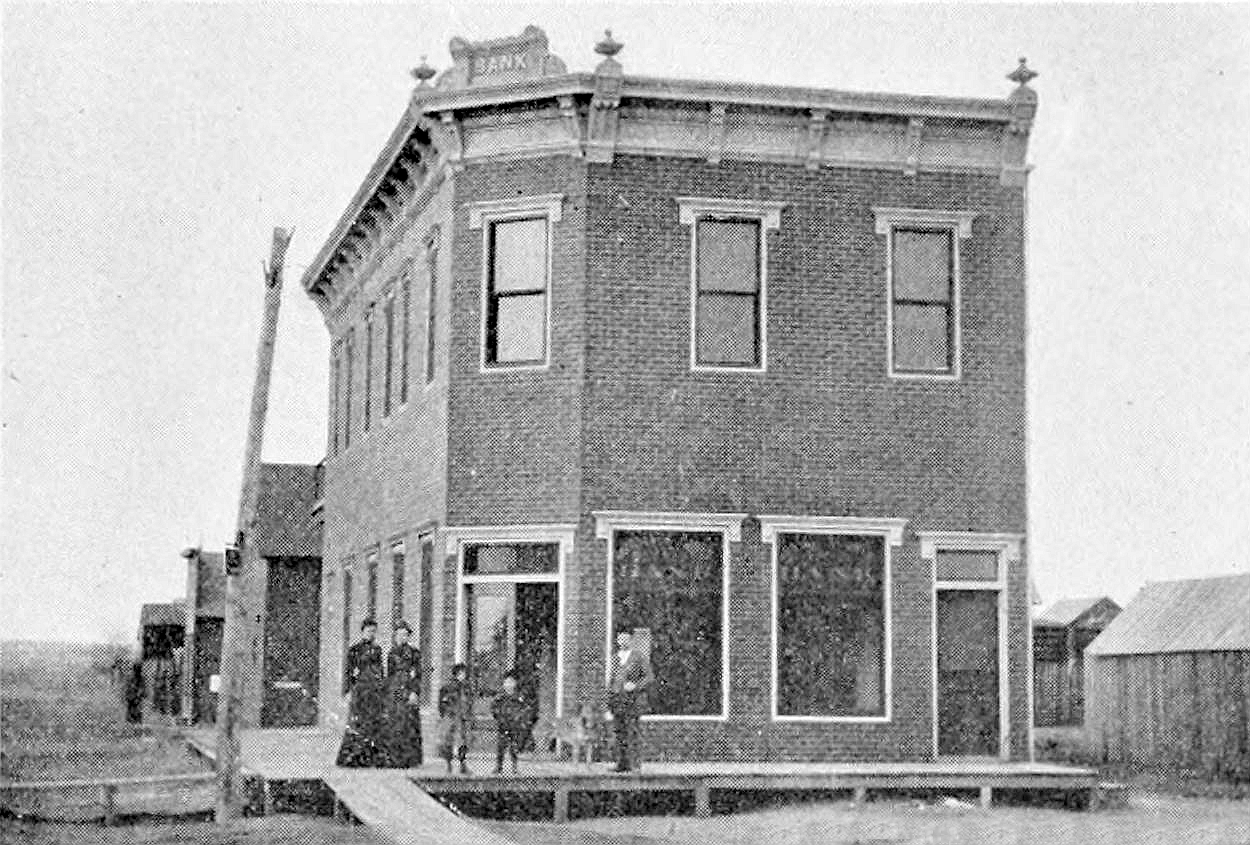
Custer County Bank in Sargent, 1901

=== 2010 census ===
As of the census of 2010, there were 525 people, 245 households, and 148 families living in the city. The population density was 490.7 inhabitants per square mile (189.5/km^{2}). There were 318 housing units at an average density of 297.2 per square mile (114.7/km^{2}). The racial makeup of the city was 99.0% White, 0.6% African American, 0.2% Asian, and 0.2% from two or more races. Hispanic or Latino of any race were 1.5% of the population.

There were 245 households, of which 25.7% had children under the age of 18 living with them, 48.2% were married couples living together, 8.6% had a female householder with no husband present, 3.7% had a male householder with no wife present, and 39.6% were non-families. 36.3% of all households were made up of individuals, and 20% had someone living alone who was 65 years of age or older. The average household size was 2.14 and the average family size was 2.76.

The median age in the city was 47.6 years. 22.9% of residents were under the age of 18; 6.5% were between the ages of 18 and 24; 17.2% were from 25 to 44; 28.5% were from 45 to 64; and 25% were 65 years of age or older. The gender makeup of the city was 50.1% male and 49.9% female.

=== 2000 census ===
As of the census of 2000, there were 649 people, 279 households, and 174 families living in the city. The population density was 730.3 inhabitants per square mile (282.0/km^{2}). There were 341 housing units at an average density of 383.7 per square mile (148.1/km^{2}). The racial makeup of the city was 97.84% White, 0.77% Native American, 0.31% Asian, 0.77% from other races, and 0.31% from two or more races. Hispanic or Latino of any race were 2.16% of the population.

There were 279 households, out of which 23.3% had children under the age of 18 living with them, 53.0% were married couples living together, 7.9% had a female householder with no husband present, and 37.6% were non-families. 37.6% of all households were made up of individuals, and 22.9% had someone living alone who was 65 years of age or older. The average household size was 2.18 and the average family size was 2.83.

In the city, the population was spread out, with 23.0% under the age of 18, 4.6% from 18 to 24, 20.2% from 25 to 44, 21.1% from 45 to 64, and 31.1% who were 65 years of age or older. The median age was 47 years. For every 100 females, there were 88.1 males. For every 100 females age 18 and over, there were 79.9 males.

As of 2000 the median income for a household in the city was $24,559, and the median income for a family was $30,714. Males had a median income of $24,135 versus $21,750 for females. The per capita income for the city was $13,962. About 16.1% of families and 16.3% of the population were below the poverty line, including 23.3% of those under age 18 and 7.4% of those age 65 or over.
