= Burton, West Virginia =

Unincorporated community in West Virginia, United States

Burton
- Unincorporated community
- Location within the state of West Virginia Burton (the United States)
- Coordinates: 39°39′50″N 80°25′50″W
- Country: United States
- State: West Virginia
- County: Wetzel
- Time zone: UTC-5 (Eastern (EST))
  - Summer (DST): UTC-4 (EDT)
- ZIP code: 26562

Nestled in the foothills of the Appalachian Mountains, Burton is an unincorporated community in Wetzel County, West Virginia, United States.

== Roads ==
Burton is located on a stretch of highway where both WV Route 7 and US Route 250 join for a few short miles between Cottontown and Hundred. These two roads are responsible for the majority of traffic to and from the area and provide important connections to New Martinsville to the west (approximately 45 minutes by car); Fairmont to the southeast (approx. 45 minutes); Morgantown, to the west (approx. 60 minutes); and Moundsville to the northeast (approx. 70 minutes). Other important connections include WV Route 69 North into Pennsylvania, where it becomes PA Route 18 and leads towards Waynesburg (approx 45 minutes) and beyond to Pittsburgh (approx 90-120 mins, traffic dependent). Pittsburgh International Airport, is the nearest intercontinental airport, while Burton is also served by a smaller regional airport, Morgantown Municipal Airport.

== History ==
It is thought to be named for George Bartrug, who settled here circa 1812. The name difference may be due to an apparent misreading of the name by railway officials. Due to its distance from the county seat and other settled areas, Burton had a major role in period lawlessness lasting through the 1870s, including thieves, houses of ill repute, gambling, and saloons. A band of concerned citizens formed the Redman Gang and helped drive crime from the area. The area remained sparsely settled until the B&O Railroad was constructed through the community in 1852, but later became an important stop on the railroad, serving as a supply depot for extraction of natural resources.

== Geography ==
=== Train tracks ===
The train tracks that once ran through Burton are long gone, and the right-of-way is now owned by Consol Coal. The rail bed connects to the East Wetzel Rail Trail in Hundred, WV, and is commonly used by hikers, bikers, and ATV enthusiasts.

The rail bed runs adjacent to Fish Creek, a small waterway that drains Burton and other local communities, eventually flowing into the Ohio River to drain into the Mississippi River basin.

=== Businesses ===
Businesses located in Burton include Whitehill's Auto Body, a body shop that can perform most automotive repairs, including mounting tires, brakes and shocks, exhaust work, and is an official West Virginia Inspection Station. They also offer a 3 bay self-service car wash, and a small used car sales lot.

The community has one church, Harmony Baptist Church, which has been active for over 150 years. It is located on a knoll overlooking the western half of the community, and has a cemetery located adjacent.

Local major industry includes the production of oil and gas, underground coal mining, and timber.

=== Park ===
There is a small roadside park, notable for its large quarried stone rollers that sit on stands by the road. The turnoff for the park also leads to the former United States Post Office, which was closed in 2011 and replaced with extended delivery and a drop box.

== Services ==
Burton is currently not included in any major cell phone carrier's advertised service area, although CDMA customers may get minimal reception in the area from towers located near Fairview, WV, and Mannington, WV. There are no GSM towers located nearby.

Telephone service is available through Frontier Communications, which also offers high-speed DSL internet in the area.

Natural gas is provided by Dominion, and power is offered through Allegheny Power, now merged with First Energy Services.

Children in Burton attend Long Drain School, a K-8 school located several miles away on Route 7, or Hundred High School, located just down the road in Hundred.

Next door to the park is the former Burton School, now The Community Health Center, known locally as "The Burton Clinic." For more serious health care needs, Burton is served by Wetzel County Hospital, Mon General Hospital, and Ruby Memorial Hospital, all approximately an hour away by ambulance.
