= East Custer Township, Custer County, Nebraska =

East Custer Township
- Township
- Location in Custer County
- Coordinates: 41°15′37″N 099°37′28″W
- Country: United States
- State: Nebraska
- County: Custer

Area
  - Total: 53.87 sq mi (139.52 km^{2})
  - Land: 53.87 sq mi (139.52 km^{2})
  - Water: 0 sq mi (0 km^{2}) 0%
- Elevation: 2,487 ft (758 m)

Population (2020)
  - Total: 33
  - Density: 0.61/sq mi (0.24/km^{2})
- GNIS feature ID: 0837971

East Custer Township is one of thirty-one townships in Custer County, Nebraska, United States. The population was 33 at the 2020 census. A 2021 estimate placed the township's population at 33. Population of about 48 in 2017.

== See also ==
- County government in Nebraska
