= Anselmo, Nebraska =

Village in Custer County, Nebraska, United States

- Village
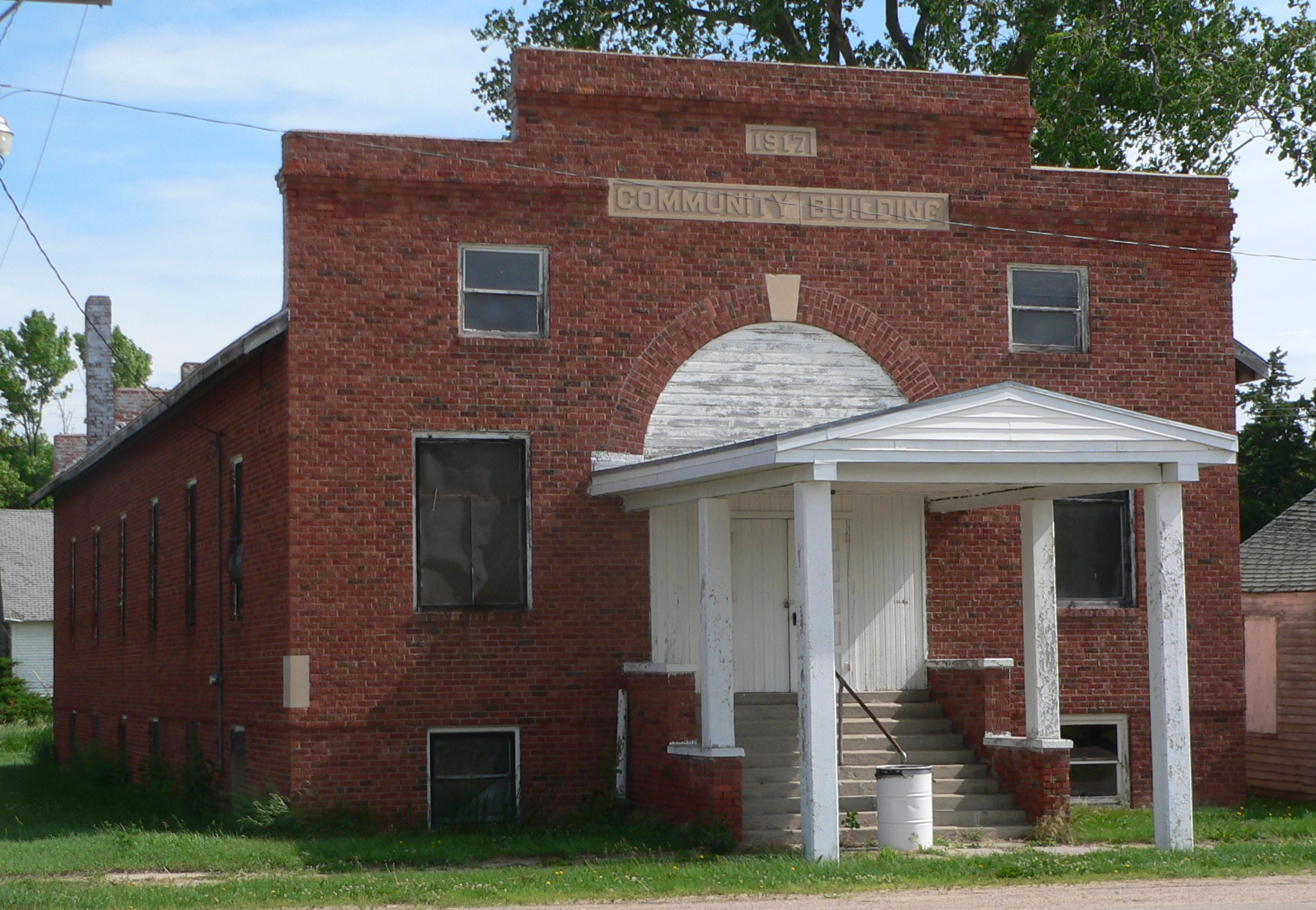
- Anselmo community building, June 2010

- Location of Anselmo, Nebraska

- Location within Nebraska Location within the United States
- Coordinates: 41°37′07″N 99°51′52″W
- Country: United States
- State: Nebraska
- County: Custer
- Township: Victoria

Area
  - Total: 0.27 sq mi (0.69 km^{2})
  - Land: 0.27 sq mi (0.69 km^{2})
  - Water: 0 sq mi (0.00 km^{2})
- Elevation: 2,605 ft (794 m)

Population (2020)
  - Total: 108
  - Density: 406.4/sq mi (156.93/km^{2})
- Time zone: UTC-6 (Central (CST))
  - Summer (DST): UTC-5 (CDT)
- ZIP code: 68813
- Area code: 308
- FIPS code: 31-01500
- GNIS feature ID: 2397966

Anselmo is a village in Custer County, Nebraska, United States. As of the 2020 census, Anselmo had a population of 108.

== History ==
Anselmo was platted in 1886 when the Burlington and Missouri River Railroad was extended to that point. It was named for Anselmo B. Smith, a railroad official.

== Demographics ==
Historical population
Census	Pop.	Note	%±
1900	145		—
1910	351		142.1%
1920	457		30.2%
1930	472		3.3%
1940	388		−17.8%
1950	316		−18.6%
1960	269		−14.9%
1970	180		−33.1%
1980	187		3.9%
1990	189		1.1%
2000	159		−15.9%
2010	145		−8.8%
2020	108		−25.5%
U.S. Decennial Census

=== 2010 census ===
As of the census of 2010, there were 145 people, 62 households, and 44 families living in the village. The population density was 537.0 inhabitants per square mile (207.3/km^{2}). There were 71 housing units at an average density of 263.0 per square mile (101.5/km^{2}). The racial makeup of the village was 98.6% White and 1.4% from two or more races. Hispanic or Latino people of any race were 2.8% of the population.

There were 62 households, of which 27.4% had children under the age of 18 living with them, 51.6% were married couples living together, 12.9% had a female householder with no husband present, 6.5% had a male householder with no wife present, and 29.0% were non-families. 27.4% of all households were made up of individuals, and 14.5% had someone living alone who was 65 years of age or older. The average household size was 2.34 and the average family size was 2.77.

The median age in the village was 45.5 years. 23.4% of residents were under the age of 18; 6.2% were between the ages of 18 and 24; 18.6% were from 25 to 44; 27.7% were from 45 to 64; and 24.1% were 65 years of age or older. The gender makeup of the village was 55.2% male and 44.8% female.

=== 2000 census ===
As of the census of 2000, there were 159 people, 68 households, and 46 families living in the village. The population density was 598.6 inhabitants per square mile (231.1/km^{2}). There were 80 housing units at an average density of 301.2 per square mile (116.3/km^{2}). The racial makeup of the village was 98.11% White, 0.63% Native American, and 1.26% from two or more races.

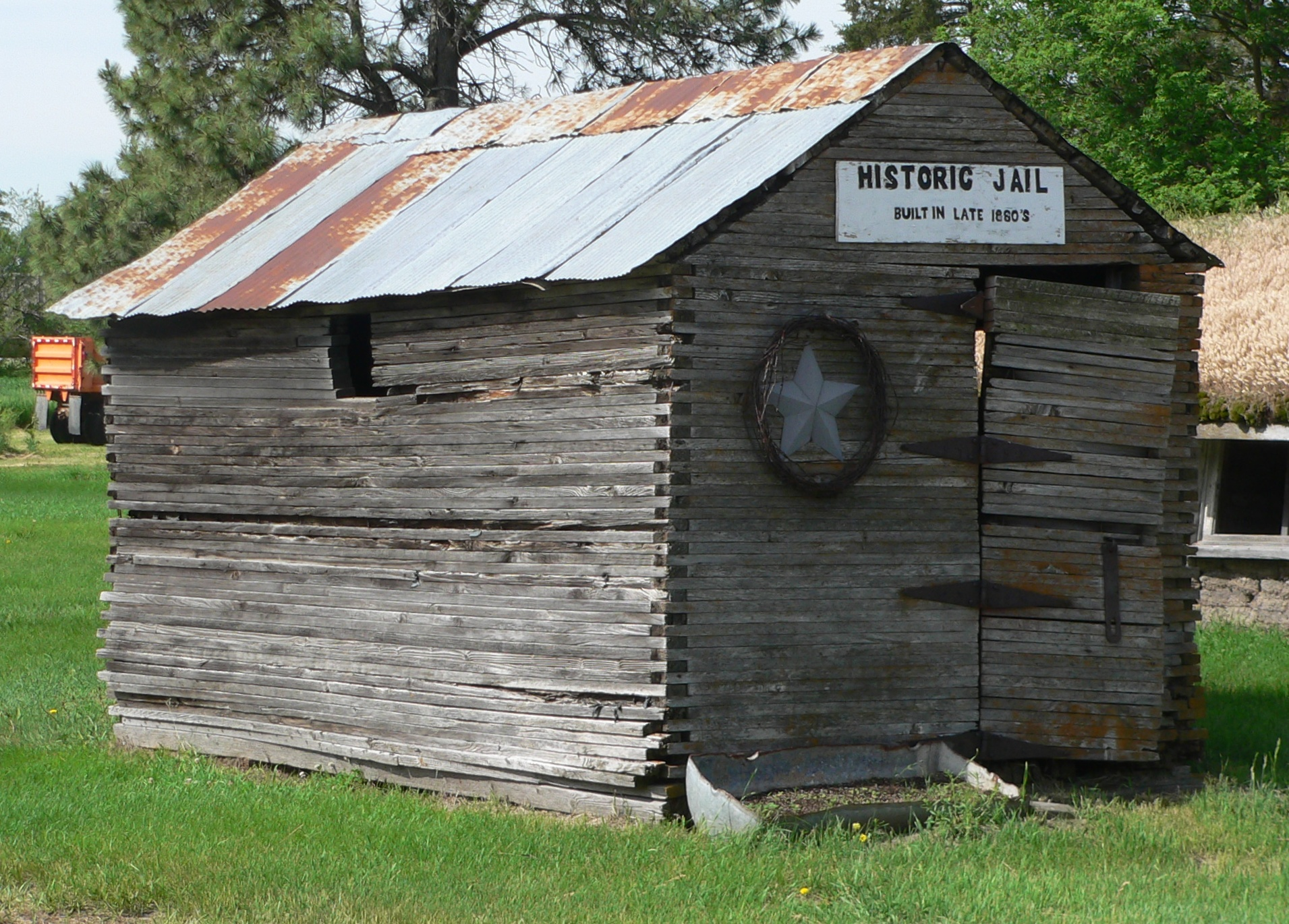
Historic jail in Anselmo, June 2010

There were 68 households, out of which 26.5% had children under the age of 18 living with them, 52.9% were married couples living together, 10.3% had a female householder with no husband present, and 30.9% were non-families. 29.4% of all households were made up of individuals, and 7.4% had someone living alone who was 65 years of age or older. The average household size was 2.34 and the average family size was 2.87.

In the village, the population was spread out, with 25.2% under the age of 18, 8.2% from 18 to 24, 25.8% from 25 to 44, 24.5% from 45 to 64, and 16.4% who were 65 years of age or older. The median age was 40 years. For every 100 females, there were 106.5 males. For every 100 females age 18 and over, there were 101.7 males.

As of 2000 the median income for a household in the village was $28,281, and the median income for a family was $40,417. Males had a median income of $23,750 versus $11,750 for females. The per capita income for the village was $13,892. About 9.1% of families and 10.0% of the population were below the poverty line, including 7.3% of those under the age of eighteen and none of those 65 or over.

== Geography ==
According to the United States Census Bureau, the village has a total area of 0.27 square miles (0.70 km^{2}), all land.

=== Climate ===
Climate data for Anselmo 2 WSW, Nebraska (1991–2020 normals, extremes 1962–present)
Month	Jan	Feb	Mar	Apr	May	Jun	Jul	Aug	Sep	Oct	Nov	Dec	Year
Record high °F (°C)	73 (23)	78 (26)	88 (31)	93 (34)	99 (37)	105 (41)	108 (42)	109 (43)	101 (38)	94 (34)	84 (29)	72 (22)	109 (43)
Mean maximum °F (°C)	60.9 (16.1)	63.8 (17.7)	76.8 (24.9)	83.3 (28.5)	89.0 (31.7)	94.6 (34.8)	97.8 (36.6)	96.4 (35.8)	92.7 (33.7)	85.7 (29.8)	74.3 (23.5)	63.5 (17.5)	99.2 (37.3)
Mean daily maximum °F (°C)	35.8 (2.1)	38.6 (3.7)	49.7 (9.8)	58.8 (14.9)	69.0 (20.6)	79.6 (26.4)	85.3 (29.6)	83.5 (28.6)	76.5 (24.7)	63.2 (17.3)	48.9 (9.4)	37.7 (3.2)	60.6 (15.9)
Daily mean °F (°C)	23.8 (−4.6)	26.5 (−3.1)	36.3 (2.4)	45.5 (7.5)	56.2 (13.4)	67.0 (19.4)	72.5 (22.5)	70.5 (21.4)	62.1 (16.7)	48.6 (9.2)	35.7 (2.1)	25.8 (−3.4)	47.5 (8.6)
Mean daily minimum °F (°C)	11.7 (−11.3)	14.3 (−9.8)	22.8 (−5.1)	32.1 (0.1)	43.3 (6.3)	54.4 (12.4)	59.7 (15.4)	57.4 (14.1)	47.6 (8.7)	34.1 (1.2)	22.4 (−5.3)	13.9 (−10.1)	34.5 (1.4)
Mean minimum °F (°C)	−10.5 (−23.6)	−6.7 (−21.5)	3.4 (−15.9)	16.8 (−8.4)	29.0 (−1.7)	41.9 (5.5)	48.5 (9.2)	45.7 (7.6)	32.1 (0.1)	17.2 (−8.2)	4.2 (−15.4)	−5.8 (−21.0)	−16.4 (−26.9)
Record low °F (°C)	−37 (−38)	−29 (−34)	−24 (−31)	5 (−15)	18 (−8)	30 (−1)	35 (2)	34 (1)	16 (−9)	5 (−15)	−19 (−28)	−35 (−37)	−37 (−38)
Average precipitation inches (mm)	0.51 (13)	0.68 (17)	1.34 (34)	2.78 (71)	3.74 (95)	3.74 (95)	3.30 (84)	3.10 (79)	2.12 (54)	2.20 (56)	0.88 (22)	0.68 (17)	25.07 (637)
Average snowfall inches (cm)	6.4 (16)	7.1 (18)	5.3 (13)	3.7 (9.4)	0.2 (0.51)	0.0 (0.0)	0.0 (0.0)	0.0 (0.0)	0.0 (0.0)	2.4 (6.1)	3.6 (9.1)	5.3 (13)	34.0 (86)
Average precipitation days (≥ 0.01 in)	3.7	4.4	5.7	8.2	10.6	10.0	8.2	7.5	5.7	5.8	3.6	3.4	76.8
Average snowy days (≥ 0.1 in)	3.3	3.8	2.8	1.7	0.1	0.0	0.0	0.0	0.0	0.8	2.0	2.9	17.4
Source: NOAA

== Notable people ==
- Jay Wright Forrester - computer engineer, management theorist and systems scientist
- Sandra Kauffman - politician

== See also ==
- List of municipalities in Nebraska
