= Finchville, Nebraska =

Unincorporated community in Nebraska, United States

- Unincorporated Community
- Location within Nebraska Location within the United States
- Coordinates: 41.4°N 100.1°W
- Country: United States
- State: Nebraska
- County: Custer

Finchville is an unincorporated community in Custer County, Nebraska, United States.

== History ==
A post office was established at Finchville in 1914, and remained in operation until it was discontinued in 1935.
