= Etna, Nebraska =

Unincorporated community in Nebraska, United States

- Unincorporated Community
- Location within Nebraska Location within the United States
- Coordinates: 41.1406°N 100.157°W
- Country: United States
- State: Nebraska
- County: Custer
- Elevation: 2,802 ft (854 m)

Etna (formerly Etha) is an unincorporated community in Custer County, Nebraska, United States. It lies at an elevation of 2,802 feet (854 m).

A post office was established at Etna in 1885, and remained in operation until it was discontinued in 1921. Etna no longer exists, a simple roadside marker indicates the location of the former town. The school survived until 1966, but most other establishments (general store, post office, etc.) closed in 1931. There is a mailbox next to the marker with a book of historical information about Etna and a guest book to sign.
