= Callaway, Nebraska =

- Village
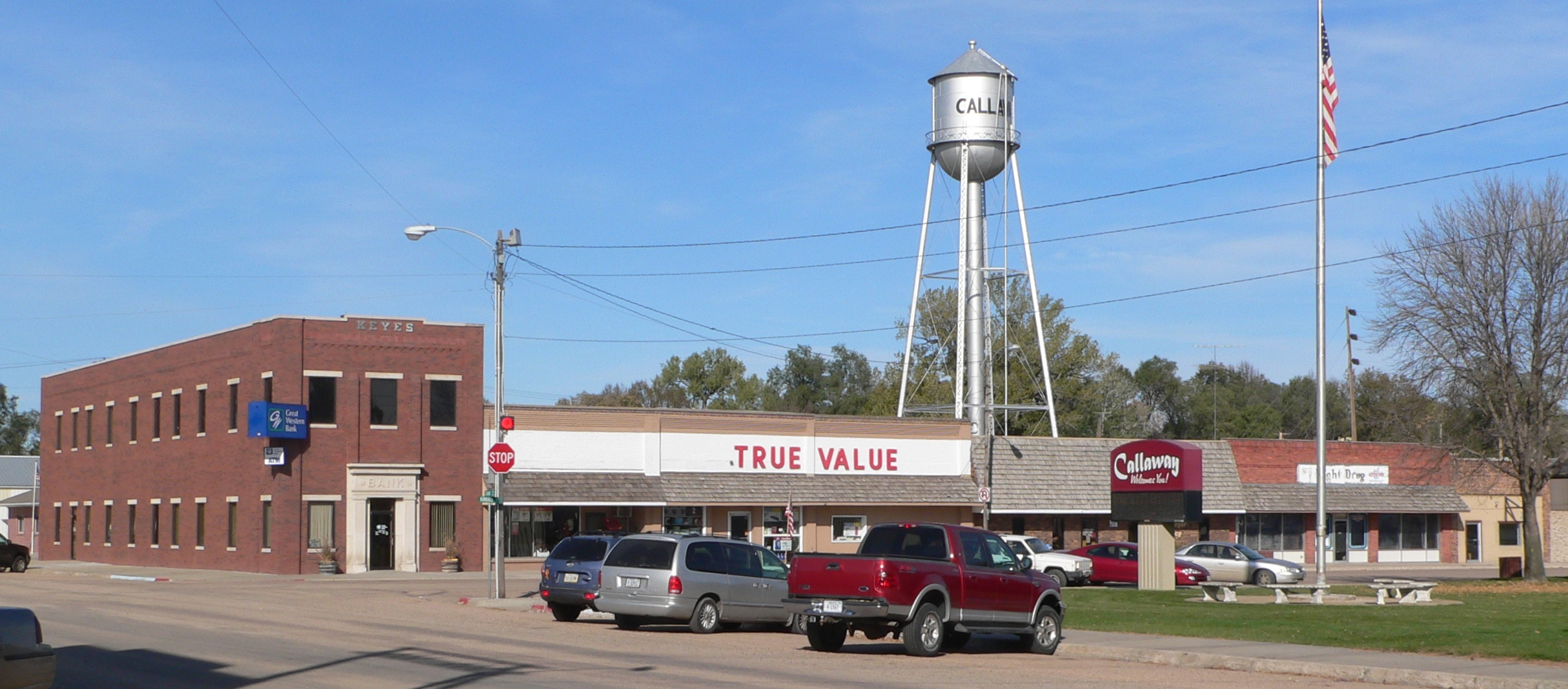
- Downtown Callaway

- Location of Callaway, Nebraska

- Location within Nebraska Location within the United States
- Coordinates: 41°17′29″N 99°55′13″W
- Country: United States
- State: Nebraska
- County: Custer
- Township: Delight

Area
  - Total: 0.70 sq mi (1.81 km^{2})
  - Land: 0.70 sq mi (1.81 km^{2})
  - Water: 0 sq mi (0.00 km^{2})
- Elevation: 2,549 ft (777 m)

Population (2020)
  - Total: 563
  - Density: 807/sq mi (311.6/km^{2})
- Time zone: UTC-6 (Central (CST))
  - Summer (DST): UTC-5 (CDT)
- ZIP code: 68825
- Area code: 308
- FIPS code: 31-07660
- GNIS feature ID: 2397532
- Website: villageofcallawayne.gov

Callaway is a village in Custer County, Nebraska, United States. As of the 2020 census, Callaway had a population of 563.

== History ==
Callaway was platted in 1885. It was named for S. R. Callaway, general manager of the Union Pacific Railroad.

== Geography ==
According to the United States Census Bureau, the village has a total area of 0.70 square miles (1.81 km^{2}), all land.

== Demographics ==
Historical population
Census	Pop.	Note	%±
1890	234		—
1900	406		73.5%
1910	765		88.4%
1920	833		8.9%
1930	833		0.0%
1940	768		−7.8%
1950	744		−3.1%
1960	603		−19.0%
1970	523		−13.3%
1980	579		10.7%
1990	539		−6.9%
2000	637		18.2%
2010	539		−15.4%
2020	563		4.5%
U.S. Decennial Census

=== 2010 census ===
As of the census of 2010, there were 539 people, 247 households, and 153 families living in the village. The population density was 770.0 inhabitants per square mile (297.3/km^{2}). There were 295 housing units at an average density of 421.4 per square mile (162.7/km^{2}). The racial makeup of the village was 98.3% White, 0.2% Native American, 0.4% Asian, and 1.1% from two or more races. Hispanic or Latino of any race were 1.5% of the population.

There were 247 households, of which 23.9% had children under the age of 18 living with them, 55.5% were married couples living together, 4.0% had a female householder with no husband present, 2.4% had a male householder with no wife present, and 38.1% were non-families. 33.6% of all households were made up of individuals, and 22.3% had someone living alone who was 65 years of age or older. The average household size was 2.18 and the average family size was 2.74.

The median age in the village was 47.8 years. 22.1% of residents were under the age of 18; 4% were between the ages of 18 and 24; 18.8% were from 25 to 44; 27% were from 45 to 64; and 28.2% were 65 years of age or older. The gender makeup of the village was 45.5% male and 54.5% female.

=== 2000 census ===
As of the census of 2000, there were 637 people, 262 households, and 166 families living in the village. The population density was 916.8 inhabitants per square mile (354.0/km^{2}). There were 291 housing units at an average density of 418.8 per square mile (161.7/km^{2}). The racial makeup of the village was 97.49% White, 0.31% Native American, 0.31% Asian, 0.78% from other races, and 1.10% from two or more races. Hispanic or Latino of any race were 1.41% of the population.

There were 262 households, out of which 25.2% had children under the age of 18 living with them, 57.6% were married couples living together, 5.7% had a female householder with no husband present, and 36.3% were non-families. 32.4% of all households were made up of individuals, and 23.3% had someone living alone who was 65 years of age or older. The average household size was 2.27 and the average family size was 2.87.

In the village, the population was spread out, with 22.8% under the age of 18, 4.9% from 18 to 24, 17.4% from 25 to 44, 24.5% from 45 to 64, and 30.5% who were 65 years of age or older. The median age was 48 years. For every 100 females, there were 76.9 males. For every 100 females age 18 and over, there were 80.2 males.

As of 2000 the median income for a household in the village was $27,656, and the median income for a family was $37,000. Males had a median income of $24,188 versus $16,591 for females. The per capita income for the village was $14,673. About 7.2% of families and 14.6% of the population were below the poverty line, including 24.0% of those under age 18 and 12.0% of those age 65 or over.
