= Custer County, Nebraska =

County in Nebraska, United States

- County
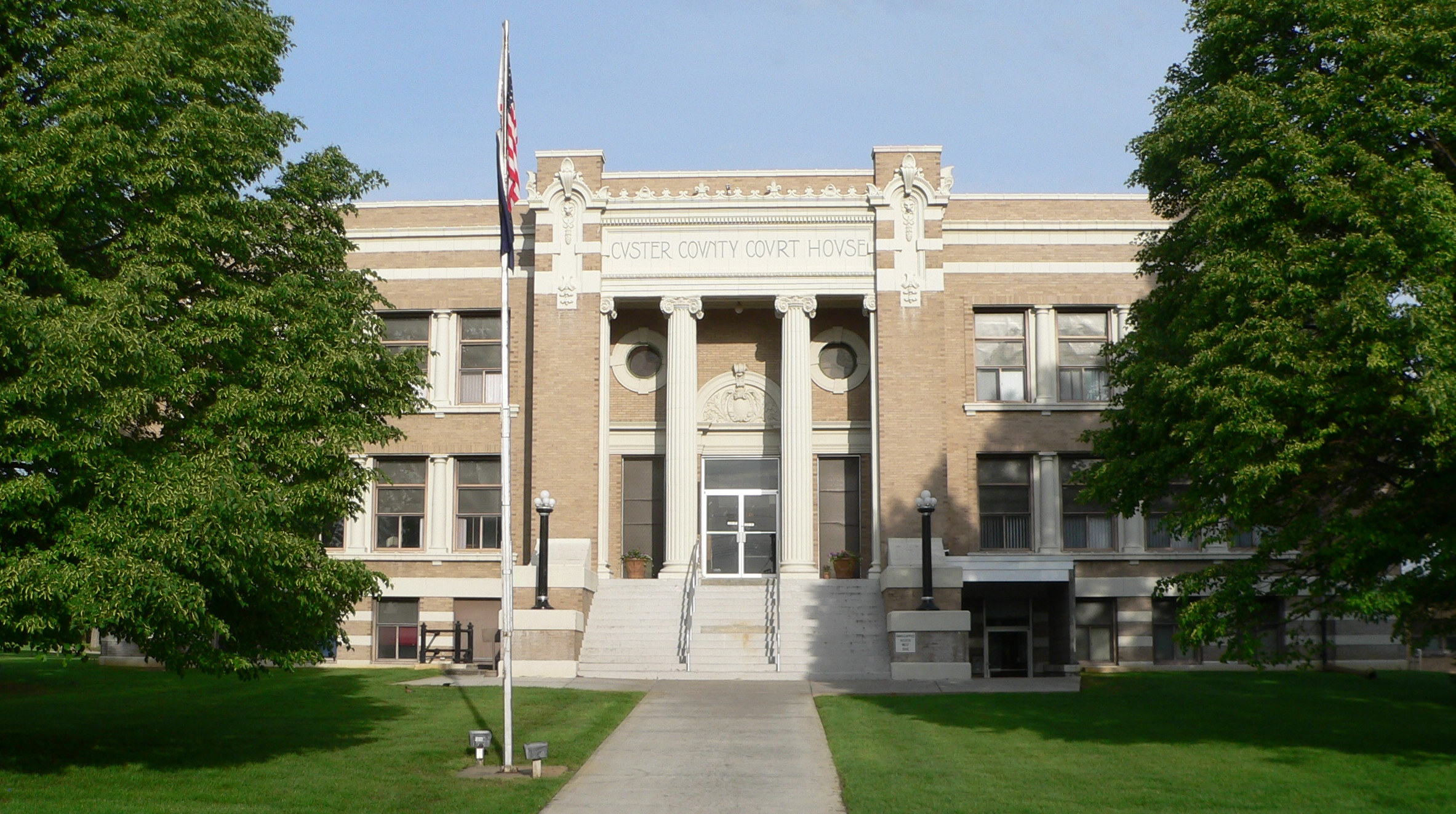
- Custer County Courthouse in Broken Bow

- Location within the U.S. state of Nebraska
- Coordinates: 41°23′N 99°44′W
- Country: United States
- State: Nebraska
- Founded: February 17, 1877
- Named for: George Armstrong Custer
- Seat: Broken Bow
- Largest city: Broken Bow

Area
  - Total: 2,576 sq mi (6,670 km^{2})
  - Land: 2,576 sq mi (6,670 km^{2})
  - Water: 0.4 sq mi (1.0 km^{2}) 0.01%

Population (2020)
  - Total: 10,545
  - Estimate (2025): 10,500 ▼
  - Density: 4.06/sq mi (1.57/km^{2})
- Time zone: UTC−6 (Central)
  - Summer (DST): UTC−5 (CDT)
- Congressional district: 3rd
- Website: custercountyne.gov

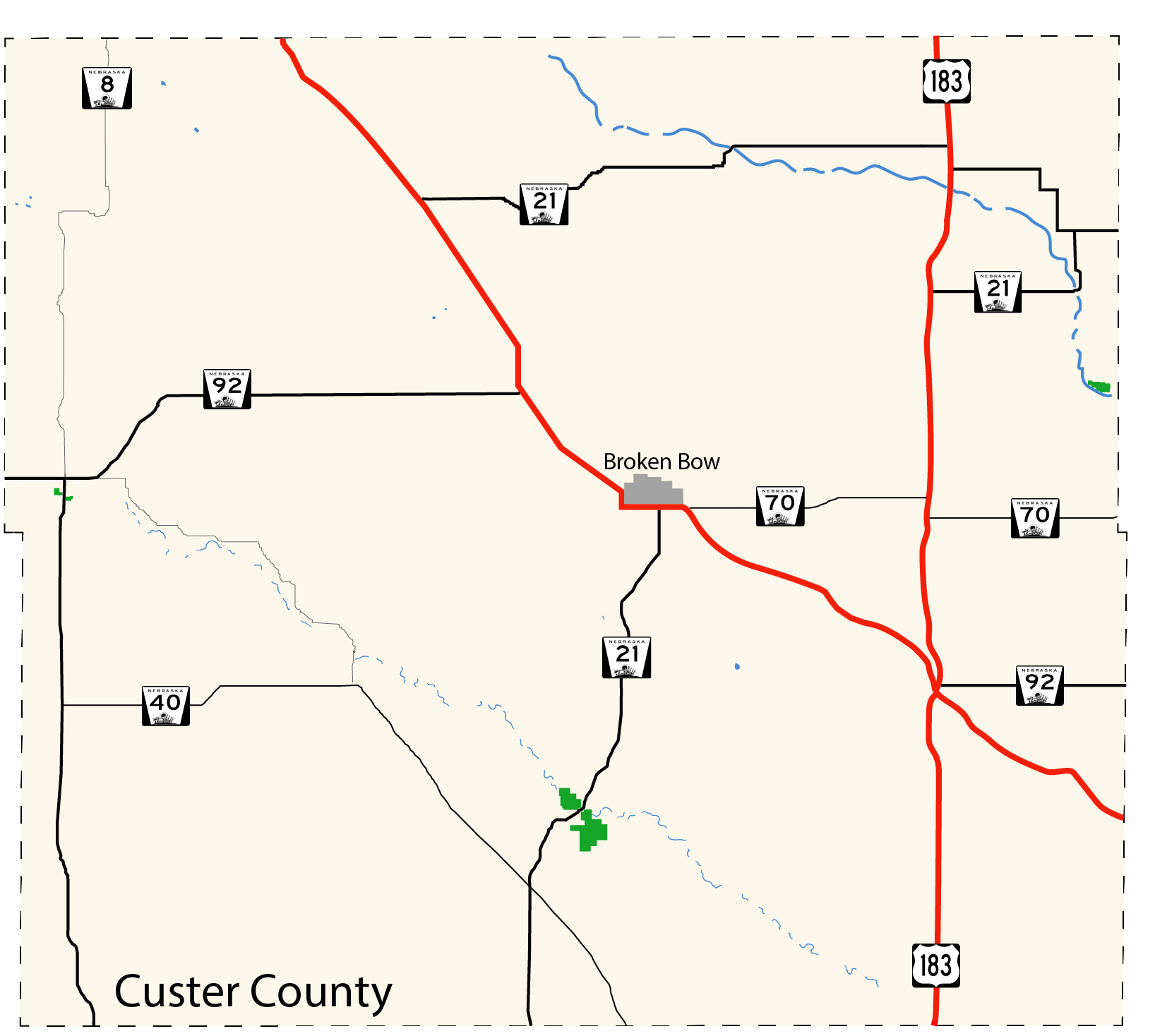
Custer County

Custer County is a county in the U.S. state of Nebraska. As of the 2020 United States census, the population was 10,545. Its county seat is Broken Bow. The county was formed in 1877 and named after General George Armstrong Custer, who was killed at the Battle of Little Bighorn.

In the Nebraska license plate system, Custer County is represented by the prefix 4 (it had the fourth-largest number of vehicles registered in the state when the license plate system was established in 1922).

== Geography ==
According to the US Census Bureau, the county has a total area of 2,576 square miles (6,670 km^{2}), of which 2,576 square miles (6,670 km^{2}) is land and 0.4 square miles (1.0 km^{2}) (0.01%) is water. In area, it is the second largest county in Nebraska, behind only Cherry County, slightly more than twice its size.

=== Major highways ===
- U.S. Highway 183
- Nebraska Highway 2
- Nebraska Highway 21
- Nebraska Highway 40
- Nebraska Highway 47
- Nebraska Highway 70
- Nebraska Highway 92

=== Adjacent counties ===
- Valley County – northeast
- Sherman County – southeast
- Buffalo County – southeast
- Dawson County – south
- Lincoln County – southwest
- Logan County – west
- Blaine County – northwest
- Loup County – northeast

== History ==
Custer County, named in honor of General George Armstrong Custer, was officially organized in 1877, although its settlement commenced earlier. The region was once part of the Sioux territory, but following the Indian Wars, particularly after the Battle of the Little Bighorn, the land was opened for homesteading. The first settlers arrived in the early 1870s, inspired by the promise of land through the Homestead Act of 1862. These early pioneers encountered formidable challenges like extreme weather conditions, isolation, and the task of farming in what was considered the Great American Desert. They constructed sod houses due to the absence of timber, and settlements were strategically placed near water sources.

The Burlington Railroad's extension through the county in the early 1880s significantly boosted settlement by providing a means for transportation and trade. This led to the establishment of towns like Broken Bow, which was designated as the county seat. The railroad not only facilitated the influx of settlers but also allowed for the export of agricultural products, marking the transition from cattle ranching to more diverse farming practices.

Agriculture shifted from cattle ranching to diversified farming, with wheat and corn becoming prominent crops. By the dawn of the 20th century, the community had established schools, churches, and other civic institutions, marking the transition from a frontier settlement to a more organized community.

== Demographics ==
Historical population
| Census | Pop. | Note | %± |
|---|---|---|---|
| 1880 | 2,211 | | — |
| 1890 | 21,677 | | 880.4% |
| 1900 | 19,758 | | −8.9% |
| 1910 | 25,668 | | 29.9% |
| 1920 | 26,407 | | 2.9% |
| 1930 | 26,189 | | −0.8% |
| 1940 | 22,591 | | −13.7% |
| 1950 | 19,170 | | −15.1% |
| 1960 | 16,517 | | −13.8% |
| 1970 | 14,092 | | −14.7% |
| 1980 | 13,877 | | −1.5% |
| 1990 | 12,270 | | −11.6% |
| 2000 | 11,793 | | −3.9% |
| 2010 | 10,939 | | −7.2% |
| 2020 | 10,545 | | −3.6% |
| 2025 (est.) | 10,500 | ▼ | −0.4% |
US Decennial Census; 1790-1960 1900-1990; 1990-2000 2010-2013

=== 2020 census ===
As of the 2020 census, the county had a population of 10,545. The median age was 43.5 years. 23.6% of residents were under the age of 18 and 23.2% of residents were 65 years of age or older. For every 100 females there were 99.2 males, and for every 100 females age 18 and over there were 97.6 males age 18 and over.

The racial makeup of the county was 94.1% White, 0.5% Black or African American, 0.4% American Indian and Alaska Native, 0.2% Asian, 0.0% Native Hawaiian and Pacific Islander, 1.4% from some other race, and 3.5% from two or more races. Hispanic or Latino residents of any race comprised 3.7% of the population.

0.0% of residents lived in urban areas, while 100.0% lived in rural areas.

There were 4,551 households in the county, of which 26.4% had children under the age of 18 living with them and 22.8% had a female householder with no spouse or partner present. About 32.4% of all households were made up of individuals and 16.7% had someone living alone who was 65 years of age or older.

There were 5,310 housing units, of which 14.3% were vacant. Among occupied housing units, 72.7% were owner-occupied and 27.3% were renter-occupied. The homeowner vacancy rate was 1.9% and the rental vacancy rate was 9.4%.

=== 2000 census ===
As of the 2000 United States census, there were 11,793 people, 4,826 households, and 3,320 families in the county. The population density was 5 people per square mile (1.9 people/km^{2}). There were 5,585 housing units at an average density of 2 units per square mile (0.77/km^{2}). The racial makeup of the county was 98.63% White, 0.07% Black or African American, 0.41% Native American, 0.15% Asian, 0.20% from other races, and 0.55% from two or more races. 0.92% of the population were Hispanic or Latino of any race. 37.3% were of German, 11.9% English, 10.6% Irish and 8.9% American ancestry.

There were 4,826 households, out of which 30.30% had children under the age of 18 living with them, 60.90% were married couples living together, 5.40% had a female householder with no husband present, and 31.20% were non-families. 28.90% of all households were made up of individuals, and 15.00% had someone living alone who was 65 years of age or older. The average household size was 2.39 and the average family size was 2.95.

The county population contained 26.30% under the age of 18, 5.50% from 18 to 24, 23.50% from 25 to 44, 23.70% from 45 to 64, and 21.10% who were 65 years of age or older. The median age was 41 years. For every 100 females there were 96.10 males. For every 100 females age 18 and over, there were 91.70 males.

The median income for a household in the county was $30,677, and the median income for a family was $37,063. Males had a median income of $24,609 versus $19,732 for females. The per capita income for the county was $16,171. About 9.10% of families and 12.40% of the population were below the poverty line, including 16.20% of those under age 18 and 9.10% of those age 65 or over.

== Communities ==
=== Cities ===
- Broken Bow (county seat)
- Sargent

=== Villages ===
- Anselmo
- Ansley
- Arnold
- Berwyn
- Callaway
- Comstock
- Mason City
- Merna
- Oconto

=== Census-designated place ===
- Westerville

=== Unincorporated communities ===
- Cumro
- Etna
- Finchville
- Gates
- Lillian
- Lodi
- Milburn
- New Helena
- Round Valley
- Walworth
- Weissert
- Wescott

=== Townships ===
- Algernon
- Ansley
- Arnold
- Berwyn
- Broken Bow
- Cliff
- Comstock
- Corner
- Custer
- Delight
- Douglas Grove
- East Custer
- Elim
- Elk Creek
- Garfield
- Grant
- Hayes
- Kilfoil
- Lillian
- Loup
- Milburn
- Myrtle
- Ryno
- Sargent
- Spring Creek
- Triumph
- Victoria
- Wayne
- Westerville
- West Union
- Wood River

== Politics ==
Custer County voters are reliably Republican. In no national election since 1936 has the county selected the Democratic Party candidate.

United States presidential election results for Custer County, Nebraska
| Year | Republican | | Democratic | | Third party(ies) | |
| Year | No. | % | No. | % | No. | % |
|---|---|---|---|---|---|---|
| 1900 | 2,145 | 47.24% | 2,159 | 47.54% | 237 | 5.22% |
| 1904 | 2,658 | 59.61% | 509 | 11.42% | 1,292 | 28.98% |
| 1908 | 2,788 | 47.01% | 2,898 | 48.86% | 245 | 4.13% |
| 1912 | 1,051 | 18.20% | 2,395 | 41.46% | 2,330 | 40.34% |
| 1916 | 2,047 | 34.24% | 3,609 | 60.37% | 322 | 5.39% |
| 1920 | 4,974 | 59.31% | 2,739 | 32.66% | 674 | 8.04% |
| 1924 | 3,833 | 39.95% | 2,575 | 26.84% | 3,187 | 33.22% |
| 1928 | 8,379 | 76.40% | 2,506 | 22.85% | 82 | 0.75% |
| 1932 | 3,953 | 35.66% | 6,844 | 61.74% | 289 | 2.61% |
| 1936 | 5,250 | 45.67% | 5,907 | 51.39% | 338 | 2.94% |
| 1940 | 6,269 | 59.66% | 4,238 | 40.34% | 0 | 0.00% |
| 1944 | 5,330 | 61.61% | 3,321 | 38.39% | 0 | 0.00% |
| 1948 | 4,057 | 54.73% | 3,356 | 45.27% | 0 | 0.00% |
| 1952 | 7,143 | 77.17% | 2,113 | 22.83% | 0 | 0.00% |
| 1956 | 5,798 | 70.51% | 2,425 | 29.49% | 0 | 0.00% |
| 1960 | 5,716 | 70.87% | 2,350 | 29.13% | 0 | 0.00% |
| 1964 | 3,916 | 52.98% | 3,475 | 47.02% | 0 | 0.00% |
| 1968 | 4,325 | 70.52% | 1,407 | 22.94% | 401 | 6.54% |
| 1972 | 4,836 | 80.83% | 1,147 | 19.17% | 0 | 0.00% |
| 1976 | 3,935 | 63.72% | 1,985 | 32.15% | 255 | 4.13% |
| 1980 | 4,563 | 76.90% | 1,011 | 17.04% | 360 | 6.07% |
| 1984 | 4,749 | 80.94% | 1,090 | 18.58% | 28 | 0.48% |
| 1988 | 4,203 | 73.40% | 1,496 | 26.13% | 27 | 0.47% |
| 1992 | 3,180 | 54.64% | 1,126 | 19.35% | 1,514 | 26.01% |
| 1996 | 3,453 | 64.15% | 1,293 | 24.02% | 637 | 11.83% |
| 2000 | 4,245 | 78.41% | 976 | 18.03% | 193 | 3.56% |
| 2004 | 4,518 | 80.51% | 1,040 | 18.53% | 54 | 0.96% |
| 2008 | 4,301 | 77.11% | 1,192 | 21.37% | 85 | 1.52% |
| 2012 | 4,296 | 78.14% | 1,083 | 19.70% | 119 | 2.16% |
| 2016 | 4,695 | 83.07% | 641 | 11.34% | 316 | 5.59% |
| 2020 | 5,090 | 84.69% | 786 | 13.08% | 134 | 2.23% |
| 2024 | 5,042 | 85.33% | 786 | 13.30% | 81 | 1.37% |

== See also ==
- National Register of Historic Places listings in Custer County, Nebraska
