= Triumph Township, Custer County, Nebraska =

Triumph Township
- Township
- Location in Custer County
- Coordinates: 41°22′10″N 099°59′51″W
- Country: United States
- State: Nebraska
- County: Custer

Area
  - Total: 70.29 sq mi (182.05 km^{2})
  - Land: 70.27 sq mi (182.01 km^{2})
  - Water: 0.015 sq mi (0.04 km^{2}) 0.02%
- Elevation: 2,815 ft (858 m)

Population (2020)
  - Total: 108
  - Density: 1.54/sq mi (0.593/km^{2})
- GNIS feature ID: 0838292

Triumph Township is one of thirty-one townships in Custer County, Nebraska, United States. The population was 108 at the 2020 census. A 2021 estimate placed the township's population at 107.

== See also ==
- County government in Nebraska
