= Custer Township, Morton County, North Dakota =

Coordinates: 46°54′02″N 102°02′44″W

Custer Township is the name shared by former townships in Morton County, North Dakota, United States. Both townships were organized at different times in two different parts of the county.

== History ==
The first Custer township was established around 1900 in the eastern part of the county, south of Mandan in survey township T138 North, R80 West. It recorded a population of 116 in the 1900 Census, before the civil township dissolved in 1906. This area recorded a population of 26 in 1920.

The second Custer township was organized after the 1910 Census in the northwest corner of Morton County, around the city of Hebron. It occupied two survey townships between T139 and T 140 North, R90 W. The population was 395 in 1930, and the civil organization for the township was dissolved in 1948.
