= Custer Township, Custer County, Nebraska =

Custer Township
- Township
- Location in Custer County
- Coordinates: 41°16′18″N 099°48′17″W
- Country: United States
- State: Nebraska
- County: Custer

Area
  - Total: 53.75 sq mi (139.22 km^{2})
  - Land: 53.75 sq mi (139.22 km^{2})
  - Water: 0 sq mi (0 km^{2}) 0%
- Elevation: 2,477 ft (755 m)

Population (2020)
  - Total: 91
  - Density: 1.7/sq mi (0.65/km^{2})
- GNIS feature ID: 0837954

Custer Township is one of thirty-one townships in Custer County, Nebraska, United States. The population was 91 at the 2020 census. A 2021 estimate placed the township's population at 92.
