= National Register of Historic Places listings in Custer County, Nebraska =

Location of Custer County in Nebraska

Custer County, Nebraska, United States, has 14 properties and districts listed on the National Register of Historic Places. Another three sites were once listed but have since been removed.

The locations of National Register properties and districts for which the latitude and longitude coordinates are included below may be seen in a map.

This National Park Service list is complete through NPS recent listings posted October 30, 2026.

== Listings county-wide ==
	Name on the Register	Image	Date listed	Location	City or town	Description
1	Arrow Hotel	Arrow Hotel	September 12, 1985 (#85002145)	509 S. 9th Ave. 41°24′06″N 99°38′26″W	Broken Bow	
2	Brenizer Library	Brenizer Library	July 3, 2007 (#07000654)	430 W. Center Ave. 41°29′04″N 99°45′41″W	Merna	
3	Broken Bow Carnegie Library	Broken Bow Carnegie Library	March 5, 1998 (#98000193)	255 S. 10th St. 41°24′12″N 99°38′30″W	Broken Bow	
4	Broken Bow Commercial Square Historic District	Broken Bow Commercial Square Historic District	November 21, 2006 (#06001058)	Five blocks in downtown Broken Bow centered around the public square 41°24′08″N 99°38′25″W	Broken Bow	
5	Custer County Courthouse and Jail	Custer County Courthouse and Jail	April 19, 1979 (#79001435)	Courthouse Square, Main St. 41°24′09″N 99°38′32″W	Broken Bow	
6	William R. Dowse House	William R. Dowse House	December 1, 1986 (#86003365)	80560 Oak Grove Road; 41°30′40″N 99°15′40″W	Comstock	
7	Finch Memorial Library	Finch Memorial Library	July 1, 2015 (#15000392)	205 N. Walnut St. 41°25′26″N 100°11′40″W	Arnold	
8	First Custer County Courthouse	First Custer County Courthouse	January 10, 1990 (#89002213)	Pacific St. and Cameron Ave. 41°17′33″N 99°55′22″W	Callaway	
9	First National Bank-Steinmeier Building	First National Bank-Steinmeier Building	August 10, 2011 (#11000527)	624 Main St. 41°17′17″N 99°22′53″W	Ansley	
10	Stillman P. Groat House	Stillman P. Groat House	March 24, 2015 (#15000105)	432 N. 10th Ave. 41°24′32″N 99°38′29″W	Broken Bow	
11	Benjamin and Mary Kellenbarger House	Benjamin and Mary Kellenbarger House	July 3, 2007 (#07000659)	451 W. Center Ave. 41°29′02″N 99°45′51″W	Merna	
12	Mason City School	Mason City School	March 2, 2006 (#06000103)	750 Main St. 41°13′14″N 99°18′02″W	Mason City	
13	St. Anselm's Catholic Church, Rectory and Parish Hall	St. Anselm's Catholic Church, Rectory and Parish Hall	March 12, 2008 (#08000170)	Nebraska Highway 2; 41°36′58″N 99°51′59″W	Anselmo	
14	Security State Bank Building	Security State Bank Building	November 30, 1987 (#87002072)	403 S. 9th St. 41°24′09″N 99°38′26″W	Broken Bow	

== Former listings ==
	Name on the Register	Image	Date listed	Date removed	Location	City or town	Description
1	Haumont House		October 15, 1969 (#69000368)	January 4, 1973	NE of Broken Bow	Broken Bow vicinity	Two story sod house built in 1883. Demolished in March, 1972
2	Sargent Bridge	Sargent Bridge	June 29, 1992 (#92000740)	March 13, 2020	Dawson St. over the Middle Loup River, 1 mile south of Sargent; 41°37′38″N 99°22′18″W	Sargent	Destroyed by flooding in 2019
3	Wescott, Gibbons & Bragg Store		January 31, 1978 (#78001694)	March 14, 2007	Off Nebraska Highway 106	Comstock	Destroyed by fire in 2007.

== See also ==
- List of National Historic Landmarks in Nebraska
- National Register of Historic Places listings in Nebraska
