= Brenizer =

Brenizer may refer to:

- Brenizer, Pennsylvania
- Brenizer Library
- Brenizer Method
