= Brenneis =

Brenneis is a German language occupational surname for a blacksmith and may refer to:

- Don Brenneis (born 1946), American anthropologist
- Gerd Brenneis (1930–2003), German operatic tenor
- Jo Brenneis (1910–1994), German painter
- Otto Brenneis (1900–1945), German SS-Hauptsturmführer

== See also ==
- Brenizer, Pennsylvania
- Brenizer Method
