= Custer County Courthouse =

Custer County Courthouse may refer to:

- Custer County Courthouse (Colorado), Westcliffe, Colorado, (1929) designed by John J. Huddart
- Custer County Courthouse (Broken Bow, Nebraska), listed on the National Register of Historic Places (NRHP)
- Custer County Courthouse (Callaway, Nebraska), NRHP-listed, also known as "First Custer County Courthouse"
- Custer County Courthouse (South Dakota), Custer, South Dakota, NRHP-listed
