= Brenizer Library =

- U.S. National Register of Historic Places
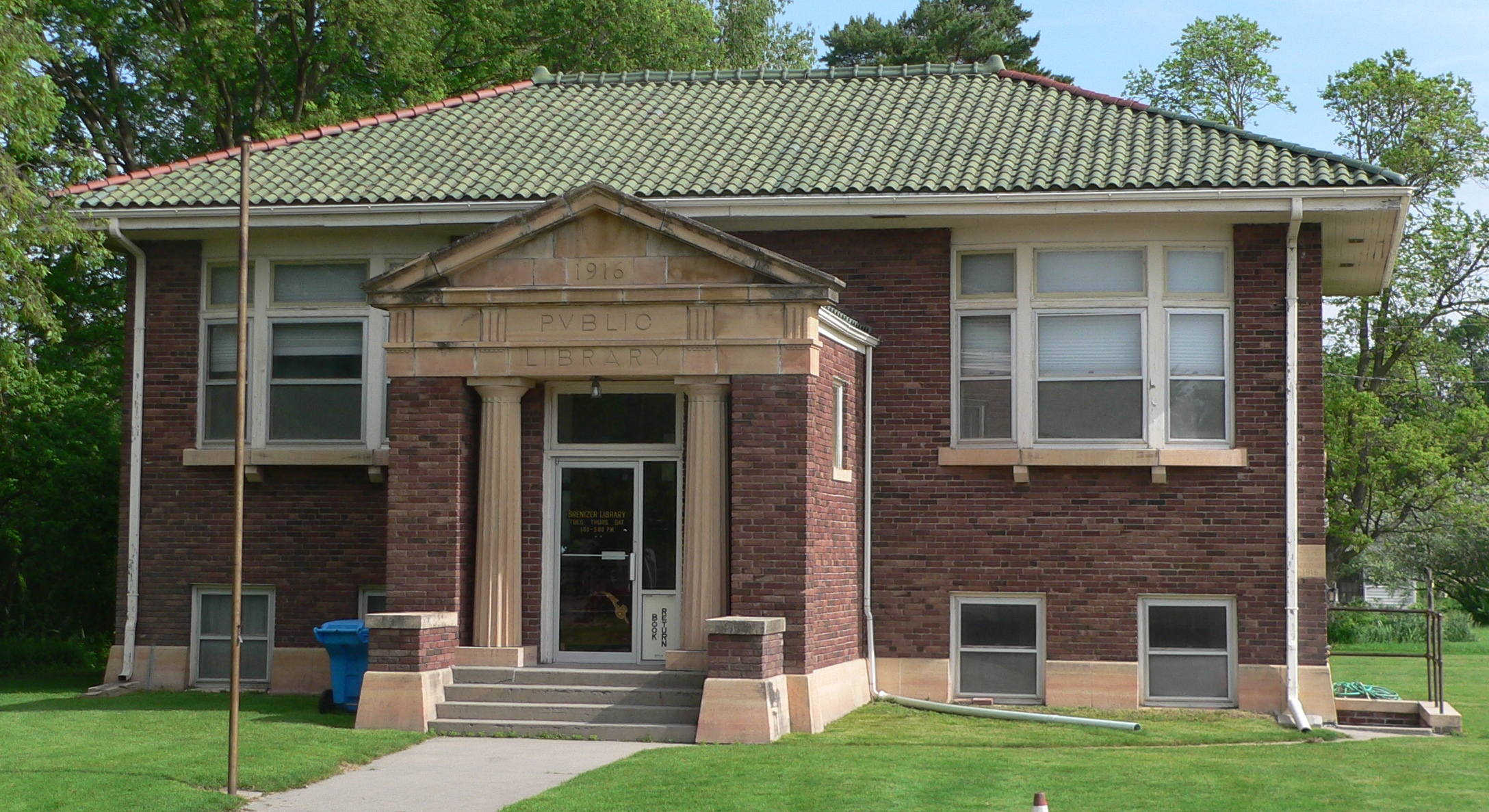
- The library in 2010

- Location within Nebraska Location within the United States
- Location: 430 West Center Avenue, Merna, Nebraska
- Coordinates: 41°29′04″N 99°45′41″W
- Area: less than one acre
- Built: 1917
- Built by: C.H. Empfield & Bert Elder
- Architect: Claude W. Way
- Architectural style: Prairie School, Classical Revival
- NRHP reference No.: 07000654
- Added to NRHP: July 3, 2007

The Brenizer Library is a historic building in Merna, Nebraska. It was built in 1916-1917 by C.H. Empfield & Bert Elder thanks to a $6,500 donation from homesteader James G. Brenizer, and designed in the Prairie School and Classical Revival styles by architect Claude W. Way. It has been listed on the National Register of Historic Places since July 3, 2007.
