= Broken Bow Carnegie Library =

- U.S. National Register of Historic Places
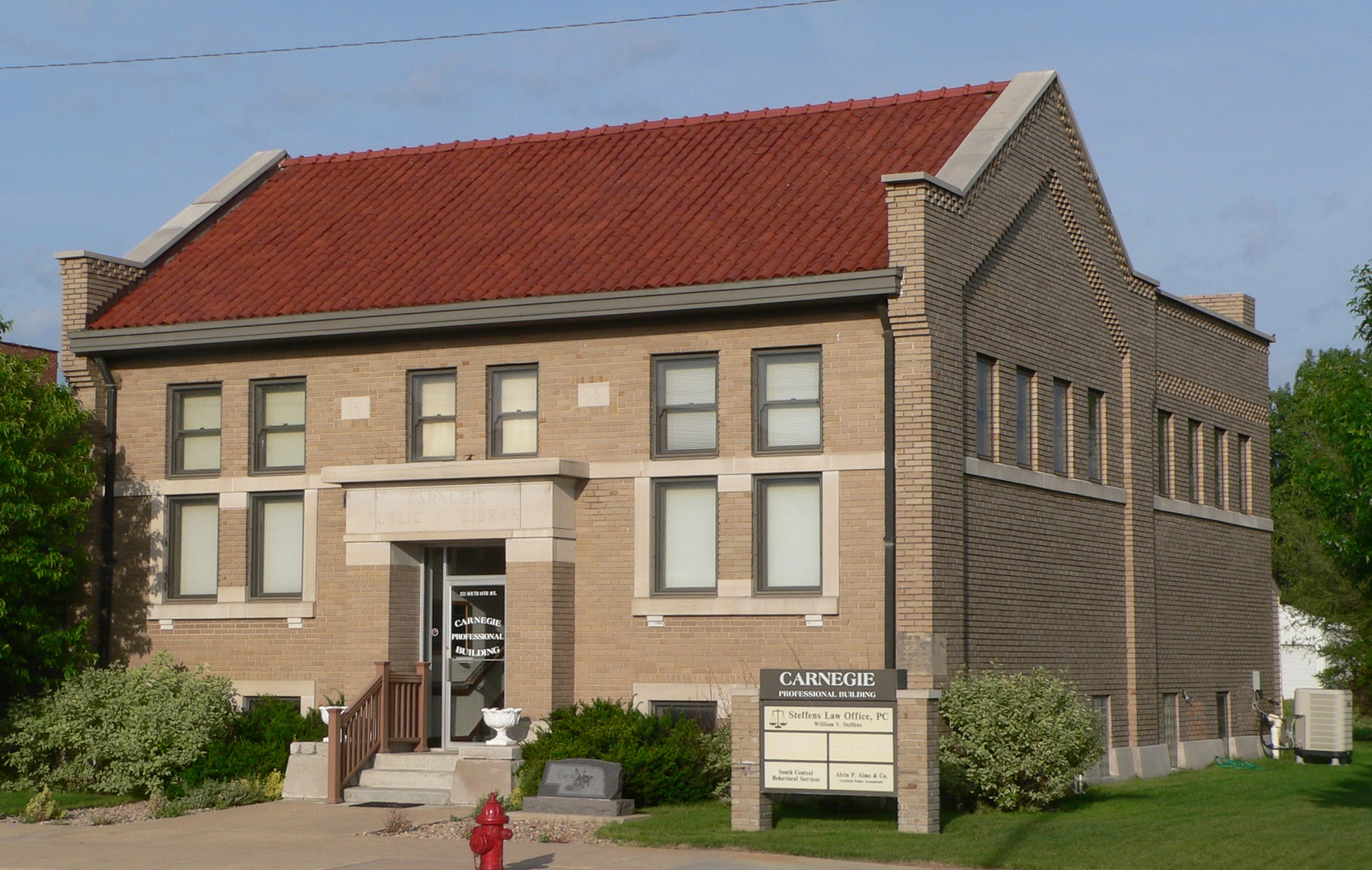
- The library in 2010

- Location within Nebraska Location within the United States
- Location: 255 South 10th Street, Broken Bow, Nebraska
- Coordinates: 41°24′12″N 99°38′30″W
- Area: less than one acre
- Built: 1916
- Built by: Clyde Elder
- Architect: M.N. Bair
- MPS: Carnegie Libraries in Nebraska MPS
- NRHP reference No.: 98000193
- Added to NRHP: March 5, 1998

The Broken Bow Carnegie Library is a historic building in Broken Bow, Nebraska. It was built by Clyde Elder in 1915-1916 as a Carnegie library thanks to a $10,000 donation from the Carnegie Corporation of New York, and designed by M.N. Bair. It was dedicated on March 25, 1916, and it remained the public library in Broken Bow until 1972. It has been listed on the National Register of Historic Places since March 5, 1998.
