= Arrow Hotel =

- U.S. National Register of Historic Places
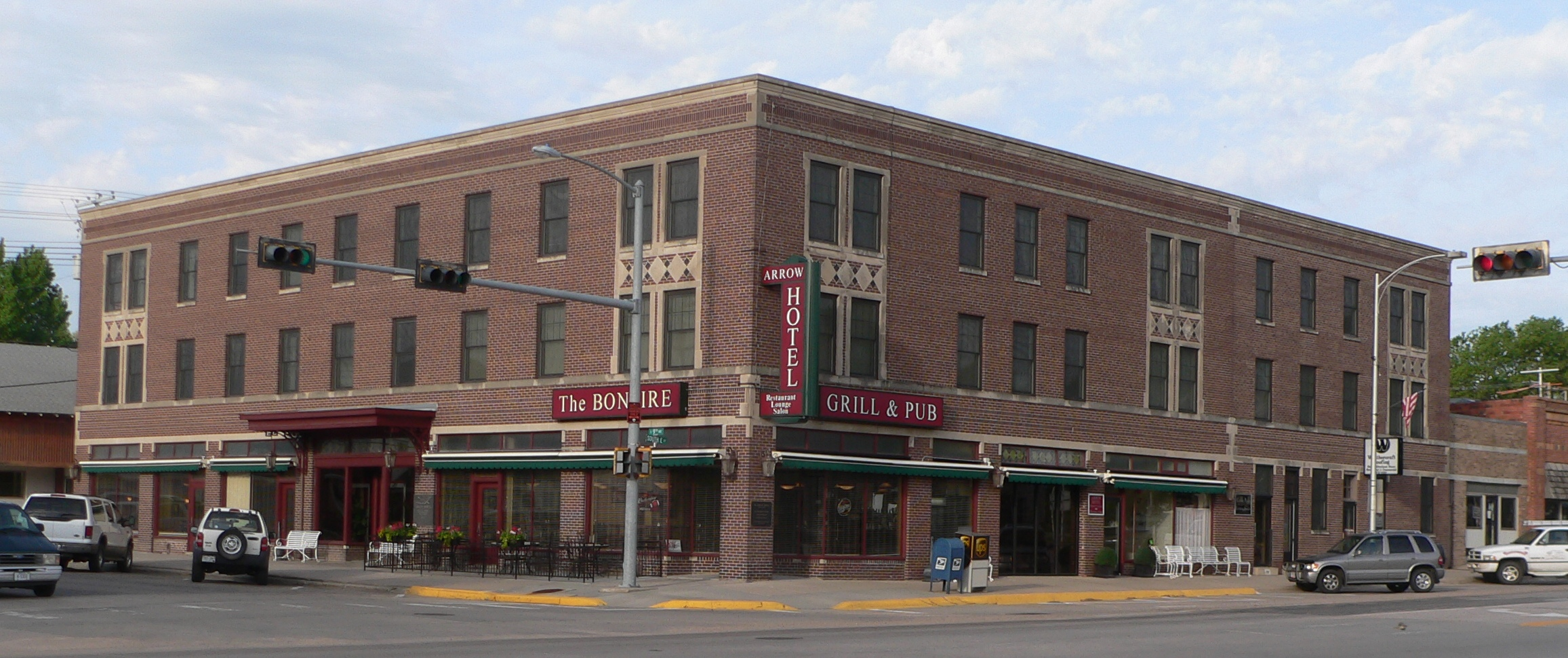
- The hotel in 2010

- Location within Nebraska Location within the United States
- Location: 509 South 9th Avenue, Broken Bow, Nebraska
- Coordinates: 41°24′06″N 99°38′26″W
- Area: less than one acre
- Built: 1928
- Built by: C. E. Atwater
- Architect: John Latenser & Sons
- Architectural style: Prairie School
- NRHP reference No.: 85002145
- Added to NRHP: September 12, 1985

The Arrow Hotel is a historic hotel building in Broken Bow, Nebraska. It was built on the site of the demolished 1883 Commercial Hotel by C.E. Atwater in 1928, and designed in the Prairie School style by John Latenser & Sons. Inside, there are four murals by Tom Talbot, who maintained a studio in the hotel in the 1960s. The building has been listed on the National Register of Historic Places since September 12, 1985.
