= Tom Talbot =

American painter

- Born: 1936; Broken Bow, Nebraska, U.S.
- Died: 2009 (aged 72–73); Chicago, Illinois, U.S.
- Education: American Academy of Art
- Occupation: Painter

Tom Talbot (1936–2009) was an American painter. His work can be seen at the Museum of Nebraska Art. Four of his murals are in the Arrow Hotel in Broken Bow, Nebraska.
