= Kilfoil Township, Custer County, Nebraska =

Kilfoil Township
- Township
- Location in Custer County
- Coordinates: 41°29′19″N 099°47′55″W
- Country: United States
- State: Nebraska
- County: Custer

Area
  - Total: 115.28 sq mi (298.57 km^{2})
  - Land: 115.24 sq mi (298.48 km^{2})
  - Water: 0.035 sq mi (0.09 km^{2}) 0.03%
- Elevation: 2,644 ft (806 m)

Population (2020)
  - Total: 592
  - Density: 5.14/sq mi (1.98/km^{2})
- GNIS feature ID: 0838078

Kilfoil Township is one of thirty-one townships in Custer County, Nebraska, United States. The population was 592 at the 2020 census. A 2021 estimate placed the township's population at 587.

The Village of Merna lies within the Township.

== See also ==
- County government in Nebraska
