= Ben Thomas (photographer) =

Australian photographer

== Early life ==
Thomas was born in 1981 in Adelaide, Australia. After developing his photographic skills making music videos, Thomas moved to Melbourne and switched to SLR still photography.

== Career in photography ==
Thomas uses a number of photographic and post processing techniques, mostly concentrating on the use of colour, perspective and a miniaturisation technique called "tilt shift photography". He has been exhibited internationally, been featured by Apple, Adobe, and won the 2018 Hasselblad Masters along with the ACMP Projections Art Photographer of the Year Award in 2008.

Thomas was the winner of the 2015 125Live Vision, Innovative Photographer of the year award. And also the 2015 Desktop Create Awards Photography category winner

Using a helicopter to take high-angle photographs, Thomas created a series of miniatures entitled "Cityshrinker" in 2007, depicting a number of cities around the world. This work was finalised in his book, Tiny Tokyo; The Big City Made Mini. (Chronicle Books) which brought about the end of Cityshrinker and a hiatus from photography while developing new work.

Thomas has also created a collection of photographs which he has called "Accession", in which large urban scenes are deconstructed and reconstructed in a kaleidoscopic style. Thomas has also exhibited a number of his landscape and still images internationally. He had represented Sony as part of the Sony Xperia Academy, showcasing Sony's flagship mobile camera capabilities.

Thomas was a 2015 artist in residence at the Villa Lena Foundation, Tuscany cited as the inspiration and genesis of the "Chroma" series.

Thomas was commissioned by The New Yorker Magazine for an artwork for the 7 March 2016 edition's short story, "Buttony" and again in March 2017 for the photoessay 'Dubai, the worlds Vegas'. Thomas' "Chroma" series was also featured by Apple for their 2018 iPad Pro announcement.

Ben is a recipient of the 2018 Hasselblad Masters award and is now an ambassador for the brand.
