= St. Anselm's Catholic Church, Rectory and Parish Hall =

Historic church in Nebraska, United States

- U.S. National Register of Historic Places
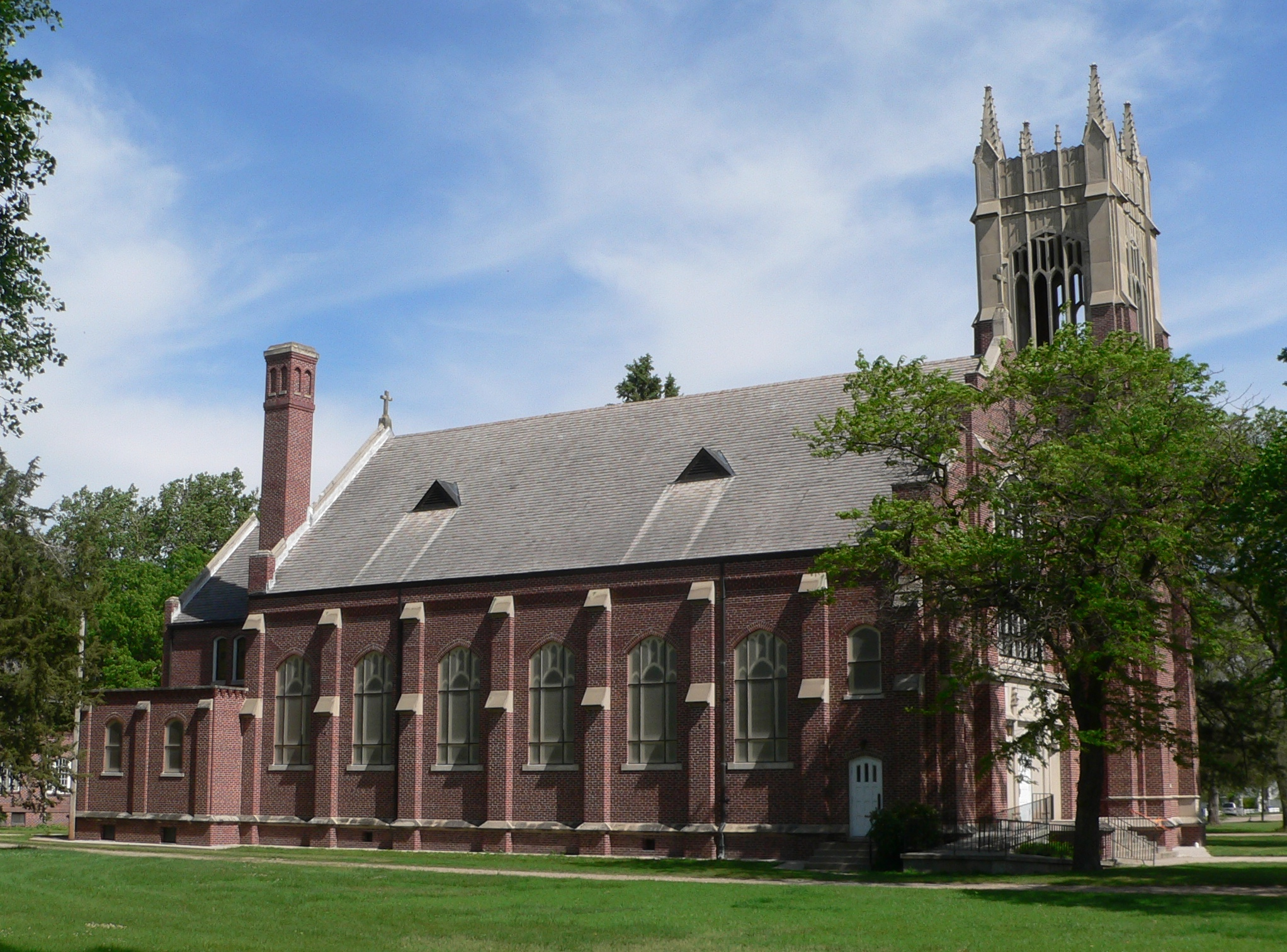
- St. Anselm's Catholic Church, 2010

- Location within Nebraska Location within the United States
- Location: NE 2, Anselmo, Nebraska
- Coordinates: 41°36′58″N 99°51′59″W
- Area: 7.3 acres (3.0 ha)
- Built: 1905, 1928–1929
- Built by: Leo Worth & John Brock
- Architect: Lahr & Stangel
- Architectural style: Late Gothic Revival, Bungalow/craftsman
- NRHP reference No.: 08000170
- Added to NRHP: March 12, 2008

St. Anselm's Catholic Church, Rectory and Parish Hall in Anselmo, Nebraska are three separate structures that together form the St. Anselm parish complex. The church, also known as The Cathedral of the Sandhills, was built in 1928–1929, along with the rectory; the parish hall was constructed in 1905 and served as the original church building.

The complex was listed on the National Register of Historic Places in 2008 for its Late Gothic Revival and Bungalow/Craftsman architecture. The listing includes four contributing buildings on 7.3 acres (3.0 ha).

== Church ==
St. Anselm's Catholic Church was built in 1928–1929 in the Late Gothic Revival style. The buildings measures 112.5 feet (34.3 m) by 47 feet (14 m). M.S. Lahr and Carl Stangel of Omaha drew the plans for the church and rectory, which were built by Leo Worth and John Brock of Columbus, although local men contributed largely to the project. The structure's exterior is covered in brick with stone details, while the foundation consists of concrete blocks. The roof, supported by steel beams, is gabled and covered in asphalt shingles. A belltower on the church's northeast corner is 95 feet (29 m) high, with limestone spires and traceries carved by stonecutters in Kansas, from which the limestone originated.

A large arched Gothic window dominates the church's front facade. Under it are three doorways: one with double doors in the center and one on each side of it with single doors. "INTROIBO AD ALTARE DEI", which translates to "I will go to the altar of God", is carved over the central doorway, while an Alpha and an Omega are carved over the side doors.

Six pairs of arched windows with Gothic design line the sides of the structure; between them are placed engaged buttresses with limestone caps.

Inside, the ceiling rafters are visible, ending in brackets with volutes. Stained glass windows are located on the walls to the north and south of the marble altar, which was installed in 1948. The original light fixtures are present, as are the original pews. Doors in the sanctuary provide access to a room used for the vestment of the priest for Mass, and to another used as an office.

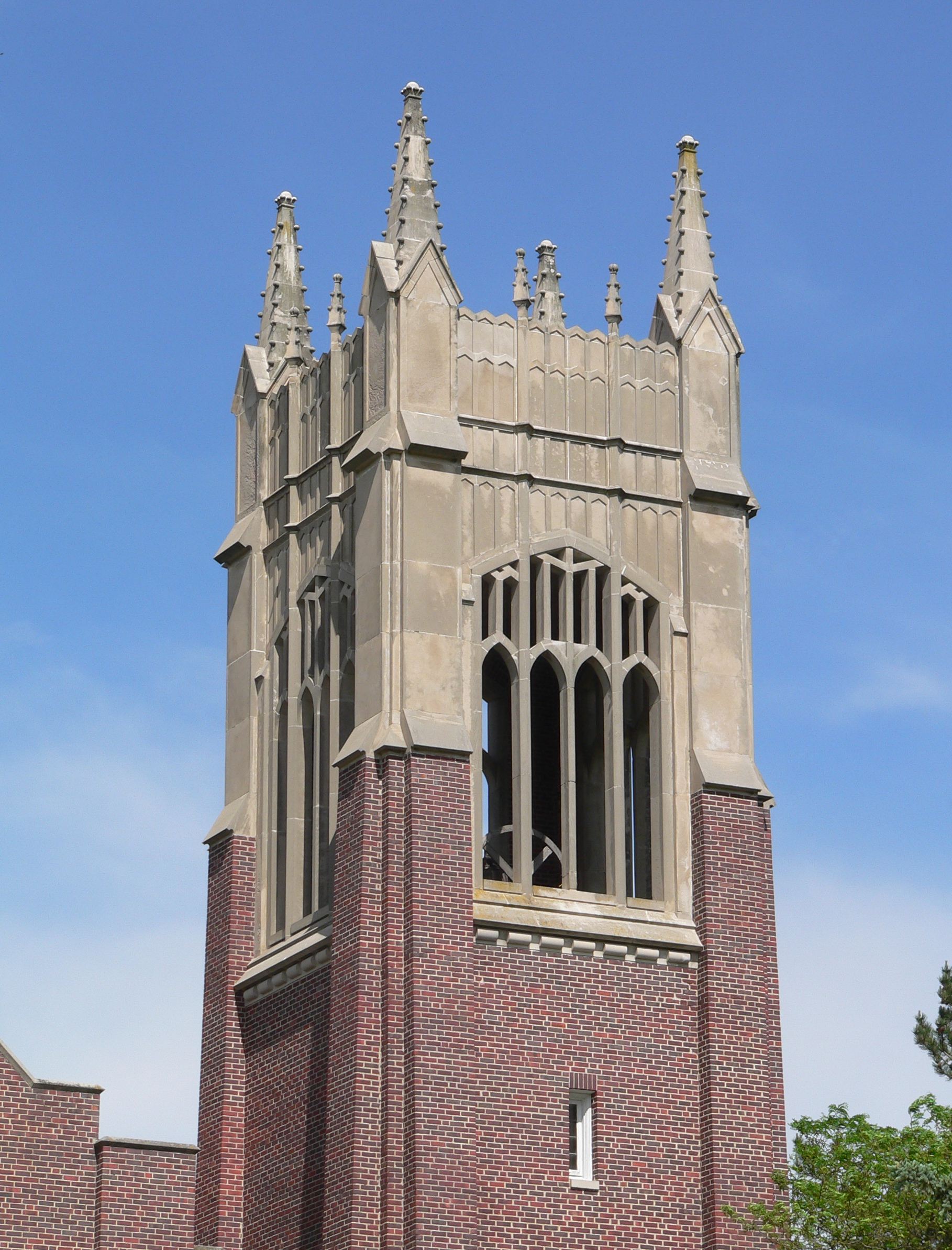
Belltower detail

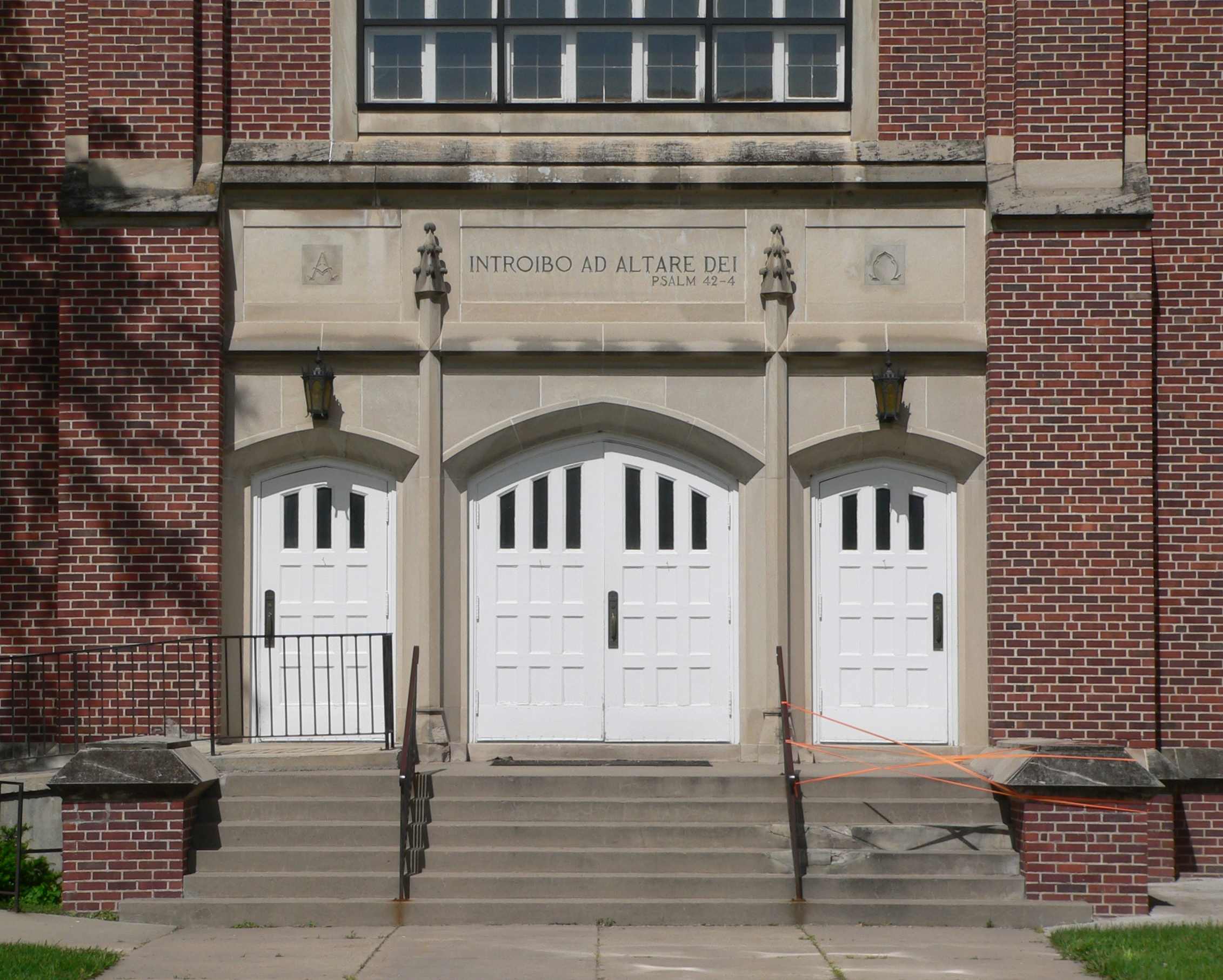
Main entry

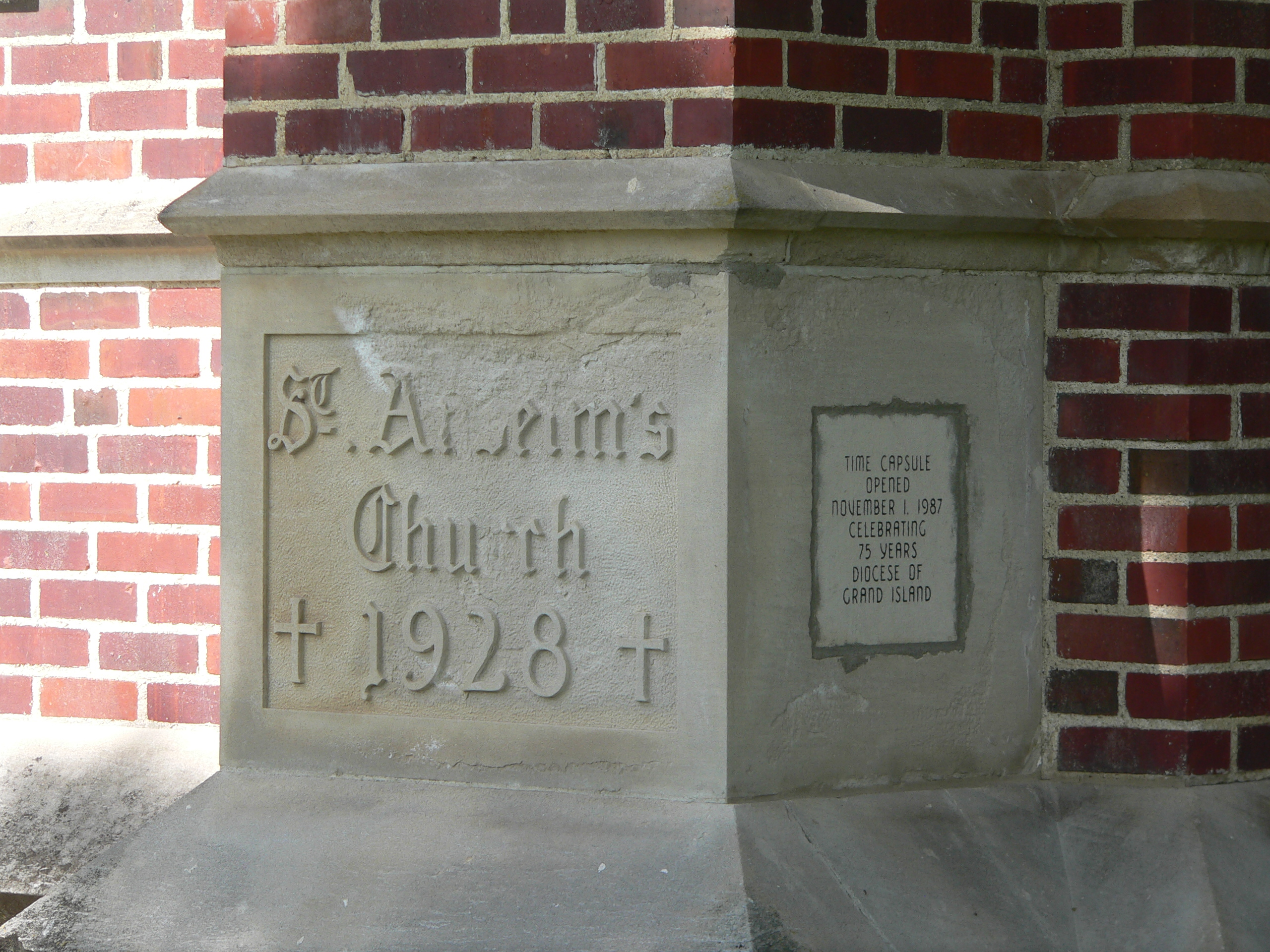
Cornerstone

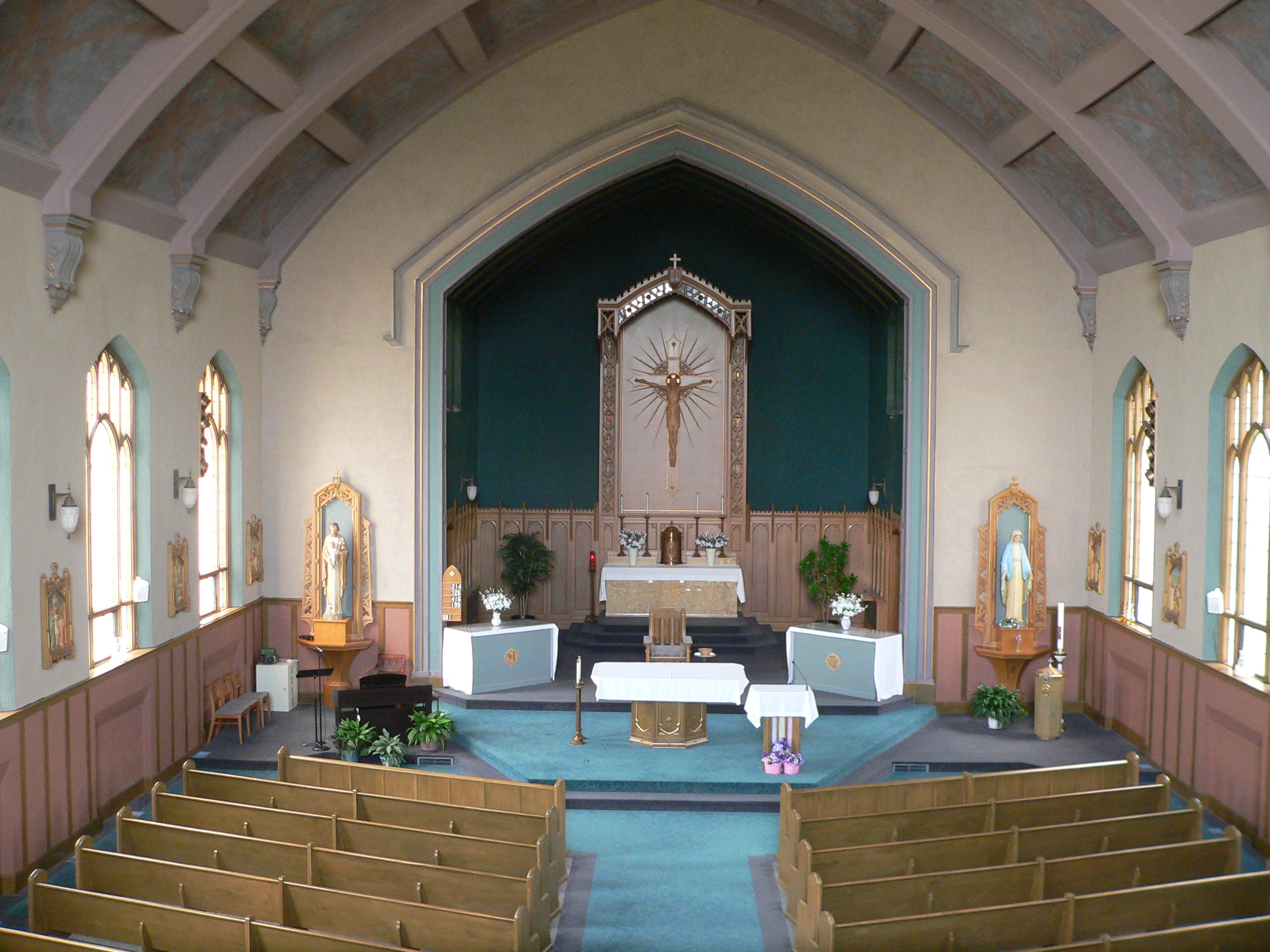
Interior

== Rectory ==
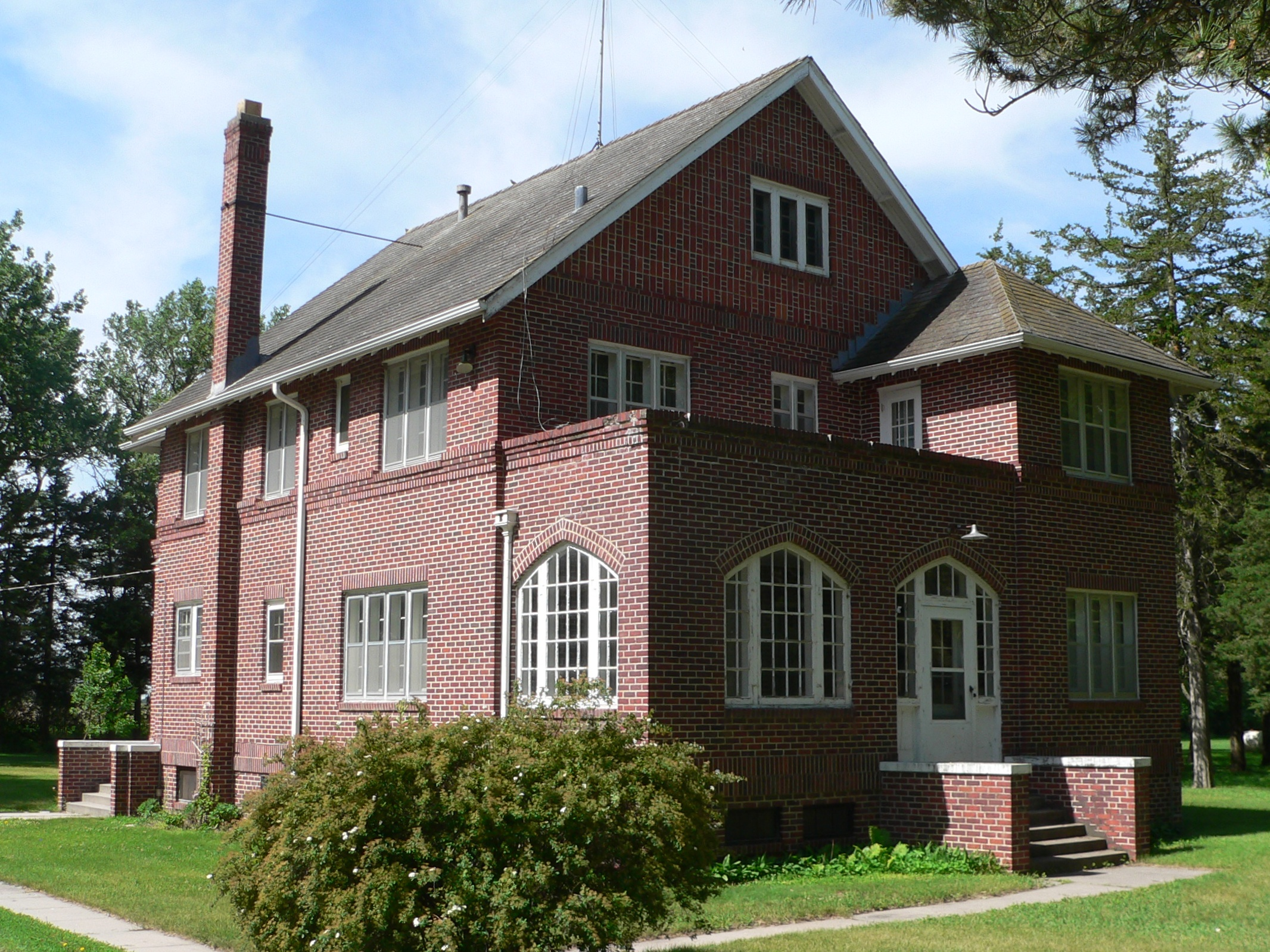
Rectory from southeast

The parish rectory, placed west of the church, was built in 1928–1929 in the Craftsman style. The structure measures 40 feet (12 m) by 32 feet (9.8 m). Like the church, it rests on a concrete block foundation and has brick exterior walls. Also like the church, the house's roof is gabled and covered with asphalt shingles. The house has two stories and a basement, with a small projection on the northwest corner. The rectory's enclosed porch has arched window and a flat roof, which doubles as a balcony for one of the second-floor bedrooms.

Dark woodwork is present throughout the eight-room interior of the building. A wooden Craftsman staircase leads to the upper story; the rectory also features a telephone nook, broad baseboards, French doors, and a built-in butler's pantry.

A wooden one-car garage stands southeast of the rectory and is a contributing building on the listing.

== Parish hall ==
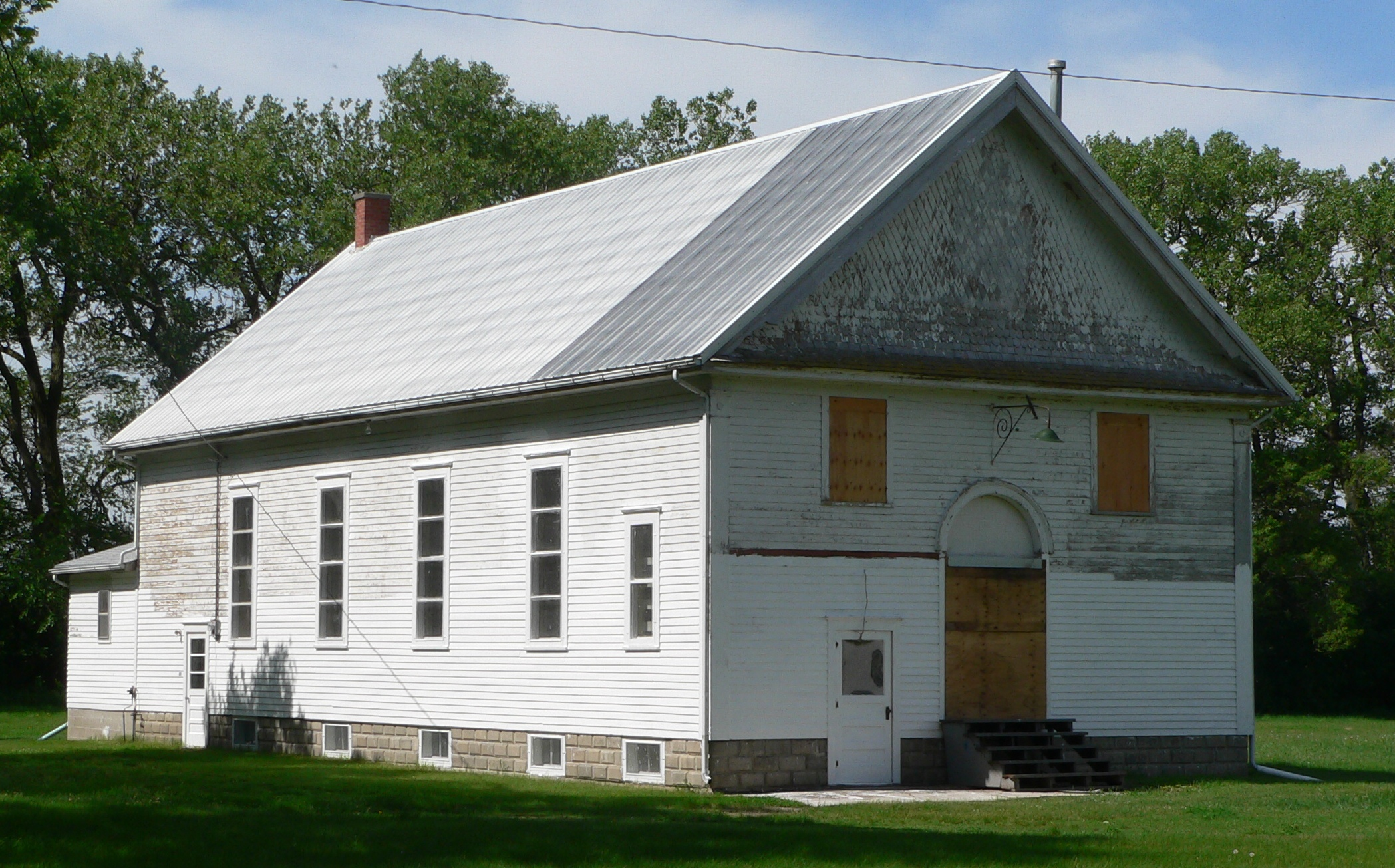
Parish Hall from southeast

The parish hall, constructed in 1905, is the oldest building on the listing, having originally been the parish church. It was construction is typical of wooden frame halls built during the early 1900s. It was moved onto the grounds of the new church in 1941. The one-story structure has a gabled roof and is covered in wooden siding.

The main portion of the building houses a single large room which was former used as the sanctuary. The space retains its original pressed tin ceiling, cornice, and pews. The former choir loft has been boarded up with plywood. A ground-level door was added to the front of the building after the structure was moved to its new location in 1941 to provide access to the basement, which contains a kitchen and fellowship area. An addition on the back of the building contains restrooms.
