= Miniature faking =

Photography technique

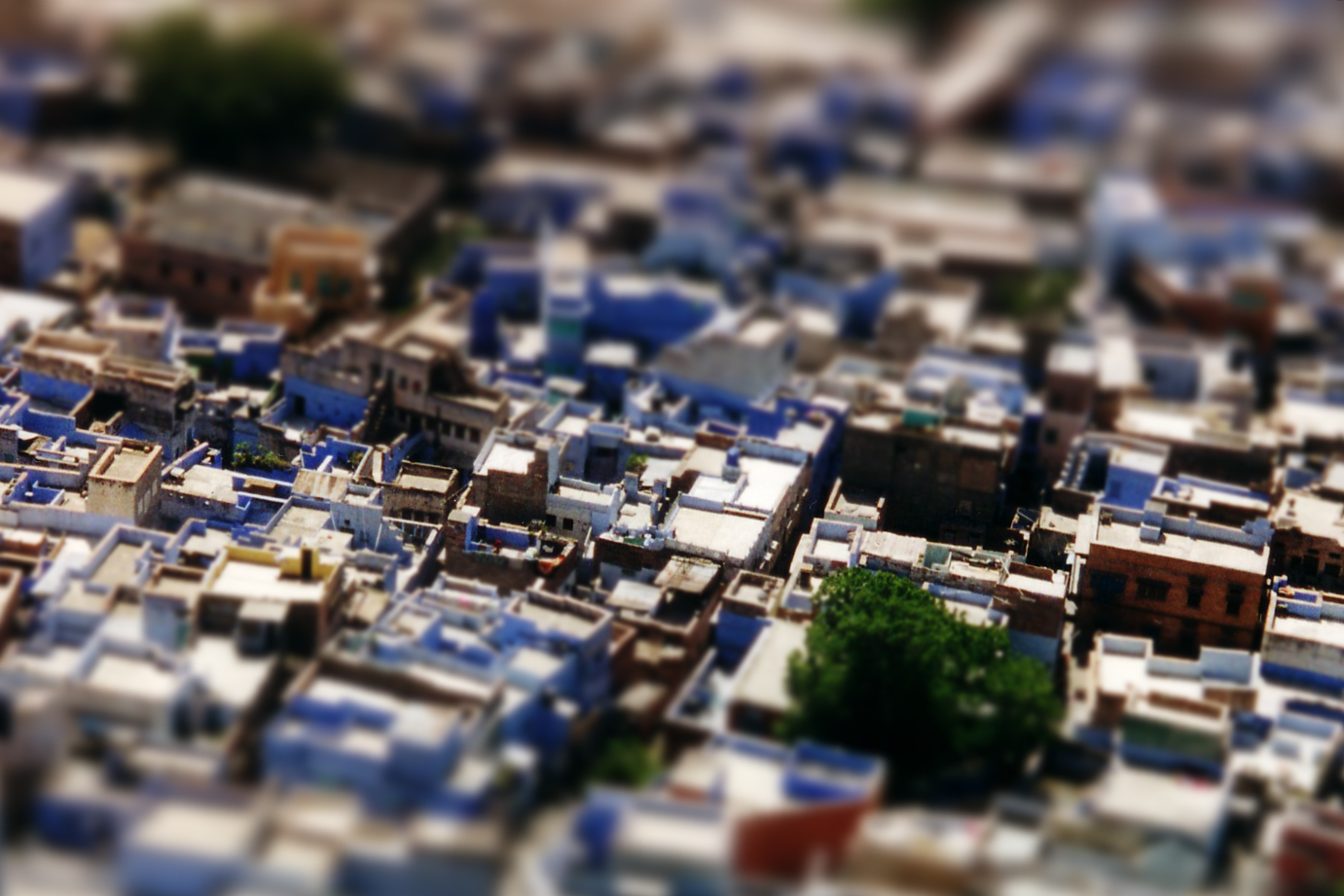
Digitally blurred miniature fake of Jodhpur

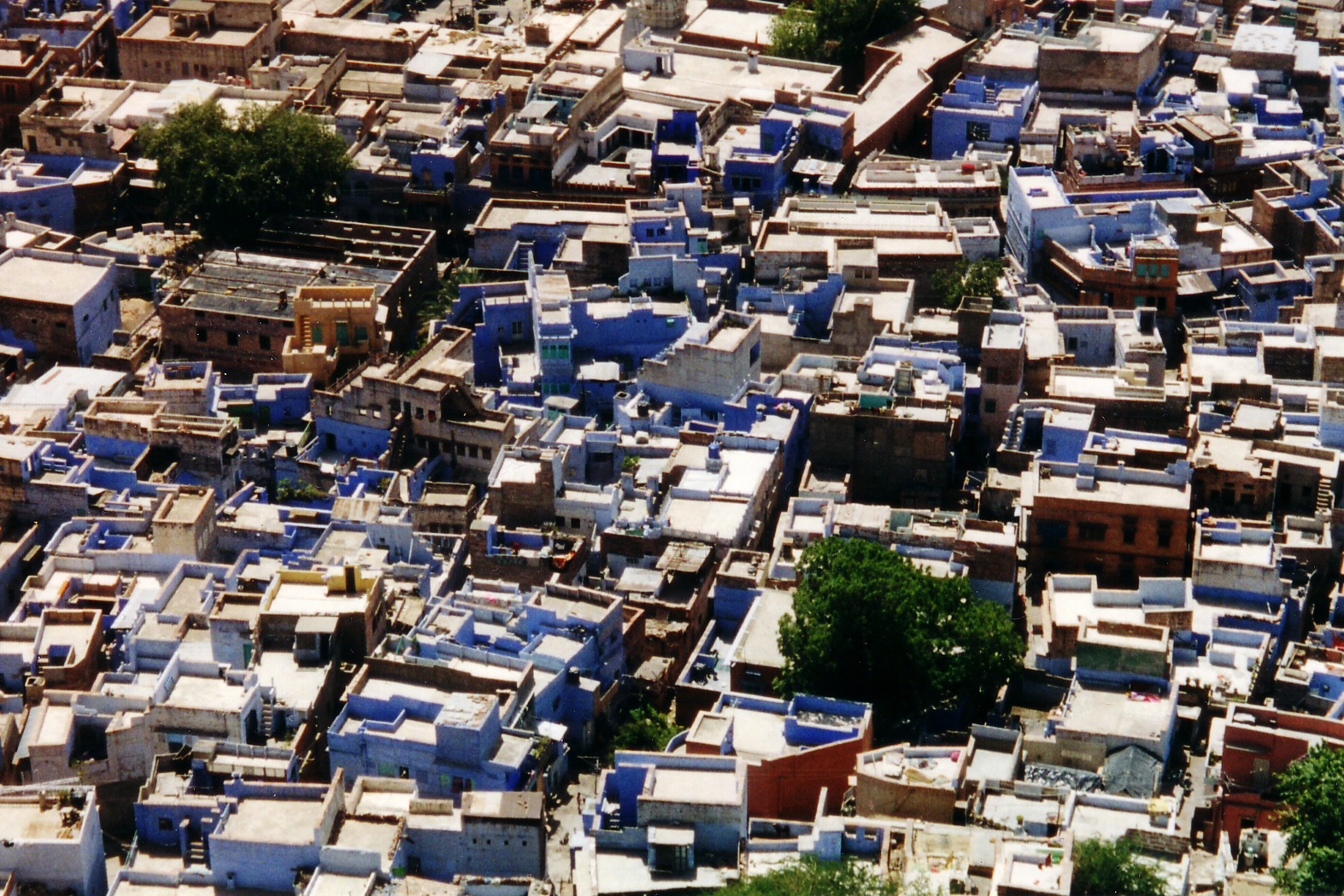
Original photo of Jodhpur

Miniature faking, also known as the diorama effect, diorama illusion, or the doll house effect is a process in which a photograph of a life-size location or object is made to look like a photograph of a miniature scale model. Blurring parts of the photo simulates the shallow depth of field normally encountered in close-up photography, making the scene seem much smaller than it actually is; the blurring can be done either optically when the photograph is taken, or by digital postprocessing. Many diorama effect photographs are taken from a high angle to simulate the effect of looking down on a miniature. Tilt–shift photography is also associated with miniature faking.

For video sequences, a way of strengthening the miniature impression is to run the video at a higher speed than it was recorded. This appears to reduce the inertia which would normally limit the motion of large objects.

== Characteristics of images ==
In a typical scene, objects close to the camera are at the bottom of the image, and objects far from the camera are at the top. This is less true if the image includes significant height as well as depth; a tall object near the camera can extend the height of the entire image.

Only one plane can be in precise focus. Objects not in the plane of focus are blurred; the blurring increases with distance from the plane of focus. But blurring less than a certain amount is imperceptible under normal viewing conditions; objects for which blurring is imperceptible are within the depth of field (DoF).

DoF decreases as magnification increases; in a close-up photograph of a miniature scene, the DoF is limited, and it often is impossible to have everything appear sharp even at the lens's smallest aperture. Consequently, the foreground and background are often blurred, with the blur increasing with distance above or below the center of the image. In a photograph of a full-size scene, the DoF is considerably greater; in some cases, it is difficult to have much of the scene outside the DoF, even at the lens's maximum aperture. Thus a difference in DoF is one characteristic by which a photograph of a full-size scene is readily distinguished from one of a miniature model.

In typical photographs, there are no optical cues that specify the distance to objects (how far they are from the observation point) and so distance has to be inferred from the size of familiar objects in the scene. DoF blurring is a visual cue to distance. In a diorama illusion, the introduction of the blur cue appears to override this familiar information causing objects to appear miniature and toy-like.

== Techniques ==
A common technique for making an image of a full-size scene resemble an image of a miniature model is to have the image progressively blurred from the center to the top and center to the bottom, simulating the blurring due to the limited DoF of a typical image of a miniature. The blurring can be accomplished either optically or with digital postprocessing.

=== Optical ===
Miniatures can be simulated optically by using lens tilt, although the effect is somewhat different from the shallow depth of field (DoF) that normally results from macro photography.

In a normal photograph (i.e. one not using tilt):

- The DoF extends between two parallel planes on either side of the plane of focus; the DoF is finite in depth but infinite in height and width.
- The sharpness gradients on each side of the DoF are along the line of sight.
- Objects at the same distance from the camera are rendered equally sharp.
- Objects at significantly different distances from the camera are rendered with unequal sharpness.

In a photograph using tilt:

- The DoF extends between two planes on either side of the plane of focus that intersect at a point beneath the lens (see Depth of field in the Scheimpflug principle article for an illustration).
- The DoF is wedge shaped, with the apex of the wedge near the camera, and the height of the wedge increasing with distance from the camera.
- When the plane of focus is at a substantial angle to the image plane, the DoF can be small in height but infinite in width and depth.
- The sharpness gradients are at an angle to the line of sight. When the plane of focus is almost perpendicular to the image plane, the sharpness gradients are almost perpendicular to the line of sight.
- When the plane of focus is at a substantial angle to the image plane, objects at the same distance from the camera are rendered with unequal sharpness, depending on their positions in the scene.
- Objects at greatly different distances from the camera are rendered sharp if they are within the DoF wedge.

Despite the differences, for a scene that includes relatively little height, lens tilt can produce a result similar to that of a miniature scene, especially if the image is taken from above at a moderate angle to the ground. For a completely flat surface, the effect using tilt would be almost the same as that with a regular lens: the region of focus would be sharp, with progressive blurring toward the top or bottom of the image. The image of Jodhpur was made from such a scene; although the blurring was accomplished with digital postprocessing, a similar result could have been obtained using tilt.

The diorama effect using tilt is less effective if a scene includes objects of significant height, such as tall buildings or trees, especially when photographed at a small angle to the ground, because there is a sharpness gradient along surfaces that are obviously the same distance from the camera.

Though probably less common, similar difficulties arise if an object has significant extent along the line of sight, such as a long train receding from view, again photographed at a small angle to the ground, because parts of the train that are obviously at considerably different distances from the camera are rendered equally sharp.

With a view camera, tilt can usually be set with movements built into the camera; with a small- or medium-format camera, a tilt/shift lens or adapter is usually required.

=== Digital postprocessing ===
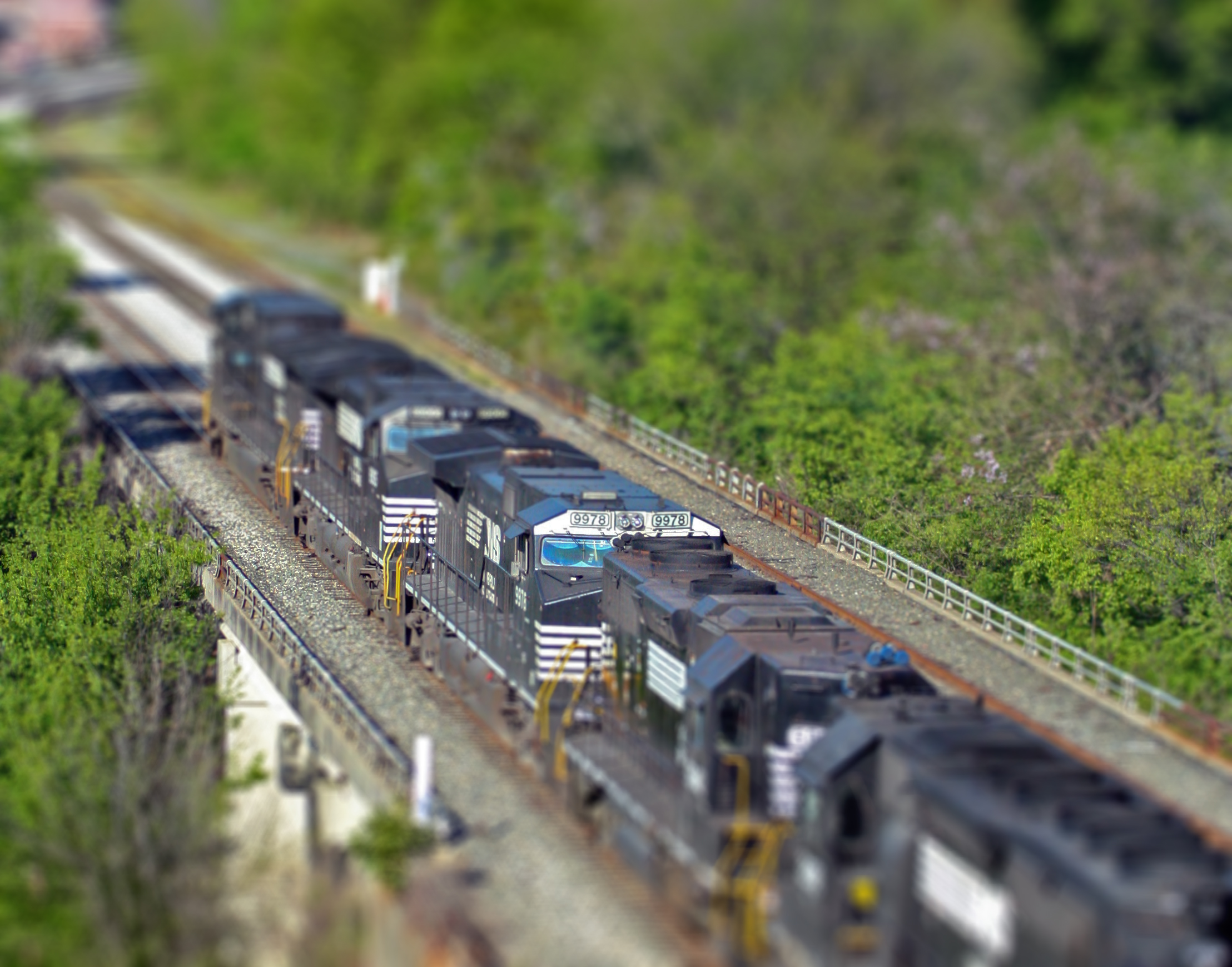
A digitally blurred image of a Norfolk Southern freight train

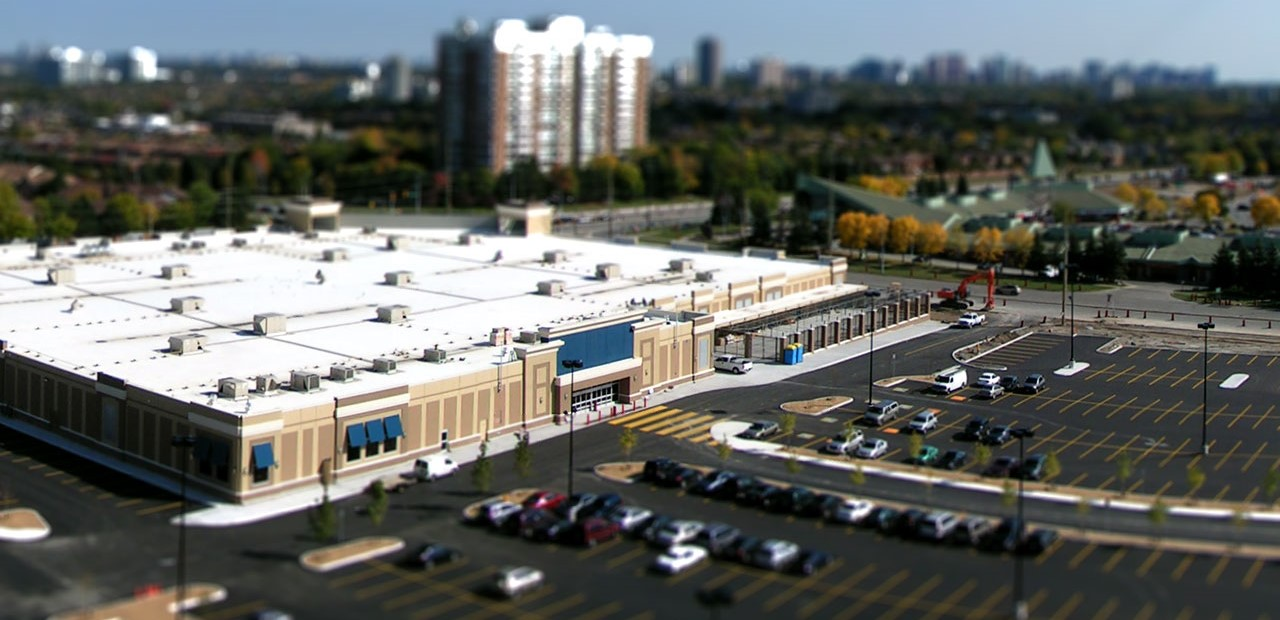
Miniature simulation taken at a low angle to the ground

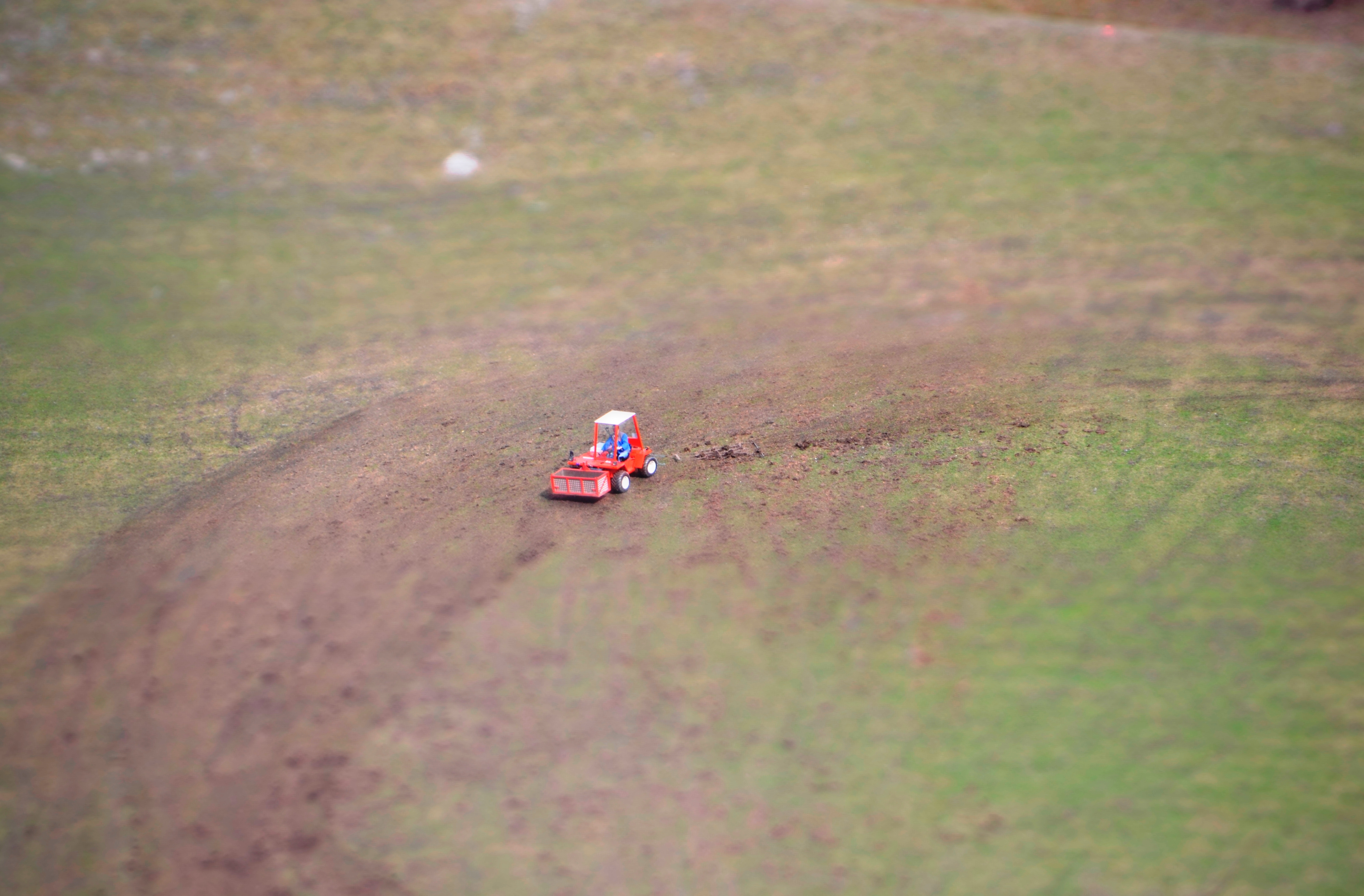
Miniature faking of an agricultural vehicle in Austria

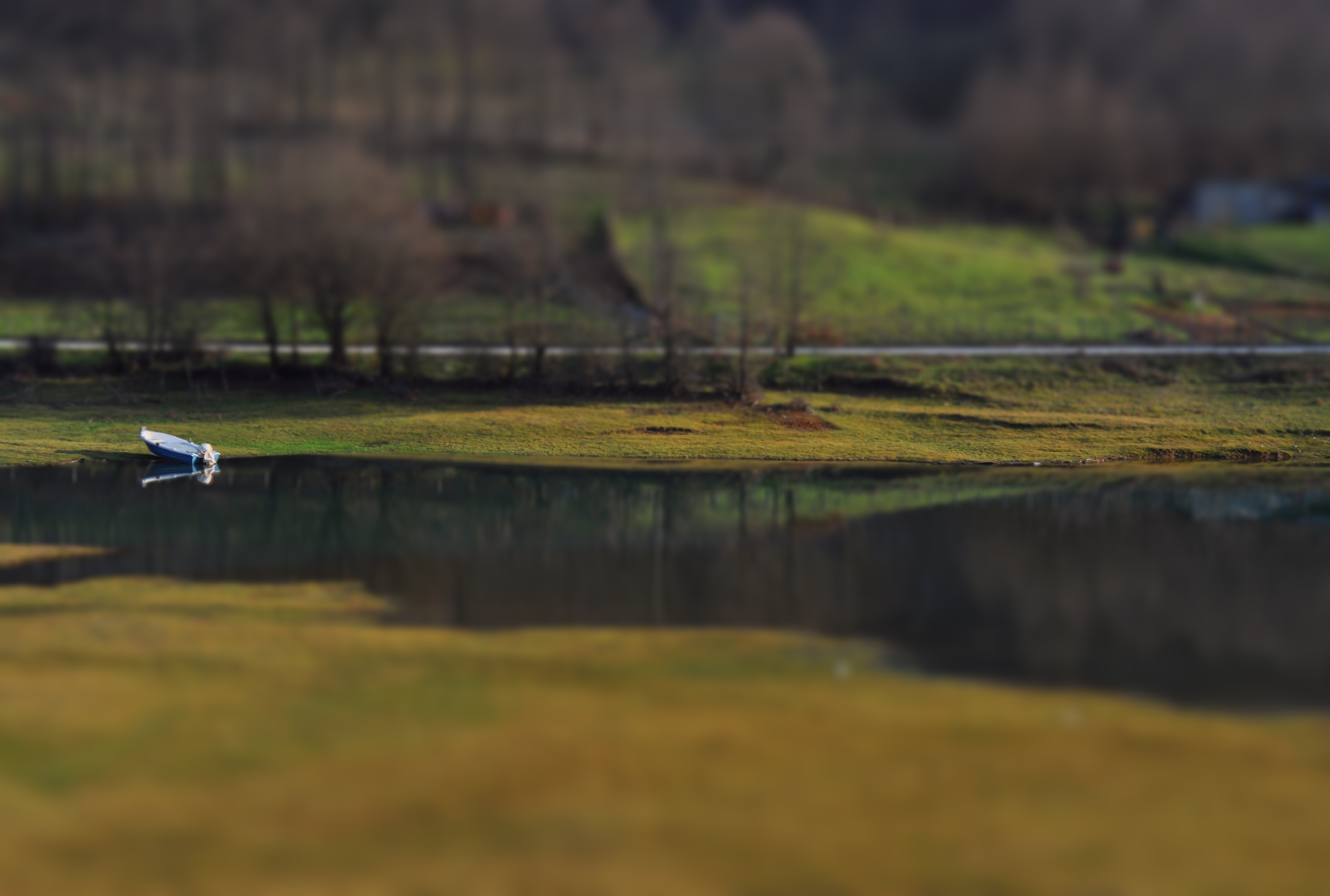
Miniature faking of Lake Plastiras' northernmost shore

A miniature can also be simulated digitally, using an image editor to blur the top and bottom of the photograph, so that only the subject is sharp. With basic techniques, e.g., a tool such as Adobe Photoshop's Lens Blur filter, using sharpness gradients extending from the middle of the image to the top and bottom, the effect is quite similar to that obtained using lens tilt.

The simple techniques have limitations similar to those of lens tilt. In the image of Jodhpur, the diorama simulation is quite effective, because the scene includes relatively little height and was photographed at a fairly high angle to the ground. The simulation is less convincing in the image of the train and in the image of the large, low building, because these scenes include several tall objects and were photographed at fairly low angles to the ground. In the image of the train, there is significant sharpness variation from the bottom of the train to the top, and the same is true for many of the trees, even though the tops and bottoms of these objects are at nearly the same distances from the camera. Similar effects occur in the image of the large, low building; although the diorama simulation of the main subject is reasonable, there are noticeable sharpness differences from top to bottom on the nearest light poles and on the taller building in the background, even though the tops and bottoms of these objects are at nearly the same distances from the camera.

More realistic simulation is possible using more advanced techniques. A simple depth map consisting of a linear gradient can be edited to give uniform sharpness to objects at the same distance from the camera. This effect cannot be achieved using lens tilt.

Even simple digital techniques afford greater flexibility than optical techniques, including the ability to choose the region of sharpness and the amount of blur for the unsharp areas after the photograph has been taken. In addition, digital miniature faking does not require a camera with movements or a special lens.

Other techniques to enhance the impression of a diorama scene are increasing the contrast of the picture, simulating the darker, harder shadows of a miniature under a light, and increasing the saturation of the picture to simulate the brighter colors of a painted miniature.

=== Digital techniques for motion pictures ===
An advanced use of the diorama effect in a motion picture was a process developed by Clark James, dubbed Smallgantics, for "Harrowdown Hill", a music video for Thom Yorke of Radiohead. The project was produced at Bent Image Lab in July 2006 and directed by filmmaker Chel White. In this instance, the false diorama effect was achieved digitally using helicopter footage of full-size vernal and urban landscapes that was broken down into separate planes. It involves hand creating as many as eight planes of z-buffering over live-action footage, one frame at a time, resulting in an animated black and white matte (filmmaking) sequence. These mattes are then blended together with varying degrees of blur to create the effect of shallow depth of field.

== In popular culture ==
- The Late Show with Stephen Colbert used tilt-shift photography in its original opening credits sequence.
- The 2019 remake of The Legend of Zelda: Link's Awakening for the Nintendo Switch utilizes a tilt-shift graphical effect.
- The opening credits of the TV show Superstore use a tilt-shift clip of the interior of the store setting.
- The entire episode "Night of the Mini Dead" from the third volume of the anthology series Love, Death & Robots uses this effect.
- The artists of Magic: The Gathering used tilt-shift faking to create the art for cards depicting Segovia, a plane in which everything is extremely small.
