= Gerd Brenneis =

German opera singer

Gerd Brenneis (1 March 1930, Nienhagen, Mecklenburg-Vorpommern – 13 March 2003, Güstrow) was a German operatic tenor who had an active international career from the late 1950s through the 1990s. Known for his interpretations of the works of Richard Wagner, he worked as a principal artist at many of the world's great opera houses, including the Deutsche Oper Berlin, La Scala, the Metropolitan Opera, and the Vienna State Opera.

== Life and career ==
Brenneis was trained in the opera studio of the Berlin State Opera (BSO) where he began his performance career in the opera chorus during the 1950s. In 1958 he performed in the world premiere of Darius Milhaud's Fiesta at the BSO. In 1959 he began his career as a principal tenor at the Essen Opera House where he first appeared as Don Curzio in Mozart's The Marriage of Figaro. His first major critical success came soon after at that house in the title role of Britten's Albert Herring.

From 1961–1972 Brenneis was a leading tenor at Theater Augsburg. Here he achieved a reputation as a gifted Wagnerian tenor in roles like Walther von Stolzing in Die Meistersinger von Nürnberg, and the title heroes in Lohengrin and Parsifal. While still committed to Theater Augsburg, Brenneis was a principal artist at the Deutsche Oper am Rhein from 1970–1972. He was later under contract as a leading tenor at the Hamburg State Opera (1972–1977), the Staatsoper Stuttgart (1975–1977), and the Vienna State Opera (1976–1985). He made his debut at the Deutsche Oper Berlin in 1974 as Max in Der Freischütz, and was thereafter a resident artist at that house until 1996. One of his last great successes at that house was as Erik in Der fliegende Holländer in 1994.

In addition to his portrayal of Wagner heroes, Brenneis excelled in the roles of Max in Der Freischütz and Dimitrij in Boris Godunov. He worked extensively as a guest artist during his career. He appeared in several roles at the Bayreuth Festival in 1973 and 1974, including Siegmund in Die Walküre, Walther von der Vogelweide in Tannhäuser, and Walther von Stolzing.

In 1975 Brenneis made his debut at La Scala as Florestan in Fidelio under conductor Karl Böhm. In 1976, 1981, and 1983 he appeared as a guest artist at the Metropolitan Opera, portraying the roles of Froh in Das Rheingold, the Emperor in Die Frau ohne Schatten, Parsifal, Siegmund, Walther von Stolzing, and the title role in Tannhäuser. In 1988 he portrayed Siegfried in a complete production of Wagner's Der Ring des Nibelungen at the Opéra de Nice. Other important engagements included the Liceu (1977), New Orleans Opera (1977), the Maggio Musicale Fiorentino (1984), Teatro Regio di Turino (1984, 1988), and Pretoria Opera (1985). In 1981 he sang Lonengrin for his debut at the Palacio de Bellas Artes in Mexico City.

He portrayed the title role in the 1992 film version of Wagner's Rienzi with Jeannine Altmeyer as Irene. Other roles he performed on stage included Bacchus in Ariadne auf Naxos and Tristan in Tristan und Isolde. He was named a Kammersänger of the city of Berlin.
