= Custer County Courthouse (Broken Bow, Nebraska) =

- Custer County Courthouse and Jail
- U.S. National Register of Historic Places
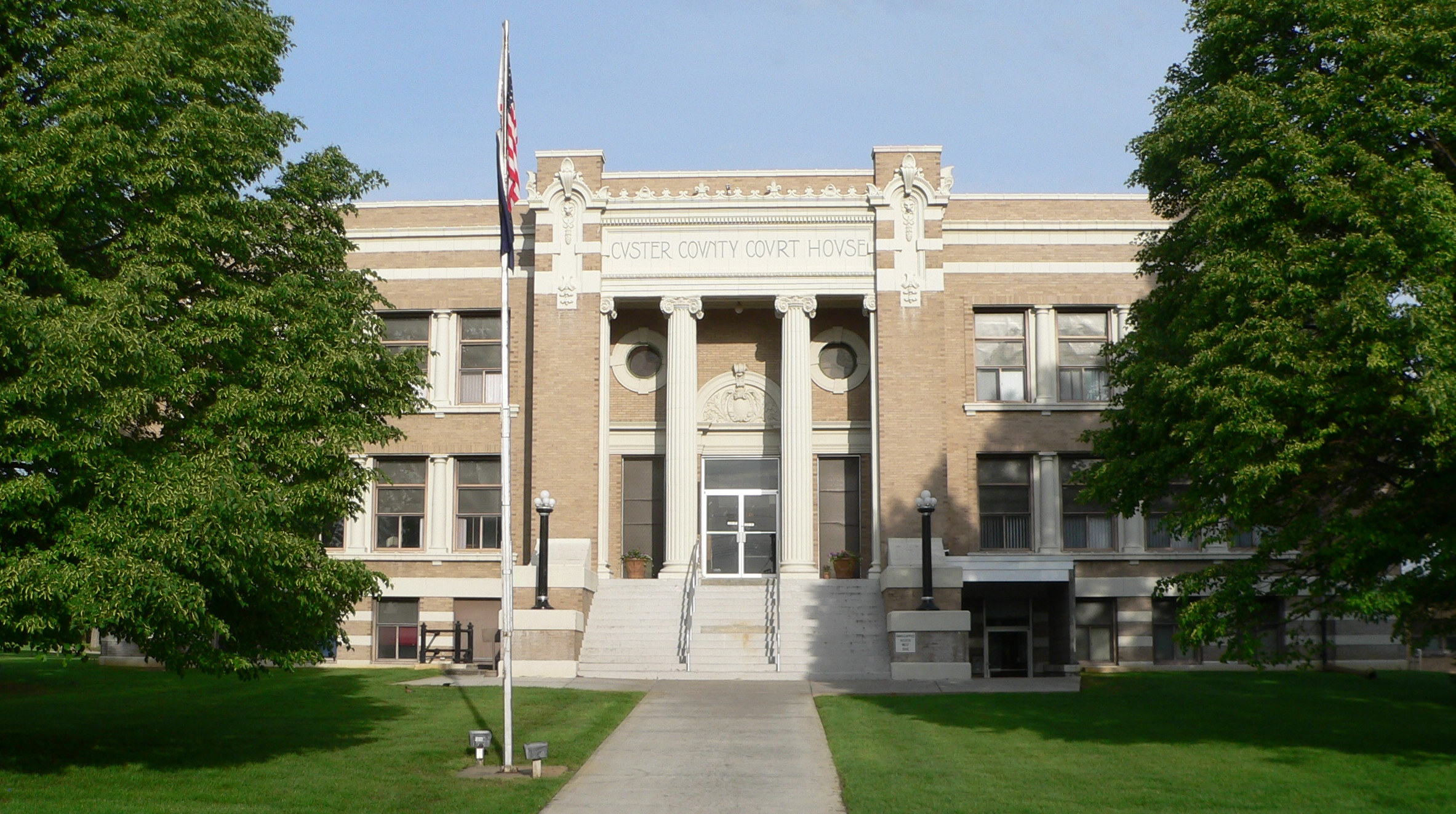

- Location within Nebraska Location within the United States
- Location: Courthouse Square, Main St., Broken Bow, Nebraska
- Coordinates: 41°24′09″N 99°38′32″W
- Area: 2 acres (0.81 ha)
- Built: 1911
- Architect: John Latenser
- Architectural style: Classical Revival
- NRHP reference No.: 79001435
- Added to NRHP: April 19, 1979

The Custer County Courthouse in Broken Bow, Nebraska was listed on the National Register of Historic Places as Custer County and Jail in 1979. It was built in 1911.

It was designed by Liechtenstein-born architect John Latenser in Classical Revival style.
