= Brenizer method =

Photographic technique

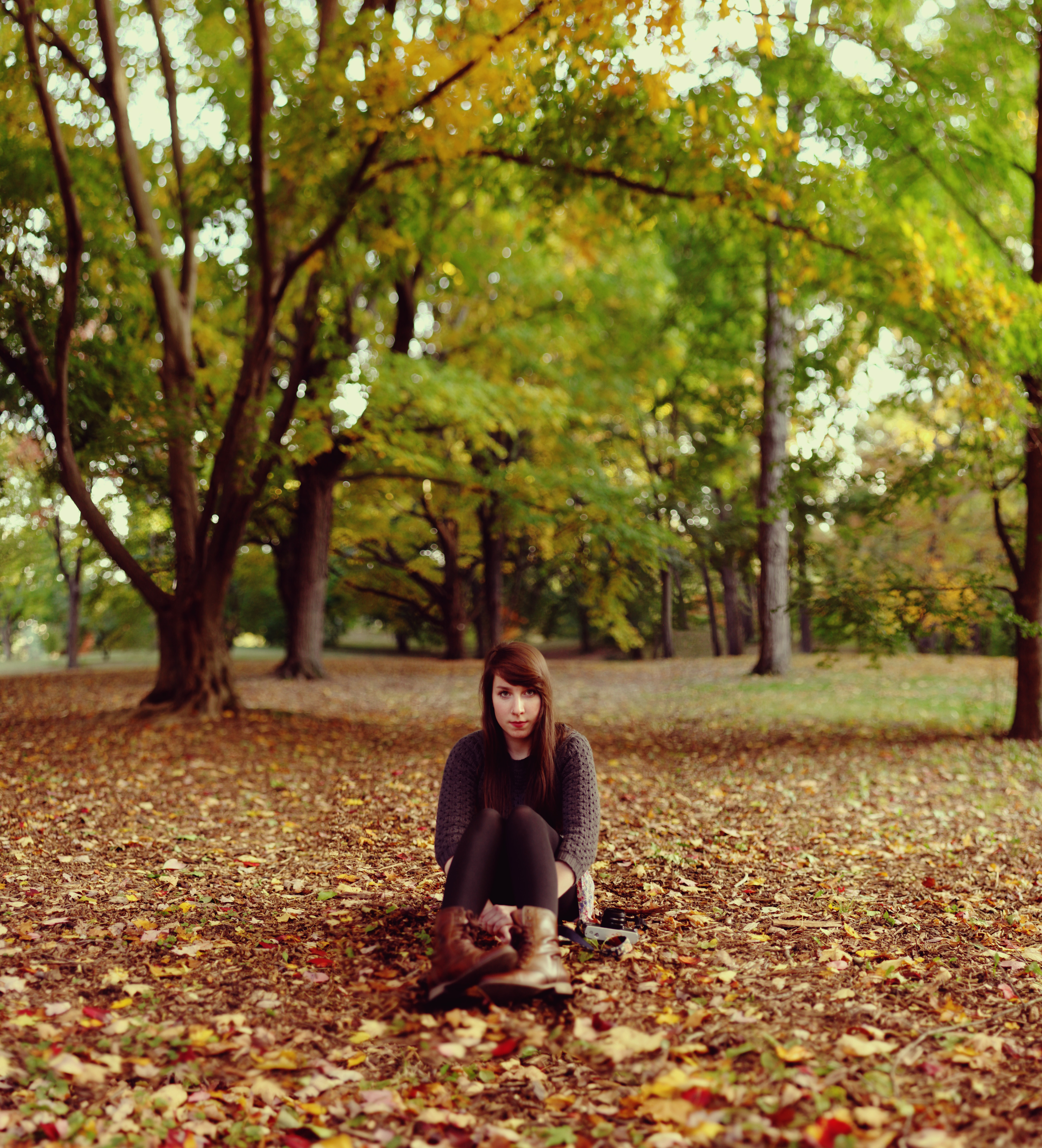
An example of the Brenizer method

The Brenizer method, sometimes referred to as bokeh panorama or bokehrama, is a photographic technique characterized by the creation of a digital image exhibiting a shallow depth of field in tandem with a wide angle of view. Created by use of panoramic stitching techniques applied to portraiture, it was popularized by photographer Ryan Brenizer.

The combination of these characteristics enables a photographer to mimic the look of large format film photography with a digital camera. Large format cameras use a negative that is at least 4×5 inches (102×127 mm) and are known for their very shallow depth of field when using a wide aperture and their unique high level of clarity, contrast and control. Image sensor formats of common digital cameras, in comparison, are much smaller, ranging down to the tiny sensors in camera phones. The Brenizer method increases the effective sensor size of the camera, simulating the characteristics of large format photography.

While the aesthetics of this form of imaging most closely resemble large format analog photography, its look has also led it to being compared to tilt shift photography. Both techniques create images that exhibit an unusually shallow depth of field.

== History, method and usage ==
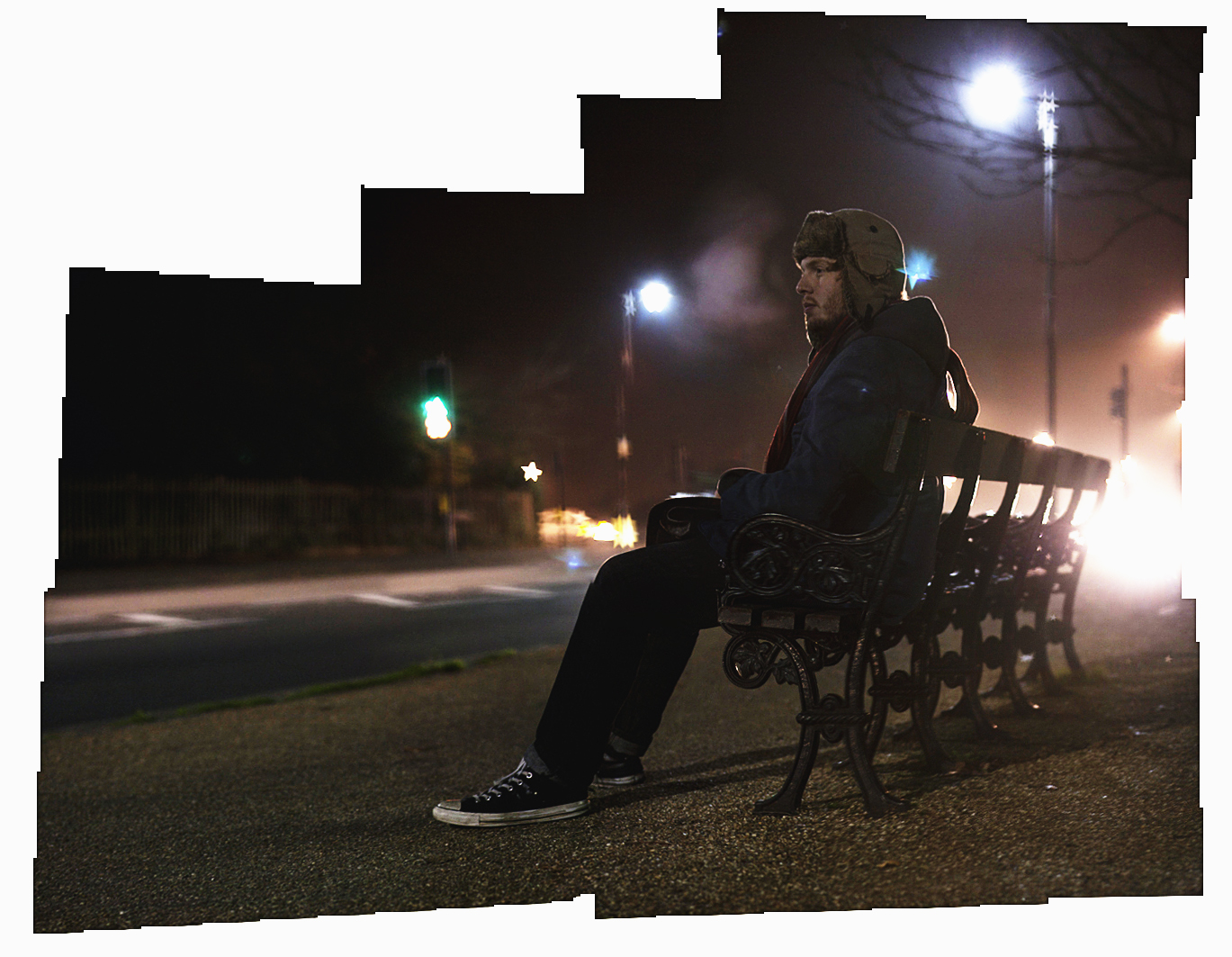
Multiple images being composited

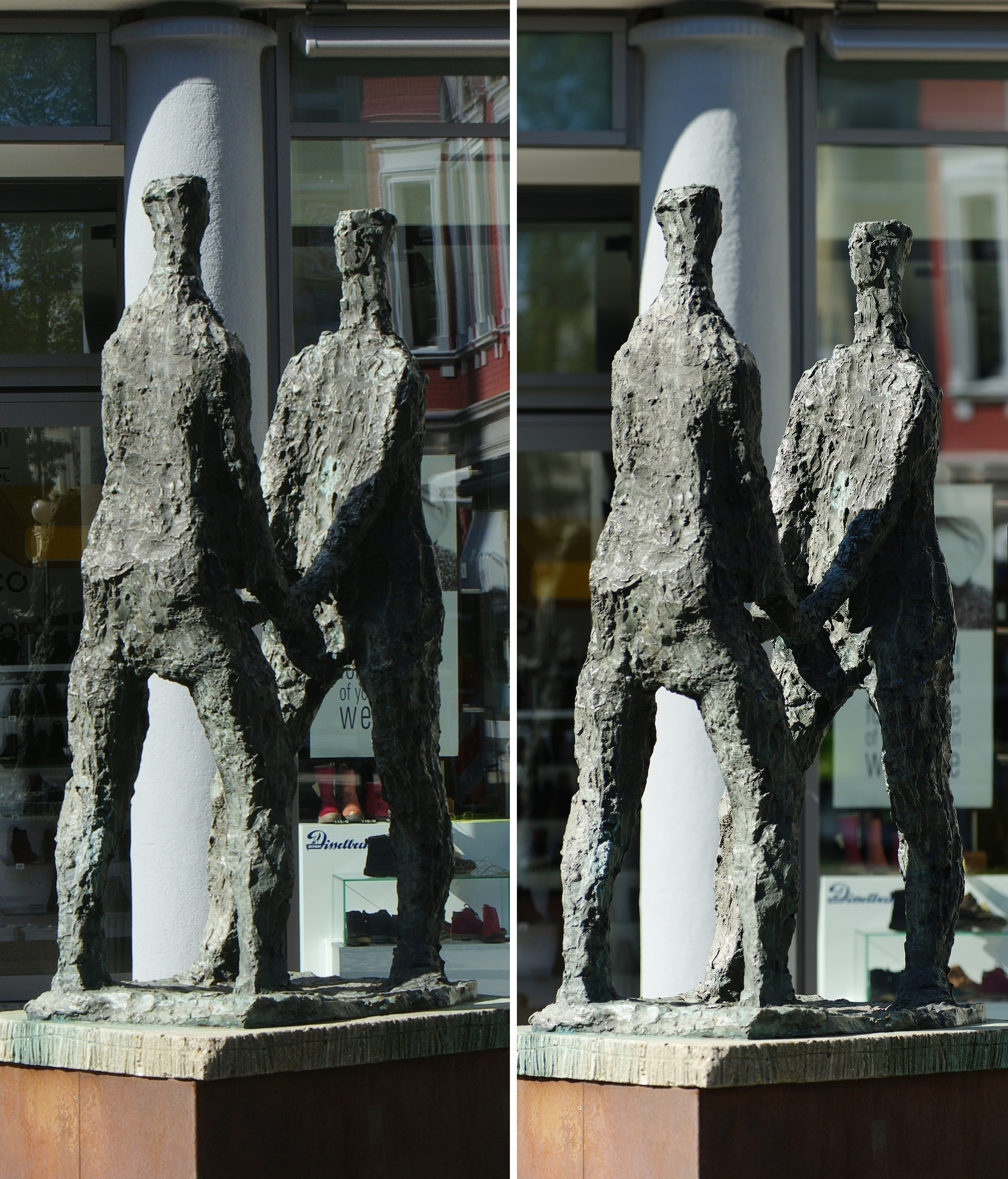
Direct comparison of an image taken using the Brenizer method (right) and a single image taken at the same angle of view, shooting distance, and aperture setting (left).

Ryan Brenizer initially referred to the technique as a bokeh panorama. It uses panoramic stitching, for the purpose of applying the shallow depth-of-field associated with wide-aperture telephoto lenses to a wider-field-of-view composition.

Shallow depth of field panoramic stitching photographs are sometimes referred to as the Brenizer method, as he popularized it in recent years through his work. An image produced by this method is sometimes referred to as a bokeh panorama (or the portmanteau bokehrama) in reference to the deliberate blurring style of bokeh photography.

The process requires taking multiple shots of a scene in a manner that allows for later image stitching using a fast lens, generally of a focal length of 50 mm or longer. It is also beneficial to use manual focus, manual white balance and manual shutter and aperture controls to maintain a uniform exposure across the entire set of images.

This method is of interest because:

- It allows for the cheap and relatively easy creation of aesthetics usually only available through the use of expensive, complicated and bulky equipment.
- It provides a way of imitating a traditional film-based process with digital equipment.
- It creates very high-resolution images.

The method is used for portrait photography and, increasingly, automobile photography.

== Examples ==

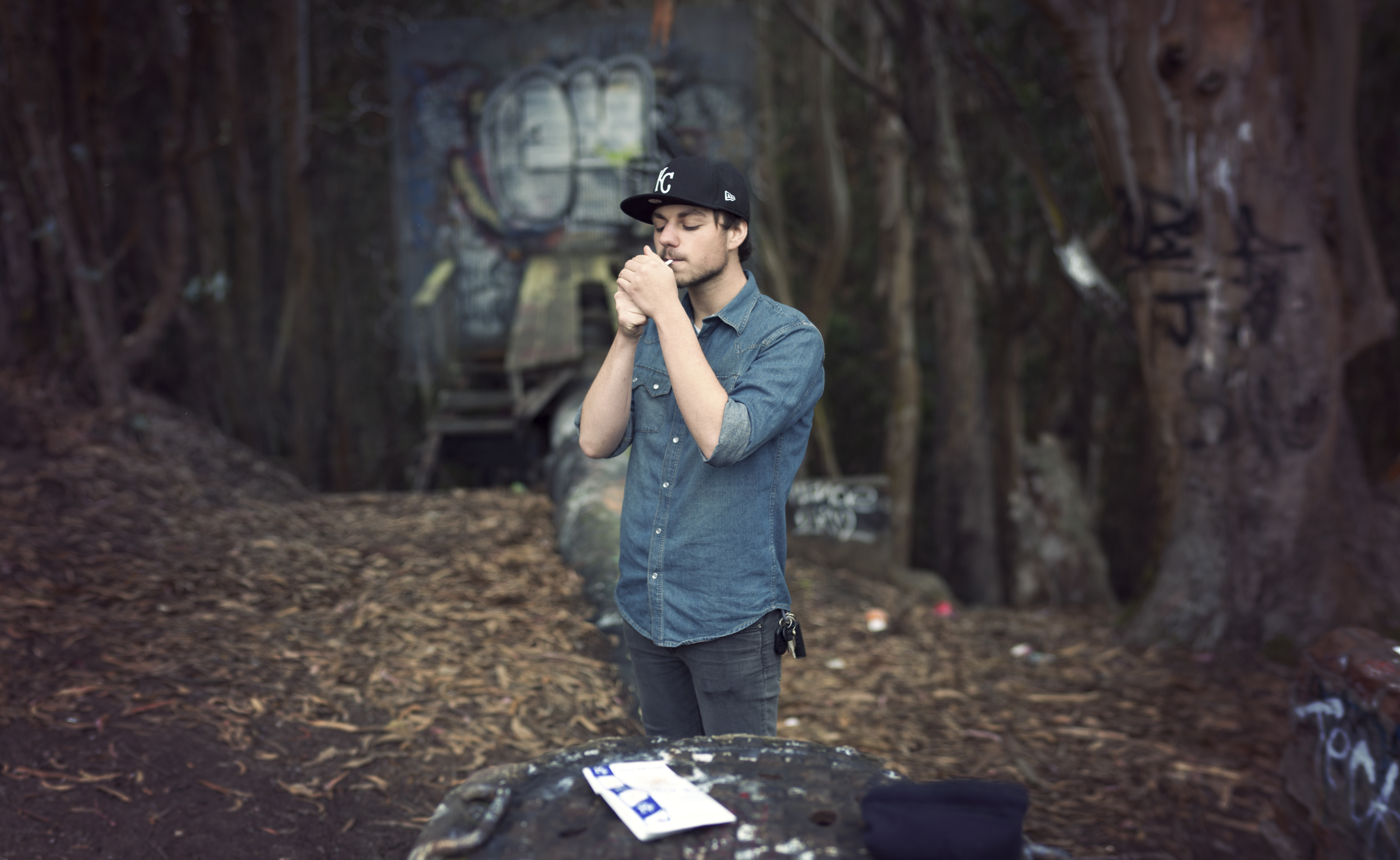

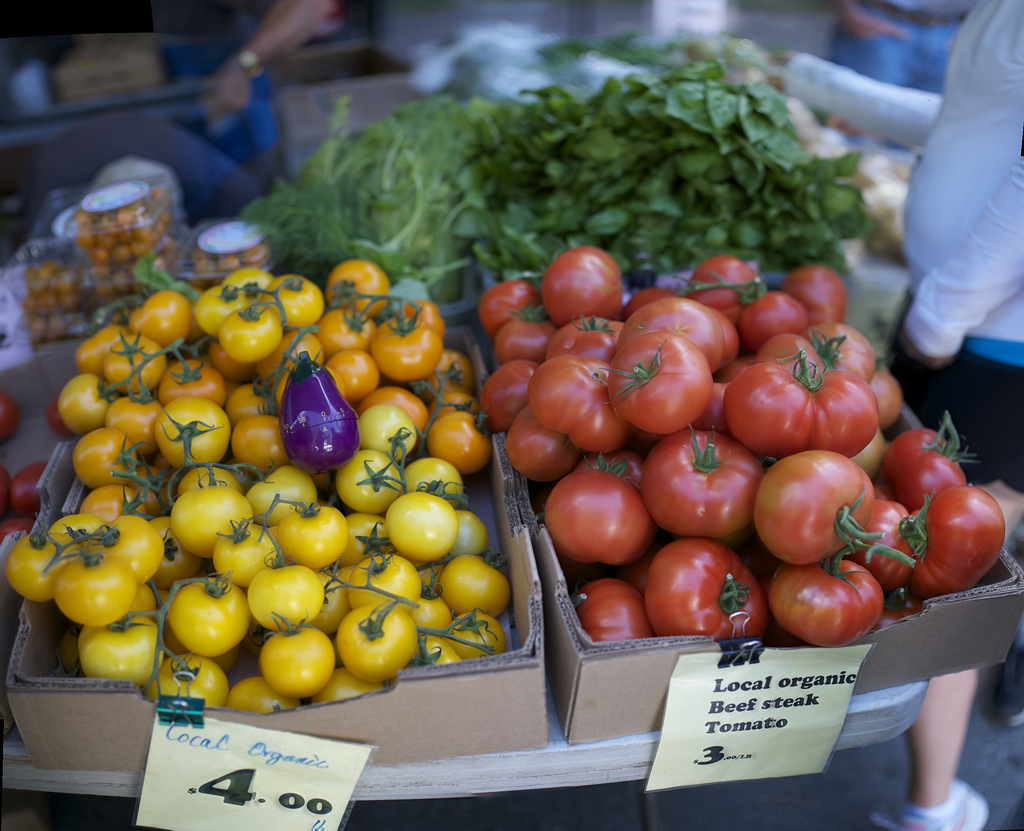

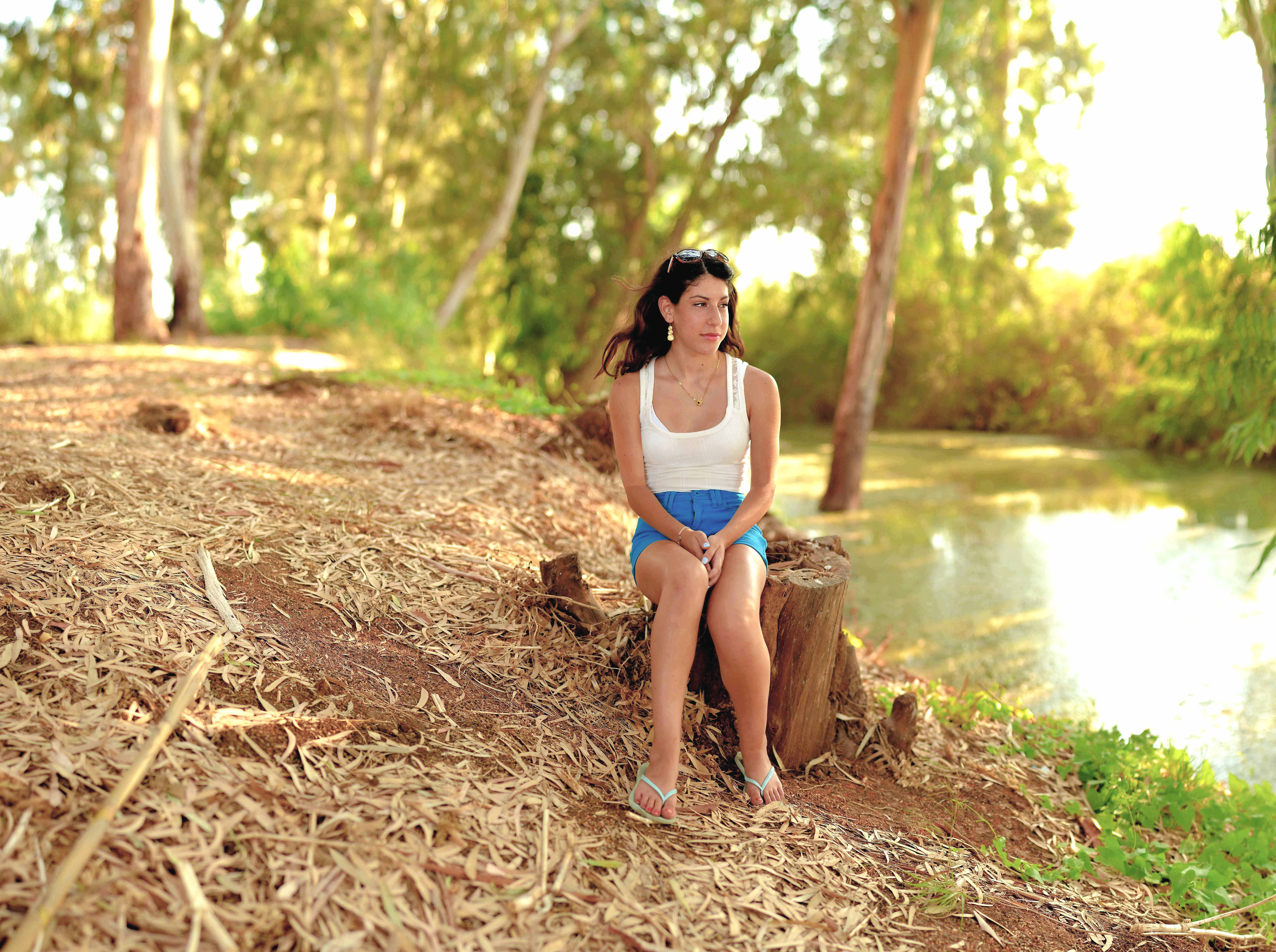

== See also ==
- Rasterbation
