= Brenizer, Pennsylvania =

Unincorporated community in Pennsylvania, US

Brenizer
- Unincorporated community
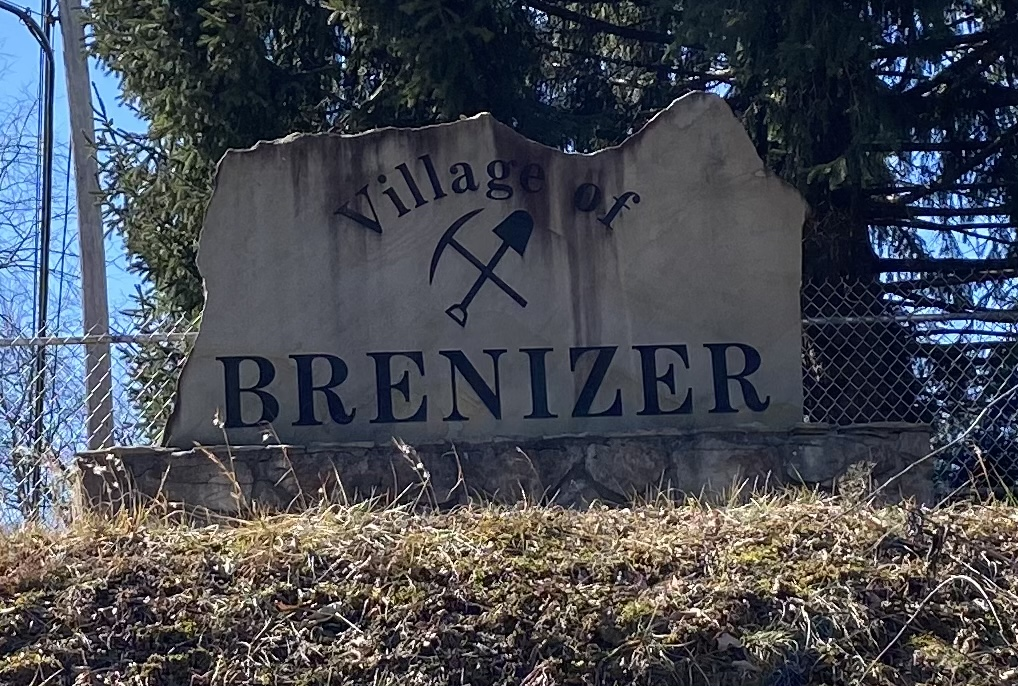

- Location within the state of Pennsylvania Brenizer (the United States)
- Coordinates: 40°24′1″N 79°16′5″W
- Country: United States
- State: Pennsylvania
- County: Westmoreland
- Elevation: 1,050 ft (320 m)
- Time zone: UTC-5 (Eastern (EST))
  - Summer (DST): UTC-4 (EDT)
- GNIS feature ID: 1170197

Brenizer, also known as Breinizer, is an unincorporated community and coal town in Derry Township, Westmoreland County, Pennsylvania, United States.

== History ==
The town was named for the Breniser family. Peter Breniser (1790–1869) is said to have established a 500-acre (200 ha) farm on the site. The two-story brick farmhouse, which is thought to date to as early as 1811, still stands on the property.

In 1906, The Latrobe Coal Company acquired the land and developed a coal mine on the property to extract coal from the Pittsburgh Seam. Company-built houses and a company store were constructed for mine employees during the period 1906 to 1933.

The earliest houses were located along Front and Poplar Streets. The original farmhouse became the mine superintendent's home. The company store, which burned in the 1970s, was on Poplar Street. Coal from the mine was transported to Gray Station in the village of Hillside and shipped to customers on the Pennsylvania Railroad. In 1920 The Westmoreland Mining Company acquired and operated the mine until it closed in 1952.

== Gallery ==
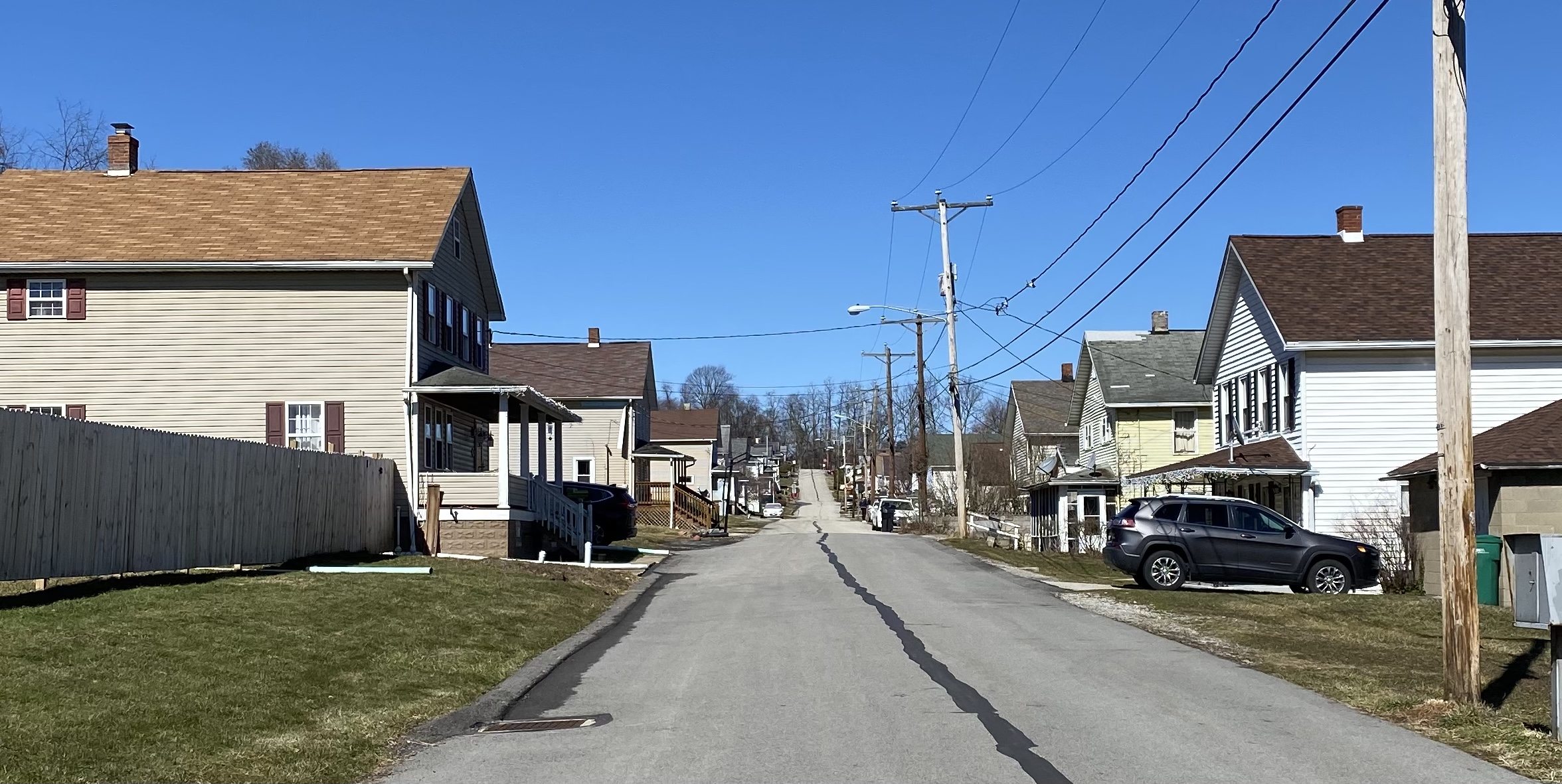
Houses on Poplar St

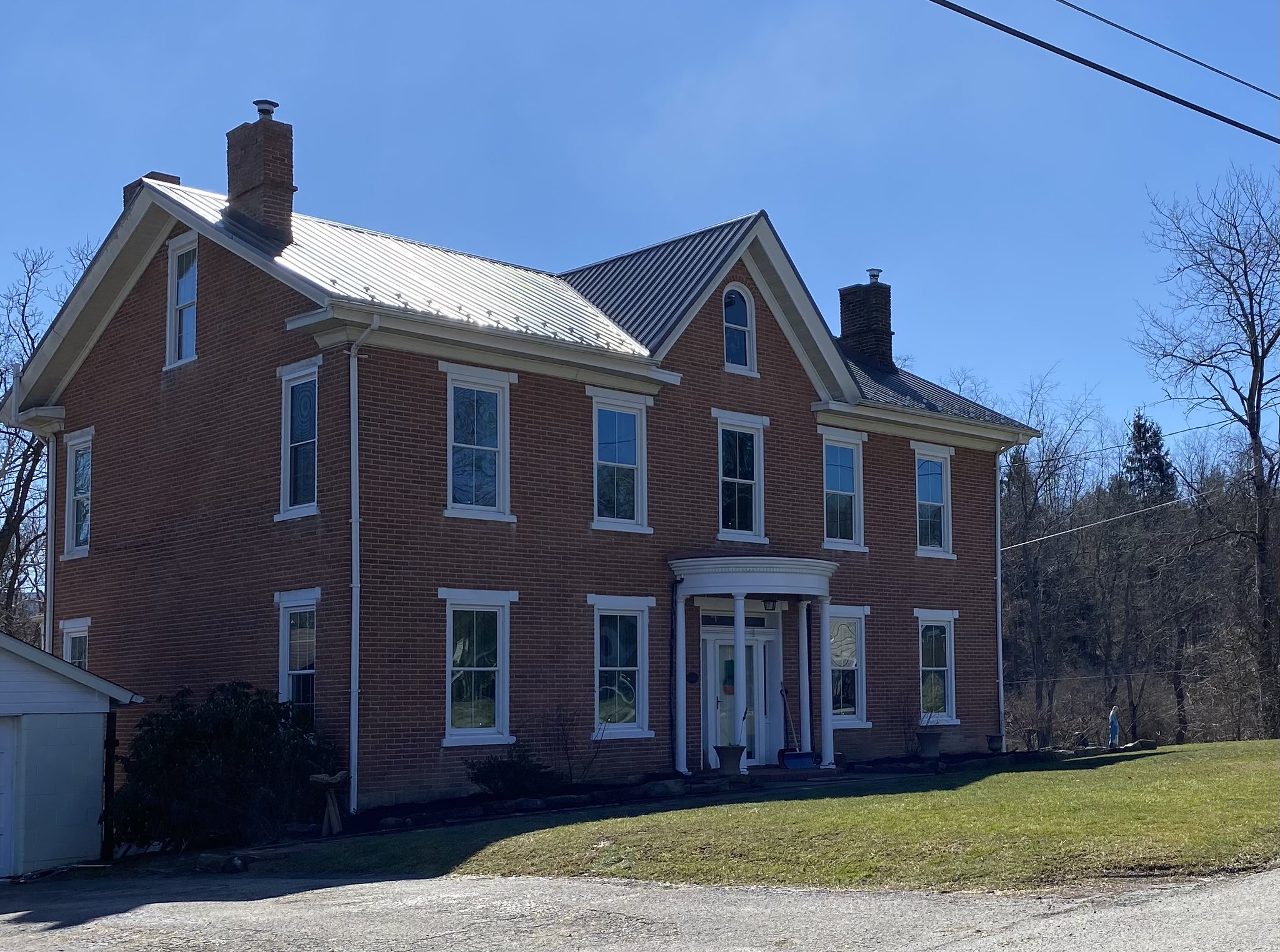
Former Brenizer farmhouse on Victory St.

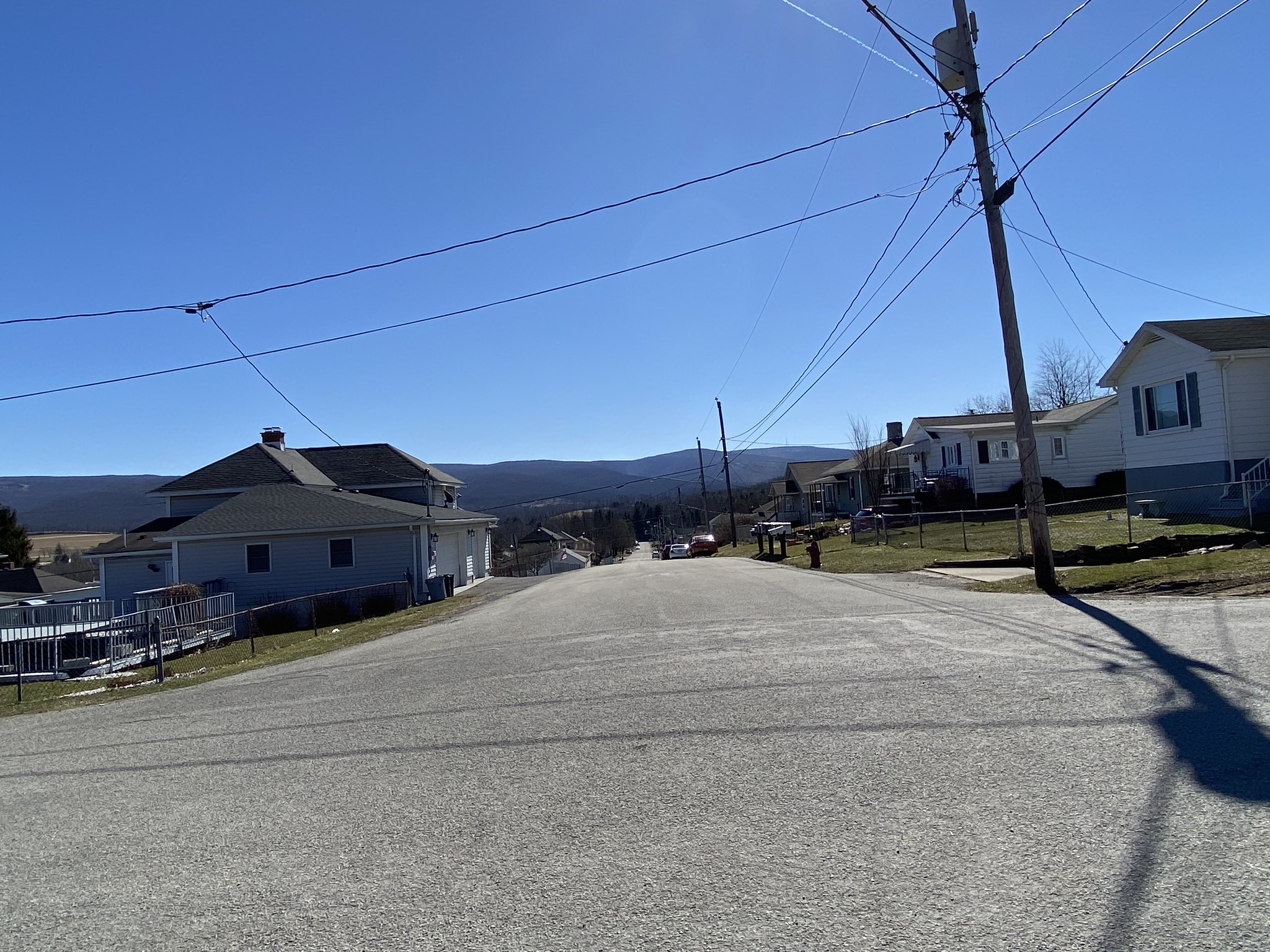
Houses on Front St., Chestnut Ridge in background
