= Custer County Courthouse (Callaway, Nebraska) =

- First Custer County Courthouse
- U.S. National Register of Historic Places
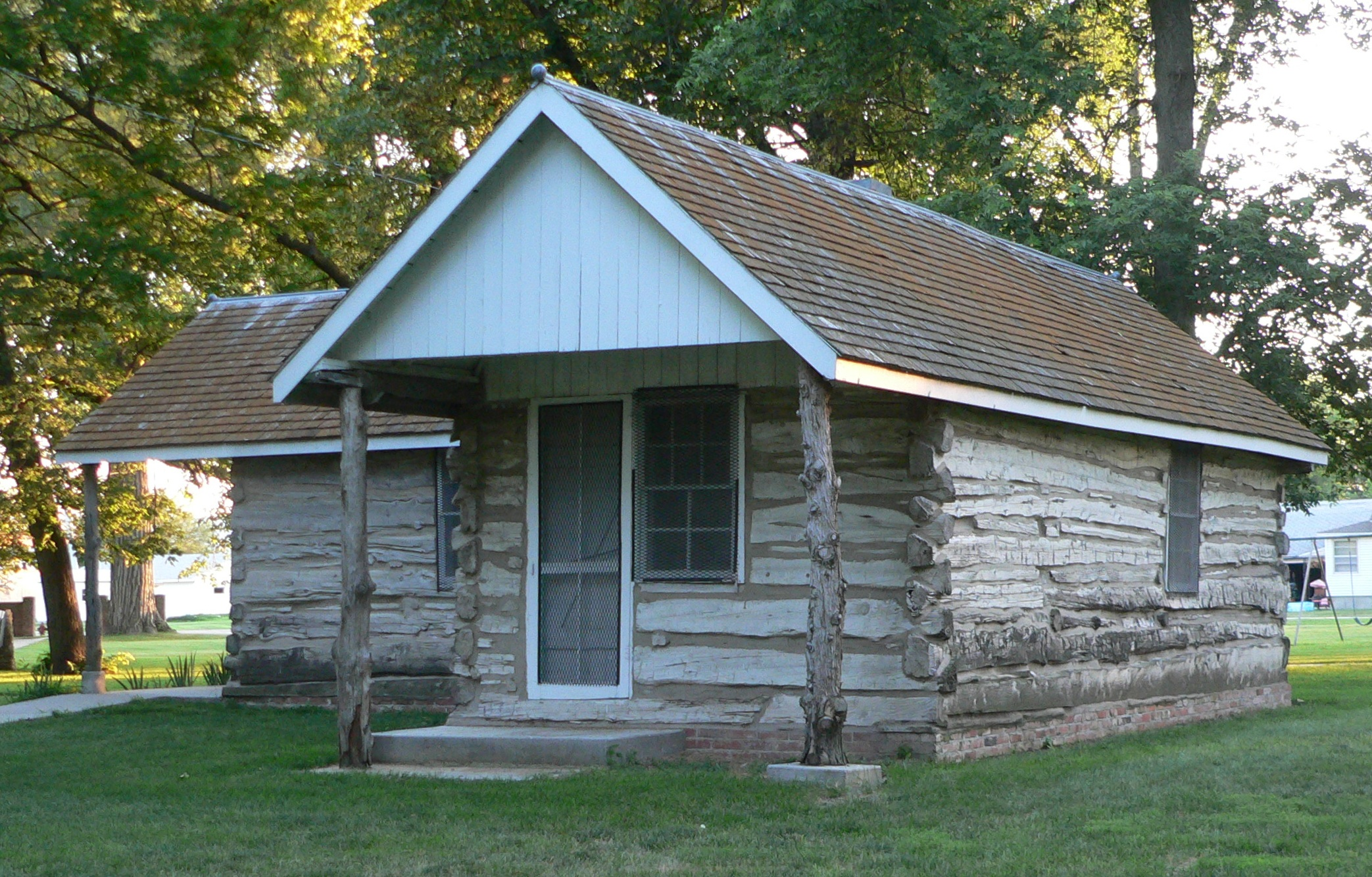

- Location within Nebraska Location within the United States
- Location: Pacific St. and Cameron Ave., Callaway, Nebraska
- Coordinates: 41°17′33″N 99°55′22″W
- Area: 2 acres (0.81 ha)
- Built: 1876
- Built by: Young, Milo
- MPS: County Courthouses of Nebraska MPS
- NRHP reference No.: 89002213
- Added to NRHP: January 10, 1990

The Custer County Courthouse in Callaway, Nebraska was listed on the National Register of Historic Places as First Custer County Courthouse in 1990.

It was built in 1876.

It was moved to its current location in 1933.

It is located at Pacific St. and Cameron Ave. in Callaway.
