= Merna, Nebraska =

- Village
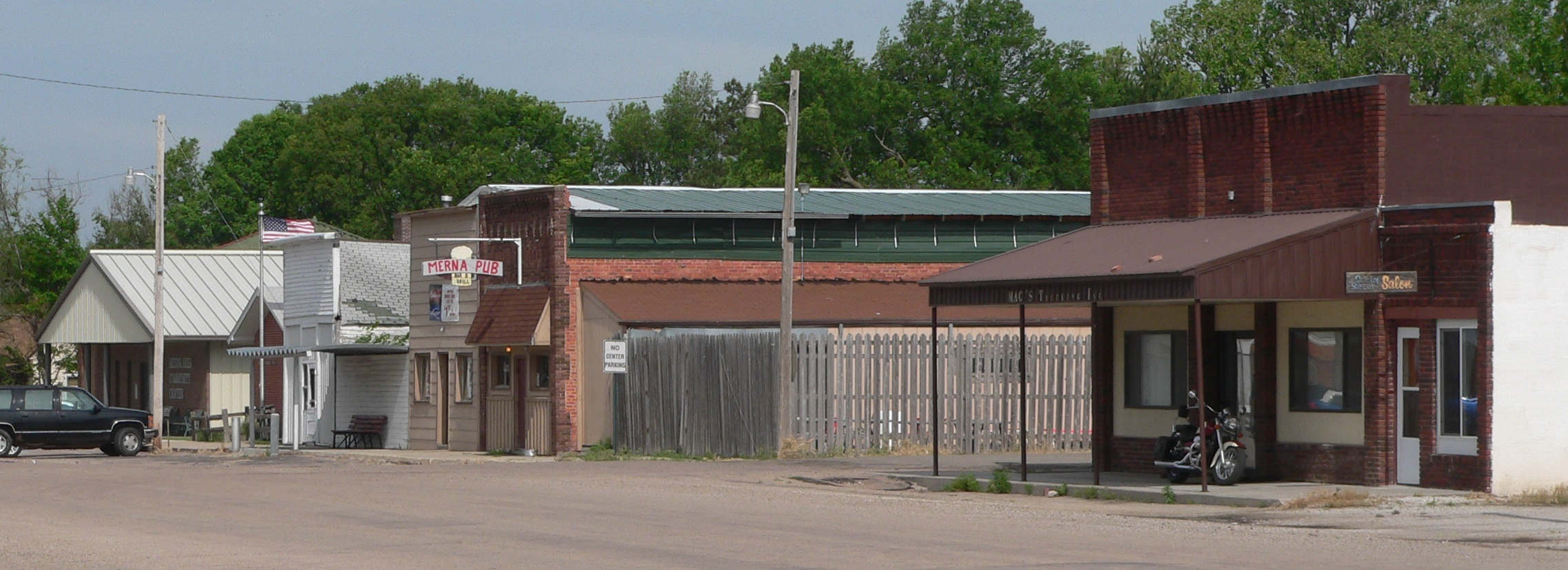
- Downtown Merna: north side of Center Avenue

- Location of Merna, Nebraska

- Location within Nebraska Location within the United States
- Coordinates: 41°29′07″N 99°45′40″W
- Country: United States
- State: Nebraska
- County: Custer
- Township: Kilfoil

Area
  - Total: 0.54 sq mi (1.39 km^{2})
  - Land: 0.54 sq mi (1.39 km^{2})
  - Water: 0 sq mi (0.00 km^{2})
- Elevation: 2,661 ft (811 m)

Population (2020)
  - Total: 343
  - Density: 640.4/sq mi (247.26/km^{2})
- Time zone: UTC-6 (Central (CST))
  - Summer (DST): UTC-5 (CDT)
- ZIP code: 68856
- Area code: 308
- FIPS code: 31-31780
- GNIS feature ID: 2399317

Merna is a village in Custer County, Nebraska, United States. As of the 2020 census, Merna had a population of 343.

== History ==
Merna was founded in the 1880s about the time the railroad was extended to that point. It was named Merna in honor of the young daughter of the first postmaster.

== Geography ==
According to the United States Census Bureau, the village has a total area of 0.54 square miles (1.40 km^{2}), all land.

Recently, Merna was at the center of a geological controversy regarding a depression in the land several miles west of town in the Loess Hills. Originally called the Bartak Depression after the owners of the land, it was redubbed the Merna Crater by University of Kansas geology professor Wakefield Dort, Jr. Further research showed the crater to be more likely formed by wind and water erosion, but memories of the flurry of importance in the small town remain.

== Demographics ==
Historical population
Census	Pop.	Note	%±
1900	141		—
1910	459		225.5%
1920	553		20.5%
1930	439		−20.6%
1940	414		−5.7%
1950	385		−7.0%
1960	349		−9.4%
1970	322		−7.7%
1980	389		20.8%
1990	377		−3.1%
2000	391		3.7%
2010	363		−7.2%
2020	343		−5.5%
U.S. Decennial Census

=== 2010 census ===
As of the census of 2010, there were 363 people, 151 households, and 110 families living in the village. The population density was 672.2 inhabitants per square mile (259.5/km^{2}). There were 174 housing units at an average density of 322.2 per square mile (124.4/km^{2}). The racial makeup of the village was 98.6% White, 0.3% from other races, and 1.1% from two or more races. Hispanic or Latino of any race were 1.4% of the population.

There were 151 households, of which 32.5% had children under the age of 18 living with them, 58.9% were married couples living together, 9.3% had a female householder with no husband present, 4.6% had a male householder with no wife present, and 27.2% were non-families. 26.5% of all households were made up of individuals, and 11.3% had someone living alone who was 65 years of age or older. The average household size was 2.40 and the average family size was 2.87.

The median age in the village was 40.2 years. 27.5% of residents were under the age of 18; 6.4% were between the ages of 18 and 24; 22.6% were from 25 to 44; 30.1% were from 45 to 64; and 13.5% were 65 years of age or older. The gender makeup of the village was 48.5% male and 51.5% female.

=== 2000 census ===
As of the census of 2000, there were 391 people, 157 households, and 116 families living in the village. The population density was 734.5 inhabitants per square mile (283.6/km^{2}). There were 176 housing units at an average density of 330.6 per square mile (127.6/km^{2}). The racial makeup of the village was 98.47% White, 0.51% African American, 0.51% Native American, 0.26% from other races, and 0.26% from two or more races. Hispanic or Latino of any race were 1.28% of the population.

There were 157 households, out of which 34.4% had children under the age of 18 living with them, 64.3% were married couples living together, 7.0% had a female householder with no husband present, and 26.1% were non-families. 24.2% of all households were made up of individuals, and 10.8% had someone living alone who was 65 years of age or older. The average household size was 2.49 and the average family size was 2.96.

In the village, the population was spread out, with 29.2% under the age of 18, 4.9% from 18 to 24, 25.8% from 25 to 44, 23.8% from 45 to 64, and 16.4% who were 65 years of age or older. The median age was 38 years. For every 100 females, there were 95.5 males. For every 100 females age 18 and over, there were 92.4 males.

As of 2000 the median income for a household in the village was $31,250, and the median income for a family was $36,406. Males had a median income of $27,083 versus $18,958 for females. The per capita income for the village was $15,474. About 10.1% of families and 13.5% of the population were below the poverty line, including 22.2% of those under age 18 and 4.2% of those age 65 or over.
