= Kienzl =

Kienzl is a surname. Notable people with the surname include:

- Fritz Kienzl (1924–?), Austrian luger
- Karla Kienzl (1922–2018), Austrian luger
- Mario Kienzl (born 1983), Austrian footballer
- Wilhelm Kienzl (1857–1941), Austrian composer

== See also ==
- Kienzle
