= Canon TS-E 50mm lens =

TS-E 50 mm f/2.8L MACRO
- Maker: Canon

Technical data
- Type: Tilt-shift lens
- Focal length: 50 mm
- Crop factor: 1.0
- Aperture (max/min): f/2.8 – f/32
- Close focus distance: 0.273 m (10.7 in)
- Max. magnification: 0.5×, up to 1.0× with Extension tube EF25 II
- Diaphragm blades: 9
- Construction: 12 elements in 9 groups

Features
- Short back focus: No No
- Ultrasonic motor: No No
- Lens-based stabilization: No No
- Macro capable: Yes Yes
- Unique features: Perspective control, Scheimpflug principle, Macro
- Application: Product, Architecture, Landscape, Portrait

Physical
- Max. length: 114.9 mm (4.52 in)
- Diameter: 86.9 mm (3.42 in)
- Weight: 945 g (33.3 oz)
- Filter diameter: 77 mm

Accessories
- Lens hood: ES-84

Angle of view
- Horizontal: 40º
- Vertical: 27º
- Diagonal: 46º

History
- Introduction: November 2017

Retail info
- MSRP: 2,199 USD

The Canon TS-E 50 mm f/2.8L MACRO is a tilt-shift prime lens that provides the equivalent of the corresponding view camera front movements on Canon EOS camera bodies. Unlike most other EF-mount lenses, it does not provide autofocus.

== Overview ==
The TS-E 50 mm f/2.8L MACRO provides four degrees of freedom, allowing ±8,5° tilt with respect to the film or sensor plane and ±12 mm shift with respect to the center of the image area; each movement can be rotated ±90° about the lens axis.

Shifting allows adjusting the position of the subject in the image area without moving the camera back; it is often used to avoid convergence of parallel lines, such as when photographing a tall building. Tilting the lens relies on the Scheimpflug principle to rotate the plane of focus away from parallel to the image plane; this can be used either to have all parts of an inclined subject sharply rendered, or to restrict sharpness to a small part of a scene. Tilting the lens results in a wedge-shaped depth of field that may be a better fit to some scenes than the depth of field between two parallel planes that results without tilt.

Unlike most view cameras, the shift mechanism allows shifts along only one axis, and the tilt mechanism allows tilts about only one axis; however, the rotation of the mechanisms allows the orientations of the axes to be changed, providing, in effect, combined tilt and swing, and combined rise/fall and lateral shift.

The TS-E 50 mm f/2.8L MACRO was the first lens from Canon which combining Macro and tilt-shift. It was announced together with a series of lenses, the TS-E 90 mm f/2.8L MACRO and the TS-E 135mm f/4L MACRO, which introduced the same features.

== See also ==
- TS-E 17 mm
- TS-E 24 mm
- TS-E 45 mm
- TS-E 90 mm
- TS-E 135 mm
