= Canon TS-E 45mm lens =

TS-E 45 mm f/2.8
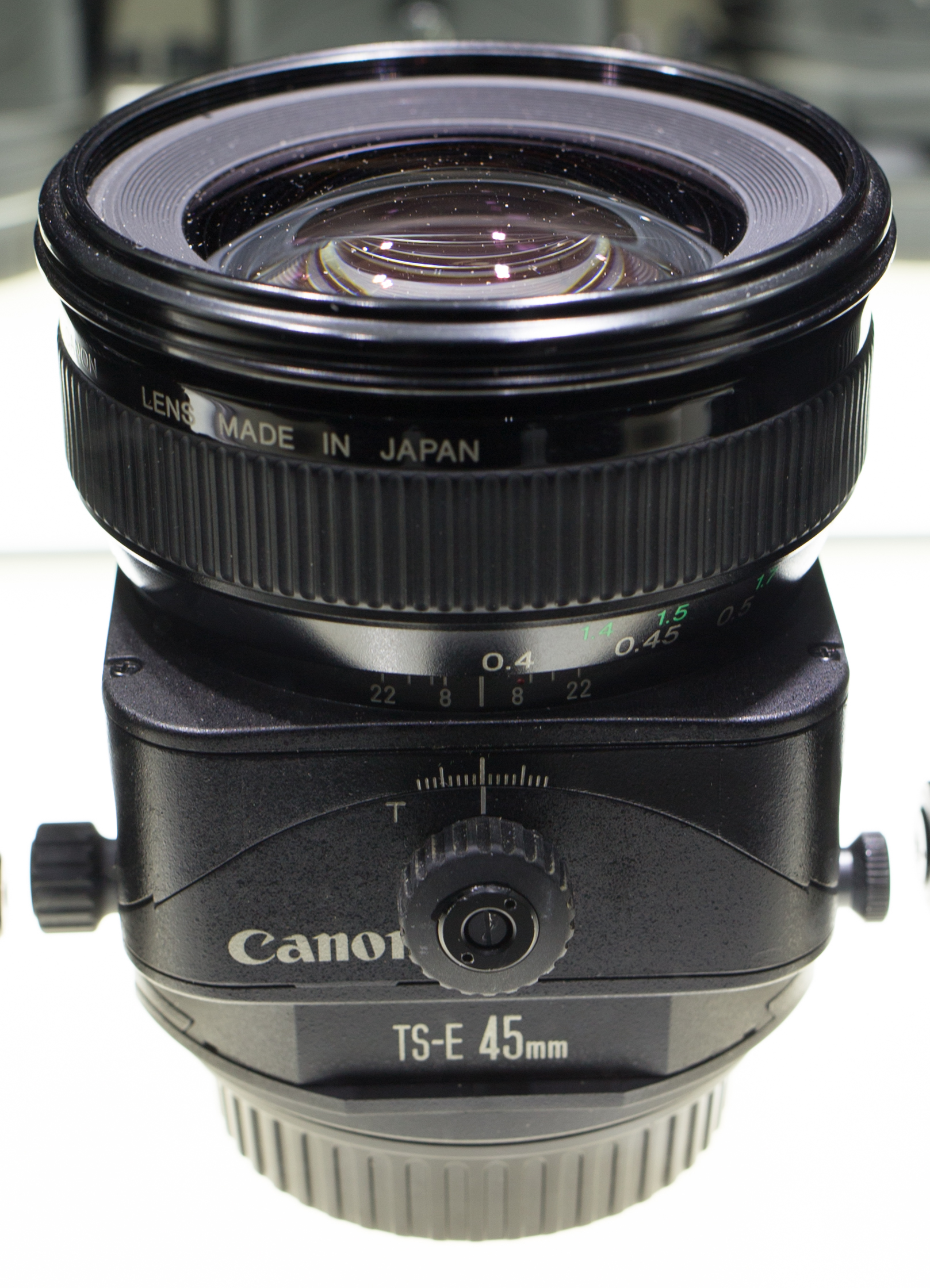
- Maker: Canon

Technical data
- Type: Tilt-shift lens
- Focal length: 45 mm
- Crop factor: 1.0
- Aperture (max/min): f/2.8 – f/22
- Close focus distance: 0.4 m
- Max. magnification: 0.16
- Diaphragm blades: 8
- Construction: 10 elements in 9 groups

Features
- Short back focus: No No
- Ultrasonic motor: No No
- Lens-based stabilization: No No
- Macro capable: No No
- Unique features: Perspective control, Scheimpflug principle
- Application: Product, Architecture, Landscape, Portrait

Physical
- Max. length: 90.1 mm
- Diameter: 81 mm
- Weight: 645 g
- Filter diameter: 72 mm

Accessories
- Lens hood: EW-79BII

Angle of view
- Horizontal: 44°
- Vertical: 30°
- Diagonal: 51°

History
- Introduction: April 1991
- Discontinuation: 2017

Retail info
- MSRP: 1100 USD

The Canon TS-E 45 mm f/2.8 is a tilt-shift, normal prime lens that provides the equivalent of the corresponding view camera front movements on Canon EOS camera bodies. Unlike most other EF-mount lenses, it does not provide autofocus.

== Overview ==
The TS-E 45 mm f/2.8 provides three degrees of freedom, allowing ±8° tilt with respect to the image plane and ±11 mm shift with respect to the center of the image area; the movements can be rotated ±90° about the lens axis, though not independently.

Shifting allows adjusting the position of the subject in the image area without moving the camera back; it is often used to avoid convergence of parallel lines, such as when photographing a tall building. Tilting the lens relies on the Scheimpflug principle to rotate the plane of focus away from parallel to the image plane; this can be used either to have all parts of an inclined subject sharply rendered, or to restrict sharpness to a small part of a scene. Tilting the lens results in a wedge-shaped depth of field that may be a better fit to some scenes than the depth of field between two parallel planes that results without tilt.

Unlike most view cameras, the shift mechanism allows shifts along only one axis, and the tilt mechanism allows tilts about only one axis; however, the rotation of the mechanisms allows the orientations of the axes to be changed, providing, in effect, combined tilt and swing, and combined rise/fall and lateral shift. The tilt and shift functions cannot be independently rotated. The lens is supplied with these functions at 90° to each other (e.g., providing tilt and lateral shift); they can be changed to work in the same directions (e.g., providing tilt and rise/fall) by removing four screws, rotating the front of the lens 90°, and reinstalling the screws.

== See also ==
- TS-E 17 mm
- TS-E 24 mm
- TS-E 50 mm
- TS-E 90 mm
- TS-E 135mm
