= Canon TS-E 90mm lens =

The Canon TS-E 90 mm f/2.8 is a tilt-shift, telephoto prime lens that provides the equivalent of the corresponding view camera front movements on Canon EOS camera bodies. Unlike most other EF-mount lenses, it does not provide autofocus.

== Overview ==
The TS-E 90 mm f/2.8 provides three degrees of freedom, allowing ±8° tilt with respect to the image plane and ±11 mm shift with respect to the center of the image area; the movements can be rotated ±90° about the lens axis, though not independently.

Shifting allows adjusting the position of the subject in the image area without moving the camera back; it is often used to avoid convergence of parallel lines, such as when photographing a tall building. Tilting the lens relies on the Scheimpflug principle to rotate the plane of focus away from parallel to the image plane; this can be used either to have all parts of an inclined subject sharply rendered, or to restrict sharpness to a small part of a scene. Tilting the lens results in a wedge-shaped depth of field that may be a better fit to some scenes than the depth of field between two parallel planes that results without tilt.

Unlike most view cameras, the shift mechanism allows shifts along only one axis, and the tilt mechanism allows tilts about only one axis; however, the rotation of the mechanisms allows the orientations of the axes to be changed, providing, in effect, combined tilt and swing, and combined rise/fall and lateral shift. The tilt and shift functions cannot be independently rotated. The lens is supplied with these functions at 90° to each other (e.g., providing tilt and lateral shift); they can be changed to work in the same directions (e.g., providing tilt and rise/fall) by removing four screws, rotating the front of the lens 90°, and reinstalling the screws.

== TS-E 90mm f/2.8L MACRO ==
On August 29, 2017, Canon announced the TS-E 90mm f/2.8L MACRO, the fellowship of the TS-E 90 mm f/2.8. Main difference compare to the TS-E 90 mm f/2.8 is the Macro capability and the change to the L line. Macro photography is possible up to 0.5× magnification with lens only and up to 0.82× with Extension Tube EF 25 II. The closest focus distance has decreased from 0.5 metres (1.6 ft) to 0.39 metres (1.3 ft). The new lens allows tilt up to ±10° and shift up to ±12 mm.

== Specifications ==
Attribute	TS-E 90 mm f/2.8	TS-E 90 mm f/2.8L MACRO
Image		
Key features
feat-special	Perspective control, Scheimpflug principle	
application	Product, Macro, Portrait	
Autofocus capable	No No	
Full-frame compatible	Yes Yes	
Image stabilizer	No No	
Ultrasonic Motor	No No	
Stepping Motor	No No	
L-series	No No	Yes Yes
Macro	No No	Yes Yes
Technical data
Focal length	90 mm	
type	Tilt-shift lens	
Aperture (max/min)	f/2.8 – f/32	f/2.8 – f/45
Construction	6 elements / 5 groups	11 elements / 9 groups
# of diaphragm blades	8	9
Closest focusing distance	0.5 m (1.6 ft)	0.39 m (1.3 ft)
Max. magnification	0.29×	0.5×, 0.82× with EF 25 II
Horizontal viewing angle	22.6° (without any tilt or shift)	
Vertical viewing angle	15.2° (without any tilt or shift)	
Diagonal viewing angle	27° (without any tilt or shift)	
Physical data
Weight	645 g (22.8 oz)	915 g (32.3 oz)
Maximum diameter	73.6 mm (2.90 in)	86.9 mm (3.42 in)
Length	88 mm (3.5 in)	116.5 mm (4.59 in)
Filter diameter	58 mm	77 mm
Accessories
Lens case	LP1016	LP1219
Lens hood	ES-65III	ES-84
Lens cap	E-58 / E-58II	E-77 II
Retail information
Release date	April 1991	August 2017
Currently in production?	No No	Yes Yes
MSRP US$	1,100	2,199

== See also ==
- TS-E 17 mm
- TS-E 24 mm
- TS-E 45 mm
- TS-E 50 mm
- TS-E 135 mm
