= Scheimpflug =

Scheimpflug may refer to:

- Scheimpflug principle
- Lotte Scheimpflug, luger
- Theodor Scheimpflug, Austrian photographer
