= Canon TS-E 24mm lens =

Tilt-shift, wide-angle prime lens made by Canon

The Canon TS-E 24 mm f/3.5L II is a tilt-shift, wide-angle prime lens that provides the equivalent of the corresponding view camera front movements on Canon EOS camera bodies. Though it uses Canon's EF lens mount, it does not provide autofocus.

== Overview ==
The TS-E 24 mm f/3.5L II lens provides four degrees of freedom, allowing ±8.5° tilt with respect to the film or sensor plane and ±12 mm shift with respect to the center of the image area; each movement can be rotated ±90° about the lens axis.

Shifting allows adjusting the position of the subject in the image area without changing the camera angle; it is often used to avoid convergence of parallel lines, such as when photographing a tall building. Tilting the lens relies on the Scheimpflug principle to rotate the plane of focus away from parallel to the image plane; this can be used either to have all parts of an inclined subject sharply rendered, or to restrict sharpness to a small part of a scene. Tilting the lens results in a wedge-shaped depth of field that may be a better fit to some scenes than the depth of field between two parallel planes that results without tilt.

Unlike most view cameras, the shift mechanism allows shifts along only one axis, and the tilt mechanism allows tilts about only one axis; however, the rotation of the mechanisms allows the orientations of the axes to be changed, providing, in effect, combined tilt and swing, and combined rise/fall and lateral shift. In addition to optical improvements, the TS-E 24 mm f/3.5L II also introduces a new barrel design, allowing the tilt and the shift to be rotated independently of each other without removing screws on the lens body, as was required on the original version.

Canon announced the second version of this lens on the 18 February 2009. The lens has been in production since June 2009; it replaces the TS-E 24mm f/3.5L that was introduced in 1991.

== Specifications ==
| Attribute | TS-E24mm f/3.5L | TS-E24mm f/3.5L II |
|---|---|---|
| Image | | |
Key features
| feat-special | Perspective control, Scheimpflug principle | |
| application | landscape, architecture | |
| Autofocus capable | No No | |
| Full-frame compatible | Yes Yes | |
| Image stabilizer | No No | |
| Ultrasonic Motor | No No | |
| Stepping Motor | No No | |
| L-series | Yes Yes | |
| Macro | No No | |
Technical data
| Focal length | 24 mm | |
| type | Tilt-shift lens | |
| Aperture (max/min) | f/3.5 / f/22 | |
| Construction | 11 elements / 9 groups | 16 elements / 11 groups |
| # of diaphragm blades | 8 | |
| Closest focusing distance | 0.3 m (0.98 ft) | 0.21 m (0.69 ft) |
| Max. magnification | 0.14 × | 0.34 × |
| Horizontal viewing angle | 74° (without any tilt or shift) | |
| Vertical viewing angle | 53° (without any tilt or shift) | |
| Diagonal viewing angle | 84° (without any tilt or shift) | |
Physical data
| Weight | 570 g (20 oz) | 780 g (27.5 oz) |
| Maximum diameter | 78 mm (3.1 in) | 88,5 mm (3.5 in) |
| Length | 86.8 mm (3.42 in) | 106,9 mm (4.2 in) |
| Filter diameter | 72 mm | 82 mm |
Accessories
| Lens case | LP1216 | LP1319 |
| Lens hood | EW-75BII | EW-88B |
| Lens cap | E-72 | E-82 / E-82II |
Retail information
| Release date | April 1991 | June 2009 |
| Currently in production? | No No | Yes Yes |
| MSRP | 173,000 yen (w/case and hood) | 250,000 yen / US$2,199 (w/case and hood) |

== See also ==
- Canon TS-E 17mm lens
- Canon TS-E 45mm lens
- Canon TS-E 50mm lens
- Canon TS-E 90mm lens
- Canon TS-E 135mm lens
- PC-E Nikkor 24mm f/3.5D ED Lens – Equivalent Nikon lens
