= Nikon PC-E Nikkor 24mm f/3.5D ED =

Nikkor 24mm f/3.5 ED Lens
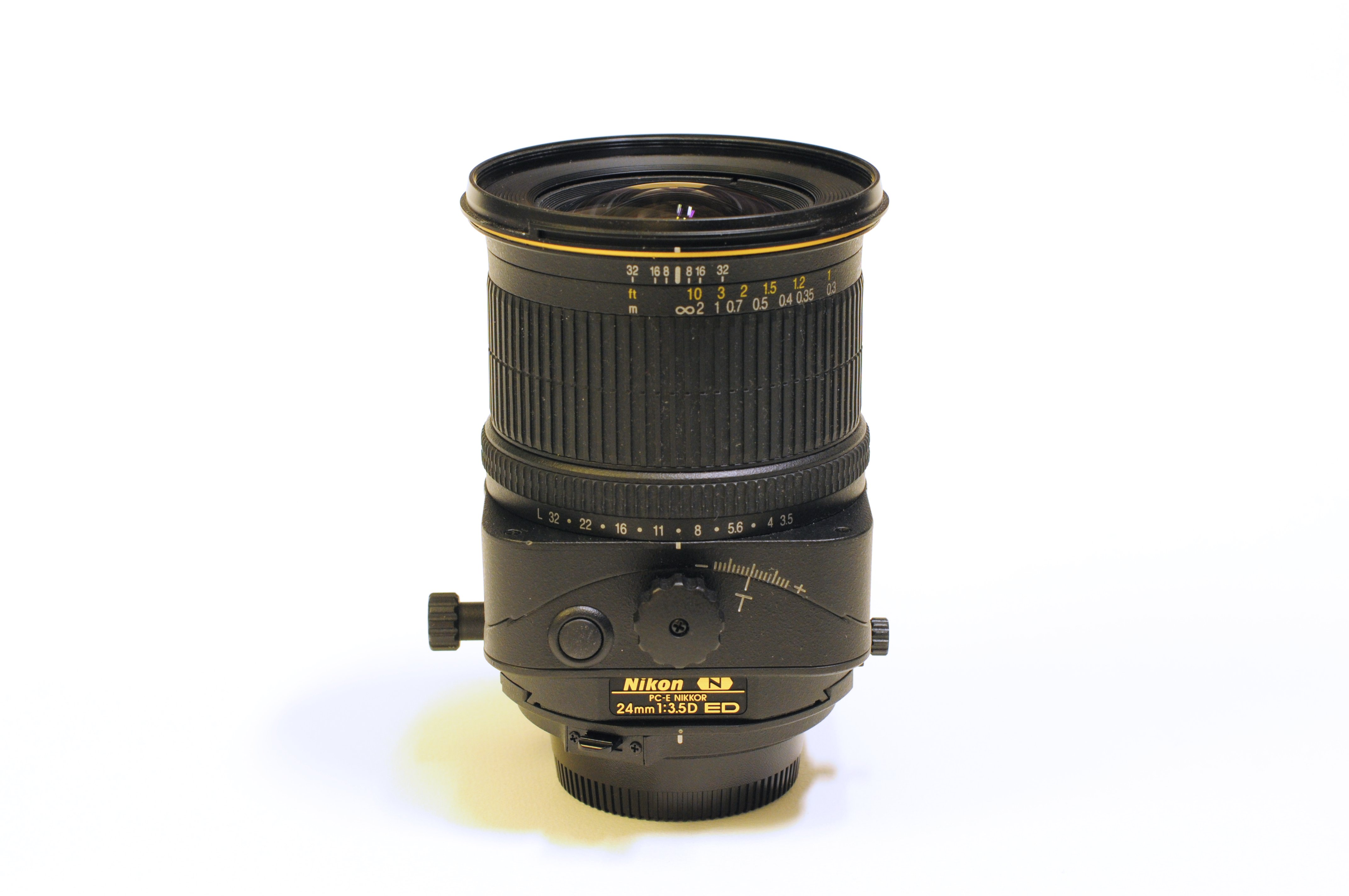
- Maker: Nikon Corporation
- Lens mount: F-mount

Technical data
- Type: Tilt-shift lens (max. 11mm shift)
- Focus drive: No No
- Focal length: 24mm
- Image format: FX (full-frame)
- Aperture (max/min): f/3.5 – f/32
- Close focus distance: 0.21 m (8.3 in)
- Diaphragm blades: 9
- Construction: 13 elements in 10 groups

Features
- Lens-based stabilization: No No
- Aperture ring: Yes Yes
- Unique features: Perspective control
- Application: architecture, commercial, landscape

Physical
- Max. length: 108 mm (4.3 in)
- Diameter: 82.5 mm (3.25 in)
- Weight: 730 g (1.61 lb)
- Filter diameter: 77mm

Angle of view
- Diagonal: 84° (without any tilt or shift)

History
- Introduction: 2008

Retail info
- MSRP: 2,199.95 USD

The Nikon PC-E Nikkor 24mm f/3.5D ED Lens is a tilt-shift, wide-angle prime lens that provides the equivalent of the corresponding view camera front movements on Nikon F-mount camera bodies. Its ultra-wide perspective control features tilt, shift and rotation capability, well-suited for architectural and nature photography.

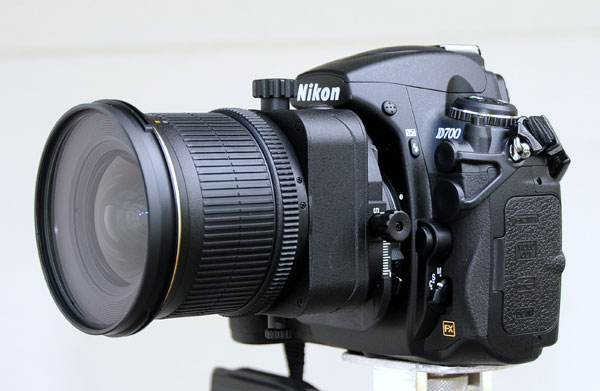
24mm Nikkor PC-E lens

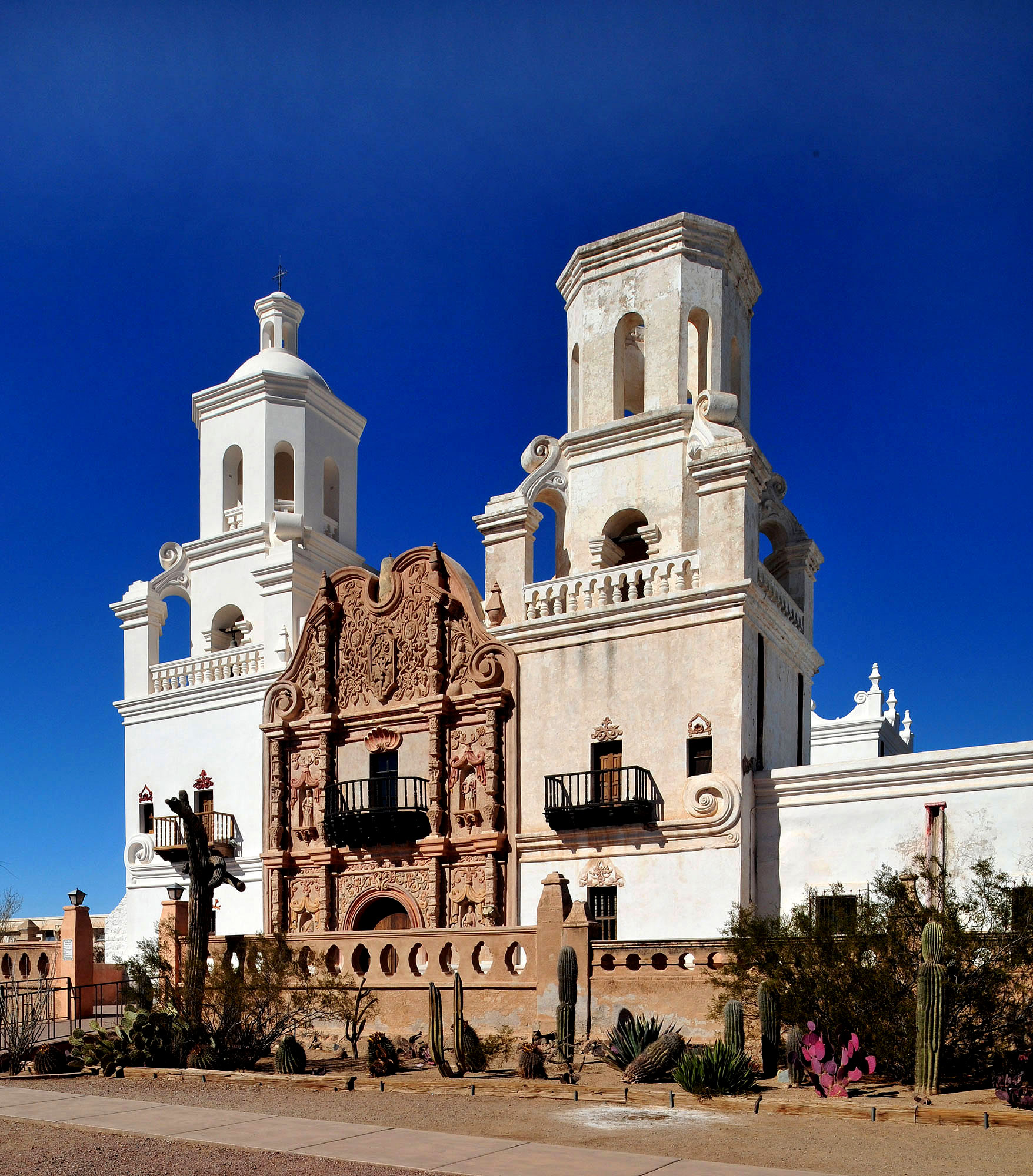
Mission San Xavier del Bac, south of Tucson, Arizona. Photographer: Jeffrey M. Dean, Tucson. Taken with this lens.

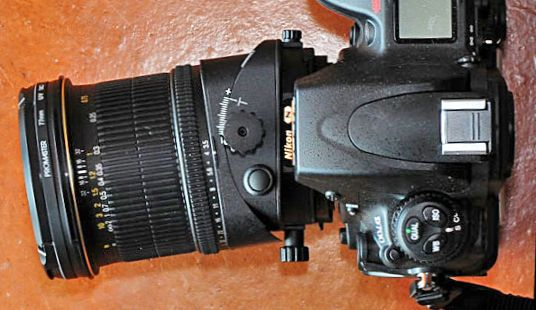
The 24mm PC-E lens shown in its tilt mode

The lens is designed for Nikon's full frame (FX) cameras, such as the Nikon D610, Nikon D750, Nikon D810, Nikon D700, Nikon D800, Nikon D600, Nikon D3, Nikon D4, and Nikon D5, for which it provides an 84° angle of view. It can be used with Nikon DX format cameras with the angle of view reduced to 61° (equivalent to a 36mm lens). The lens allows an 8.5° tilt with respect to the film or sensor plane and 11mm shift with respect to the center of the image area. Each movement can be rotated ±90° about the lens axis.

This lens features automatic aperture control. When it is mounted on a compatible Nikon camera, the user can use all exposure modes to take photographs without operating the aperture stop-down button. Previous Nikkor PC lenses cannot do this.

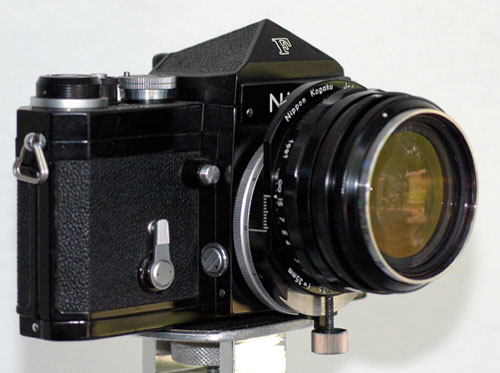
Nikon’s 1962 f/3.5 35mm PC Nikkor lens -- the world's first PC lens in the 35mm format -- on a Nikon F body

On October 19, 2016, Nikon introduced a wider-angle shift-tilt lens, the 19mm f/4 Nikkor PC-E ED Lens. With similar features to the 24mm earlier lens, it has a bulbous protruding lens element needed to reach the 19mm angle.

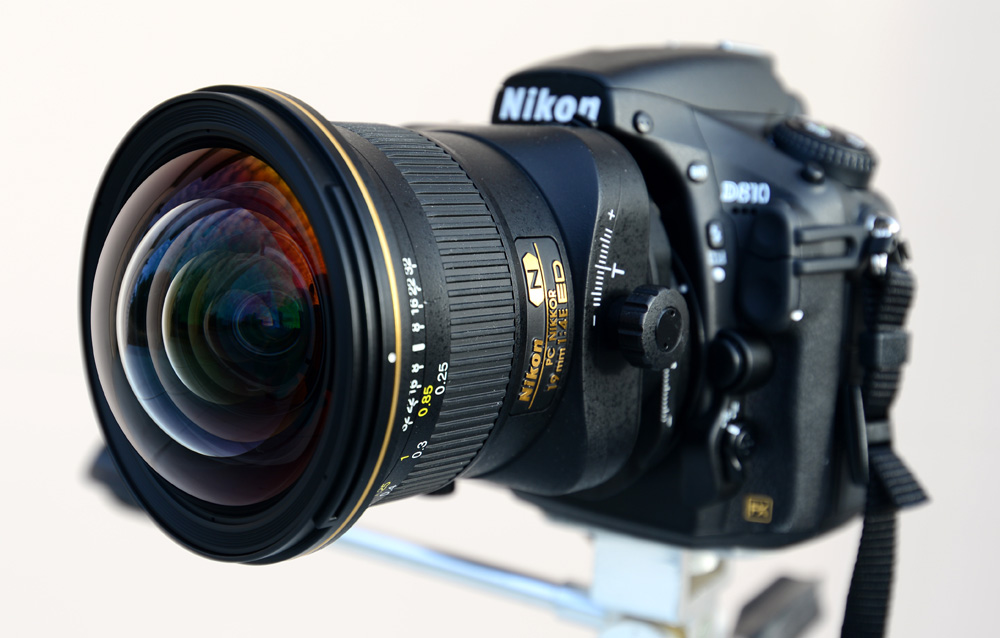
Nikon 19mm f/4 Nikkor PC-E ED tilt-shift lens, introduced October 2016, and mounted on a Nikon D810 camera.

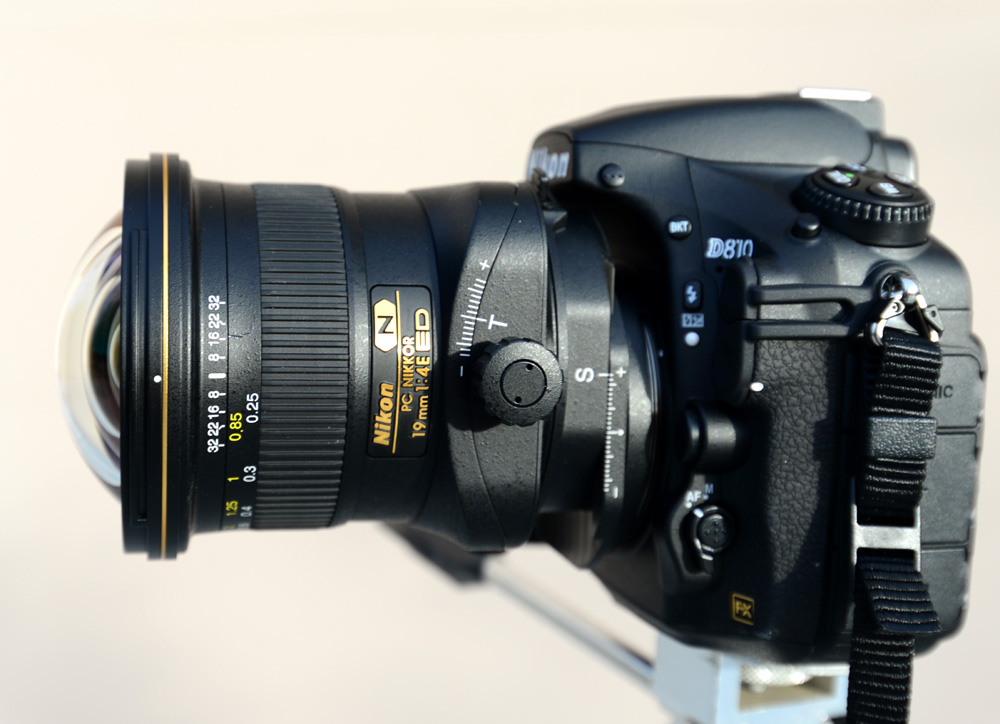
Nikon 19mm f/4 Nikkor PC-E ED tilt-shift lens, shown shifted 12mm.

== See also ==
- Canon TS-E 24mm lens
- Perspective control
- Perspective control lens
- Nikon F-mount#Perspective control (PC) lenses
