= Leimgruber =

Leimgruber is a surname. Notable people with the surname include:

- Darcia Leimgruber (born 1989), Swiss ice hockey player
- Oskar Leimgruber (1886–1976), Swiss Politician
- Urs Leimgruber (born 1952), Swiss saxophonist
- Werner Leimgruber (1934–2025), Swiss footballer
- Wilhelm Leimgruber, Austrian luger

== See also ==
- Leimgruber–Batcho indole synthesis, series of organic reactions
