= Perspective correction =

Perspective correction may refer to:

- Perspective control, acquiring photographs with less perspective distortion, or editing photographs to counteract it
- Perspective correction in texture mapping

== See also ==
- Distortion (optics)
