= FIL European Luge Championships 1954 =

The FIL European Luge Championships 1954 took place in Davos, Switzerland under the auspices of the Fédération Internationale de Bobsleigh et de Tobogganing (FIBT - International Bobsleigh and Tobogganing Federation in (in French)) under their "Section de Luge", a trend that would continue until the International Luge Federation (FIL) was formed in 1957. An American delegation participated in this event, giving way to the creation of the first World luge championships that would be organized the following year in Oslo, Norway.

== Men's singles ==
Medal	Athlete	Time
Gold	Fritz Kienzl (AUT)	
Silver	Wilhelm Lache (AUT)	
Bronze	Josef Strillinger (FRG)	

== Women's singles ==
Medal	Athlete	Time
Gold	Maria Isser (AUT)	
Silver	Karla Kienzl (AUT)	
Bronze	Lotte Scheimpflug (ITA)	

Scheimpflug was the first Italian woman to medal at the championships.

== Doubles ==
Medal	Athlete	Time
Gold	Austria (Josef Isser, Maria Isser)	
Silver	Austria (Ernst Feistmantl, Richard Feistmantl)	
Bronze	Austria (Hans Krausner, Josef Leistentritt)	

== Medal table ==
Rank	Nation	Gold	Silver	Bronze	Total
1	Austria (AUT)	3	3	1	7
2	Italy (ITA)	0	0	1	1
2	West Germany (FRG)	0	0	1	1
Totals (3 entries)		3	3	3	9
