= Helga Müller =

German luger

Medal record

Luge

World Championships
Silver medal – second place	1957 Davos	Women's singles

Helga Müller was a West German luger who competed during the 1950s. She won the silver medal in the women's singles event at the 1957 FIL World Luge Championships in Davos, Switzerland.
