= Brigitte Fink =

Italian luger (1940–2024)

Medal record

Luge

World Championships
Bronze medal – third place	1957 Davos	Women's singles

Brigitte Fink (29 April 1940 – 17 October 2024) was an Italian luger who competed during the 1950s. She won the bronze medal in the women's singles event at the 1957 FIL World Luge Championships in Davos, Switzerland. Fink died on 17 October 2024, at the age of 84.

== Sources ==
- Hickok sports information on World champions in luge and skeleton.
