= Errich Raffl =

Austrian luger

Medal record

Luge

World Championships
Bronze medal – third place	1957 Davos	Men's singles
Bronze medal – third place	1957 Davos	Men's doubles

European Championships
Silver medal – second place	1956 Imst	Men's doubles
Bronze medal – third place	1953 Cortina d'Ampezzo	Men's doubles
Bronze medal – third place	1956 Imst	Men's singles

Errich Raffl (sometimes shown as Erich Raffl) is an Austrian luger who competed in the 1950s. At the 1957 FIL World Luge Championships in Davos, Switzerland, he won bronze medals both in the men's singles and men's doubles event.

Raffl also won three medals at the European luge championships with one silver (Men's doubles: 1956) and two bronzes (Men's singles: 1956, Men's doubles: 1953).
