= Hans Schaller =

German luger

Medal record

Luge

World Championships
Gold medal – first place	1957 Davos	Men's singles

Hans Schaller is a West German luger who competed in the 1950s. He won the gold medal in the men's singles event at the 1957 FIL World Luge Championships in Davos, Switzerland.
