= Giorgio Pichler =

Italian luger

Medal record

Luge

World Championships
| Silver medal – second place | 1957 Davos | Doubles |

Giorgio Pichler was an Italian luger who competed during the 1950s and early 1960s. He won the gold medal in the doubles event at the 1961 FIL World Luge Championships in Girenbad, Switzerland, and the silver medal in the same discipline at the 1957 FIL World Luge Championships in Davos, Switzerland.
