= Luis Posch =

Austrian luger

Medal record

Luge

European Championships
Bronze medal – third place	1956 Imst	Men's doubles

Luis Posch is an Austrian luger who competed in the 1950s. He won a bronze medal in the men's doubles event at the 1956 European luge championships in Imst, Austria.
