= FIL European Luge Championships 1956 =

The FIL European Luge Championships 1956 took place in Imst, Austria under the auspices of the Fédération Internationale de Bobsleigh et de Tobogganing (FIBT - International Bobsleigh and Tobogganing Federation in (in French)) under their "Section de Luge". It would be the last championship under the FIBT until the formation of the International Luge Federation (FIL) the following year.

== Men's singles ==
Medal	Athlete	Time
Gold	Josef Isser (AUT)	
Silver	Hans Krausner (AUT)	
Bronze	Erich Raffl (AUT)	

== Women's singles ==
Medal	Athlete	Time
Gold	Elly Lieber (AUT)	
Silver	Maria Isser (AUT)	
Bronze	Lotte Scheimpflug (ITA)	

Lieber ends Isser's European championship reign at this event.

== Men's doubles ==
Medal	Athlete	Time
Gold	Austria (Wilhelm Leimgruber, Josef Unterfrauner)	
Silver	Austria (Erich Raffl, Stefan Schöpf)	
Bronze	Austria (Josef Thaler, Luis Posch)	

== Medal table ==
Rank	Nation	Gold	Silver	Bronze	Total
1	Austria (AUT)	3	3	2	8
2	Italy (ITA)	0	0	1	1
Totals (2 entries)		3	3	3	9
