= FIL World Luge Championships 1957 =

The FIL World Luge Championships 1957 took place in Davos, Switzerland. It marked the first time the event was held under the auspices of the International Luge Federation (FIL) which was formed earlier that year. Also, it was the first time the championships had been held after being cancelled the previous year.

== Men's singles ==
Medal	Athlete	Time
Gold	Hans Schaller (GER)	
Silver	Bibi Torriani (SUI)	
Bronze	Erich Raffl (AUT)	

== Women's singles ==
Medal	Athlete	Time
Gold	Maria Isser (AUT)	
Silver	Helga Müller (GER)	
Bronze	Brigitte Fink (ITA)	

== Men's doubles ==
Medal	Athlete	Time
Gold	West Germany (Josef Strillinger, Fritz Nachmann)	
Silver	Italy (Giorgio Pichler, Hubert Ebner)	
Bronze	Austria (Erich Raffl, Ewald Walch)	

== Medal table ==
Rank	Nation	Gold	Silver	Bronze	Total
1	West Germany (FRG)	2	1	0	3
2	Austria (AUT)	1	0	2	3
3	Italy (ITA)	0	1	1	2
4	Switzerland (SUI)	0	1	0	1
Totals (4 entries)		3	3	3	9
