= Josef Leistentritt =

Austrian luger

Medal record

Luge

European Championships
Bronze medal – third place	1954 Davos	Men's doubles

Josef Leisentritt was an Austrian luger who competed in the mid-1950s. He won a bronze medal in the men's doubles event at the 1954 European luge championships in Davos, Switzerland.
