= Josef Strillinger =

German luger

Medal record

Luge

World Championships
Gold medal – first place	1957 Davos	Men's doubles
Gold medal – first place	1958 Krynica	Men's doubles
Bronze medal – third place	1955 Oslo	Men's doubles

European Championships
Bronze medal – third place	1954 Davos	Men's singles

Josef Strillinger was a West German luger who competed during the 1950s. He won three medals in the men's doubles event at the FIL World Luge Championships with two golds (1957, 1958) and one bronze (1955).

Strillinger also won a bronze medal in the men's singles event at the 1954 European luge championships in Davos, Switzerland.
