= Fritz Kienzl =

Austrian luger

Medal record

Luge

European Championships
Gold medal – first place	1954 Davos	Men's singles

Fritz Kienzl (born 1924) was an Austrian luger who competed during the 1950s. He won a gold medal in the men's singles event at the 1954 European luge championships in Davos, Switzerland. His wife Karla Kienzl won silver at this event.
