= Freelensing =

Photography technique using detached lens for creativity

Freelensing is a photography technique used with interchangeable lens cameras in both film-based and digital photography. The lens is detached from the camera and held in front of the lens mount by hand during exposure. This allows the lens to be tilted or shifted creating a similar effect to a perspective control or "Tilt-Shift" lens, only with a lower degree of fidelity. The result is a combination of selective focus and light leakage which are used creatively to create surreal imagery. Because of the increase in flange focal distance, this technique is most successful with closeup or macro photography, where infinity focus is not essential.

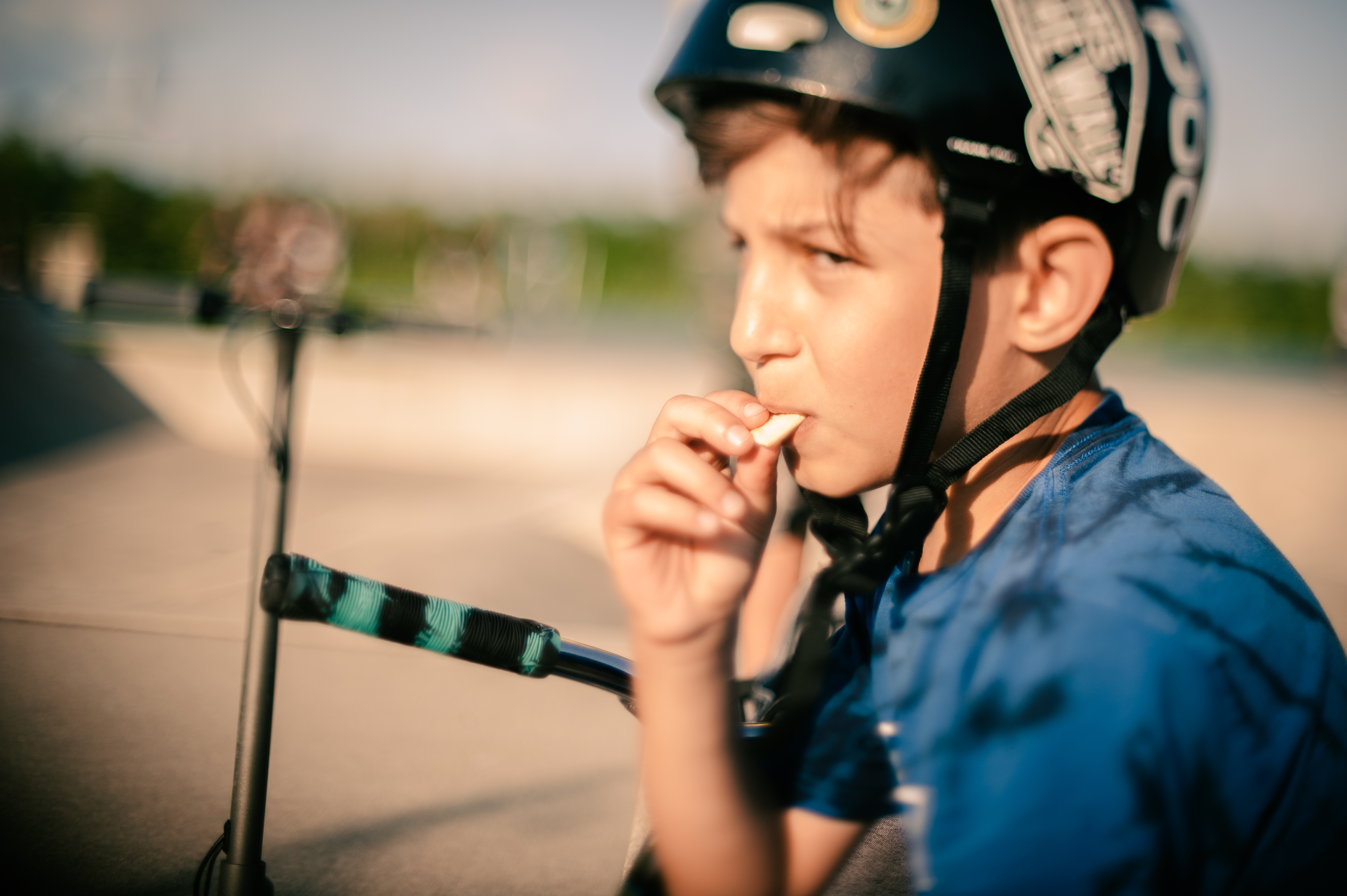
A freelensed photo

The lens used does not necessarily have to be native to the brand of camera, since it is not physically attached to it. In addition, the lens may also be reversed for macro photography. By shooting through a normal to wide-angle lens backwards, increased magnification can be achieved. One of the by-products of freelensing is the introduction of "light leaks" which can be controlled to some degree and produce toy-camera like effects similar to those achieved with a Holga or Diana camera.

The process is facilitated by use of an SLR, DSLR or MILC, in which the focus, and to a lesser degree the composition of the image, can be previewed prior to capture. In the case of a rangefinder or similar non-reflex or non live-view camera, the resulting focus would be unpredictable enough to be impractical, and yet not impossible to achieve.

Freelensing is best accomplished in a relatively dry, dust-free environment due to exposure of the mirror box, and the dust-attracting sensor, to the elements. Once the photos have been captured, the lens should be remounted or a body cap installed to protect the mirror and sensor from dust or moisture. Frequent use of a bulb blower or electronic cleaning is recommended. Sensor cleaning requires special care so as to not damage components.
