= Wilhelm Leimgruber =

Austrian luger

Medal record

Luge

European Championships
Gold medal – first place	1956 Imst	Men's doubles

Wilhelm Leimgruber was an Austrian luger who competed in the mid-1950s. He won a gold medal in the men's doubles event at the 1956 European luge championships in Imst, Austria.
