= Karla Kienzl =

Austrian luger (1922–2018)

Medal record

Luge

World Championships
Gold medal – first place	1955 Oslo	Women's singles

European Championships
Gold medal – first place	1951 Igls	Women's singles
Silver medal – second place	1954 Davos	Women's singles
Silver medal – second place	1955 Hahnenklee	Women's singles

Karla Kienzl, carried on the shoulders of her teammates after her Gold Medal win in the World Championship in Oslo, 1955

Karla Kienzl (born Karoline Hauser, sometimes listed as Carla Kienzl; 21 October 1922 – 2 September 2018) was an Austrian luger who competed during the 1950s. She won the gold medal in the women's singles event at the 1955 FIL World Luge Championships in Oslo, Norway. Karla Kienzl was the first World champion in luge in this event.

Kienzl also won three medals in the women's singles event at the European luge championships with one gold (1951) and two silvers (1954, 1955). Kienzl's husband Fritz Kienzl was a European champion in Luge. Karla and Fritz had two children, Wolfgang and Michael.

Karla Kienzl died on 2 September 2018 at the age of 95.
