= Karoline Scheimpflug =

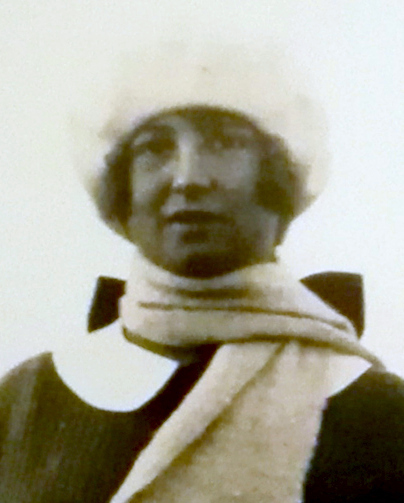

Medal record

Luge

European Championships
| Gold medal – first place | 1929 Semmering | Women's singles |
| Bronze medal – third place | 1954 Davos | Women's singles |
| Bronze medal – third place | 1956 Imst | Women's singles |

Karoline ″Lotte″ Scheimpflug (née Embacher, 15 June 1908 – 30 January 1997) was an Austrian (later Italian) luger who competed from the late 1920s to the late 1950s. Born in Innsbruck in June 1908, she won a gold medal in the women's singles event at the 1929 European luge championships in Semmering, Austria and two bronze medals in the women's singles event at the European championships (1954, 1956). Scheimpflug died in Vienna in January 1997 at the age of 88.
