= Kienzle =

Kienzle is a family name originating in the Swabian-speaking areas of Southwestern Germany. The traditional Swabian pronunciation of the name is [ˈkiə̯ntslə], and in Standard German it is pronounced with a long /iː/ rather than a diphthong: [ˈkiːntslə]. It is quite common in Swabia and other Alemannic-speaking areas.

Other forms of the name include Künzli in Switzerland (pronounced [ˈkyə̯ntsli] or [ˈxyə̯ntsli]).

== Etymology ==
The name is ultimately derived from Middle High German Kuonrât (the keen advisor) from which the German first name "Konrad" is also derived. The abbreviated form of Konrad is Kunz, which yielded the Swabian diminutive Küenzle which was subsequently changed to Kienzle through the de-rounding of front vowels around the 13th-14th century.

== Persons ==
- Ulrich Kienzle (1936–2020), German journalist
- Captain Herbert Thomson Kienzle MID OBE MBE. Australian Army during World War II, enlistment number PX177, the "P" indicating residency of Papua New Guinea and the "X" indicating membership of the 2nd Australian Imperial Force. Born 19 May 1905 at Levuka in Fiji, became a leader in ANGAU and New Guinea Force against the Japanese in New Guinea during WW2, designing and organising construction efforts along the Kokoda Track while in command of Papuans, then engineered supply efforts along the track to Australian and American troops fighting along the track and in subsequent battles on the north coast of Papua. Also (the brother of Herbert Thomson Kienzle) NX23282 Major Wallace Alfred Tom Kienzle (the "N" indicating enlistment in New South Wales), 2/2nd Machine Gun Battalion, ANGAU and New Guinea Force, Australian Army. Veteran of New Guinea and Bougainville during WW2.
