= Tilt–shift photography =

Camera technique

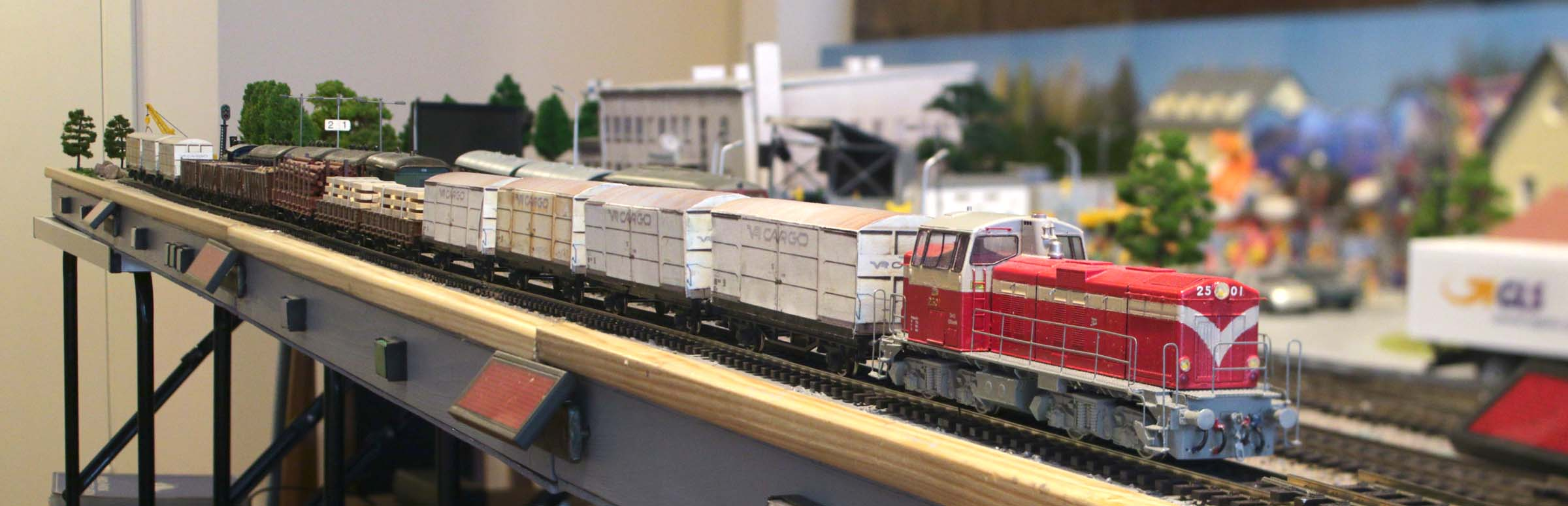
Tilt-lens photo of a model train. The focal plane keeps the entire train in focus, while the blurring of the background proceeds from left to right.

Tilt–shift photography is the use of camera movements that change the orientation or position of the lens with respect to the film or image sensor on cameras.

Sometimes the term is used when a shallow depth of field is simulated with digital post-processing; the name may derive from a perspective control lens (or tilt–shift lens) normally required when the effect is produced optically.

"Tilt–shift" encompasses two different types of movements: rotation of the lens plane relative to the image plane, called tilt, and movement of the lens parallel to the image plane, called shift.

Tilt is used to control the orientation of the plane of focus (PoF), and hence the part of an image that appears sharp; it makes use of the Scheimpflug principle. Shift is used to adjust the position of the subject in the image area without moving the camera back; this is often helpful in avoiding the convergence of parallel lines, as when photographing tall buildings.

== History and use ==
Movements have been available on view cameras since the early days of photography; they have been available on smaller-format cameras since the early 1960s, usually by means of special lenses or adapters. Nikon introduced a lens providing shift movements for their 35 mm SLR cameras in 1962, and Canon introduced a lens that provided both tilt and shift movements in 1973; many other manufacturers soon followed suit. Canon and Nikon currently offer four lenses that provide both movements. Such lenses are frequently used in architectural photography to control perspective, and in landscape photography to get an entire scene sharp.

Some photographers have popularized the use of tilt for selective focus in applications such as portrait photography. The selective focus that can be achieved by tilting the plane of focus is often compelling because the effect is different from that to which many viewers have become accustomed. Ben Thomas, Walter Iooss Jr. of Sports Illustrated, Vincent Laforet and many other photographers have used this technique.

== Perspective-control lenses ==
Keeping the camera level, with an ordinary lens, captures only the bottom portion of the building.

Tilting the camera upwards results in perspective distortion.

Shifting the lens upwards results in a picture of the entire subject without perspective distortion.

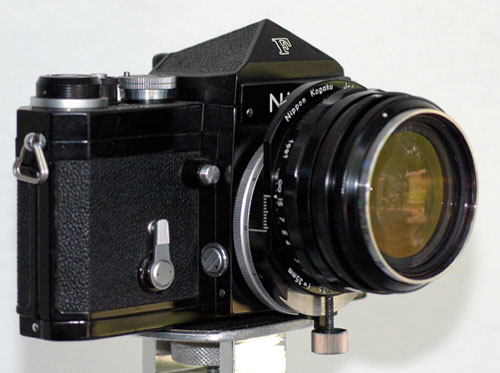
The 1961 35 mm f/3.5 PC-Nikkor lens—the first perspective-control lens for a 35 mm camera

In photography, a perspective-control lens allows the photographer to control the appearance of perspective in the image; the lens can be moved parallel to the film or sensor, providing the equivalent of corresponding view camera movements. This movement of the lens allows adjusting the position of the subject in the image area without moving the camera back; it is often used to avoid convergence of parallel lines, such as when photographing a tall building. A lens that provides only shift is called a shift lens, while those that can also tilt are called tilt–shift lenses. The terms PC and TS are also used by some manufacturers to refer to this type of lens.

Short-focus perspective-control (PC) lenses (i.e., 17 mm through 35 mm) are used mostly in architectural photography; longer focal lengths may also be used in other applications such as landscape, product, and closeup photography. PC lenses are generally designed for single-lens reflex (SLR) cameras, as rangefinder cameras do not allow the photographer to directly view the effect of the lens, and view cameras allow for perspective control using camera movements.

A PC lens has a larger image circle than is required to cover the image area (film or sensor size). Typically, the image circle is large enough, and the mechanics of the lens sufficiently limited, that the image area cannot be shifted outside of the image circle. However, many PC lenses require a small aperture setting to prevent vignetting when significant shifts are employed. PC lenses for 35 mm cameras typically offer a maximum shift of 11 mm; some newer models offer a maximum shift of 12 mm.

The mathematics involved in tilt lenses are described as the Scheimpflug principle, after an Austrian military officer who developed the technique for correcting distortion in aerial photographs.

The first PC lens manufactured for an SLR camera in any format was Nikon's 1961 f/3.5 35 mm PC-Nikkor; it was followed by an f/2.8 35 mm PC-Nikkor (1968), an f/4 28 mm PC-Nikkor (1975), and an f/3.5 28 mm PC-Nikkor (1981). In 1973, Canon introduced a lens, the TS 35 mm f/2.8 SSC, with tilt as well as shift functions.

Other manufacturers, including Venus Optics Laowa, Olympus, Pentax, Schneider Kreuznach (produced as well for Leica), and Minolta, made their own versions of PC lenses. Olympus produced 35 mm and 24 mm shift lenses. Canon currently offers 17 mm, 24 mm, 50 mm, 90 mm and 135 mm tilt/shift lenses. Nikon currently offers F-mount÷ 19 mm, 24 mm, 45 mm, and 85 mm PC lenses with tilt and shift capability. Venus Optics Laowa offers a 15 mm shift lens with an extremely good optical distortion control. Fujifilm announced the 30 mm and 110 mm medium format tilt/shift lenses on Sept. 12 2023.

=== Shape control ===
When the camera back is parallel to a planar subject (such as the front of a building), all points in the subject are at the same distance from the camera, and are recorded at the same magnification. The shape of the subject is recorded without distortion. When the image plane is not parallel to the subject, as when pointing the camera up at a tall building, parts of the subject are at varying distances from the camera; the more distant parts are recorded at lesser magnification, causing the convergence of parallel lines. Because the subject is at an angle to the camera, it is also foreshortened.

When the camera back is not parallel to a planar subject, it is not possible to have the entire subject in focus without the use of tilt or swing; consequently, the image must rely on the depth of field to have the entire subject rendered acceptably sharp.

With a PC lens, the camera back can be kept parallel to the subject while the lens is moved to achieve the desired positioning of the subject in the image area. All points in the subject remain at the same distance from the camera, and the subject shape is preserved. If desired, the camera back can be rotated away from parallel to the subject, to allow some convergence of parallel lines or even to increase the convergence. Again, the position of the subject in the image area is adjusted by moving the lens.

=== Adapters ===
Low-cost tilt/shift adapters are available. However, they can only be used with SLR lenses on mirrorless cameras that have a short enough flange focal distance in order to provide infinity focus. Thus, they are not available for all lens/camera combinations. The image circle of the lens must be larger than the sensor in the camera, in order to avoid vignetting.

=== Aperture control ===
Most SLR cameras provide automatic aperture control, which allows viewing and metering at the lens's maximum aperture, stops the lens down to the working aperture during exposure, and returns the lens to maximum aperture after exposure. For perspective-control and tilt–shift lenses, the mechanical linkage is impractical, and automatic aperture control was not offered on the first such lenses. Many PC and TS lenses incorporated a feature known as a "preset" aperture, which lets the photographer set the lens to working aperture, and then quickly switch between working aperture and full aperture without looking at the aperture control. Though slightly easier than stopped-down metering, operation is less convenient than automatic operation.

When Canon introduced its EOS line of cameras in 1987, the EF lenses incorporated electromagnetic diaphragms, eliminating the need for a mechanical linkage between the camera and the diaphragm. Because of this, the Canon TS-E tilt–shift lenses include automatic aperture control.

In 2008, Nikon introduced its PC-E perspective-control lenses with electromagnetic diaphragms for F-mount cameras. Automatic aperture control is provided with the D300, D500, D600/610, D700, D750, D800/810, D3, D4 and D5 cameras. With some earlier cameras, the lenses offer preset aperture control by means of a pushbutton that controls the electromagnetic diaphragm; with other earlier cameras, no aperture control is provided, and the lenses are not usable.

== Camera movements ==
=== Tilt ===
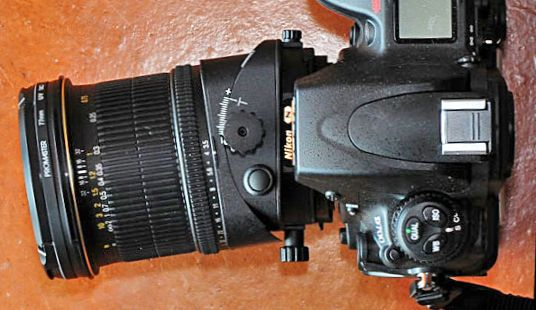
Nikon 24 mm lens, which tilts (as seen here) and also shifts

A camera lens can provide sharp focus on only a single plane. Without tilt, the image plane (containing the film or image sensor), the lens plane, and the plane of focus are parallel, and are perpendicular to the lens axis; objects in sharp focus are all at the same distance from the camera. When the lens plane is tilted relative to the image plane, the plane of focus (PoF) is at an angle to the image plane, and objects at different distances from the camera can all be sharply focused if they lie in the same plane. With the lens tilted, the image plane, lens plane, and PoF intersect at a common line; this behavior has become known as the Scheimpflug principle. When focus is adjusted with a tilted lens, the PoF rotates about an axis at the intersection of the lens's front focal plane and a plane through the center of the lens parallel to the image plane; the tilt determines the distance from the axis of rotation to the center of the lens, and the focus determines the angle of the PoF with the image plane. In combination, the tilt and focus determine the position of the PoF.

The PoF can also be oriented so that only a small part of it passes through the subject, producing a very shallow region of sharpness, and the effect is quite different from that obtained simply by using a large aperture with a regular camera.

Using tilt changes the shape of the depth of field (DoF). When the lens and image planes are parallel, the DoF extends between parallel planes on either side of the PoF. With tilt or swing, the DoF is wedge shaped, with the apex of the wedge near the camera, as shown in Figure 5 in the Scheimpflug principle article. The DoF is zero at the apex, remains shallow at the edge of the lens's field of view, and increases with distance from the camera. For a given position of the PoF, the angle between the planes that define the near and far limits of DoF (i.e., the angular DoF) increases with lens f-number; for a given f-number and angle of the PoF, the angular DoF decreases with increasing tilt. When it is desired to have an entire scene sharp, as in landscape photography, the best results are often achieved with a relatively small amount of tilt. When the objective is selective focus, a large amount of tilt can be used to give a very small angular DoF; however, the tilt fixes the position of the PoF rotation axis, so if tilt is used to control the DoF, it may not be possible to also have the PoF pass through all desired points.

View camera users usually distinguish between rotating the lens about a horizontal axis (tilt), and rotation about a vertical axis (swing); small- and medium-format camera users often refer to either rotation as "tilt".

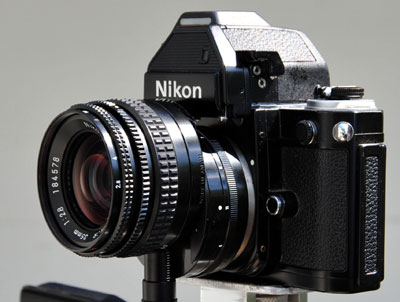
1980 Nikkor 35 mm lens that shifts

=== Shift ===
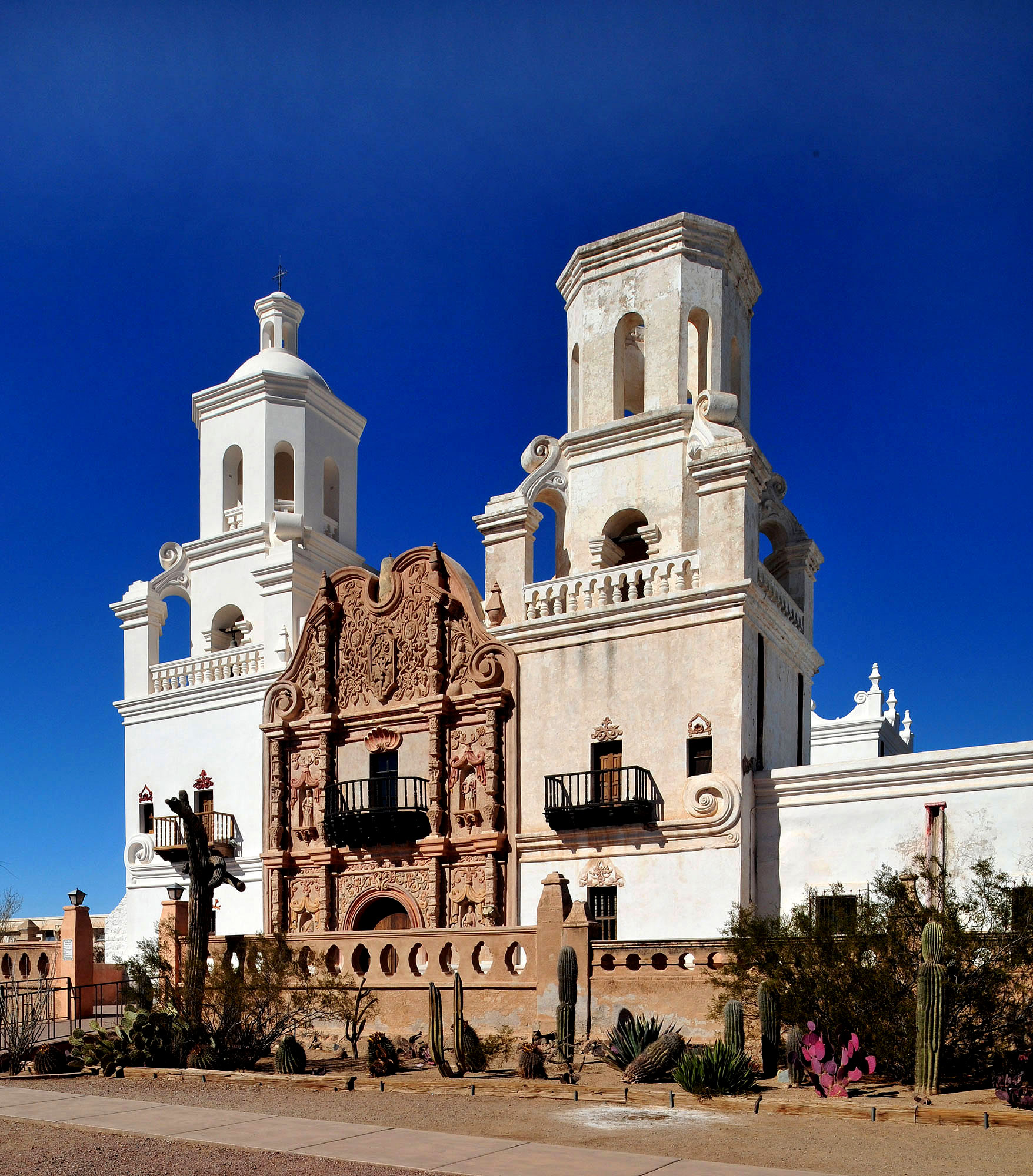
San Xavier del Bac, Tucson, Arizona, US

If a subject plane is parallel to the image plane, parallel lines in the subject remain parallel in the image. If the image plane is not parallel to the subject, as when pointing a camera up to photograph a tall building, parallel lines converge, and the result sometimes appears unnatural, such as a building that appears to be leaning backwards.

Shift is a displacement of the lens parallel to the image plane that allows adjusting the position of the subject in the image area without changing the camera angle; in effect the camera can be aimed with the shift movement. Shift can be used to keep the image plane (and thus focus) parallel to the subject; it can be used to photograph a tall building while keeping the sides of the building parallel. The lens can also be shifted in the opposite direction and the camera tilted up to accentuate the convergence for artistic effect.

Shifting a lens allows different portions of the image circle to be cast onto the image plane, similar to cropping an area along the edge of an image.

Again, view camera users usually distinguish between vertical movements (rise and fall) and lateral movements (shift or cross), while small- and medium-format users often refer to both types of movements as "shift".

=== Lens image circle ===
Whereas the image circle of a standard lens usually just covers the image frame, a lens that provides tilt or shift must allow for displacement of the lens axis from the center of the image frame, and consequently requires a larger image circle than a standard lens of the same focal length.

== Applying camera movements ==
On a view camera, the tilt and shift movements are inherent in the camera, and many view cameras allow a considerable range of adjustment of both the lens and the camera back. Applying movements on a small- or medium-format camera usually requires a tilt–shift lens or perspective control lens. The former allows tilt, shift, or both; the latter allows only shift. With a tilt–shift lens, adjustments are available only for the lens, and the range is usually more limited.

Tilt–shift and perspective-control lenses are available for many SLR cameras, but most are far more expensive than comparable lenses without movements. The Lensbaby SLR lens is a low-cost alternative for providing tilt and swing for many SLR cameras, although the effect is somewhat different from that of the lenses just described. Because of the simple optical design, there is significant curvature of field, and sharp focus is limited to a region near the lens axis. Consequently, the Lensbaby's primary application is selective focus and toy camera–style photography.

== Selective focus ==
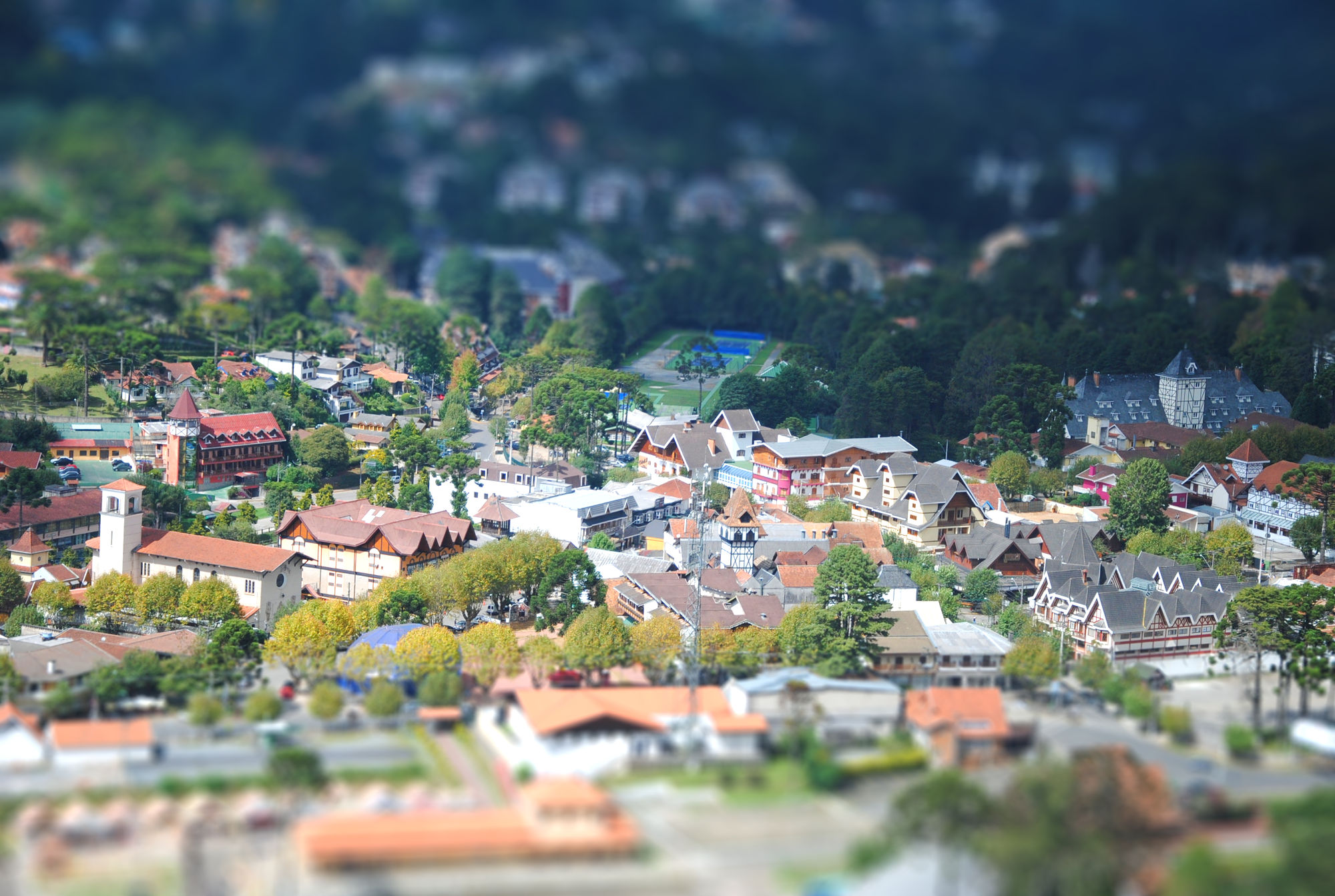
Bird's eye view of Campos do Jordão, Brazil

Selective focus can be used to direct the viewer's attention to a small part of the image while de-emphasizing other parts.

With tilt, the effect is different from that obtained by using a large f-number without tilt. With a regular camera, the PoF and the DoF are perpendicular to the line of sight; with tilt, the PoF can be almost parallel to the line of sight, and the DoF can be very narrow but extend to infinity. Thus parts of a scene at greatly different distances from the camera can be rendered sharp, and selective focus can be given to different parts of a scene at the same distance from the camera.

With tilt, the depth of field is wedge shaped. As noted above, using a large amount of tilt and a small f-number gives a small angular DoF. This can be useful if the objective is to provide selective focus to different objects at essentially the same distance from the camera. But in many cases, effective use of tilt for selective focus requires a careful choice of what is sharp as well as what is unsharp, as Vincent Laforet has noted. Because the tilt also affects the position of the PoF, it may not be possible to use a large amount of tilt and have the PoF pass through all desired points. This may not be a problem if only one point is to be sharp; for example, if it is desired to emphasize one building in a row of buildings, the tilt and f-number can be used to control the width of the sharp area, and the focus used to determine which building is sharp. But if it is desired to have two or more points sharp (for example, two people at different distances from the camera), the PoF must include both points, and it usually is not possible to achieve this while also using the tilt to control DoF.

Selective focus using tilt appears in motion pictures such as Minority Report, (2002). Director of photography Janusz Kamiński says he prefers using tilt–shift lenses to digital post-production as too much digital can detract and "It doesn't look organic."

=== Miniature faking ===
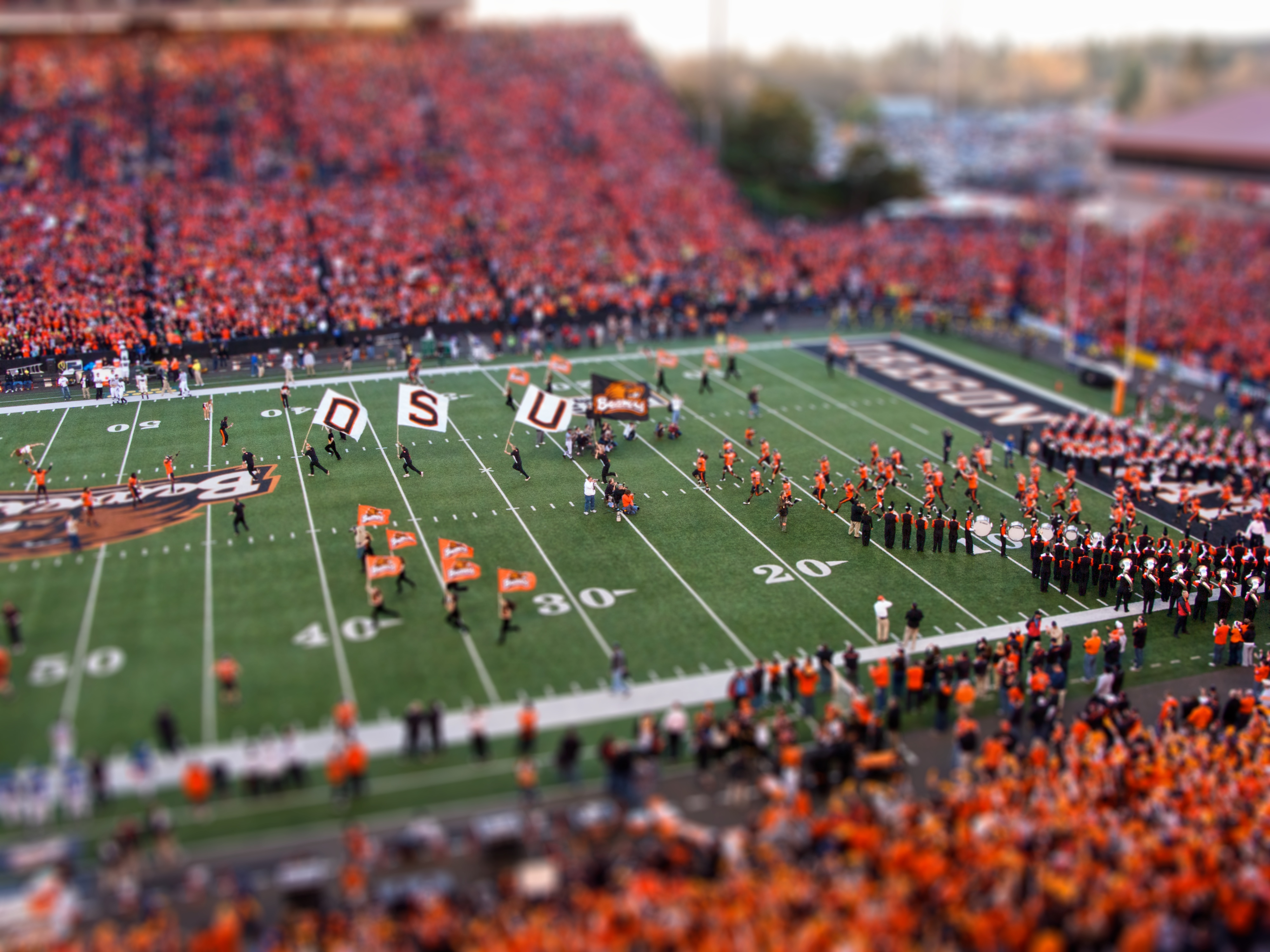
Miniature simulation using digital post processing

Selective focus via tilt is often used to simulate a miniature scene, so much that "tilt-and-shift effect" has been used as a general term for some miniature faking techniques.

Basic digital post-processing techniques can give results similar to those achieved with tilt, and afford greater flexibility and control, such as choosing the region that is sharp and the amount of blur for the unsharp regions. Moreover, these choices can be made after the photograph is taken. One advanced technique, Smallgantics, is used for motion-pictures; it was first seen in the 2006 Thom Yorke music video "Harrowdown Hill", directed by Chel White. Artist Olivo Barbieri is well known for his miniature-faking skills in the 1990s. Artist Ben Thomas's series Cityshrinker extended this concept to miniature faking major cities around the world, his book Tiny Tokyo: The Big City Made Mini (Chronicle Books, 2014), depicts Tokyo in miniature.

== Applications ==
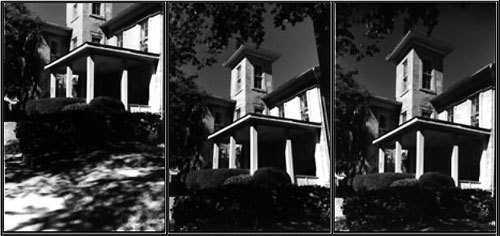
In the left photo, the camera has been leveled but no shift lens used. The top of the house is not in shot.; In the center photo, the same camera is tilted up to take in the whole house. The building appears to lean backwards.; In the right photo, a shift (or PC) lens gives the results wanted.

When making photographs of a building or other large structure from the ground, perspective can be eliminated by keeping the film plane parallel to the building. With ordinary lenses, this results in capturing only the bottom part of the subject.

Tilting the camera upwards results in a perspective effect that causes the top of the building to appear smaller than its base, which is often considered undesirable. The perspective effect is proportional to the lens's angle of view.

With a perspective control lens, however, the lens may be shifted upwards in relation to the image area, placing more of the subject within the frame. The ground level, the camera's point of perspective, is shifted towards the bottom of the frame.

Another use of shifting is in taking pictures of a mirror. By moving the camera off to one side of the mirror, and shifting the lens in the opposite direction, an image of the mirror can be captured without the reflection of the camera or photographer. Shifting can similarly be used to photograph "around" an object, such as a building support in a gallery, without producing an obviously oblique view.

== Perspective-control in software ==
Computer software (such as Photoshop's perspective and distort functions) can be used to control perspective effects in post-production. However, this technique does not allow the recovery of lost resolution in the more distant areas of the subject, or the recovery of lost depth of field due to the angle of the film/sensor plane to the subject. Areas of the image enlarged by these digital techniques may suffer from the visual effects of pixel interpolation, depending on the original image resolution, degree of manipulation, print/display size, and viewing distance.

The effect of using tilt or swing movements is less easily accomplished in post-production. If every part of the image is within the depth of field, it is fairly easy to simulate the effect of shallow depth of field that could be achieved by using tilt or swing; however, if the image has a finite depth of field, post-production cannot simulate the sharpness that could be achieved by using tilt or swing to maximize the region of sharpness.

== See also ==
- Brenizer Method
- Canon TS-E 24mm lens
- Lensbaby, another type of movable lens
- Nikon PC-E Nikkor 24mm f/3.5D ED
- Tilted plane focus
- View camera, a camera type that allows tilt and shift control

== Cited works ==
- Held, R. T.; Cooper, E. A.; O'Brien, J. F.; Banks, M. S. (March 2010). "Using blur to affect perceived distance and size" (PDF). ACM Transactions on Graphics. 29 (2): 19:11. doi:10.1145/1731047.1731057. ISSN 0730-0301. PMC 3088122. PMID 21552429.
- Ray, Sidney F. (2000). "The geometry of image formation". In Jacobson, Ralph E.; Ray, Sidney F.; Atteridge, Geoffrey G.; Axford, Norman R. (eds.). The Manual of Photography: Photographic and Digital Imaging (9th ed.). Oxford: Focal Press. ISBN 0-240-51574-9.
