= Perspective control =

Reducing photographic perspective distortion

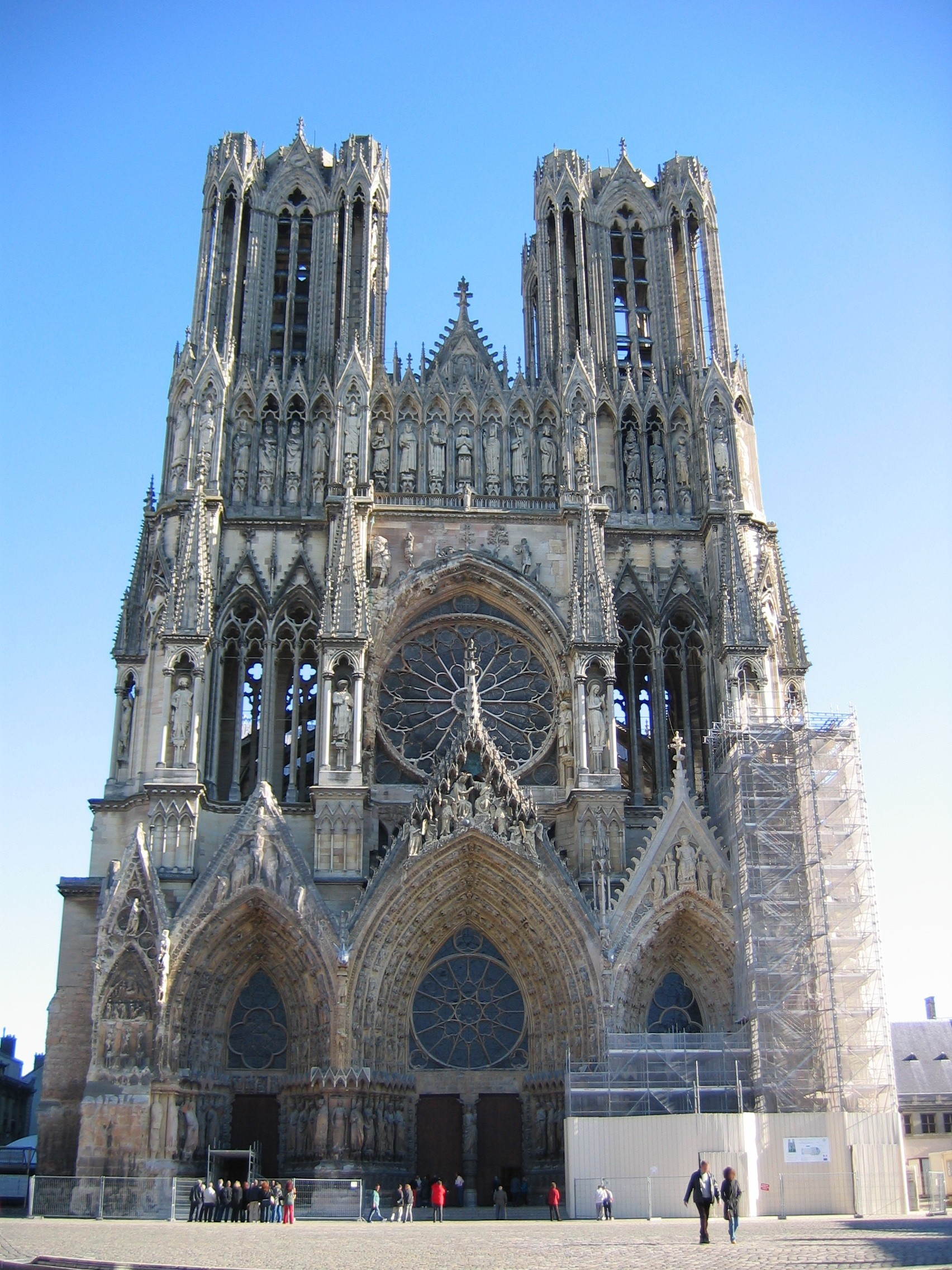
Picture of Notre Dame de Reims showing perspective distortion

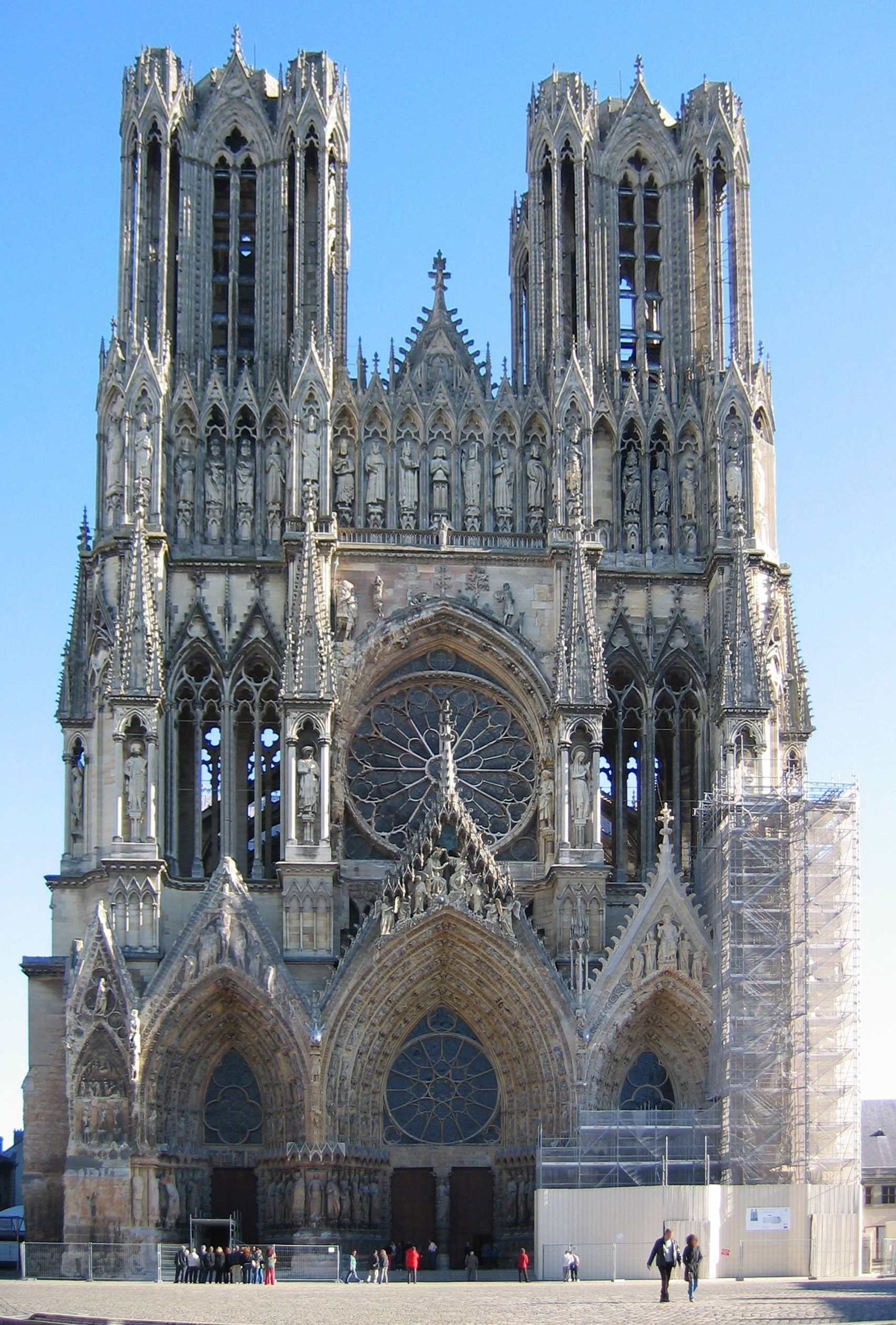
The same picture corrected

Perspective control, also known as perspective correction, is a procedure for composing or editing photographs to better conform with the commonly accepted distortions in constructed perspective. The control would:

- make all lines that are vertical in reality vertical in the image. This includes columns, vertical edges of walls, and lampposts. This is a commonly accepted distortion in constructed perspective; perspective is based on the notion that more distant objects are represented as smaller on the page; however, even though the top of the cathedral tower is in reality further from the viewer than base of the tower (due to the vertical distance), constructed perspective considers only the horizontal distance and considers the top and bottom to be the same distance away;
- make all parallel lines (such as four horizontal edges of a cubic room) cross in one point.

Perspective distortion occurs in photographs when the film plane is not parallel to lines that are required to be parallel in the photo. A common case is when a photo is taken of a tall building from ground level by tilting the camera upward: the building appears to fall away from the camera.

== At exposure ==
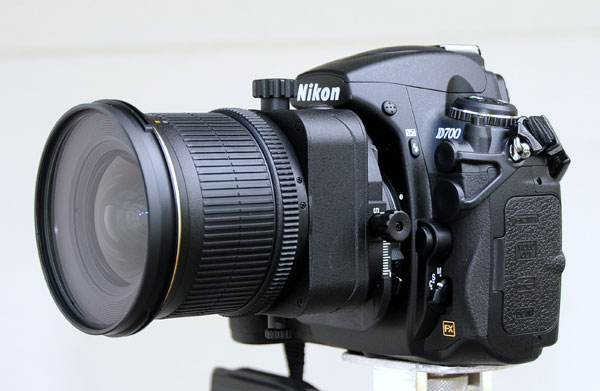
24mm PC-E Nikkor tilt–shift lens on the Nikon D700, made for DSLR and 35mm SLR cameras

Professional cameras where perspective control is important control the perspective at exposure by raising the lens parallel to the film. There is more information on this in the view camera article.

Most large format (4x5 and up) cameras have this feature, as well as plane of focus control built into the camera body in the form of flexible bellows and moveable front (lens) and rear (film holder) elements. Thus any focal length lens mounted on a view camera or field camera, and many press cameras can be used with perspective control.

Some interchangeable lens medium format, 35 mm film SLR, and Digital SLR camera systems have PC, shift, or tilt/shift lens options which allow perspective control and, in the case of a tilt/shift lens, plane of focus control, but only at a specific focal length.

== In the darkroom ==
A darkroom technician can correct perspective distortion in the printing process. It is usually done by exposing the paper at an angle to the film, with the paper raised toward the part of the image that is larger, therefore not allowing the light from the enlarger to spread as much as the other side of the exposure.

The process is known as rectification printing, and is done using a rectifying printer (transforming printer), which involves rotating the negative and/or easel. Restoring parallelism to verticals (for instance) is easily done by tilting one plane, but if the focal length of the enlarger is not suitably chosen, the resulting image will have vertical distortion (compression or stretching). For correct perspective correction, the proper focal length (specifically, angle of view) must be chosen so that the enlargement replicates the perspective of the camera.

== During digital post-processing ==
Digital post-processing software provides means to correct converging verticals and other distortions introduced at image capture.

Adobe Photoshop, Affinity Photo and GIMP have several "transform" options to achieve, with care, the desired control without any significant degradation in the overall image quality. Photoshop CS2 and subsequent releases includes perspective correction as part of its Lens Distortion Correction Filter; DxO Optics Pro from DxO Labs includes perspective correction. Affinity Photo 2 includes all the main distortion corrections. GIMP (since 2.6) has its own perspective tool (Tools/Transform Tools/Perspective). RawTherapee, a free and open-source raw converter, includes horizontal and vertical perspective correction tools too. Note that because the mathematics of projective transforms depends on the angle of view, perspective tools require that the angle of view or 35 mm equivalent focal length be entered, though this can often be determined from Exif metadata.

It is commonly suggested to correct perspective using a general projective transformation tool, correcting vertical tilt (converging verticals) by stretching out the top; this is the "Distort Transform" in Photoshop, and the "perspective tool" in GIMP. However, this introduces vertical distortion – objects appear squat (vertically compressed, horizontally extended) – unless the vertical dimension is also stretched. This effect is minor for small angles, and can be corrected by hand, manually stretching the vertical dimension until the proportions look right, but is automatically done by specialized perspective transform tools.

An alternative interface, found in Photoshop (CS and subsequent releases) is the "perspective crop", which enables the user to perform perspective control with the cropping tool, setting each side of the crop to independently determined angles, which can be more intuitive and direct.

Other software with mathematical models on how lenses and different types of optical distortions affect the image can correct this by being able to calculate the different characteristics of a lens and re-projecting the image in a number of ways (including non-rectilinear projections). An example of this kind of software is the panorama creation suite Hugin.

However these techniques do not enable the recovery of lost spatial resolution in the more distant areas of the subject, or the recovery of lost depth of field due to the angle of the film/sensor plane to the subject. These transforms involve interpolation, as in image scaling, which degrades the image quality, in particular blurring high-frequency detail. How significant this is depends on the original image resolution, degree of manipulation, print/display size, and viewing distance, and perspective correction must be traded off against preserving high-frequency detail.

== In virtual environments ==
Architectural images are commonly "rendered" from 3D computer models, for use in promotional material. These have virtual cameras within to create the images, which normally have modifiers capable of correcting (or distorting) the perspective to the artist's taste. See 3D projection for details.

== See also ==
- Anamorphosis
- Distortion (optics)
- Keystone effect
