= Raupach =

Raupach is a German surname. People with the name include:

- Ernst Raupach (1784–1852), German playwright
- Hermann Raupach (1728–1778), German composer
- Hilde Raupach, German luger, 1928 European championships Gold Medal winner
- Michael Raupach (1950–2015), Australian climate scientist
