= Rudolf Kauschka =

German-Czech sportsman and mountaineer (1883–1960)

Medal record

Luge

European Championships
Gold medal – first place	1914 Reichenberg	Men's singles
Silver medal – second place	1914 Reichenberg	Men's doubles
Silver medal – second place	1928 Schreiberhau	Men's singles
Silver medal – second place	1929 Semmering	Men's doubles

Rudolf Kauschka (2 October 1883 – 2 April 1960) was a German-Czech sportsman, tourist and mountaineer.

== Life ==
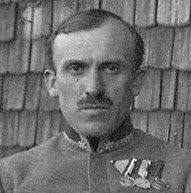
Kauschka in 1918

Kauschka was born on 2 October 1883 in the village of Fukov (German: Fukau) in Bohemia (today non-existent village in the area of Šluknov, Czech Republic). In 1895, his family moved into Bílý Potok. Kauschka completed his studies in 1904 and became a customs officer like his father. During that time, he made numerous trips and climbs in the Jizera Mountains and their surroundings. From 1906 to the end of World War II, he was a member of Liberec section of the Alpenverein (Alpine club in German), making many trips to the Alps. During World War I, he served as a Third Lieutenant in the first unit of mountain guides in the Ortler mountain area. From 1920 until the end of World War II, he and his friends annually visited the Lasörling area in East Tyrol, where he played a role in building the New Liberec Chalet (Neue Reichenberger Hütte in German) that opened in 1926. From 1919 until the end of World War II, he made many "first ascents" in the Jizera Mountains. In 1924, Kauschka wrote a book Wandern und Klettern. After World War II, he was expelled from Czechoslovakia. Kauschka arrived in Kempten either in 1946 or 1947 and would die there on 2 April 1960.

== Sporting career ==
As a luger, Kauschka competed in three European luge championships, winning four medals. His first medals came at the inaugural 1914 championships in Reichenberg (from 1918 known as Liberec), Bohemia, where he won the gold in the men's singles and a silver in the men's doubles events. Kauschka followed up with a silver in the men's singles event at Schreiberhau, Germany (now Szklarska Poręba, Poland) in 1928, then with another silver in the men's doubles event the following year in Semmering, Austria.

== Tourism ==
Kauschka's tourism achievements were both in sports and in alpine mountaineering.

An example of this was one day, he started with friends at 2 am from Liberec to walk across Jizera Mountains to Sněžka in the Giant Mountains (located at the Czech–Polish border). 17 hours later at 7 pm, they were back in Harrachov after resting on the top of Sněžka for two hours.

In 1922, Kauschka and his friends climbed the Ještěd mountain summit twelve times starting at 7 pm one day and finishing at 5:45 pm the next day. During that day they reached an altitude over 5,000 m high, using over 20 different footpaths.

== Ascents ==
From 1904 to 1928, Kauschka did much climbing, starting with the Jizera Mountains, including being the first to climb Zvon (a famous local rock tower) in 1921. He later climbed the Lusatian and Zittauer (part of the Breiteberg chain) mountains, Bohemian Paradise (the first ascent on Draci zub in 1906) and Saxon Switzerland (Blocksstockes). He was also in the Alps, the Dolomites (1907 – climbing the Vajolet Towers solo without a rope), Ortler (1908 – Königspitze in German), and Wallis Alps (1928 – Matterhorn, Mont Blanc).

== Legacy ==
A rock in the Jizera Mountains, Kauschkova věž (lit. 'Kauschka's tower'), was named in his honour. A summit in the Alps 2,903 m (9,524 ft) high was also named in Kauschka's honour, the year before his death.

== Family ==
Kauschka's son Manfred was also a climber, doing the first ascent on Kobyla in Příhrazy (famous route to the local well-known sandstone tower) in 1937 with friends.
