= Erich Dressler =

German luger

Medal record

Luge

European Championships
Bronze medal – third place	1929 Semmering	Men's singles

Erich Dressler was a German luger who competed in the late 1920s. He won a bronze medal in the men's singles event at the 1929 European luge championships in Semmering, Austria.
