= Hench =

Hench is a surname of possible English or Scottish origin. Notable people with the surname include:

- Else Hench, Austrian luger
- John Hench (1908–2004), American employee of The Walt Disney Company
- Julie Diana Hench, American ballet dancer, ballet master, writer and arts administrator
- Kevin Hench, American screenwriter, producer, and columnist
- Philip Showalter Hench (1896–1965), American physician

== See also ==
- Henchman
- Henchmen (film)
