= Robert Liebig =

German luger

Medal record

Luge

European Championships
Silver medal – second place	1929 Semmering	Men's singles

Robert Liebig was a German luger who competed in the late 1920s. He won a silver medal in the men's singles event at the 1929 European luge championships in Semmering, Austria.
