= Ferdinand Wiesner =

Austrian luger

Medal record

Luge

European Championships
Bronze medal – third place	1929 Semmering	Men's doubles

Ferdinand Wiesner was an Austrian luger who competed in the late 1920s. He won a bronze medal in the men's doubles event at the 1929 European championships in Semmering, Austria.
