= Christa Klecker =

Austrian luger

Medal record

Luge

European Championships
Silver medal – second place	1929 Semmering	Women's singles

Christa Klecker was an Austrian luger who competed in the late 1920s. She won a silver medal in the women's singles event at the 1929 European luge championships in Semmering, Austria.
