= FIL European Luge Championships 1929 =

The FIL European Luge Championships 1929 took place in Semmering, Austria under the auspices of the Internationaler Schlittensportsverband (ISSV - International Sled Sports Federation in (in German)), a forerunner to the International Luge Federation.

== Men's singles ==
Medal	Athlete	Time
Gold	Fritz Preissler (TCH)	
Silver	Robert Liebig (GER)	
Bronze	Erich Dressler (GER)	

== Women's singles ==
Medal	Athlete	Time
Gold	Lotte Embacher (GER)	
Silver	Christa Klecker (AUT)	
Bronze	Fanny Altendorfer (AUT)	

== Men's doubles ==
Medal	Athlete	Time
Gold	Germany (Richard Feist, Walter Feist)	
Silver	Czechoslovakia (Rudolf Kauschka, Fritz Preissler)	
Bronze	Austria (Franz Stecker, Ferdinand Wiesner)	

== Medal table ==
Rank	Nation	Gold	Silver	Bronze	Total
1	Germany (GER)	2	1	1	4
2	Czechoslovakia (TCH)	1	1	0	2
3	Austria (AUT)	0	1	2	3
Totals (3 entries)		3	3	3	9
