= Anna Skoda =

Czech luger

Medal record

Luge

European Championships
Gold medal – first place	1914 Reichenberg	Women's singles

Anna Skoda was a Bohemian luger who competed in the early 1910s. She won a gold medal in the women's singles event at the European Championships of 1914 in Reichenberg, Bohemia (now Liberec, Czech Republic).
