= Jacob Platzer =

Italian luger

Medal record

Luge

European Championships
| Silver medal – second place | 1914 Reichenberg | Men's singles |

Jacob Platzer was an Italian luger who competed in the early 1910s. He won a silver medal in the men's singles event at the inaugural European championships of 1914 in Reichenberg, Bohemia (now Liberec, Czech Republic).
