= Herbert Elger =

German luger

Medal record

Luge

European Championships
Gold medal – first place	1928 Schreiberhau	Men's doubles

Herbert Elger was a German luger who competed in the late 1920s. He won a gold medal in the men's doubles event at the 1928 European championships in Schreiberhau, Germany (now Szklarska Poręba, Poland).
