= Karl Löbelt =

German luger

Medal record

Luge

European Championships
Gold medal – first place	1914 Reichenberg	Men's doubles

Karl Löbelt was an ethnic German luger who competed in the early 1910s. He won a gold medal in the men's doubles event at the inaugural European championships of 1914 in Reichenberg, Bohemia (now Liberec, Czech Republic).
