= Fritz Preissler =

Czech luger

Medal record

Luge

European Championships
Gold medal – first place	1928 Schreiberhau	Men's singles
Gold medal – first place	1929 Semmering	Men's singles
Gold medal – first place	1939 Reichenberg	Men's singles
Silver medal – second place	1929 Semmering	Men's doubles

Fritz Preissler (21 June 1908 Hanichen near Reichenberg, Bohemia (now Liberec) – 5 June 1948 in Straubing) was a German-Bohemian luger who competed in the 1920s and 1930s. He won four medals at European luge championships with three golds in the men's singles event (1928, 1929, 1939) and a silver in the men's doubles event (1929).
