= Arthur Klamt =

Austrian luger

Medal record

Luge

European Championships
Bronze medal – third place	1914 Reichenberg	Men's doubles

Arthur Klamt was an Austrian luger who competed in the early 1910s. He won a bronze medal in the men's doubles event at the inaugural European championships of 1914 in Reichenberg, Bohemia (now Liberec, Czech Republic).
