= Margarete Wolff =

German luger

Medal record

Luge

European Championships
Silver medal – second place	1928 Schreiberhau	Women's singles

Margarete Wolff was a German luger who competed in the late 1920s. She won a silver medal in the first-ever women's singles event at the 1928 European luge championships at Schreiberhau, Germany (now Szklarska Poręba, Poland).
