= Bedřich Posselt =

Czechoslovak luger and bobsledder

Medal record

Luge

European Championships
Bronze medal – third place	1928 Schreiberhau	Men's doubles

Bedřich (Fritz) Posselt (born 19 April 1893, date of death unknown) was a Czechoslovak luger and bobsledder who competed from the late 1920s to the mid-1930s. He won a bronze medal in the men's doubles event at the 1928 European championships in Schreiberhau, Germany (now Szklarska Poręba, Poland) and finished 12th in the four-man event at the 1936 Winter Olympics in Garmisch-Partenkirchen.
