= ÖBB Class 1042 =

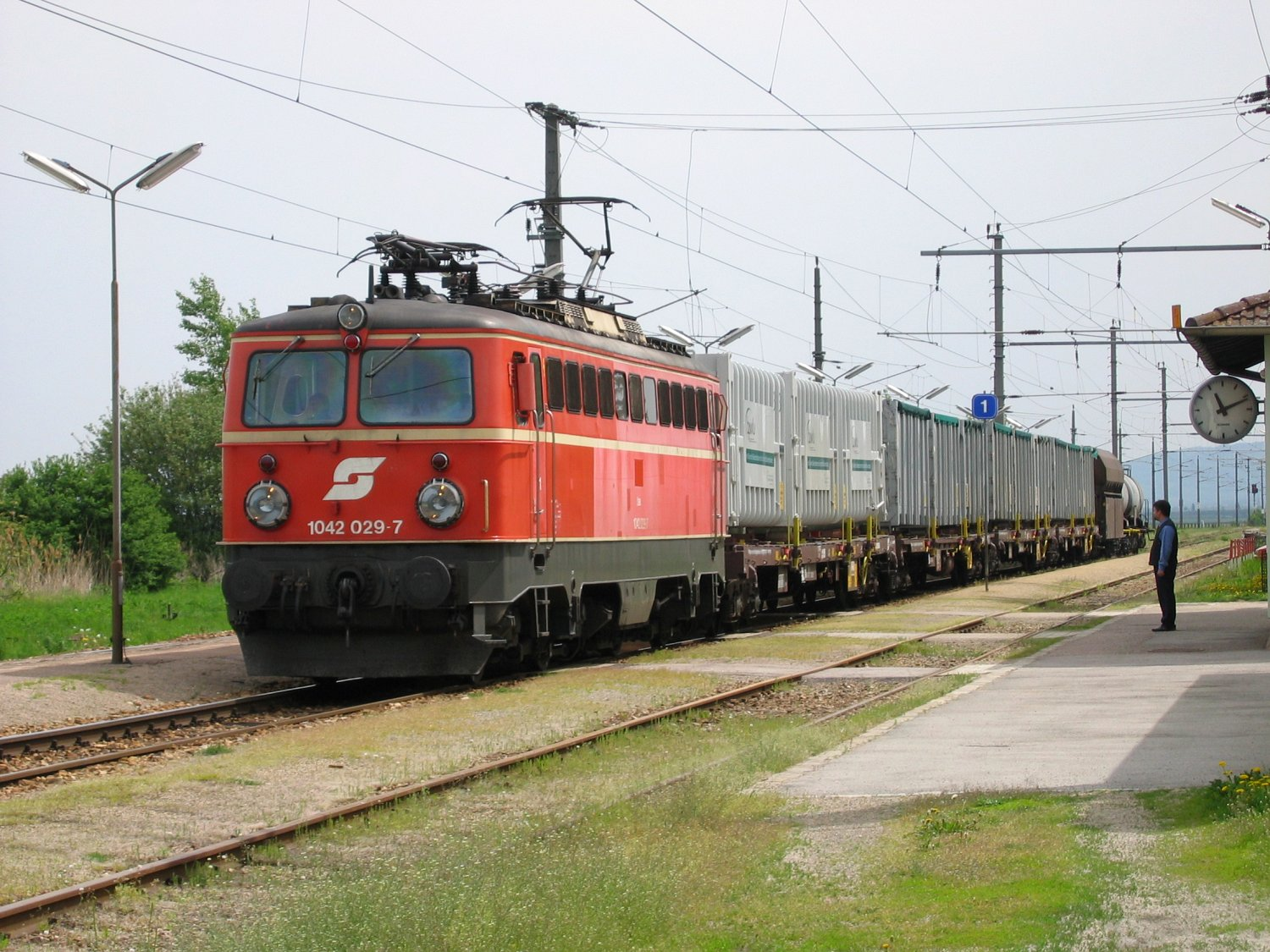
- 1042 029-7 with a goods train at Michelhausen.
Type and origin
- Power type: Electric
- Builder: BES (BBC / ELIN / Siemens); SGP Graz, WLF
- Build date: 1963–1977
- Total produced: 258
Specifications
- Configuration
  - UIC: Bo′Bo′
- Gauge: 1,435 mm (4 ft 8 1/2 in) standard gauge
- Length: 16,220 mm (53 ft 2 5/8 in)
- Loco weight: 1042.0: 83.9 tonnes (82.57 long tons; 92.48 short tons); 1042.5: 82.5 tonnes (81.20 long tons; 90.94 short tons)
- Electric system/s: 15 kV Overhead
- Current pickup: Pantograph
- Safety systems: Sifa, Indusi, PZB
Performance figures
- Maximum speed: 1042.0: 130 km/h (81 mph); 1042.5: 150 km/h (93 mph)
- Power output: 1042.0: 3,260 kW (4,370 hp); 1042.5: 3,480 kW (4,670 hp)
- Tractive effort: 260 kN (58,450 lbf)
Career
- Operators: ÖBB, Hector Rail
- Numbers: 1042.001–060; 1042.501–520; 1042.531–707 (Class 1142)
- Locale: Austria, Sweden

The ÖBB Class 1042 was a class of electric locomotives operated by ÖBB in Austria. From its entry into service in the 1960s, it was an important element of the ÖBB's electrically powered operations. In the 1990s, younger members of the class were converted into Class 1142 locomotives for push–pull operation. The remaining Class 1042 units have since been withdrawn from service.

The four-axle locomotives were assembled from 1963 onwards by Simmering-Graz-Pauker at Lokomotivfabrik Floridsdorf. After the progressive electrification of the Austrian railway network in the 1950s, ÖBB required powerful new engines for operation on the mountain railway lines such as the Semmering pass route. The Class 1042 achieved a maximum speed of 130 km/h (81 mph), later increased to 150 km/h (93 mph). A total of 257 were built until production discontinued in 1977.

== Operations in Sweden ==
Hector Rail purchased twelve Class 1142 locomotives from ÖBB in 2005–2006. The Hector Rail locomotives were reclassified as "Class 142" and its performance is slightly higher than that of the Swedish built Rc locomotives. The locomotives mainly pull trains for SCA in Sweden and the 100-series has radio control while the 200-series has ETCS for operations on lines such as Botniabanan.

== See also ==
- History of rail transport in Austria
- Rail transport in Austria
