= Richard Simm =

Bohemian luger

Medal record

Luge

European Championships
| Bronze medal – third place | 1914 Reichenberg | Men's singles |

Richard Simm was a Bohemian luger who competed in the early 1910s. He won a bronze medal in the men's singles event at the inaugural European championships of 1914 in Reichenberg, Bohemia (now Liberec, Czech Republic).
