= FIL European Luge Championships 1928 =

Sled competition in Schreiberhau, Germany

The FIL European Luge Championships 1928 took place in Schreiberhau, Germany (now Szklarska Poręba, Poland) under the auspices of the Internationaler Schlittensportsverband (ISSV - International Sled Sports Federation in (in German)), a forerunner to the International Luge Federation.

== Men's singles ==
Medal	Athlete	Time
Gold	Fritz Preissler (TCH)	
Silver	Rudolf Kauschka (TCH)	
Bronze	Karl Wagner (GER)	

Kauchska earned his second men's singles medal, fourteen years after earning his first.

== Women's singles ==
Medal	Athlete	Time
Gold	Hilde Raupach (GER)	
Silver	Margarete Wolff (GER)	
Bronze	Else Hench (AUT)	

== Men's doubles ==
Medal	Athlete	Time
Gold	Germany (Herbert Elger, Wilhelm Adolf)	
Silver	Germany (Richard Feist, Walter Feist)	
Bronze	Czechoslovakia (Alfred Posselt, Fritz Posselt)	

== Medal table ==
Rank	Nation	Gold	Silver	Bronze	Total
1	Germany (GER)	2	2	1	5
2	Czechoslovakia (TCH)	1	1	1	3
3	Austria (AUT)	0	0	1	1
Totals (3 entries)		3	3	3	9
