= FIL European Luge Championships 1914 =

The FIL European Luge Championships 1914 took place in Reichenberg, Bohemia (then under Austria-Hungary, now Liberec, Czech Republic) under the auspices of the Internationaler Schlittensportsverband (ISSV - International Sled Sports Federation in (in German)), a forerunner to the International Luge Federation.

== Men's singles ==
Medal	Athlete	Time
Gold	Rudolf Kauschka (AUT)	
Silver	Jakob Platzer (AUT)	
Bronze	Richard Simm (AUT)	

== Women's singles ==
Medal	Athlete	Time
Gold	Anna Skoda (AUT)	
Silver	Anna Rothe (AUT)	
Bronze	Resi Jahnel (AUT)	

Only the gold medalist was listed in the bsd.de reference shown in the References section below. The Women's race war not officially part of the European Luge Championships 1914, but were held at the samo occasion as Meisterschaft der österreichischen Sudetenländer (Championship of the Austrian Sudetenland). There were also held a mixed doubles event, won by Wera Czernin and O. Weißenstein.

== Doubles ==
Medal	Athlete	Time
Gold	Austria (Erwin Posselt, Karl Löbelt)	
Silver	Rudolf Kauschka (AUT), Hans Gfäller (GER)	
Bronze	Austria (Arthur Klamt, Bertold Posselt)	

The silver medalist pair of Kauschka and Gfäller are the only time in the championships' history where the medal winners were not from the same nation. However, it was not representatives of national associations that started at these championships, but individual starters. Thus, a greater mix among the drivers was possible.

== Medal table ==
Rank	Nation	Gold	Silver	Bronze	Total
1	Austria (AUT)	3	1.5	2	6.5
2	Germany (GER)	0	0.5	0	0.5
Totals (2 entries)		3	2	2	7
