= Karl Wagner (luger) =

German luger

Medal record

Luge

European Championships
Bronze medal – third place	1928 Schreiberhau	Men's singles

Karl Wagner was a German luger who competed in the late 1920s. He won a bronze medal in the men's singles event at the 1928 European luge championships in Schreiberhau, Germany (now Szklarska Poręba, Poland).
