= Else Hench =

Austrian luger

Medal record

Luge

European Championships
Bronze medal – third place	1928 Schreiberhau	Women's singles

Else Hench was an Austrian luger who competed in the late 1920s. She won a bronze medal in the first-ever women's singles event at the 1928 European luge championships at Schreiberhau, Germany (now Szklarska Poręba, Poland).
