= Hilde Raupach =

German luger

Medal record

Luge

European Championships
| Gold medal – first place | 1928 Schreiberhau | Women's singles |

Hilde Raupach was a German luger who competed in the late 1920s. She won the women's singles event at the 1928 European luge championships at Schreiberhau, Germany (now Szklarska Poręba, Poland).
