= Semmering Railway =

Railway line in Austria

Coordinates: 47.643°N 15.831°E

Semmeringbahn
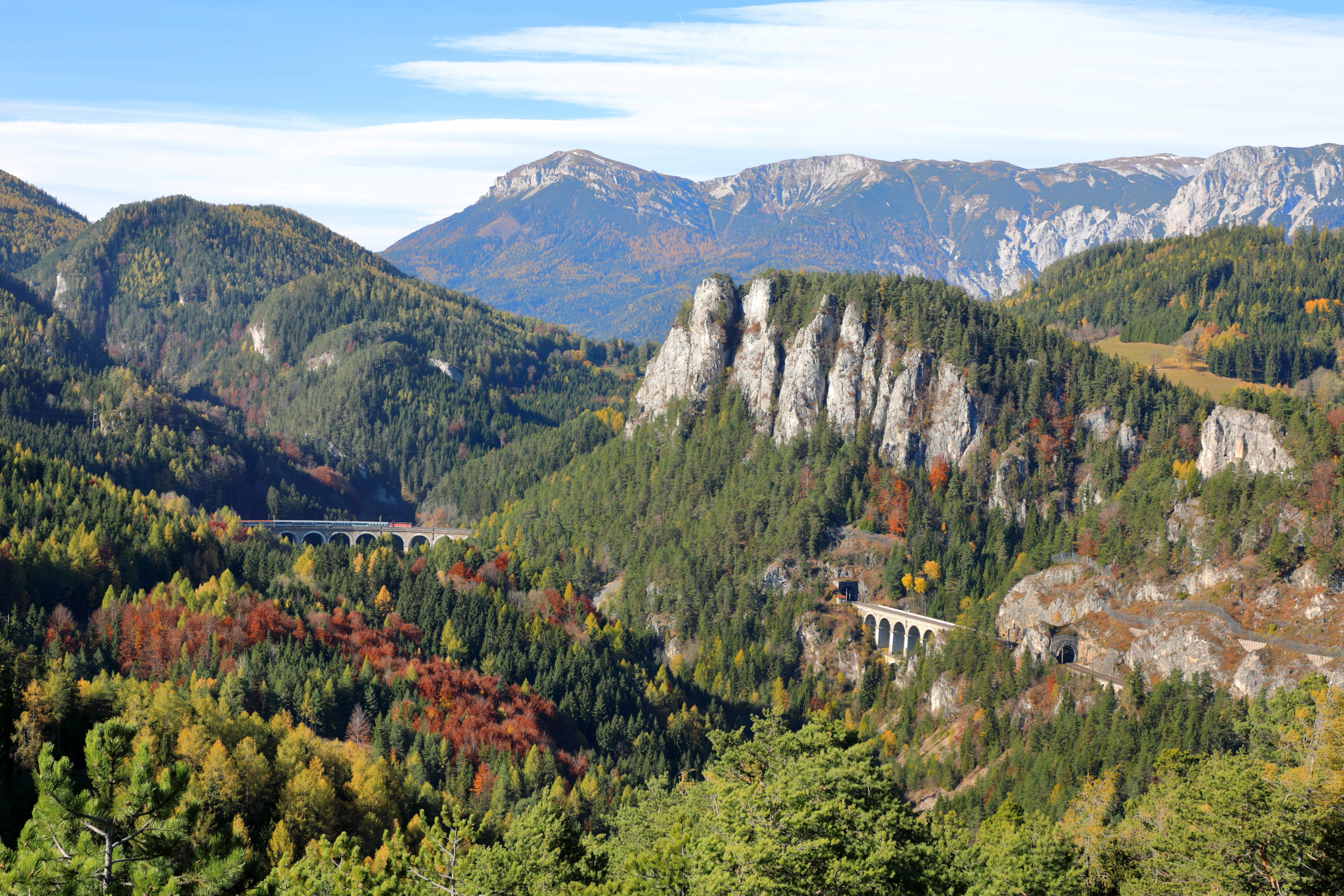
- Semmering railway with surrounding mountain scenery

Overview
- Owner: Austrian Federal Railways

Service
- Operator: Austrian Federal Railways

Technical
- Line length: 41 km (25.5 mi)
- Track gauge: 1,435 mm (4 ft 8 1/2 in) standard gauge
- Minimum radius: 190 m (623 ft)
- Electrification: 15 kV, 16 2/3 Hz Overhead line
- Maximum incline: 2.5 %

UNESCO World Heritage Site
- Criteria: Cultural: ii, iv
- Reference: 785
- Inscription: 1998 (22nd Session)
- Area: 156.18 ha (385.9 acres)
- Buffer zone: 8,581.21 ha (21,204.6 acres)
Route map
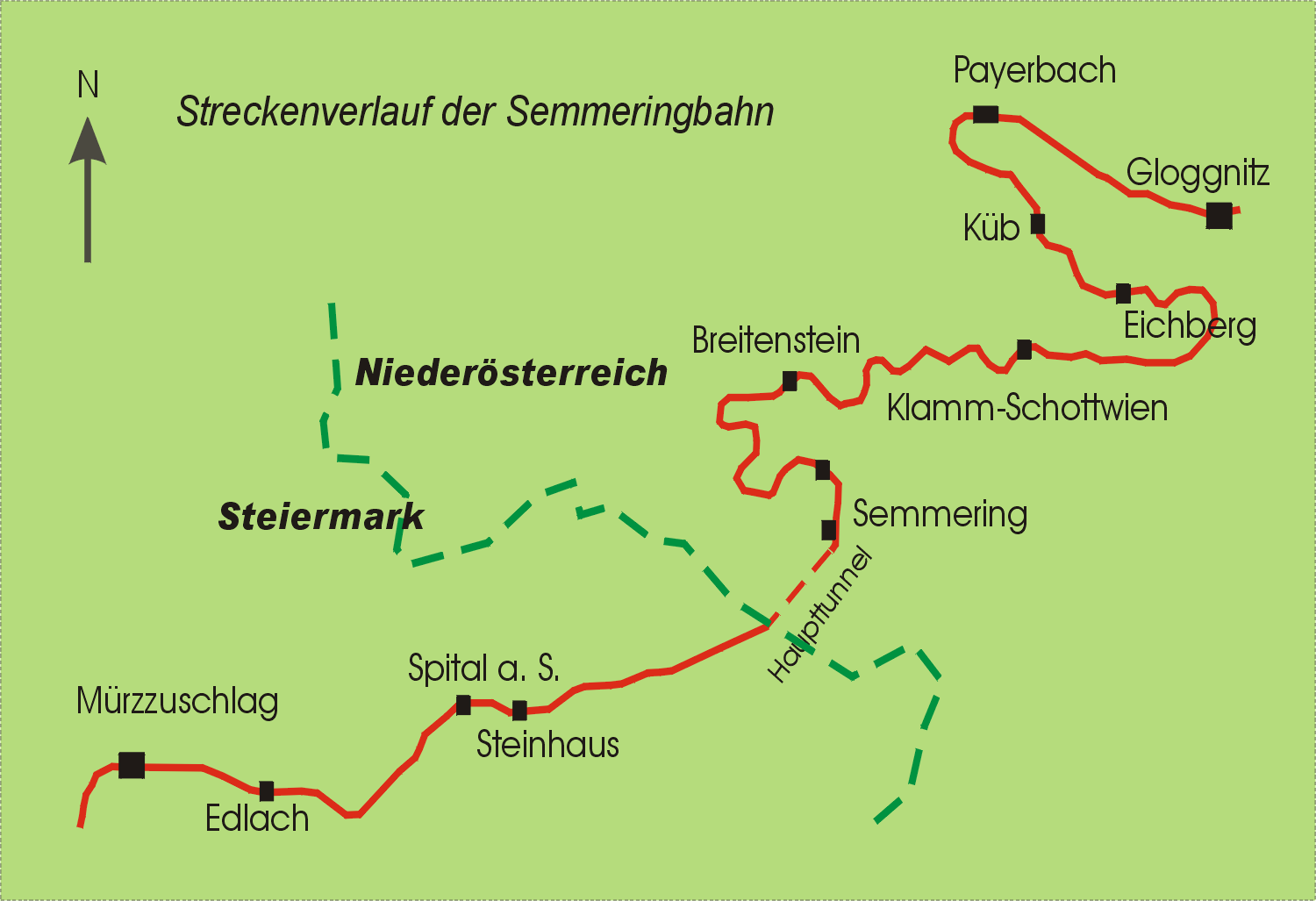

The Semmering Railway (German: Semmeringbahn) in Austria, which starts at Gloggnitz and leads over the Semmering to Mürzzuschlag, was the first mountain railway in Europe built with a standard gauge track. It is commonly referred to as the world's first true mountain railway, given the very difficult terrain and the considerable altitude difference that was mastered during its construction. It is still fully functional as a part of the Southern Railway which is operated by the Austrian Federal Railways.

== History ==
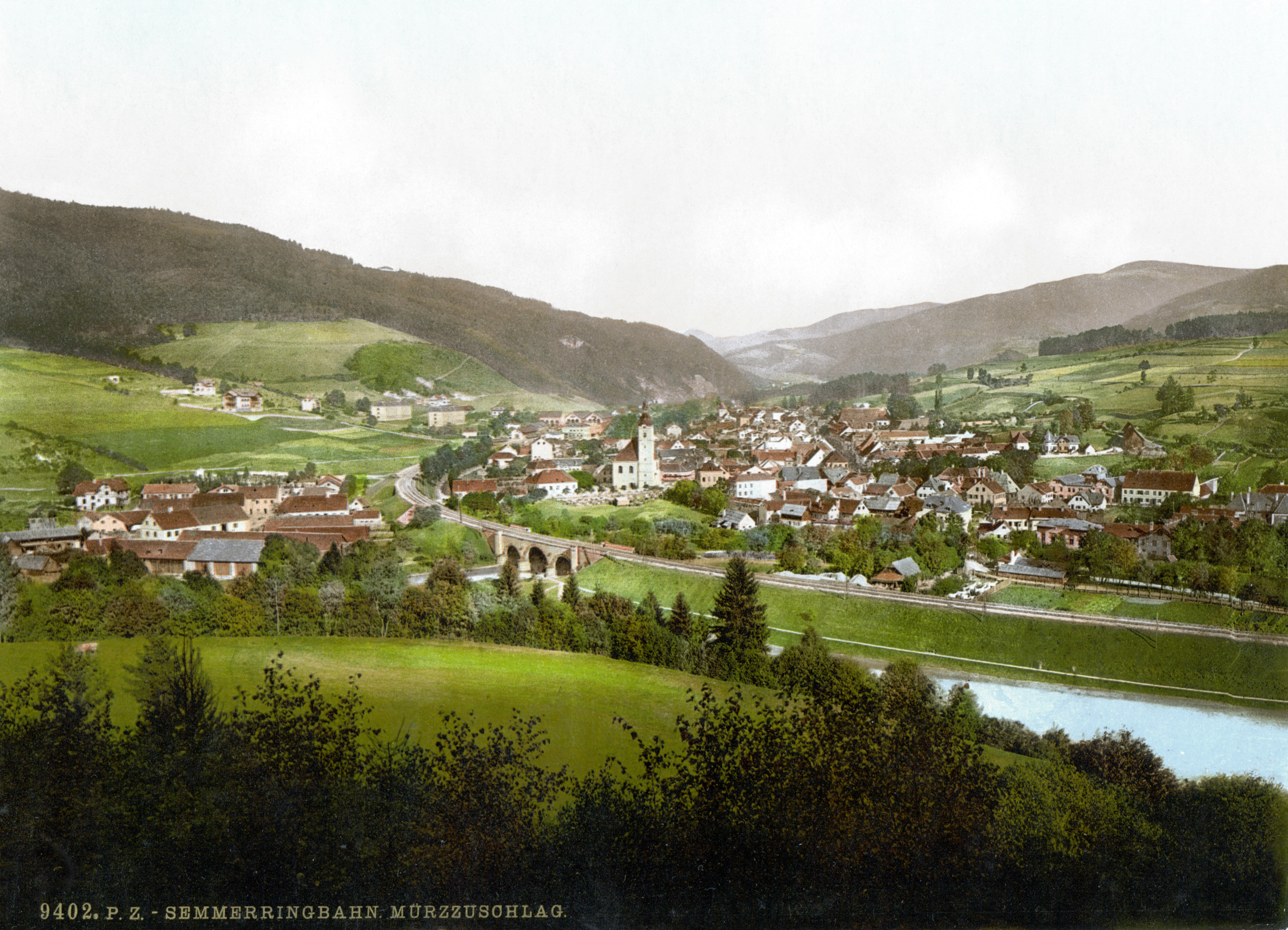
Semmering railway at Mürzzuschlag, around 1900

The Semmering railway was constructed between 1848 and 1854 by some 20,000 workers under the project's designer and director Carl von Ghega. The construction features 14 tunnels (among them the 1,431 m summit tunnel), 16 viaducts (several two-storey) and over 100 stone arch bridges and 11 small iron bridges. The stations and the buildings for the supervisors were often built directly from the waste rock dug out when making the tunnels.

Across an overall track length of 41 km the Semmering railway overcomes an altitude difference of 460 m; on 60% of its length the gradient is 2.0-2.5% (equivalent to a 1-meter difference in altitude on a 40 m route distance) and 16% exhibit a curvature radius of only 190 m. This was an entirely new technical dimension of railway construction, and new instruments and methods of surveying had to be developed to handle the resulting challenges. Also, new technologies were employed for the Engerth locomotives because the types in general use at this time could not handle the extreme gradients and turning radii.

Even while being built, the Semmering railway was perceived as an effort of "landscape gardening", i.e. it attempted a harmonious combination of technology and nature. The unique travel experience which the Semmering railway offered contributed significantly to the original opening of the Semmering region for tourism. Numerous hotels and mansions are witnesses of this epoch. This enormous upswing to the turn of the century and the re-evaluation of the region as a winter sports area in the first third of the 20th Century were interrupted first by World War I and then by the changed recreational needs of the population. Therefore, this unique culture landscape could be preserved with little change. A trip on the Semmering railway, which is in full use 160 years after its building, still impresses the traveller as a special experience by its varied landscape, the typical style of its mansions and the characteristic sequence of viaducts and tunnels.

In 1998 the Semmering railway was added to the list of the UNESCO World Heritage sites.

Viaducts

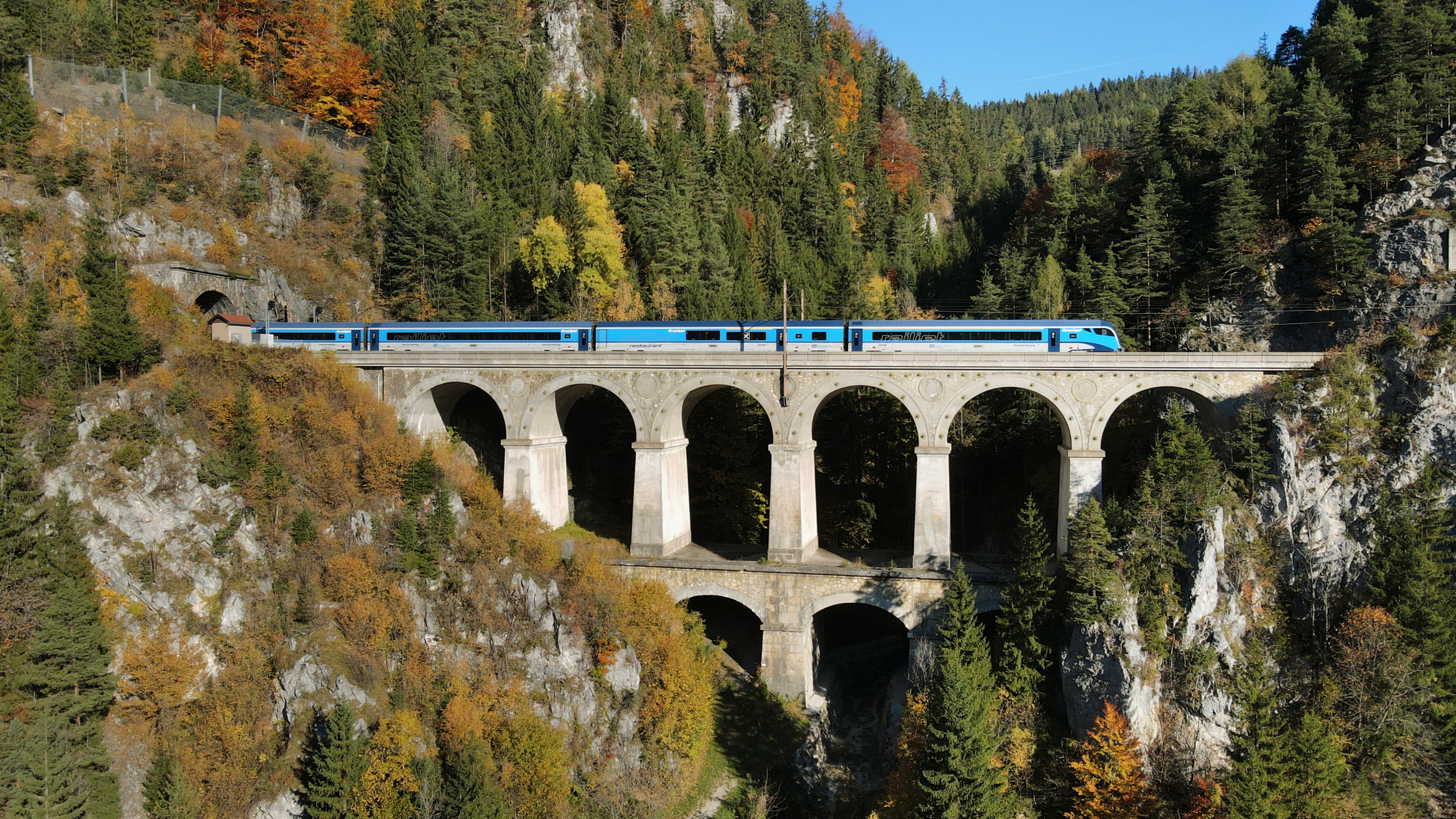
Krausel Klause

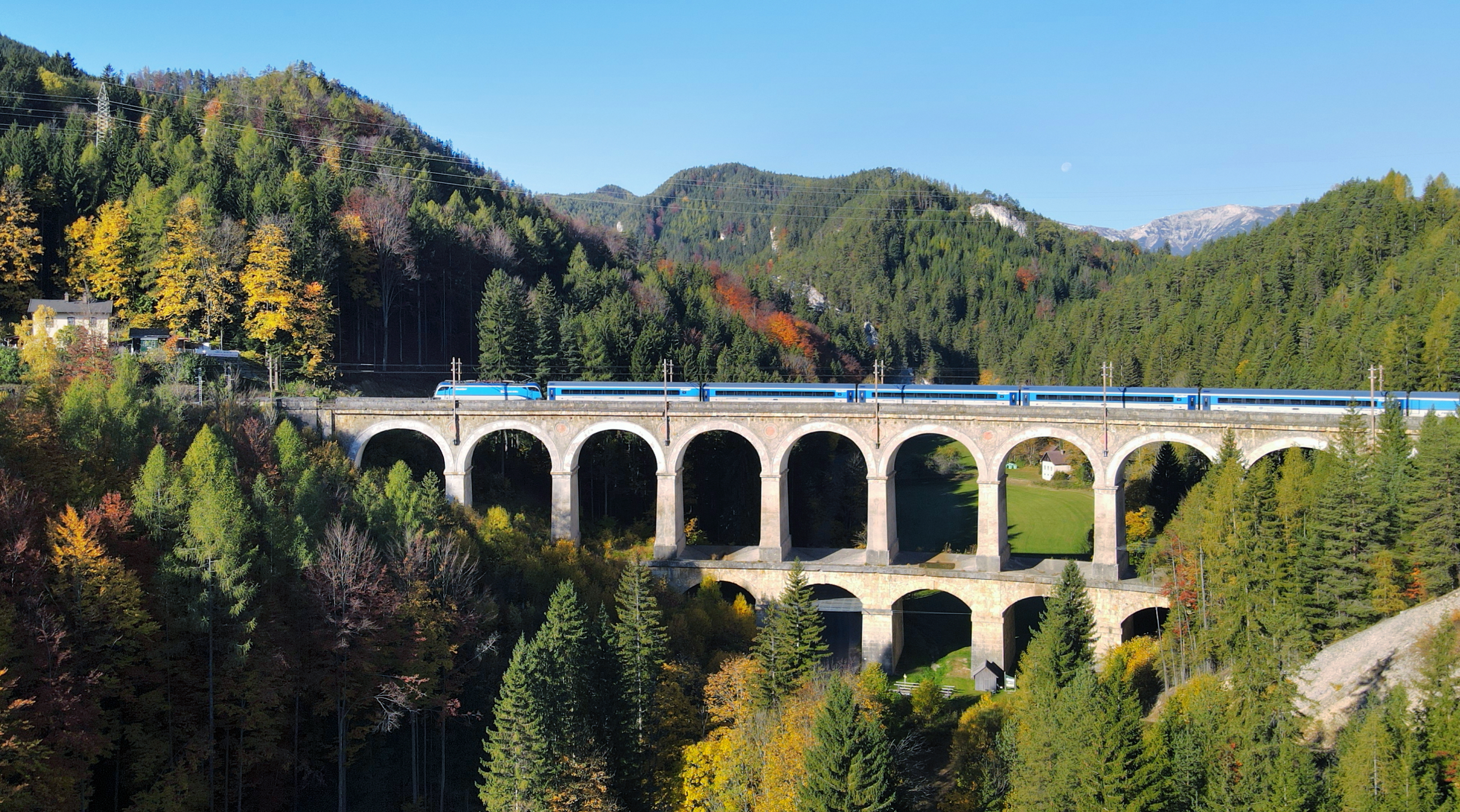
Kalte Rinne

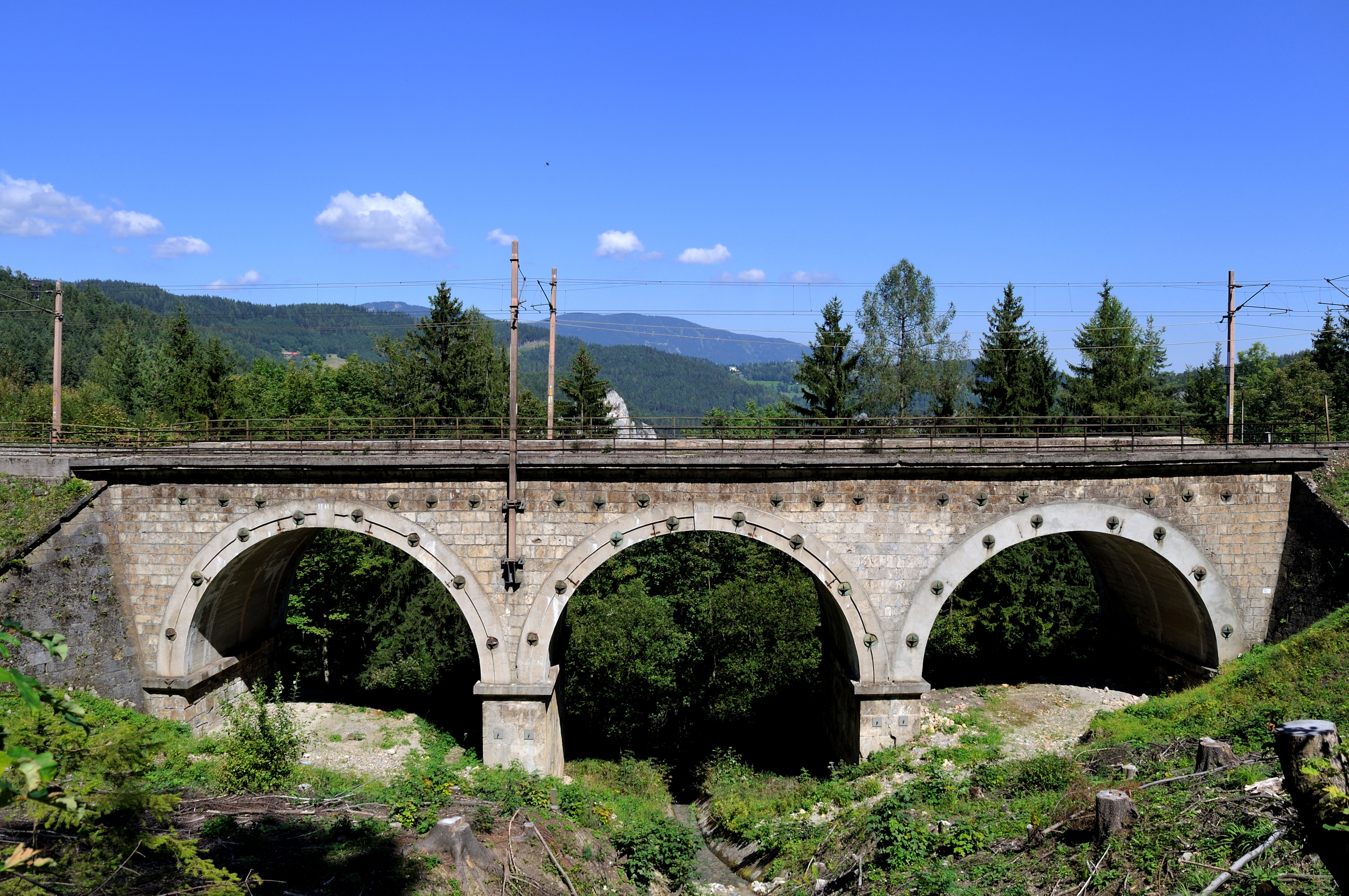
Kartnerkogel
Tunnels

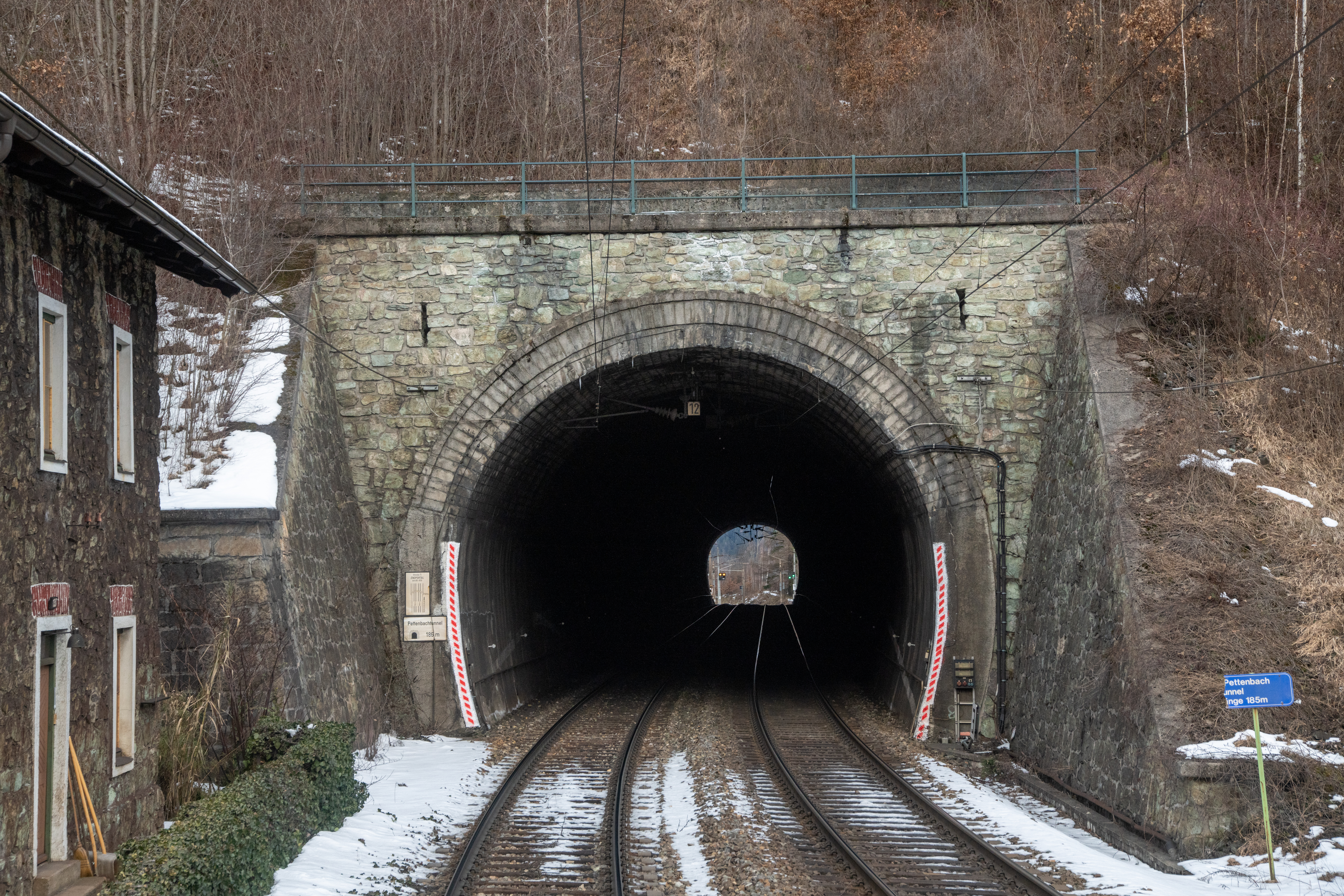
Pettenbach

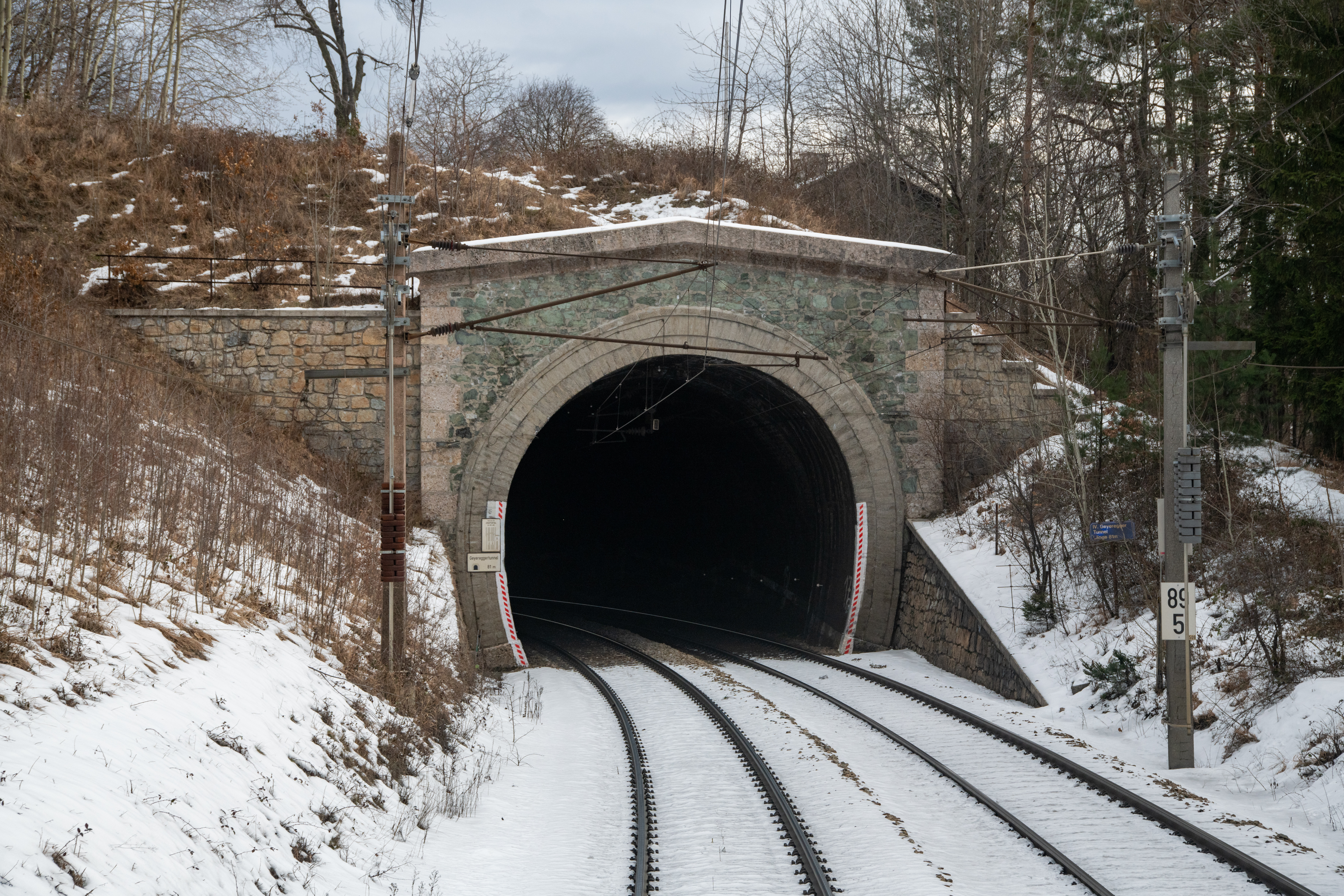
Geyeregger

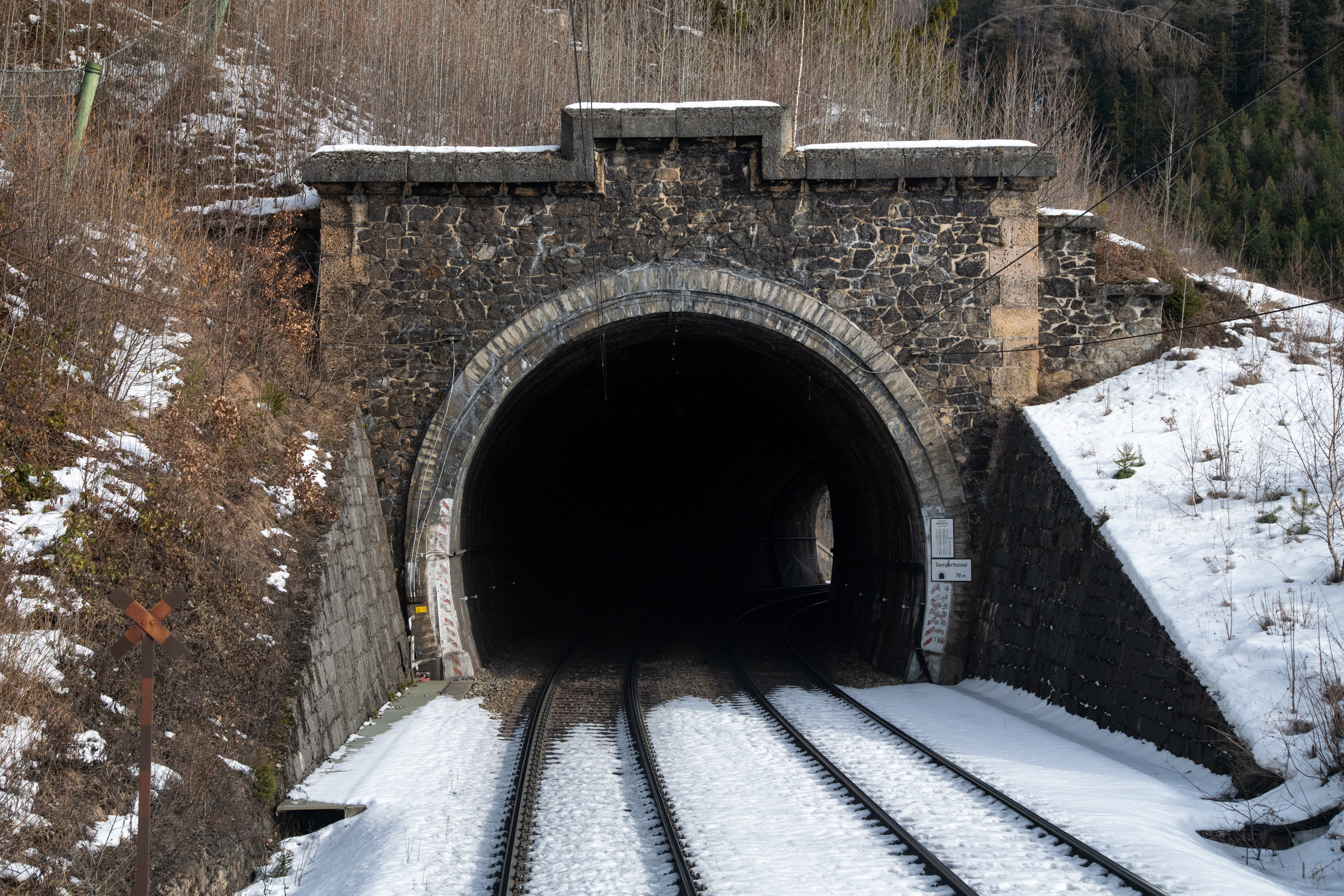
Gamperl

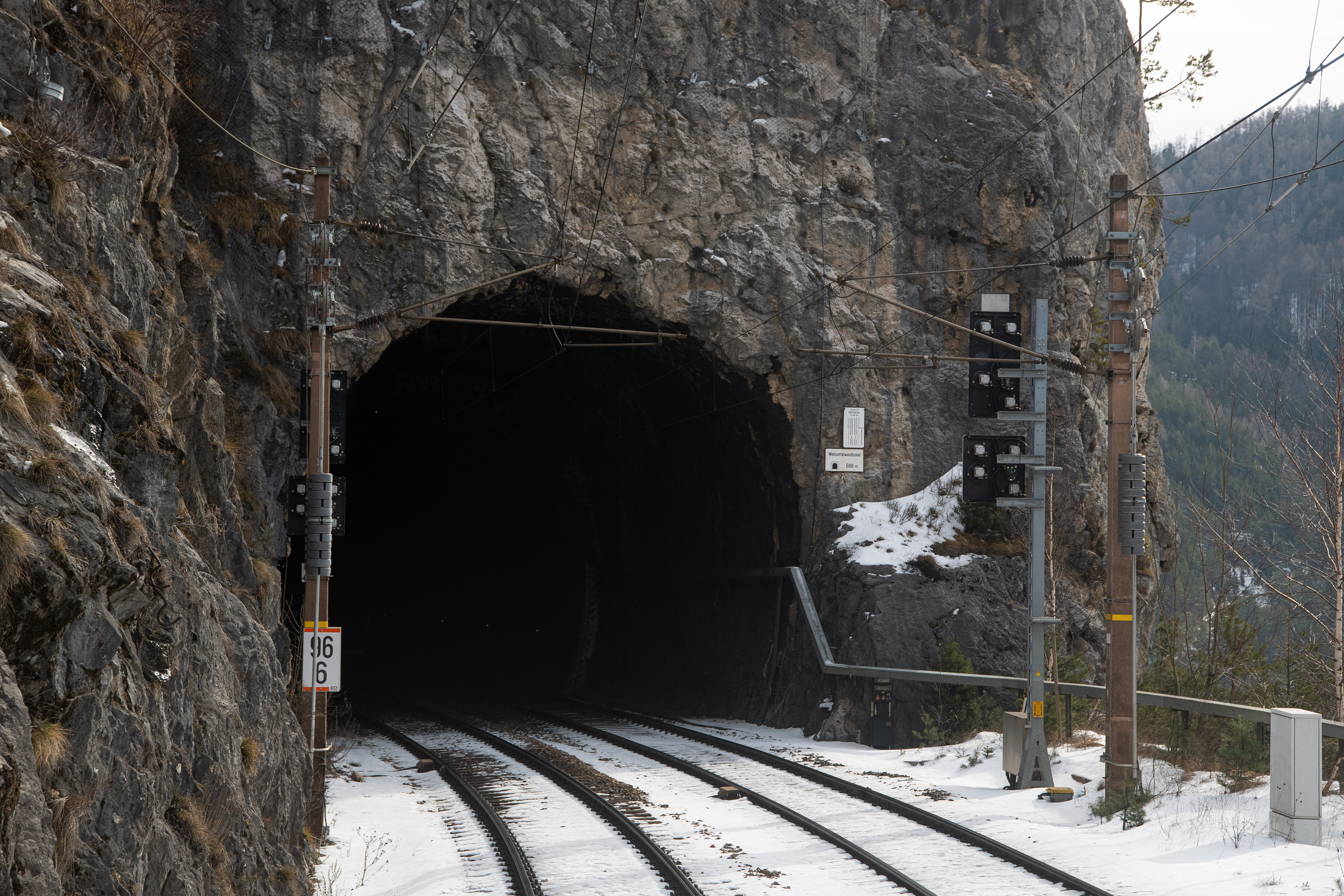
Weinzettelwand

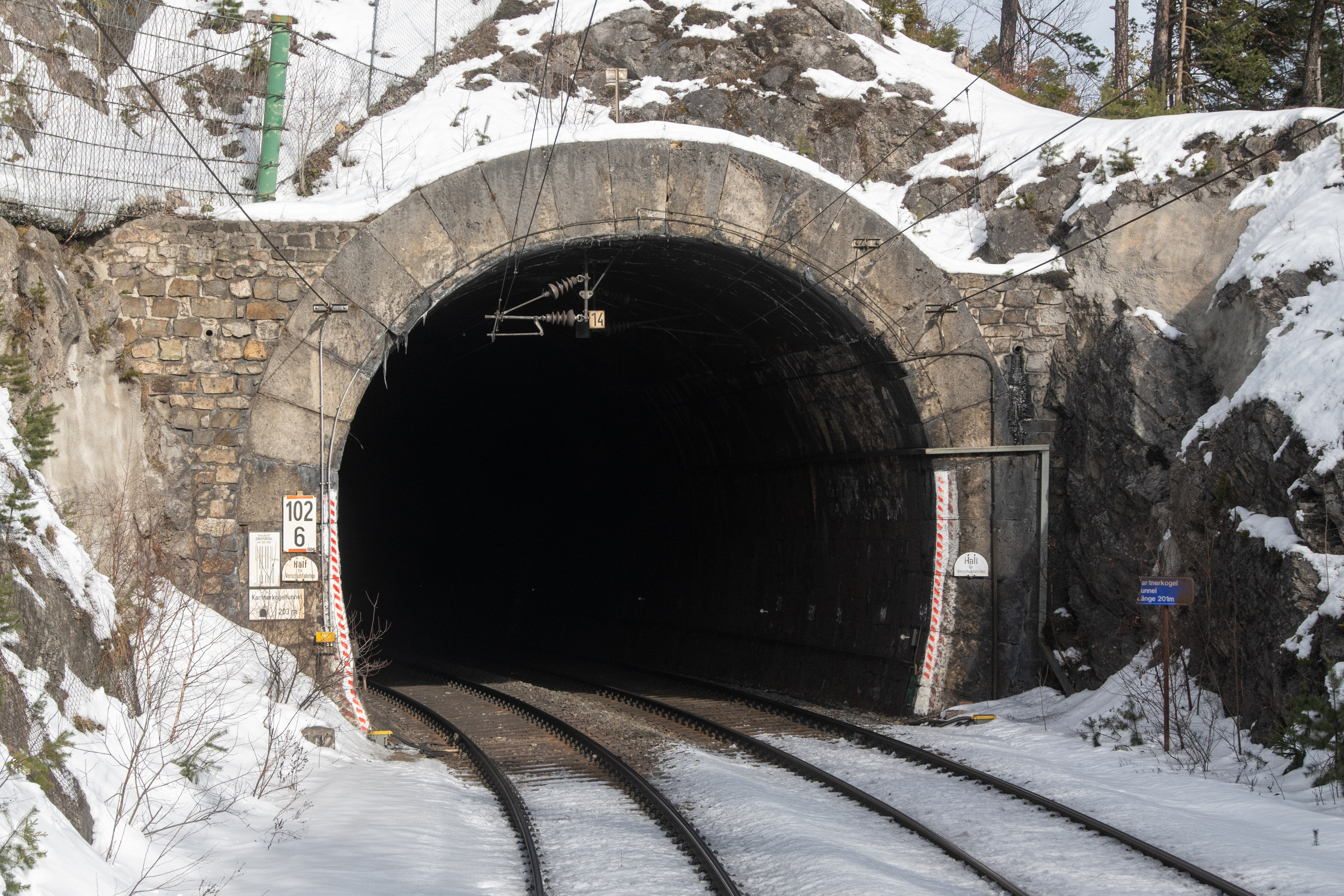
Kartnerkogel

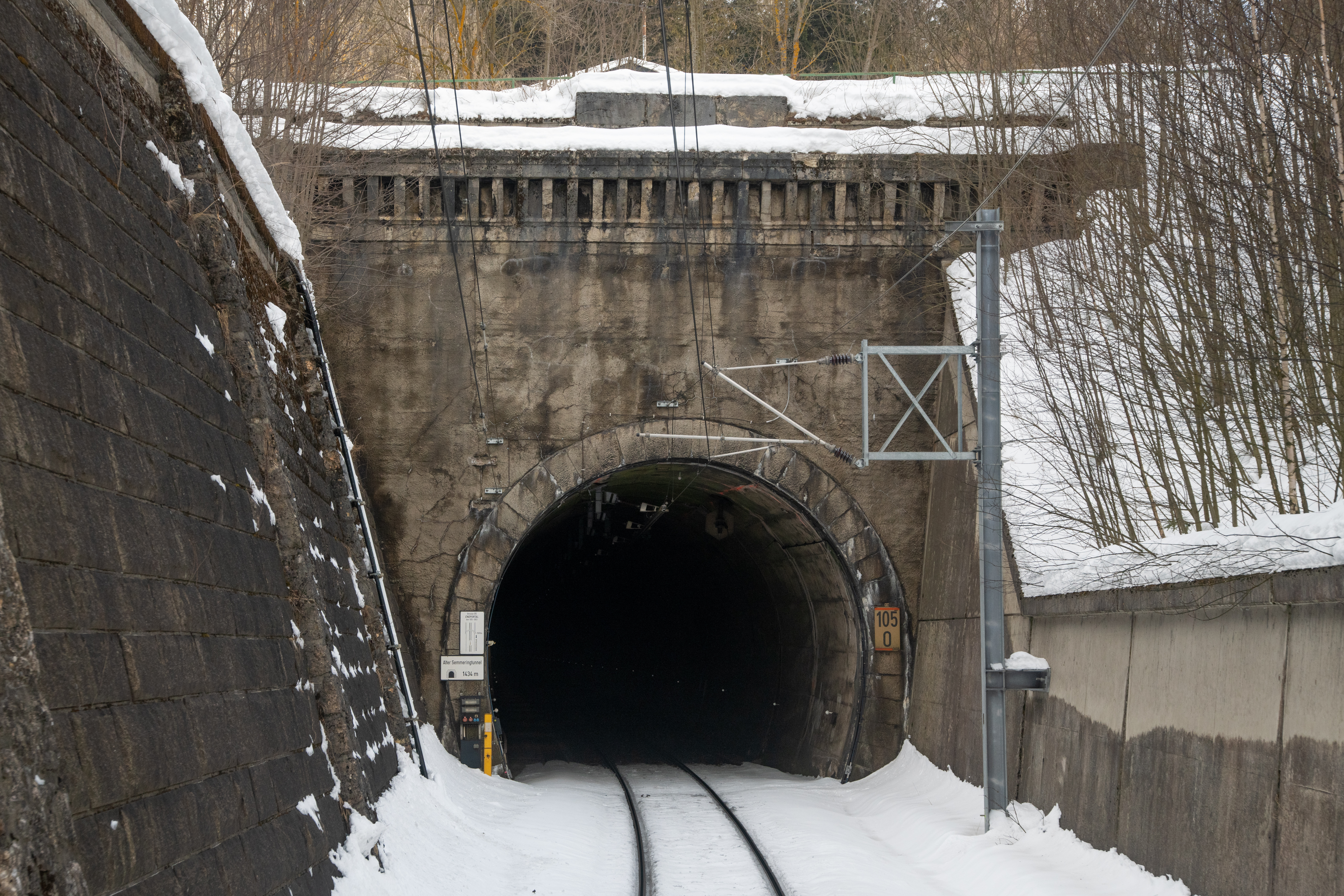
Semmering (Old)

== Locomotives ==
=== The Semmering trials ===
A competition was held in 1851 to decide which locomotives would be bought for operation on the Semmering Railway. One stretch of the line had gradients of 1 in 40 (2.5%) and curves with a minimum radius of 190 metres (210 yd) and a maximum radius of 285 metres (312 yd). A speed of 11.5 kilometres per hour (7.1 mph) was required to be maintained and a maximum axle loading of 14 tonnes (13.8 long tons; 15.4 short tons), with a boiler pressure not exceeding 8.5 kgf/cm^{2} (830 kPa; 121 psi).

=== Entrants ===
There were four entrants, Bavaria, built by Maffei; Neustadt built by Wiener Neustädter Lokomotivfabrik; Seraing built by Société anonyme John Cockerill in Belgium; and Vindobona built by the Locomotive Factory of Wien-Gloggnitzer Bahn in Vienna. All four locomotives fulfilled the conditions of the trial, but did not prove reliable in practice.

Semmering locomotives

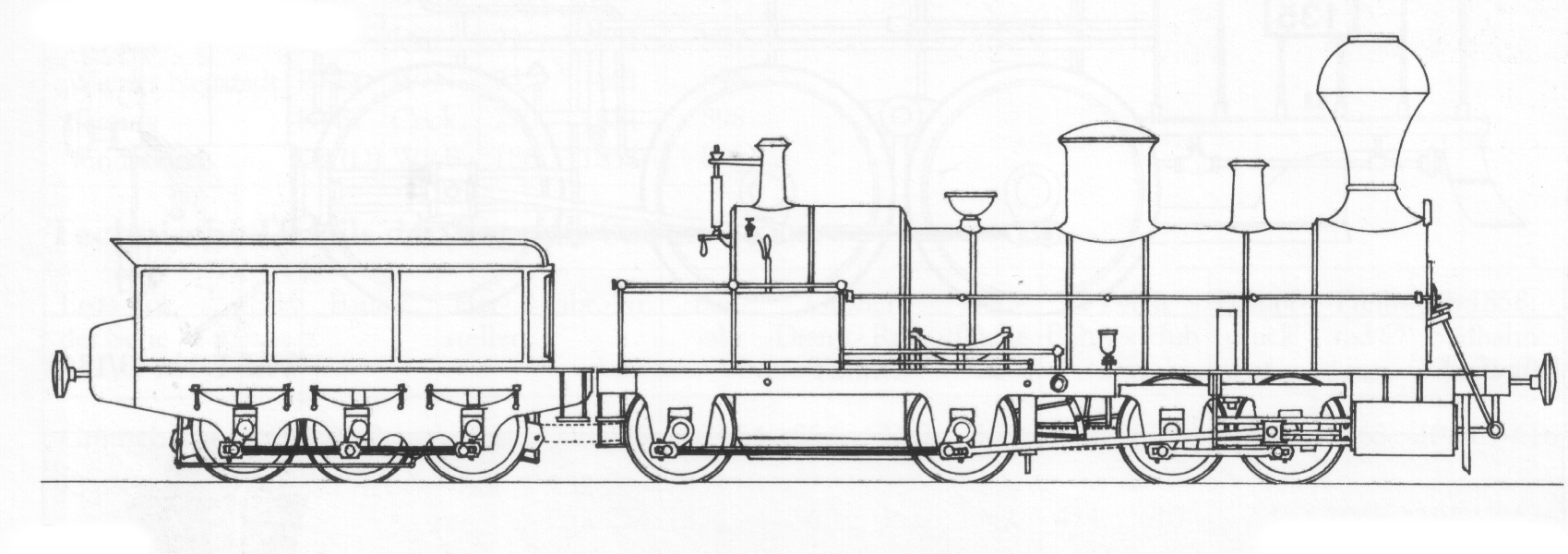
Bavaria

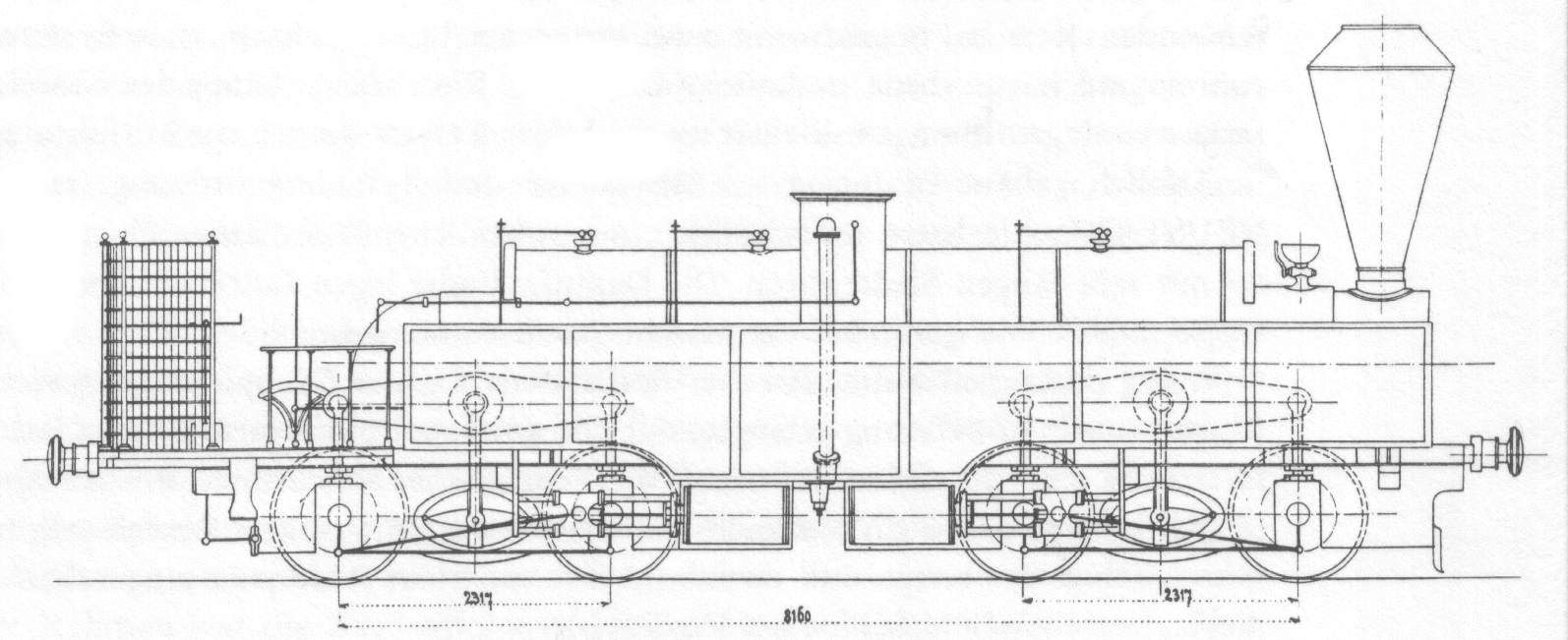
Neustadt

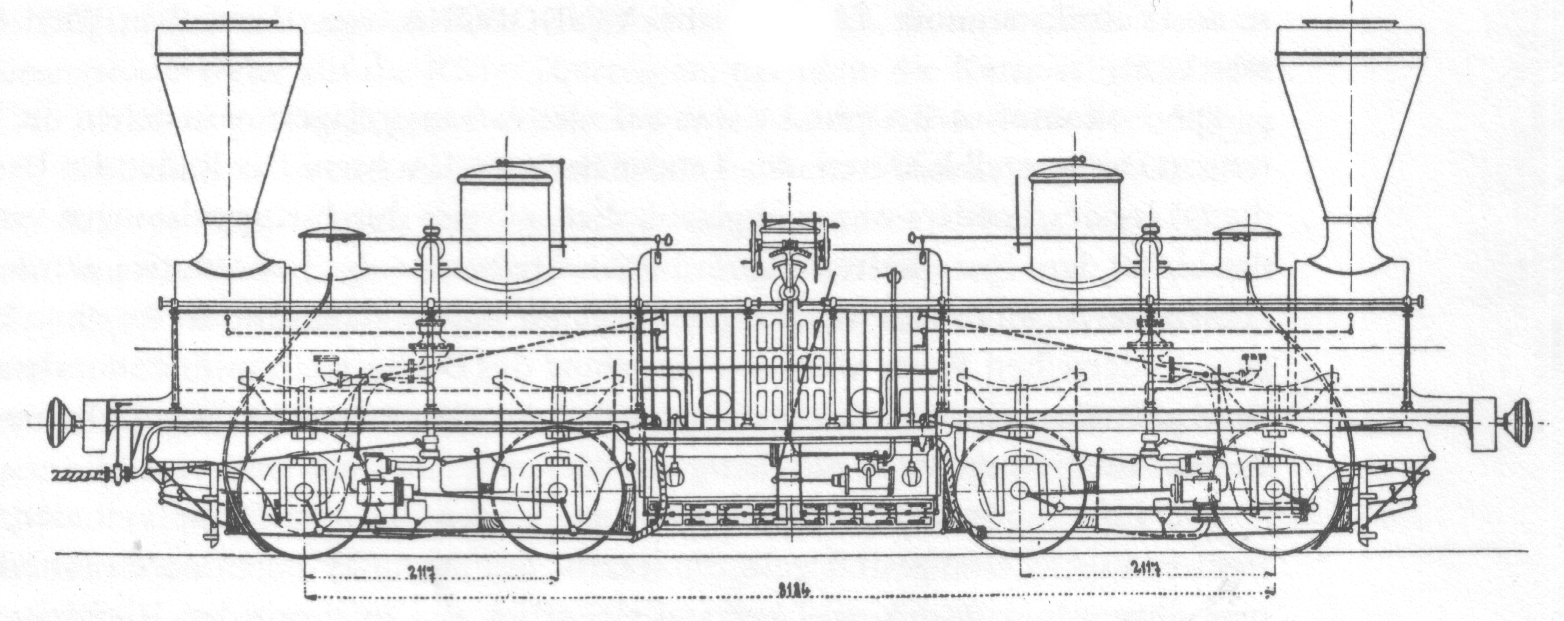
The "Seraing“ locomotive from an 1851 locomotive design. Note the similarity to a double Fairlie locomotive

=== Developments ===
The Semmering Trials led to a number of developments in locomotive design: Fairlie's Patent of 1863, the Meyer locomotive and the Mallet locomotive.

=== Engerth design ===
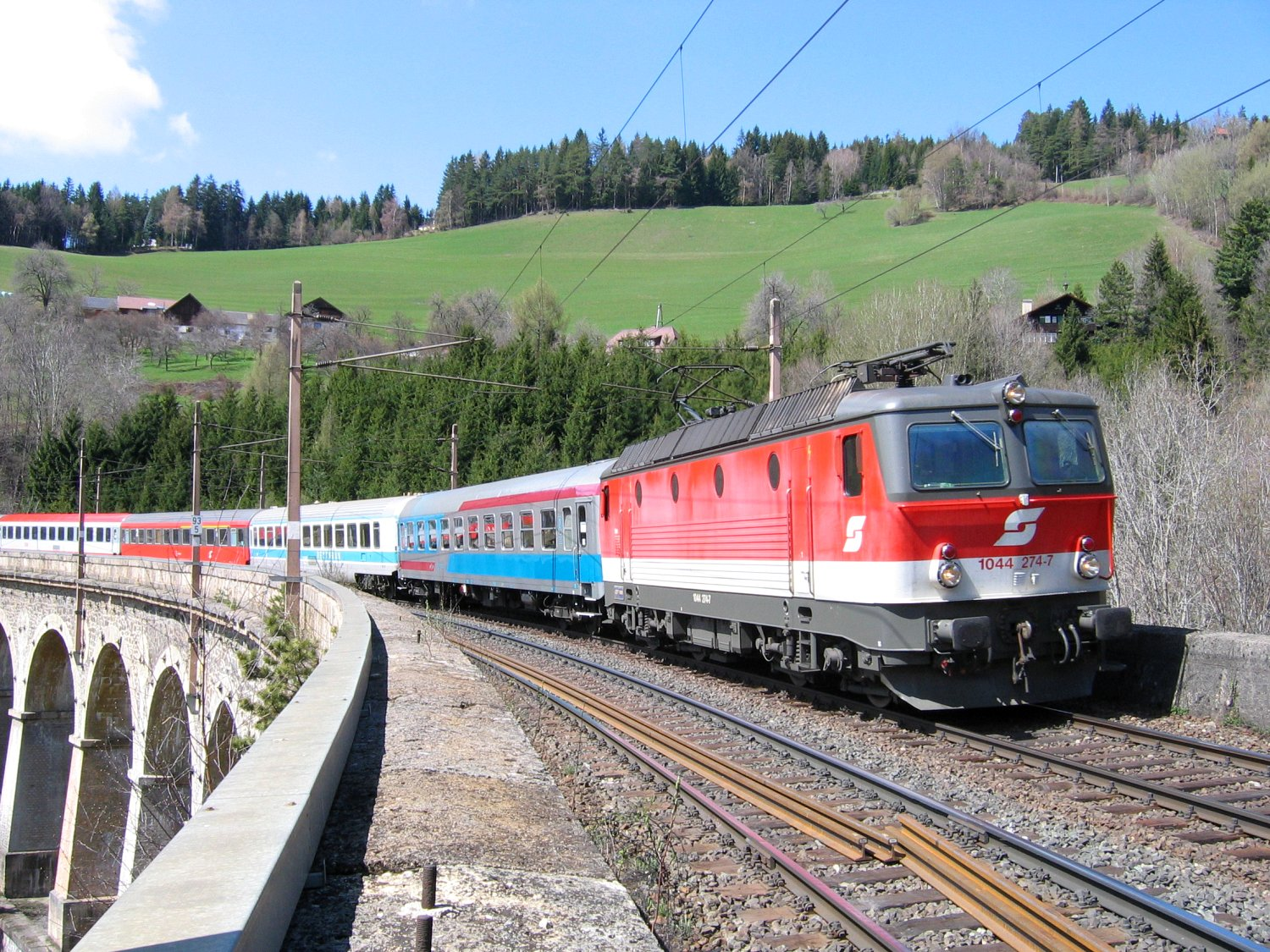
International express on the Semmeringbahn, pulled by 1044 274-7 (2004)

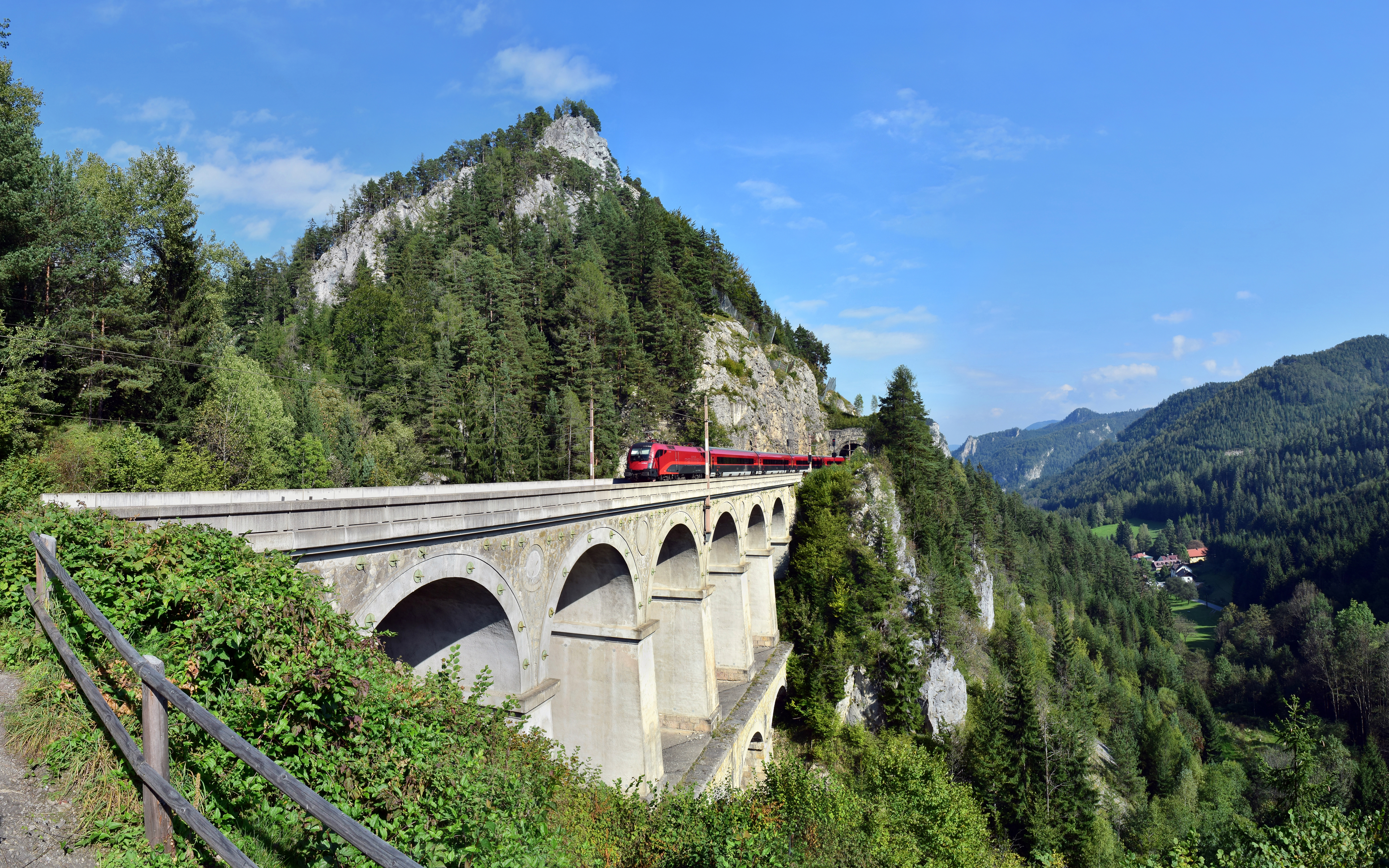

The Engerth design articulated the tender with the main locomotive frame, allowing some of the weight of the fuel and water to be carried on the driving wheels to improve adhesion. Because the tender was articulated, rather than directly attached to the frame, the locomotive could traverse relatively sharp curves, while still enjoying the advantage of the additional adhesive weight gain. The original design also included an indirect drive from the main driving wheels to the wheels under the tender. This arrangement proved too complex to maintain and was dropped from the design.

Sixteen locomotives were supplied to the Semmering Railway between November 1853 and May 1854. They proved capable of 19 kilometres per hour (12 mph) uphill on gradients of 1 in 40 (2.5%). An Engerth locomotive was featured on an Austrian stamp commemorating the 150th anniversary of the Semmering Railway in 2004. The Engerth locomotive also appeared on a 25 Euro coin issued by Austria in 2004.

=== Present day ===
Currently, the Semmering railway uses the well-known Siemens ES64U2 locomotives for this route as the main workhorse of the ÖBB. Starting with 1963 it also uses ÖBB class 1142 locomotives, now used as banking engines on the line, and also the ÖBB Class 1144 since 1977 as banking engines and also freight/passenger engines. In 1971 this is where a SJ Rc locomotive conducted trials that put the basis of the ÖBB Class 1043.

For local trains the Bombardier Talent (ÖBB Class 4024) and Siemens Desiro ML (ÖBB Class 4744) are used.

== Semmering Base Tunnel ==
On April 25, 2012, ground was broken for the construction of the 27.3 km Semmering base tunnel. This tunnel will bypass 41 km of the Semmeringbahn. The tunnel is expected to open in 2030, with a total cost of €3.9b.

== The Railway in numismatics ==
150 Years Semmering Alpine Railway Coin

The Semmering alpine railway has been the main motive for many collector coins and medals. One of the most famous and recent ones is the 150 Years Semmering Alpine Railway Coin. The obverse shows two locomotives: a historical and a modern one. The reverse of the coin shows a typical Semmering view. An Engerth steam locomotive just emerged from a tunnel crossing one of the distinctive viaducts.

The 1967 Austrian schilling note features the engineer on one side, and a Semmering scene (including one of the distinctive two-tier bridges) on the other.

== See also ==
- Culture of Austria
- List of World Heritage Sites in Austria
