= Semmering, Austria =

Semmering
- Municipality
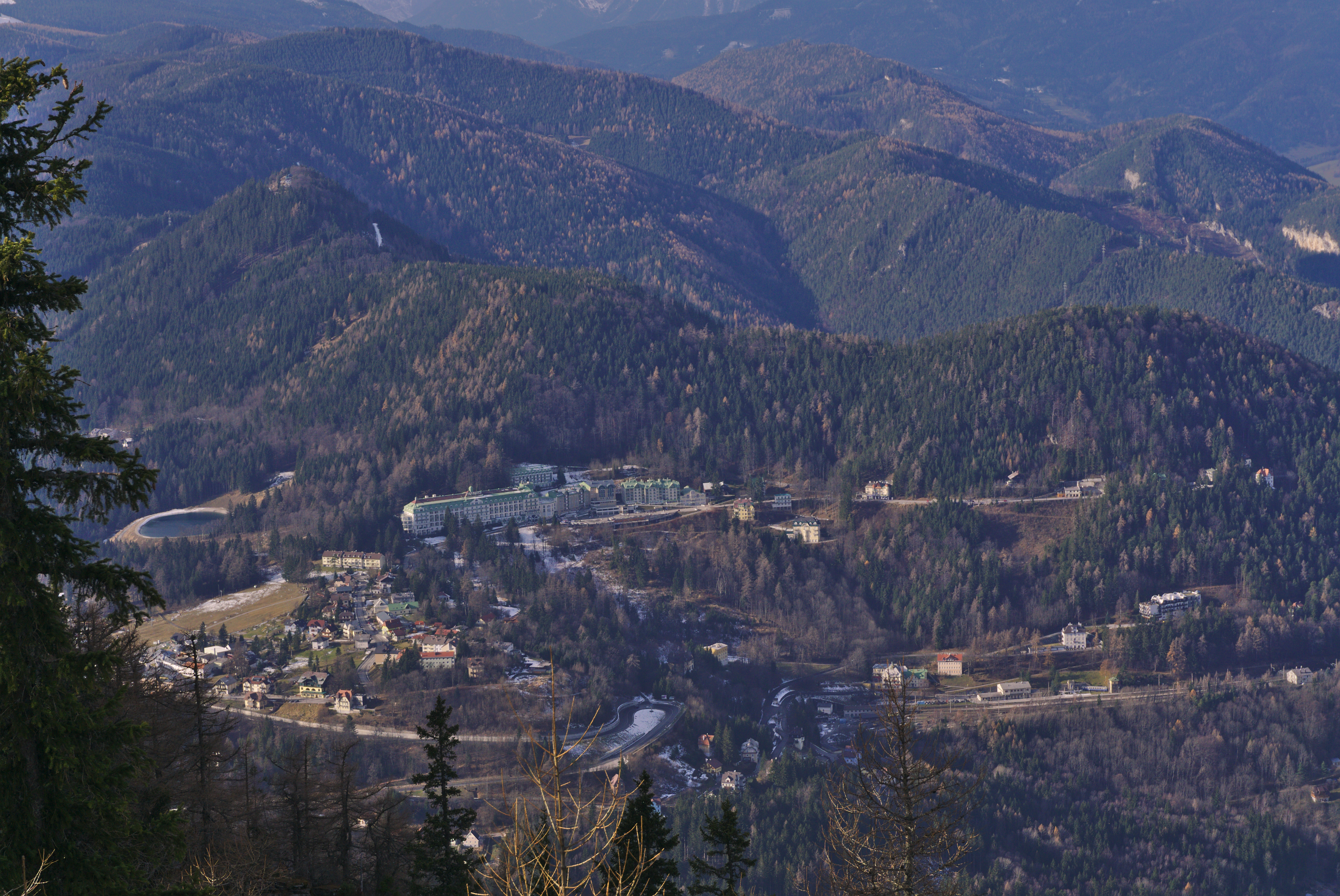
- Semmering panorama, November 2017

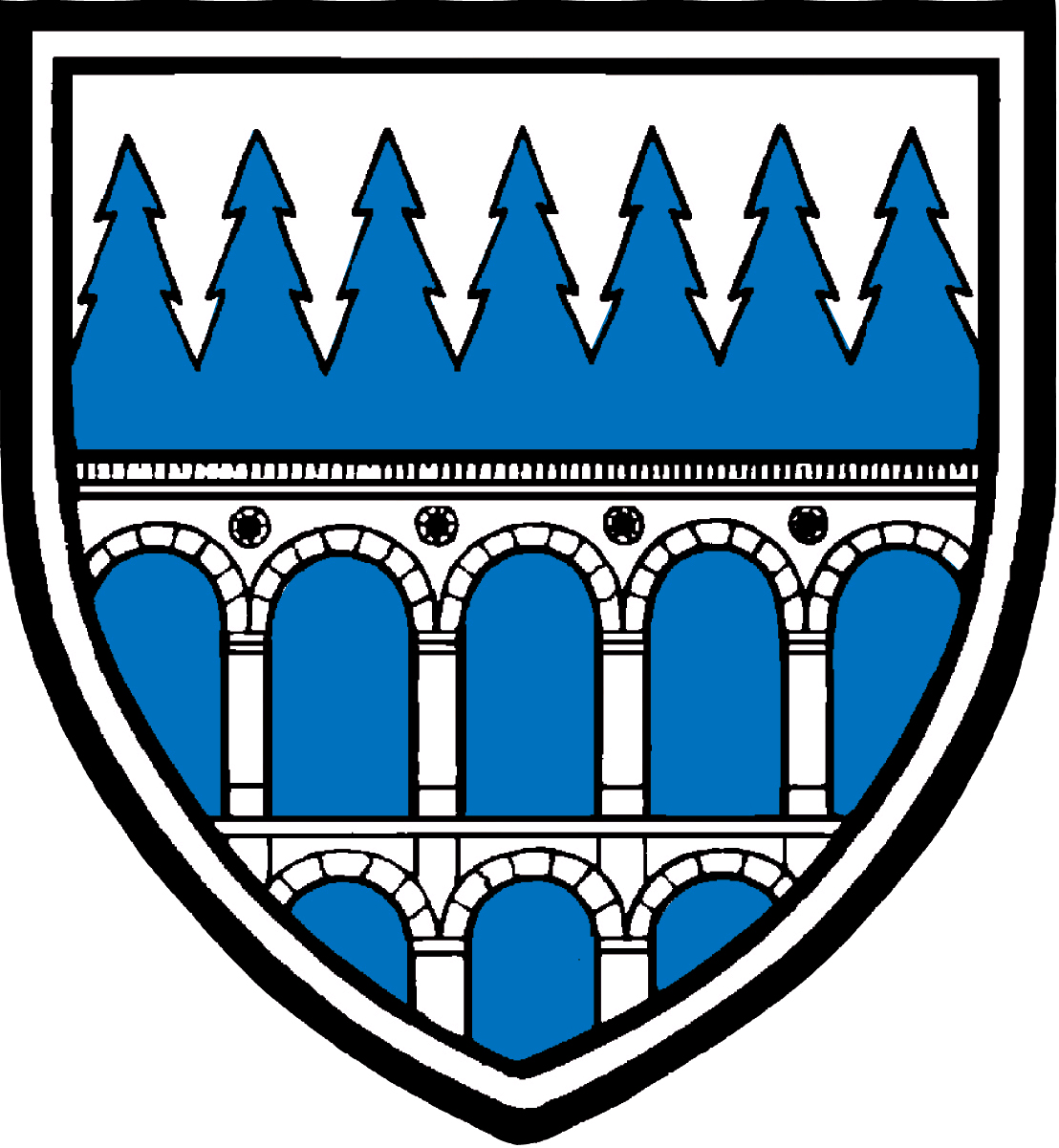
- Coat of arms

- Location within Austria
- Coordinates: 47°38′49″N 15°49′48″E
- Country: Austria
- State: Lower Austria
- District: Neunkirchen

Government
  - Mayor: Horst Schröttner (ÖVP)

Area
  - Total: 8.65 km^{2} (3.34 sq mi)
- Elevation: 950 m (3,120 ft)

Population (2018-01-01)
  - Total: 544
  - Density: 62.9/km^{2} (163/sq mi)
- Time zone: UTC+1 (CET)
  - Summer (DST): UTC+2 (CEST)
- Postal code: 2680
- Area code: 02664
- Website: www.semmering.at

Semmering is a town in the district of Neunkirchen in the Austrian state of Lower Austria. It is noted for its skiing, and has hosted the Alpine skiing World Cup several times. When the Semmering Railway was completed in 1854, the town quickly became a popular tourist getaway in winter months. In 2011, the town had a permanent population of 571.

== Population ==
Historical population
Year	Pop.	±%
1869	135	—
1880	154	+14.1%
1890	245	+59.1%
1900	591	+141.2%
1910	1,398	+136.5%
1923	1,816	+29.9%
1934	1,742	−4.1%
1939	1,428	−18.0%
1951	1,374	−3.8%
1961	1,313	−4.4%
1971	1,016	−22.6%
1981	819	−19.4%
1991	730	−10.9%
2001	610	−16.4%
2011	571	−6.4%

== Resort ==
=== History of the resort ===
At the turn of the 19th and 20th centuries, wealthy Viennese society discovered the Semmering as a nearby summer resort-destination.

The town was revived with the construction of the Semmering Railway, which opened 1854.

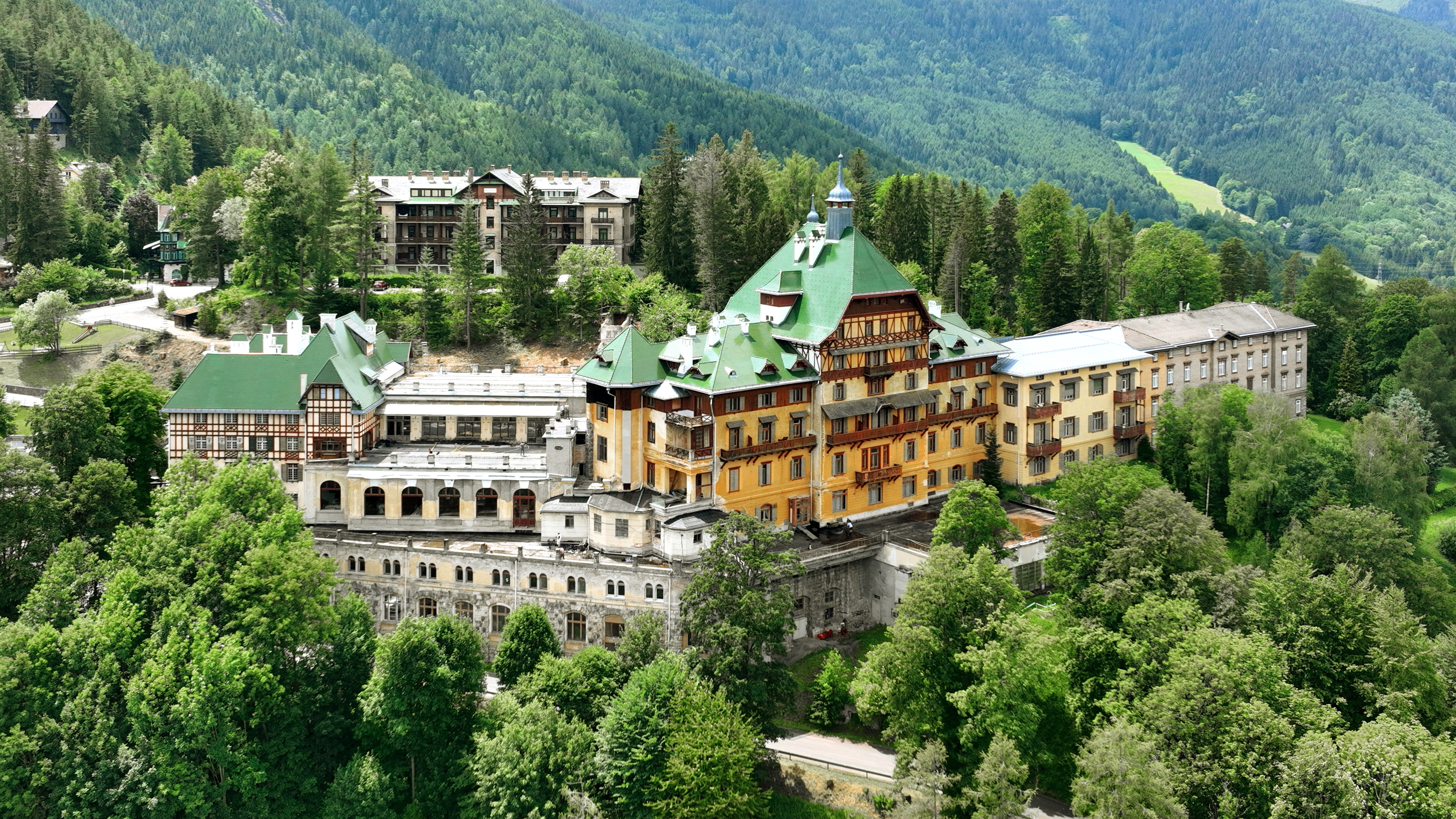
Südbahnhotel, built 1882

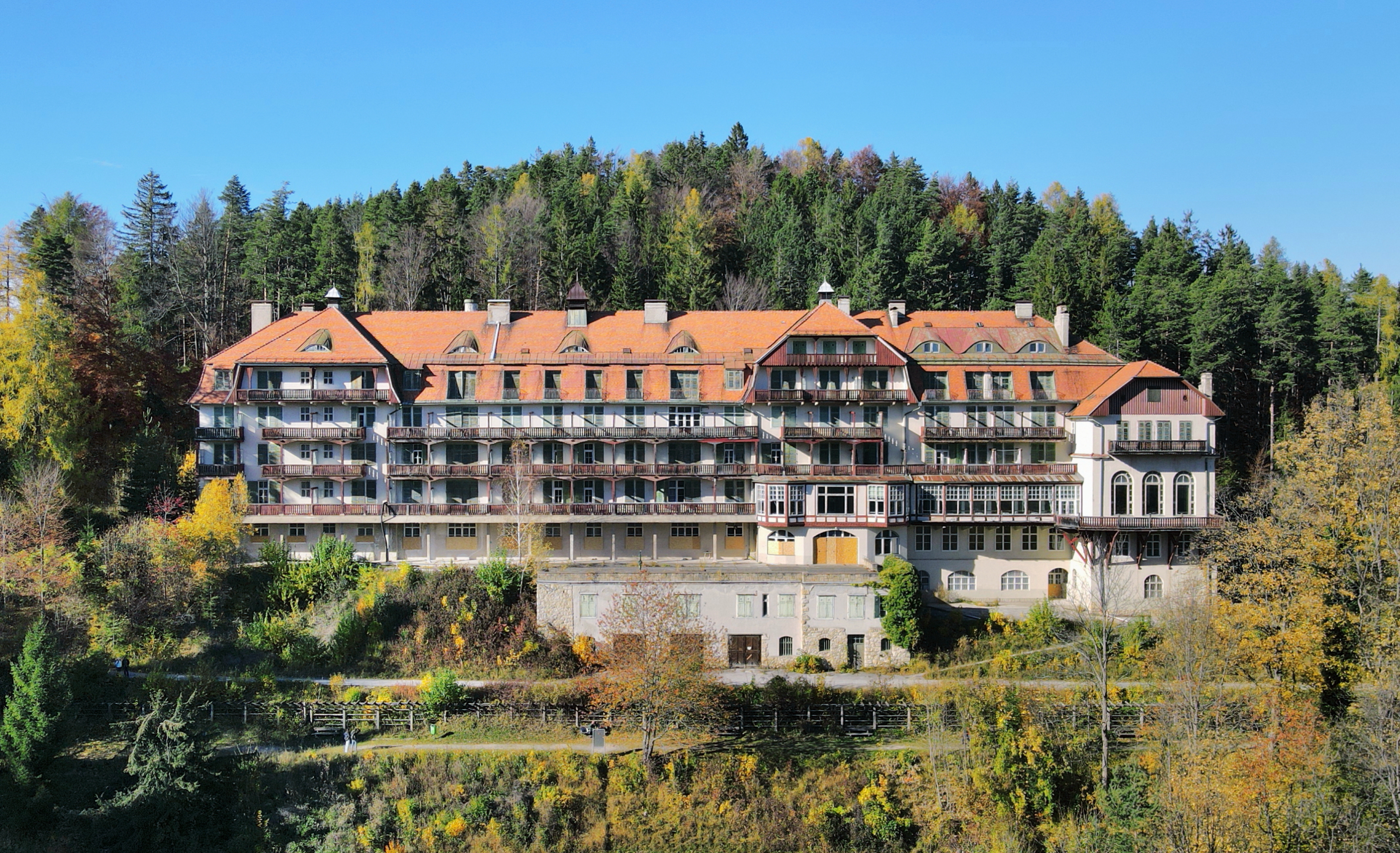
Kurhotel, built 1909

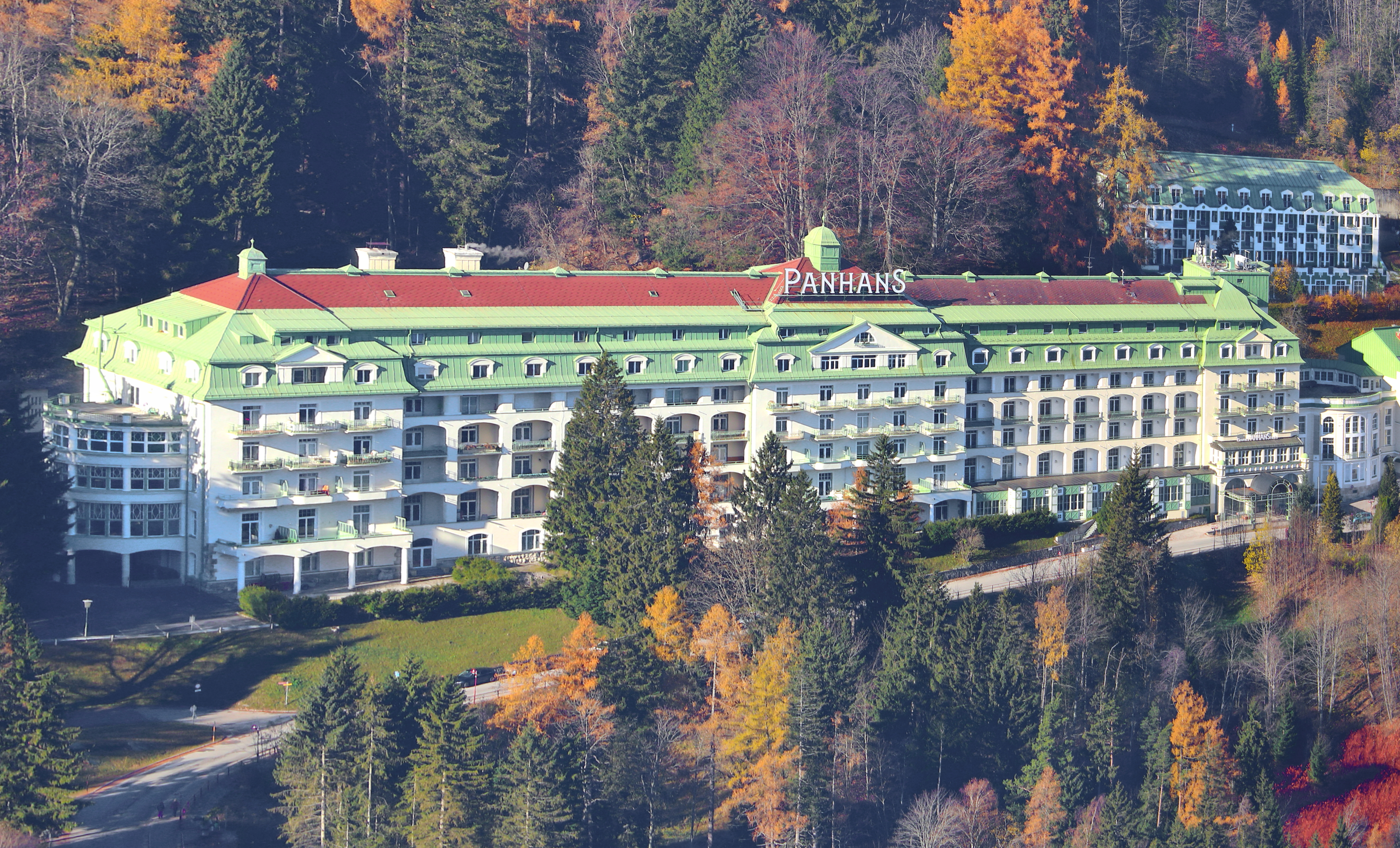
Hotel Panhans, built 1888 (1913)

=== Location ===
Semmering is located on the border of Lower Austria and Styria at an elevation of 1,000 m (3,280 ft) above sea level and surrounded with forest. Semmering city is located in Neunkirchen, about 100 km (60 mi) from Vienna.

=== Winter season ===
As usual, winter season starts in December and lasts until mid-April. The Semmering resort in winter is a ski village with:

- 14 km slopes for daytime skiing (3 out of them for beginners, 10 - intermediate, 1 - black)
- 13 km slopes for night skiing (Semmering has one of the best lighting system in Europe)
- 12 km slopes available for racing ski
- toboggan run of 3 km
- Split Park
- Vertical height up to 400 metres (1,300 ft).
- Semmering is famous for its alpine skiing, and has hosted the World Cup races several times.
- Semmering railway was listed as World Heritage Site of UNESCO in 2005.

== Sports ==
Semmering has hosted FIS Alpine Skiing World Cup competitions several times, sometimes during evenings in illuminated slopes. The events have usually attracted many spectators.
