= Kearney micropolitan area, Nebraska =

Kearney micropolitan area
- Micropolitan Statistical Area
- Kearney, NE Micropolitan Statistical Area
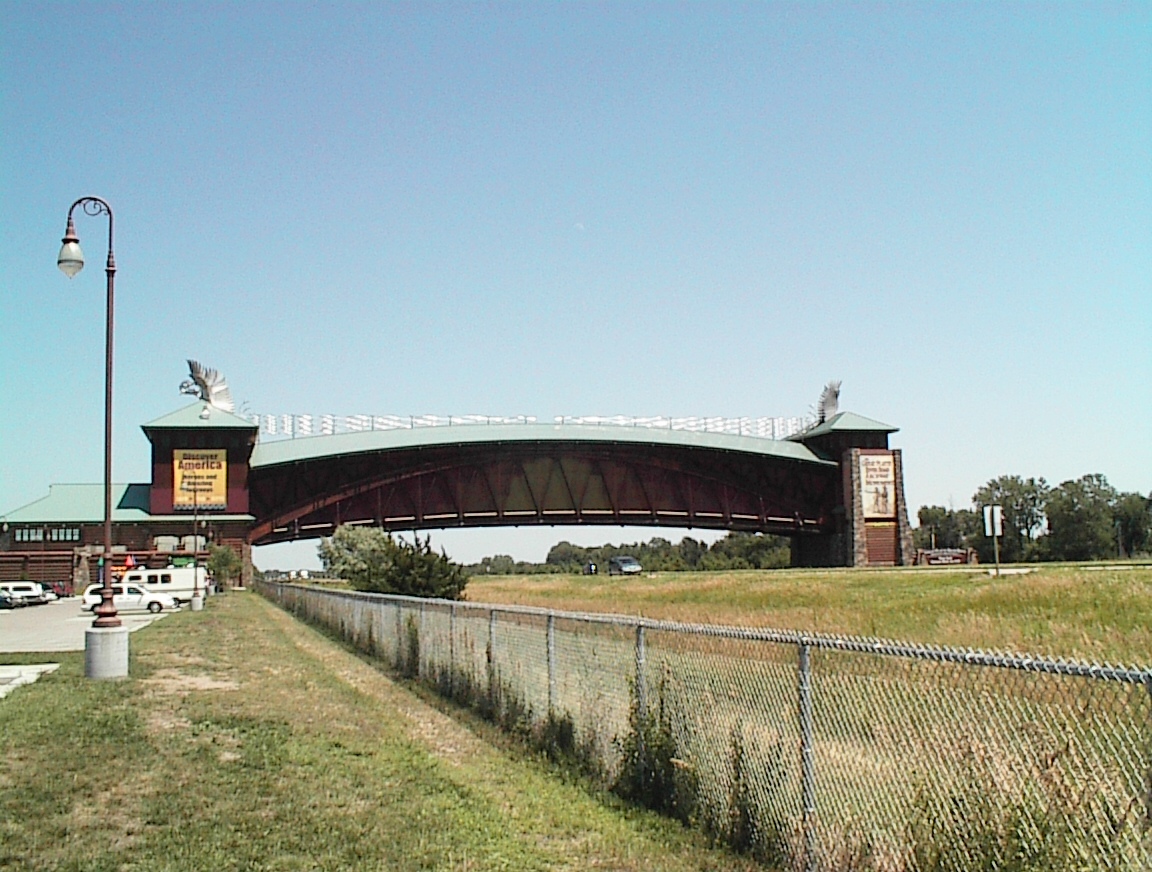
- The Great Platte River Road Archway Monument, which spans Interstate 80
Interactive Map of Kearney, NE μSA
City of Kearney
Kearney, NE μSA
Holdrege, NE μSA
- Country: United States
- State: Nebraska
- Largest city: Kearney
- Time zone: UTC−6 (CST)
  - Summer (DST): UTC−5 (CDT)

The Kearney Micropolitan Statistical Area, as defined by the United States Census Bureau, is an area consisting of two counties in Nebraska, anchored by the city of Kearney.

As of the 2010 census, the area had a population of 52,591 (though a July 1, 2011 estimate placed the population at 53,278).

== Counties ==
- Buffalo
- Kearney

== Communities ==
- Places with 25,000 or more inhabitants
  - Kearney (Principal City)
- Places with 1,000 to 5,000 inhabitants
  - Gibbon
  - Holdrege
  - Minden
  - Ravenna
  - Shelton
- Places with 500 to 1,000 inhabitants
  - Axtell
  - Bertrand
  - Elm Creek
- Places with less than 500 inhabitants
  - Amherst
  - Atlanta
  - Funk
  - Heartwell
  - Loomis
  - Miller
  - Norman
  - Pleasanton
  - Riverdale
  - Wilcox
- Unincorporated places
  - Buda
  - Keene
  - Lowell
  - Newark

== Townships ==
- Anderson
- Armada
- Beaver
- Blaine
- Cedar
- Center (Buffalo County)
- Center (Phelps County)
- Cherry Creek
- Collins
- Cosmo
- Cottonwood
- Divide (Buffalo County)
- Divide (Phelps County)
- Eaton
- Elm Creek
- Gardner
- Garfield (Buffalo County)
- Garfield (Phelps County)
- Gibbon
- Grant (Buffalo County)
- Grant (Kearney County)
- Harrison
- Hayes
- Industry-Rock Falls
- Laird
- Lake
- Liberty

- Lincoln
- Logan (Buffalo County)
- Logan (Kearney County)
- Loup
- Lowell
- May
- Mirage
- Newark
- Odessa
- Oneida
- Platte
- Prairie
- Riverdale
- Rusco
- Sartoria
- Schneider
- Scott
- Sharon
- Shelton
- Sheridan
- Sherman
- Thornton
- Union
- Valley
- Westmark
- Westside
- Williamsburg

== Demographics ==
As of the census of 2000, there were 49,141 people, 18,573 households, and 12,129 families residing within the μSA. The racial makeup of the μSA was 95.55% White, 0.49% African American, 0.31% Native American, 0.62% Asian, 0.03% Pacific Islander, 2.03% from other races, and 0.98% from two or more races. Hispanic or Latino of any race were 4.34% of the population.

The median income for a household in the μSA was $38,015, and the median income for a family was $45,562. Males had a median income of $30,085 versus $21,029 for females. The per capita income for the μSA was $17,814.

== Future development ==
Today, some area officials are proposing to upgrade to a metropolitan area with the addition of Phelps County in the future.

== See also ==
- Nebraska census statistical areas
