= Tornado outbreak of June 18–22, 2011 =

Weather event in the United States

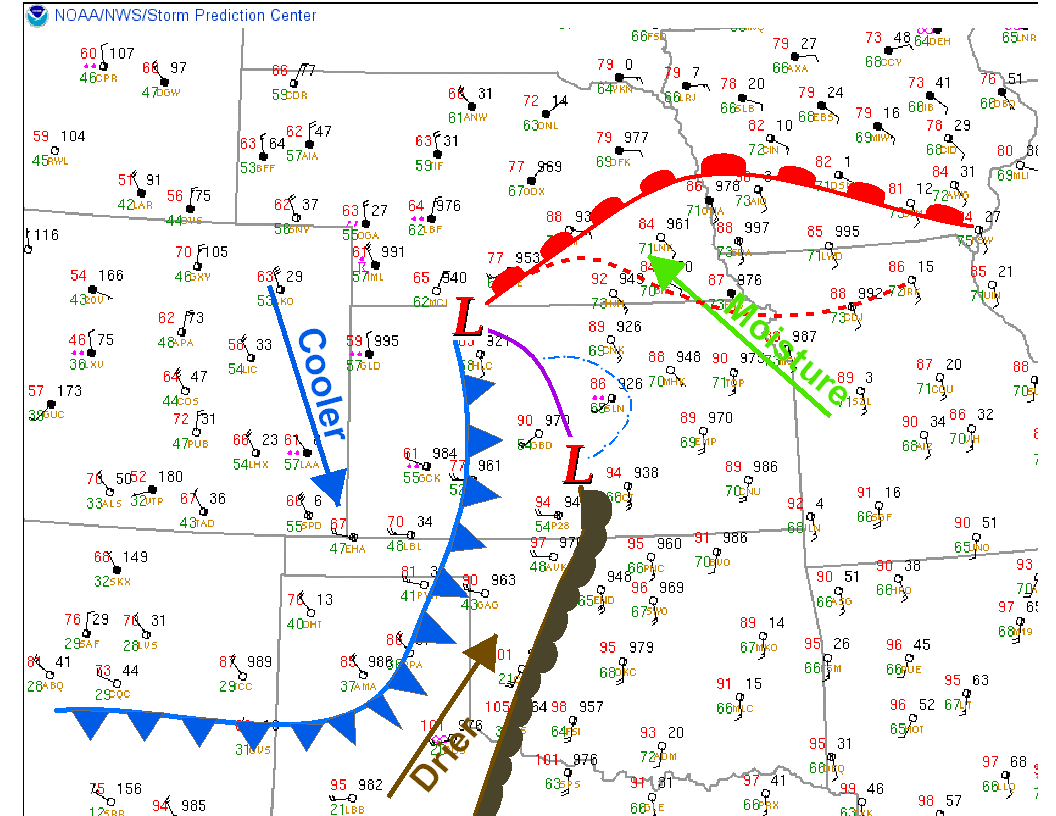
- Surface weather map of the central Great Plains on June 20, depicting low-pressure systems and storm fronts.

Meteorological history
- Duration: June 18–22, 2011

Tornado outbreak
- Tornadoes: 78
- Max. rating: EF3 tornado
- Duration: 4 days
- Highest winds: Tornadic – 160 mph (260 km/h) (EF3 near Amherst, Nebraska on June 20)
- Highest gusts: Non-tornadic – 78 kn (90 mph; 144 km/h) (Three locations on June 18–20)

Overall effects
- Injuries: 4
- Damage: $44 million (2011 USD)
- Areas affected: Great Plains, Midwest, Central United States
- Part of the tornado outbreaks of 2011

On June 18–22, 2011, a large and damaging tornado outbreak produced widespread tornado activity across much of the Midwest and Central U.S. The most intense activity occurred on June 20, when multiple supercell thunderstorms produced numerous tornadoes across the Great Plains. Some of these tornadoes were large and intense, but for the most part only affected rural areas. The strongest of these tornadoes impacted Kansas and Nebraska. Another notable event occurred on June 22, when a series of 5 tornadoes struck the Louisville metropolitan area. One of these tornadoes caused severe damage at the famous Churchill Downs racetrack. Despite the number and intensity of some of the tornadoes, the outbreak caused no fatalities.

== Meteorological synopsis ==
On June 18, a total of 11 tornadoes touched down across the Great Plains and Midwest. These tornadoes were mostly weak or remained over open country. The worst of the damage was to trees and outbuildings.

On June 19, the Storm Prediction Center issued a moderate risk of severe weather for the Central Plains. By the evening, several tornadoes had touched down over rural areas. Most of these tornadoes were weak. However, an EF2 tornado caused significant damage near Cherryville, Missouri, and injured 3 people. Another EF2 tornado also caused considerable damage in Breckinridge County, Kentucky as well. An EF1 tornado caused severe damage south of Du Quoin, Illinois and injured 1 person.

During the afternoon of June 20, a particularly dangerous situation (PDS) tornado watch was issued for much of central Nebraska and north-central Kansas due to the threat of significant tornadoes. Additionally, very large hail, at least 4 in (10 cm) in diameter, was expected within the watch area. Around 1:00 p.m. local time, storm chasers reported a large EF3 tornado on the ground north of Hill City, Kansas and again later that afternoon near Elm Creek, Nebraska. Numerous other tornadoes were reported across the region including near Ravenna and in York County, some reported to have been very large and intense, but mostly over open country. However, some of the tornadoes impacted numerous rural farmsteads, and caused severe damage. Several of these tornadoes reached EF3 intensity. Tornado warnings stretched from North Dakota to Kansas. Additionally, a major derecho event developed farther south – a PDS Severe Thunderstorm Watch was issued for parts of Oklahoma and North Texas as well. On June 21, tornado watches were issued for several areas, including central Minnesota and Wisconsin, southern Illinois and parts of Missouri, and lower Michigan. Tornadoes were reported in Anoka County, Minnesota, and Green Lake and Fond du Lac Counties in Wisconsin. Several tornadoes touched down across the area, causing mostly minor damage. Additionally, local law enforcement reported a tornado in Allegan County in Michigan, with photos taken also showing what looked like a tornado, but no damage was seen in the area, and the National Weather Service determined it to have been low hanging clouds. Meanwhile, a major derecho event impacted the Chicago Metropolitan Area. The worst damage was in Wheeling, Illinois. A tornado touched down in Downers Grove, Illinois

A series of tornadoes tracked across the Louisville, Kentucky area late on June 22. A total of five tornadoes were confirmed in the area, including two that were rated EF2. One of the tornadoes directly hit Churchill Downs racetrack severely damaging several buildings on the site. Other significant damage was reported in several industrial parks in the metropolitan area with buildings heavily damaged. A few other tornadoes caused minor damage in Indiana, Tennessee, Mississippi, and Michigan.

== Tornadoes ==
Confirmed tornadoes by Enhanced Fujita rating
EFU	EF0	EF1	EF2	EF3	EF4	EF5	Total
0	43	21	9	5	0	0	78

=== June 18 event ===
List of reported tornadoes – Saturday, June 18, 2011
EF#	Location	County	Coord.	Time (UTC)	Path Length	Comments/Damage
Oklahoma
EF0	W of Hulah	Osage	36.93°N 96.16°W	0125		Tornado lasted for 10 to 15 minutes over an open field, producing no known damage.
EF0	E of Copan	Washington	36.54°N 95.52°W	unknown		Brief tornado remained over open country with no damage.
EF0	E of Grainola	Osage	36.57°N 96.33°W	unknown		Brief tornado remained over open country with no damage.
EF0	SW of Boulangerville	Osage	36.55°N 96.17°W	unknown		Brief tornado remained over open country with no damage.
Missouri
EF0	SE of Brighton	Polk, Greene	37.42°N 93.32°W	0503	3 mi (4.8 km)	A metal barn was destroyed, a home had minor siding damage and several trees were felled.
EF1	NE of Everton	Dade, Greene	37.22°N 93.37°W	0435	11 mi (18 km)	Numerous trees were snapped and uprooted.
EF1	SE of Dadeville	Dade, Polk	37.27°N 93.37°W	Unknown	6 mi (9.7 km)	Numerous trees were snapped and uprooted and outbuildings were destroyed.
Colorado
EF0	NE of Wild Horse	Cheyenne	38.54°N 102.57°W	unknown	unknown	Tornado remained over open fields with no damage.
EF0	SW of Firstview	Cheyenne	38.46°N 102.34°W	unknown	unknown	Tornado remained over open fields with no damage.
Kansas
EF0	SW of Gove	Gove	38.51°N 100.3°W	unknown	unknown	Tornado remained over open fields with no damage.
Nebraska
EF0	W of Mitchell	Scotts Bluff	41.57°N 103.51°W	unknown	unknown	Tornado remained over open fields with no damage.
Sources: SPC Storm Reports for 06/18/11

=== June 19 event ===
List of reported tornadoes – Sunday, June 19, 2011
EF#	Location	County	Coord.	Time (UTC)	Path length	Comments/Damage
Missouri
EF0	W of Cherryville (1st tornado)	Crawford		0700	0.75 mi (1.21 km)	Extensive tree damage occurred.
EF2	W of Cherryville (2nd tornado)	Crawford		0710	3.1 mi (5.0 km)	Numerous trees snapped and uprooted along the path. Two homes were also damaged, one of which lost a significant portion of its roof and parts of the walls. Support beams were found up to 0.75 mi (1.21 km) from the home. Three people inside the home sustained minor injuries.
EF0	NW of Westboro	Atchison		unknown	1 mi (1.6 km)	Tornado remained over open country with no damage.
Kentucky
EF2	S of Harned	Breckinridge	37.75°N 86.42°W	1139	1 mi (1.6 km)	A house sustained significant roof damage and two barns were heavily damaged. Trees were uprooted and snapped. Power poles were pushed over and sheet metal was found thrown up to 300 yards as well.
EF0	SE of Harned	Breckinridge	37.73°N 86.40°W	1142	0.1 mi (160 m)	Brief tornado damaged a barn.
Indiana
EF0	S of Sulphur Springs	Perry	38.19°N 86.50°W	1531	0.2 mi (320 m)	Brief tornado uprooted several trees
Wisconsin
EF0	S of Theresa	Dodge	43.45°N 88.45°W	2156	Unknown	Brief tornado flattened grass in a swirl pattern and snapped tree limbs.
Kansas
EF0	E of Woodbine	Morris	38.80°N 96.90°W	0112	Unknown	Brief touchdown with no damage. Tornado lasted less than one minute.
Colorado
EF0	NW of Sedgwick	Sedgwick		unknown	unknown	Brief tornado over open country with no damage.
Iowa
EF0	E of Rake	Winnebago		unknown	unknown	Landspout tornado over open country with no damage. Tornado was very slow moving.
Illinois
EF1	S of Du Quion	Perry	37.59°N 89.15°W	unknown	3 mi (4.8 km)	Tornado struck the Du Quion State Fairgrounds and caused severe damage. Multiple trees were snapped and uprooted in the area, some of which landed on a shower/restroom building and the Farm Service Building, destroying them both. Several RV's were flipped or demolished, in one of which 3 people were trapped and required rescue. An arena building sustained damage to its doors and had air conditioning units torn from its roof. Several nearby homes had shingles torn off and sustained damage from falling trees. Uprooted trees ruptured gas lines in the area as well. One person was injured.
Nebraska
EF0	NW of Max(1st tornado)	Dundy		unknown	3 mi (4.8 km)	Tornado damaged the roof of a barn and overturned an irrigation pivot.
EF0	NW of Max(2nd tornado)	Dundy		unknown	2 mi (3.2 km)	Tornado remained over open country with no damage.
EF0	N of Perry	Red Willow		unknown	3 mi (4.8 km)	Large dusty tornado remained over open country with no damage.
Sources: SPC Storm Reports for 06/18/11 and 06/19/11

=== June 20 event ===
List of reported tornadoes – Monday, June 20, 2011
EF#	Location	County	Coord.	Time (UTC)	Path length	Comments/Damage
Iowa
EF1	New Sharon area	Mahaska	41.47°N 92.65°W	1005	0.5 mi (800 m)	A modular building was mostly destroyed and a few gravestones were toppled in a cemetery. Numerous trees were downed, some of which landed on homes. Power poles were downed as well and cars were pushed over into a ditch.
EF0	NW of Kingsley	Plymouth	42.67°N 96.08°W	0240	1 mi (1.6 km)	Numerous farm buildings and grain bins were damaged
EF1	SW of Moorhead	Monona	42.00°N 95.54°W	unknown	7 mi (11 km)	Numerous trees and power lines were downed. One farm house lost section of its roof. A grain bin and several outbuildings were destroyed as well.
EF1	NW of St. Joseph	Kossuth	42.57°N 97.19°W	unknown	1 mi (1.6 km)	One home was badly damaged and grain bins were destroyed. Trees were downed as well.
Illinois
EF1	SE of Bonfield	Kankakee	41.13°N 88.03°W	1114	2.5 mi (4.0 km)	Numerous trees were snapped or uprooted, causing severe damage to several homes. One outbuilding was destroyed.
Kansas
EF0	SE of Quinter	Gove		1755	1 mi (1.6 km)	Dusty tornado remained over open fields with no damage.
EF0	NNE of Quinter	Gove		1800	3 mi (4.8 km)	Tornado remained over open country with no damage.
EF0	WNW of St. Peter	Graham		1812	5 mi (8.0 km)	Tornado remained over open country with no damage.
EF3	NNW of Hill City (1st tornado)	Graham, Norton	39.50°N 99.85°W	1854	11 mi (18 km)	Large wedge tornado produced severe damage in the area. Power poles were destroyed and irrigation pivots were overturned. Heavy farm equipment was thrown up to 3/4 of a mile. Grain bins and outbuildings were destroyed, and vehicles were flipped. One home sustained heavy roof damage and tree damage occurred as well.
EF1	NNW of Hill City (2nd tornado)	Graham		1857	1 mi (1.6 km)	Satellite tornado to the EF3 Hill City storm
EF1	N of Hill City	Graham		1904	1 mi (1.6 km)	Satellite tornado to the EF3 Hill City storm.
EF0	NNW of Densmore	Norton		1915	2 mi (3.2 km)	Dusty tornado remained over open country with no damage.
EF3	N of Densmore	Norton		1925	4 mi (6.4 km)	One home was badly damaged. Outbuildings were destroyed and power poles were snapped. Trees were snapped and debarked as well.
EF1	S of Calvert	Norton		1926	2 mi (3.2 km)	A barn was destroyed and four power poles were snapped.
EF2	SSE of Calvert	Norton		1930	4 mi (6.4 km)	A barn and grain bin were destroyed. Power lines were damaged and irrigation pivots were overturned. One home was heavily damaged.
EF0	SE of Almena	Norton		1940	2 mi (3.2 km)	Tornado remained over open country with no damage.
EF3	NE of Almena	Norton, Phillips	39.89°N 99.71°W	1941	5 mi (8.0 km)	A house was completely destroyed, where four people were injured. Many homes and farmsteads sustained significant damage in the area. Multiple outbuildings were destroyed and heavy farm equipment was thrown and destroyed as well.
EF0	S of Selden	Sheridan		2227	9 mi (14 km)	Tornado remained over open country with no damage.
EF0	NW of Norcatur	Decatur		2325	1 mi (1.6 km)	Brief tornado remained over open country with no damage.
EF0	NE of Norcatur	Norton		2344	1 mi (1.6 km)	Brief tornado remained over open country with no damage.
EF0	N of Norcatur	Decatur		2345	1 mi (1.6 km)	Brief tornado remained over open country with no damage.
Nebraska
EF1	S of Stamford	Harlan	40.04°N 99.59°W	2000	13 mi (21 km)	Multi-vortex tornado. Several outbuildings were destroyed and many windows were broken. Tornado also destroyed a grain bin and snapped tree limbs.
EF0	ENE of Westmark	Phelps, Buffalo		2035	5 mi (8.0 km)	Tornado overturned multiple irrigation pivots along the path. Minor tree damage also occurred.
EF2	Elm Creek area	Buffalo	40.72°N 99.38°W	2051	4 mi (6.4 km)	Tornado began west of Elm Creek and tracked east-southeast into the city. Numerous trees and were snapped or uprooted and several homes were damaged, some of which lost their roofs. One man was injured when his semi-truck was flipped by the tornado. A few outbuildings were also destroyed and power poles were snapped. While moving through the city, the storm took a sharp northward turn and weakened. Further down the track, the tornado briefly re-intensified as it damaged a home. It dissipated roughly 2.5 mi (4.0 km) southwest Amherst.
EF3	W of Amherst	Buffalo	40.87°N 99.27°W	2109	10 mi (16 km)	See section on this tornado
EF0	N of Pleasanton	Buffalo	40.94°N 99.05°W	2135	4 mi (6.4 km)	Tornado remained over open country with no damage.
EF2	SW of Rockville	Sherman	41.10°N 98.88°W	2146	3 mi (4.8 km)	One home was damaged along with several trees. A pole building was destroyed as well.
EF0	WSW of Farwell	Howard		2205	unknown	Brief tornado touchdown in a field damaged an irrigation pivot.
EF2	SSW of Hampton	Hamilton	40.80°N 97.93°W	2225	9 mi (14 km)	7 homes were damaged by the tornado. Numerous trees and power poles were snapped and multiple outbuildings were damaged or destroyed. A grain truck was overturned and several grain bins were damaged. At least 60 irrigation pivots were damaged or destroyed, some of which were found wrapped around trees.
EF1	S of North Loup	Valley	41.42°N 98.77°W	2235	1 mi (1.6 km)	Damage occurred at Davis Creek campground. Numerous trees were downed and two restroom facilities had their roofs torn off.
EF2	SW of Bradshaw to NE of Polk	York, Polk	40.88°N 97.78°W	2240	17 mi (27 km)	See section on this tornado
EF3	W of Osceola	Polk	41.18°N 97.70°W	2302	9 mi (14 km)	See section on this tornado
EF1	SE of Pierce	Pierce		0027	12 mi (19 km)	Tornado downed numerous trees and power poles and destroyed barns and outbuildings. Irrigation pivots were overturned and a section of roof was torn from a home. Farm equipment was thrown up to 300 yards and other debris was thrown up to a quarter of a mile. A steel bin was thrown into a car, totaling the vehicle, and injuring the occupant.
EF1	Fremont area	Dodge		0100	6 mi (9.7 km)	Tornado struck the northeast side of town. Numerous trees and power poles were snapped, some of which landed on homes and vehicles, and a garage was badly damaged. A YMCA sustained severe roof damage and a vehicle was flipped.
Texas
EF0	E of Eliasville	Stephens	32.95°N 98.72°W	0145	Unknown	Brief tornado with no damage
North Dakota
EF0	SW of Raub	McLean	47.36°N 102.06°W	unknown	unknown	Slow moving tornado remained over open country with no damage.
EF0	NE of Almont	Morton	46.46°N 101.25°W	unknown	unknown	Brief tornado remained over open country with no damage.
Sources: SPC Storm Reports for 06/20/11, NWS Goodland, NWS Hastings

=== June 21 event ===
List of reported tornadoes – Tuesday, June 21, 2011
EF#	Location	County	Coord.	Time (UTC)	Path length	Comments/Damage
Iowa
EF0	NE of Clutier	Tama	42.09°N 92.39°W	0615	300 yards (270 m)	Brief tornado snapped several trees and tore the roof off an outbuilding.
Wisconsin
EF1	WSW of Alto	Fond du Lac, Green Lake	43.66°N 88.85°W	2021	4.6 mi (7.4 km)	A pole-shed was flattened and a barn was damaged. Homes were also damaged. Several trees and power lines were downed.
EF1	SSE of Green Lake	Fond du Lac, Green Lake	43.78°N 88.92°W	2036	2.5 mi (4.0 km)	A barn had part of its roof torn off and a pole shed sustained roof damage. Many trees were snapped or uprooted.
Minnesota
EF0	Coon Rapids area	Anoka	45.17°N 93.31°W	2010	5.5 mi (8.9 km)	Damage was mostly confined to downed trees and power lines, a few of which landed on homes.
Texas
EF0	E of Timpson	Shelby	31.91°N 94.36°W	2055	4 mi (6.4 km)	Several trees and branches were snapped
EF0	W of Center	Shelby	31.79°N 94.23°W	2200	1.5 mi (2.4 km)	Several trees and branches were snapped
Illinois
EF1	S of Downers Grove	DuPage	41.77°N 88.02°W	0131	2.1 mi (3.4 km)	Many trees were snapped and uprooted, which damaged over 35 homes. A fence was blown down as well.
EF1	WSW of Mount Prospect	Cook	42.06°N 87.96°W	0148	2.3 mi (3.7 km)	Numerous trees snapped and uprooted along the path, a few of which landed on homes and caused structural damage.
Sources: SPC Storm Reports for 06/21/11, National Weather Service – June 21st Suburban Chicago Tornadoes

=== June 22 event ===
List of reported tornadoes – Wednesday, June 22, 2011
EF#	Location	County	Coord.	Time (UTC)	Path length	Comments/Damage
Mississippi
EF1	Vardaman area	Calhoun	33.87680°N 89.18581°W	1750	3 mi (4.8 km)	Short-lived tornado downed numerous trees, some of which fell on homes, and damaged several tractor sheds. One person was injured after a tree fell on a home.
Tennessee
EF0	NW of Loudon	Roane	35.77°N 84.47°W	2240	0.1 mi (160 m)	Brief tornado downed several trees.
Indiana
EF0	SW of New Middletown	Harrison	31.84°N 86.04°W	2327	0.3 mi (480 m)	A row of trees was damaged and a house lost some siding.
Michigan
EF0	Lake Leelanau	Leelanau		1837	unknown	Trees were downed and boats and docks were damaged. Tornado moved over the lake and dissipated.
Kentucky
EF2	Louisville area	Jefferson	38.22°N 85.74°W	0004	1.2 mi (1.9 km)	Several barns were badly damaged in Churchill Downs, along with a church on the property. Elsewhere a large industrial building suffered heavy damage and numerous trees were uprooted and snapped. An office building lost a large section of its roof as well. A hotel also sustained roof damage and numerous power poles were snapped. Homes sustained shingle and siding damage and metal stoplight poles were downed. Several horses were displaced by the tornado but were later rounded up uninjured.
EF1	W of downtown Jeffersontown	Jefferson	38.21°N 85.61°W	0129	1.9 mi (3.1 km)	Tornado moved through a subdivision and caused roof, gutter, and siding damage. A locked pool gate was thrown 35 yards (32 m). Several trees were downed as well.
EF2	Downtown Jeffersontown area	Jefferson	38.21°N 85.55°W	0134	1.6 mi (2.6 km)	Numerous trees snapped and uprooted, some of which landed on structures and vehicles. A warehouse and a nursing home were badly damaged and cars were flipped and tossed 25 feet. A small shed was thrown 30 feet and a metal light pole was bent over. A gas station was damaged as well.
EF1	NE of downtown Jeffersontown	Jefferson	38.21°N 85.55°W	0138	1.7 mi (2.7 km)	Several warehouses suffered roof damage. An air handler was thrown 100–125 yards. Dozens of trees were uprooted as well.
Sources: SPC Storm Reports for 06/22/11, NWS louisville

=== Amherst, Nebraska ===
Amherst, Nebraska
- A view of the tornado as it was south of Miller.

Meteorological history
- Formed: June 20, 2011, 4:09 p.m. CDT (UTC−05:00)
- Dissipated: June 20, 2011, 4:37 p.m. CDT (UTC−05:00)
- Duration: 28 minutes

EF3 tornado
- on the Enhanced Fujita scale
- Highest winds: 160 mph (260 km/h)

Overall effects
- Fatalities: 0
- Injuries: 0
- Damage: $8 million (2011 USD)

This very intense and damaging tornado first touched down in Buffalo County, Nebraska, at 4:09 p.m. CDT (21:09 UTC) and around 5 miles (8.0 km) southwest of Amherst, immediately inflicting damage to a metal building. The tornado then struck a nearby residence, tearing large portions of the roof away. The tornado began to rapidly expand and intensify as it crossed NE 40, reaching a max width of 0.75 miles (1.21 km) while producing widespread damage. Along NE 40, the tornado collapsed several transmission towers and overturned various irrigation pivots.

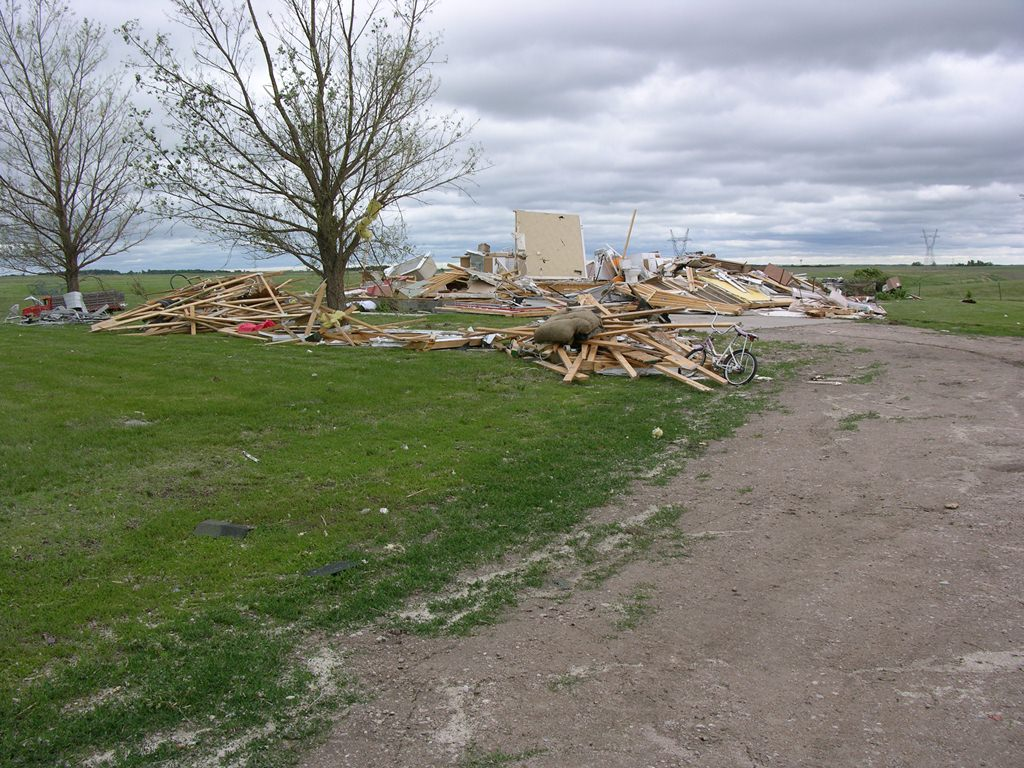
High-end EF3 damage to a home near Amherst, with all walls being collapsed

The tornado continued on its northeastern track, directly striking a home at high-end EF3 intensity, with maximum estimated wind speeds of 160 mph (260 km/h). The home had its walls completely collapsed, with none left standing. Despite the total destruction, 10 people who were inside the home remained uninjured. The tornado made a turn to the north, demolishing several outbuildings and knocking over large metal truss towers. The tornado then snapped tree trunks and tipped over an irrigation pivot approximately 4 miles (6.4 km) north of Amherst before dissipating at 4:37 p.m. CDT (21:37 UTC). The tornado missed the town of Amherst by 2 miles (3.2 km). The tornado tracked for 10 miles (16 km), was on the ground for 28 minutes, and reached a maximum width of 1,320 yards (1,210 m).

A veteran storm chaser who was documenting the event described the tornado as one of the strongest he had ever observed. Along the tornado's path, four homes were completely demolished, with six to eight sustaining major damage. An additional 30 residences had minor damage, and 40 irrigation pivots were damaged or destroyed. A total of $8 million (2011 USD) in damages was inflicted by the tornado.

=== Bradshaw, Nebraska ===
Bradshaw, Nebraska
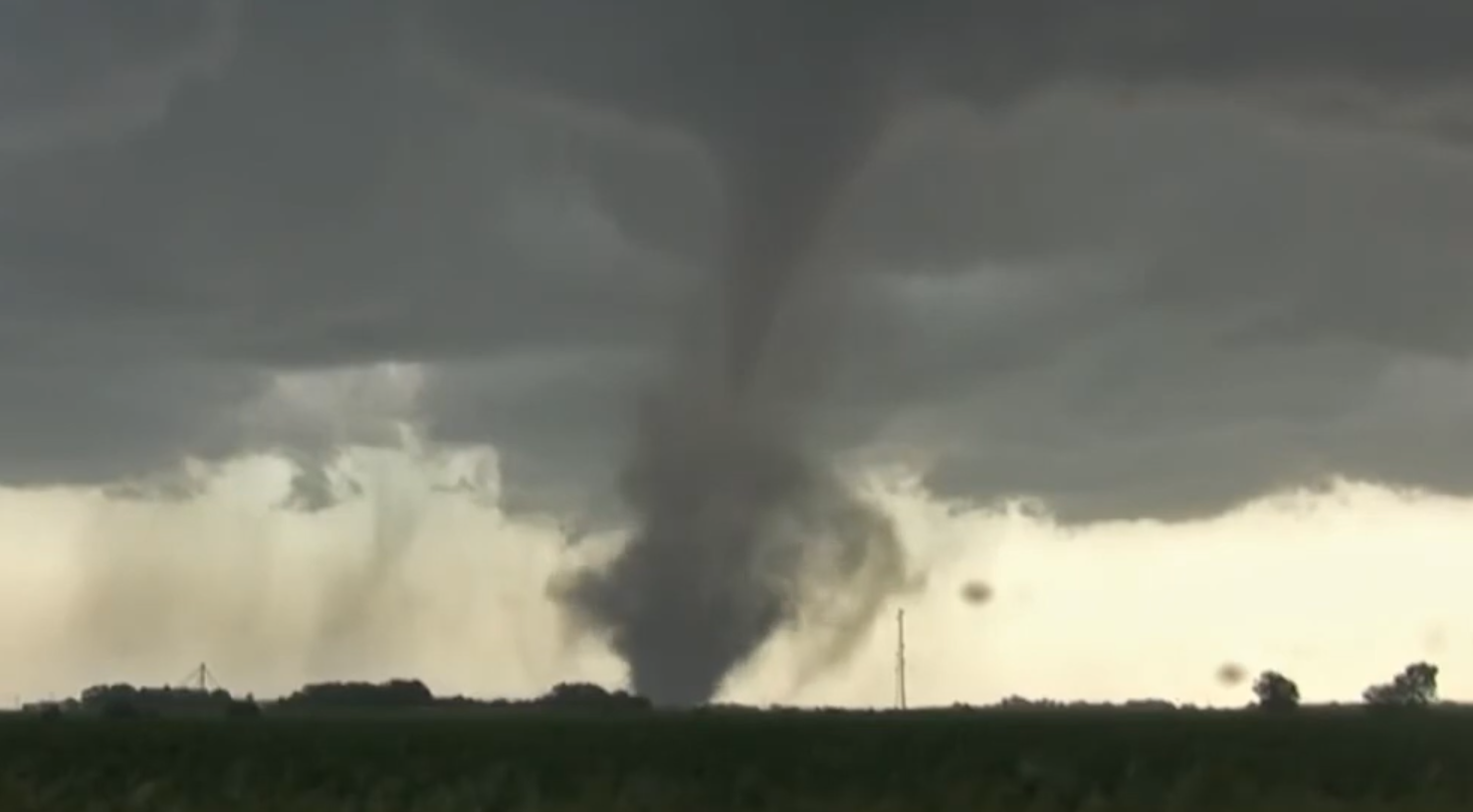
- The tornado seen near Bradshaw.

Meteorological history
- Formed: June 20, 2011, 5:40 p.m. CDT (UTC−05:00)
- Dissipated: June 20, 2011, 6:00 p.m. CDT (UTC−05:00)
- Duration: 20 minutes

EF2 tornado
- on the Enhanced Fujita scale
- Highest winds: 130 mph (210 km/h)

Overall effects
- Fatalities: 0
- Injuries: 0
- Damage: $4 million (2011 USD)

While parts of western Nebraska were enduring the ongoing tornado threat, two new supercell thunderstorms fired in close proximity to one another east of the surface triple point, along the Hamilton–York County line. The storms quickly became tornadic by 5:30 p.m. CDT (22:30 UTC). Around 10 minutes later, a tornado developed north of Henderson and Interstate 80, in western York County.

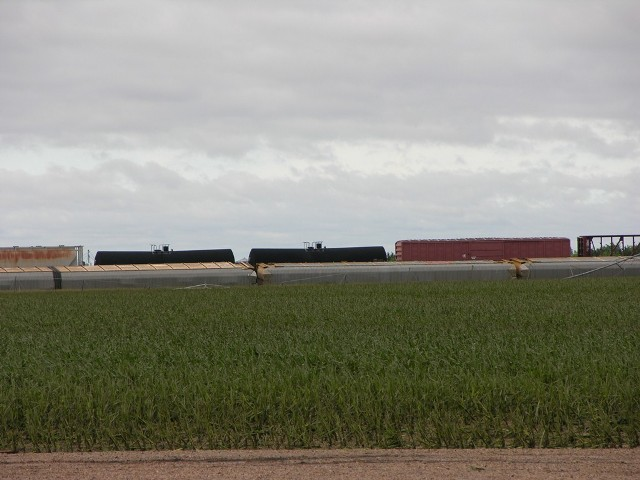
A train that was derailed.

Approximately 1 mile (1.6 km) north of the tornado's touch down, it caused EF1 damage to trees and an irrigation pivot, which was flipped over. The tornado then weakened to EF0 intensity as it inflicted lesser damage to an old powerline pole and trees along the four-way intersection of Roads 12 and C. Continuing north on Road C and southwest of Bradshaw, the tornado rapidly intensified to EF2 strength, possessing winds of around 120 mph (190 km/h) at this point. The tornado yet again weakened as it caused another instance of EF0 damage, before now moving due west of Bradshaw and regaining EF2 status as it impacted a farmstead along I-80 ALT. Here, the tornado destroyed a metal building and a grain bin. Around 0.5 miles (0.80 km) south of the farm, the tornado reportedly derailed a train. The tornado continued along its north-northeast trajectory. A 0.125–0.25 mi (0.201–0.402 km) wide damage swath was reported as the tornado moved through the rural farmland. Paralleling Road E, the tornado caused minor damage to trees at EF1 intensity.

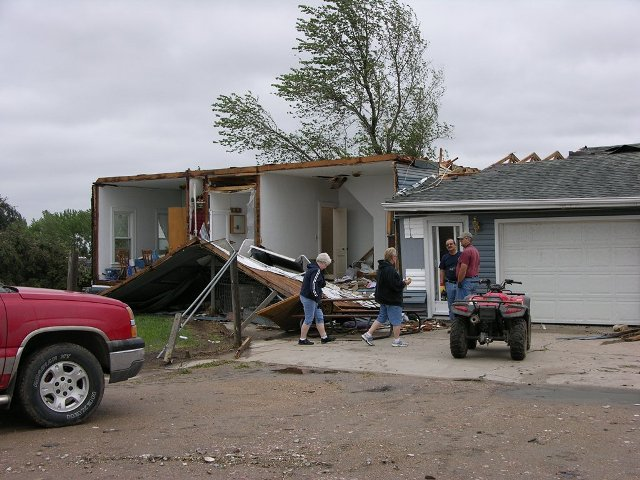
Major damage to a house north of Bradshaw.

Just to the north, the tornado intensified yet again and inflicted EF2 damage to a farmhouse. Large sections of the roof were torn off and a wall was collapsed, and more irrigation pivots were scattered to north. The tornado maintained its EF2 intensity as it snapped numerous wooden poles, and twisted additional pivots. Thereafter to the west of Benedict, the tornado dissipated at 6:00 p.m. CDT (23:00 UTC).

This strong tornado was the first of two produced by a cyclic supercell thunderstorm. The tornado caused considerable amounts of damage to some farmsteads and farming equipment in its path. Some 40 poles were snapped by the storm from areas between Bradshaw to Benedict. Around $4 million (2011 USD) was inflicted by this high-end EF2 tornado, which had according to the National Centers for Environmental Information estimated winds of 130 mph (210 km/h). The tornado tracked a distance of 15.26 miles (24.56 km) long and had a maximum width of 440 yards (400 m).

=== Polk–Osceola, Nebraska ===
Polk–Osceola, Nebraska
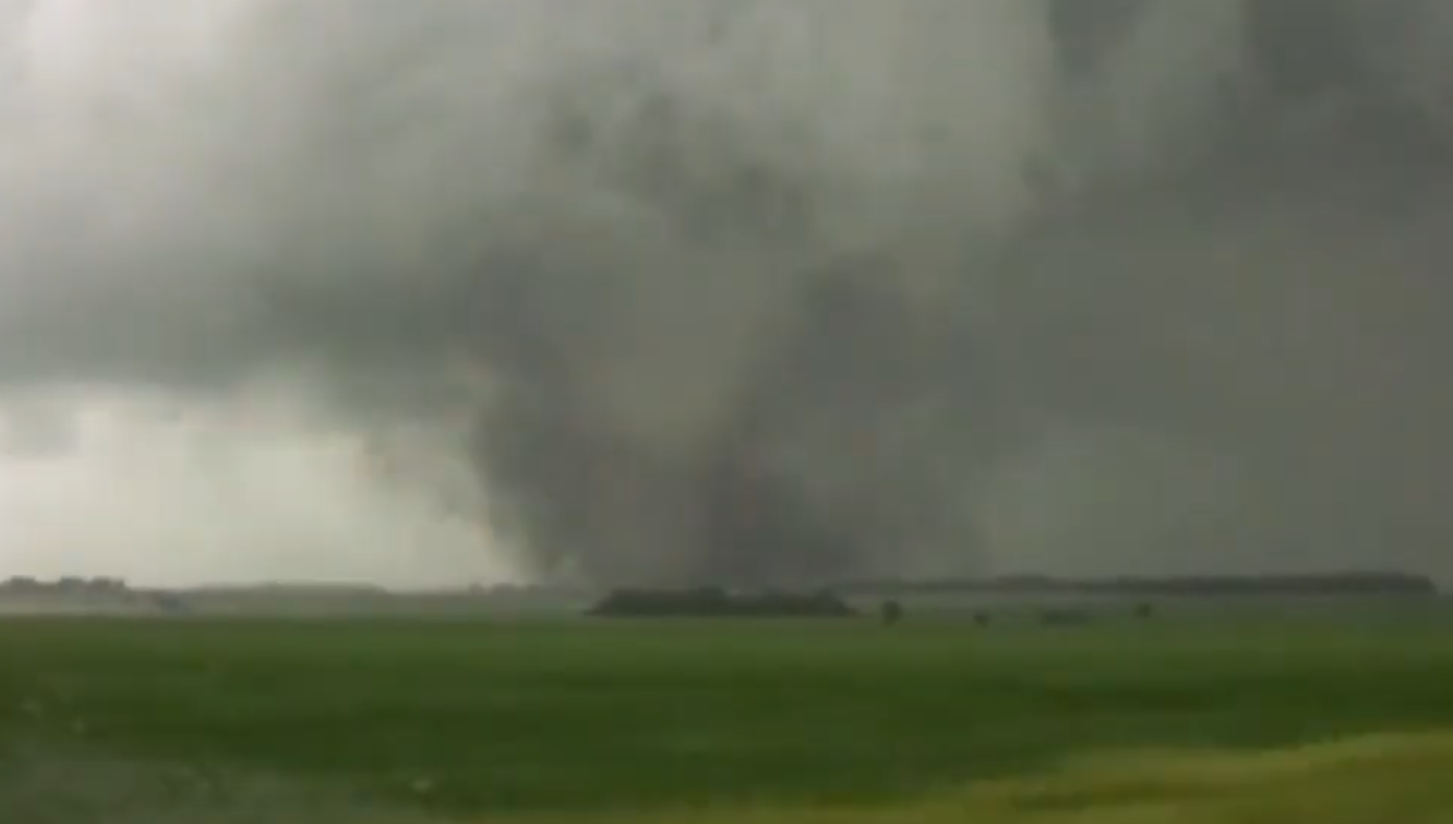
- The tornado seen in rural Polk County.

Meteorological history
- Formed: June 20, 2011, 6:02 p.m. CDT (UTC−05:00)
- Dissipated: June 20, 2011, 6:20 p.m. CDT (UTC−05:00)
- Duration: 18 minutes

EF3 tornado
- on the Enhanced Fujita scale
- Highest winds: 140 mph (230 km/h)

Overall effects
- Fatalities: 0
- Injuries: 0
- Damage: $4.5 million (2011 USD)

After the EF2 tornado that passed west and north of Bradshaw earlier dissipated, the parent supercell moved north into neighboring Polk County. Just 2 minutes after the demise of the earlier tornado in York County, a second tornado formed east of the village of Polk at 6:02 p.m. CDT (23:02 UTC).

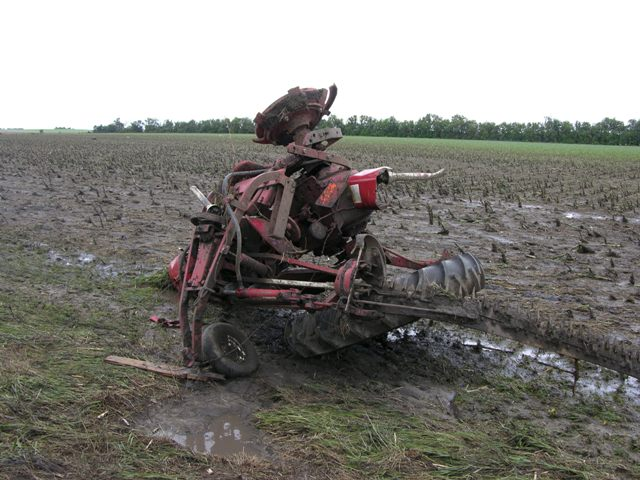
Remains of a tractor tossed into a scoured field.

East of Polk, the tornado ripped the roof off one farmhouse and snapped branches off trees. Moving more to the northeast and beginning to pass west of Stromsburg, the tornado intensified to EF2 strength as it snapped five power poles and overturned irrigation pivots along 124th Road. The tornado then weakened to EF0 intensity as it collapsed all walls on an outbuilding. It regained significant intensity yet again as it headed more in a north-northeast trajectory, again causing EF2 damage by snapping several power poles. The tornado persisted onwards as it moved far northwest of Stromsburg, yet again causing EF2 damage along 128th Road. Here, the tornado downed powerlines, but also stripped 40 acres (160,000 m^{2}) of corn from a nearby farm field out of the ground. A similar instance occurred yet again as the tornado encroached on 129th Road, remaining strong at this time as it left at least a 0.25 mi (0.40 km) wide damage swath at this location.

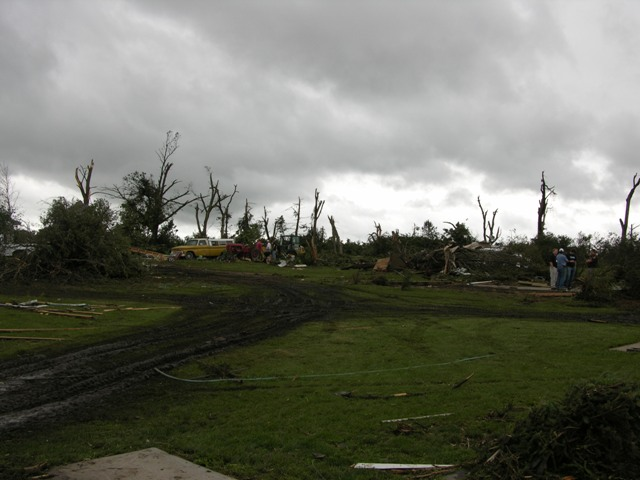
EF3 damage inflicted a farmstead west of Osceola.

Crossing over NE 92, the tornado became intense as it impacted a farm to the west of Osceola. Here, the tornado's core narrowly avoided a direct hit on the residing farmhouse, though the home lost its roof and one wall was collapsed. Major EF3 damage to trees was noted to occur elsewhere on this homestead, with some of them having their trunks snapped or twisted. Winds of 140 mph (230 km/h) at the property. A car, tractor and ATV were thrown north of this location into a nearby field, from their origin points.

Afterwards, the tornado paralleled NE 39, before it began to weaken. Along 39, the tornado impacted another farmstead at EF1 intensity, destroying an outbuilding and garage before dissipating afterwards at 6:20 p.m. CDT (23:20 UTC) to the north-northeast of Swedehome.

The tornado was the second EF3 tornado of the day to occur in Nebraska, and the second to occur from the cyclic supercell. The parent supercell soon lifted along with others as they tracked further into south-central portions of the state. The tornado tracked a path 9.49 miles (15.27 km) and at its largest, was 880 yards (800 m) wide. Approximately $4.5 million (2011 USD) was inflicted by the storm across Polk County, with a significant amount of rural areas heavily impacted.

== See also ==
- List of North American tornadoes and tornado outbreaks
- Tornado outbreak sequence of June 14–19, 2023
