= Nebraska Highway 10 =

State highway in Nebraska, U.S.

State Highway 10

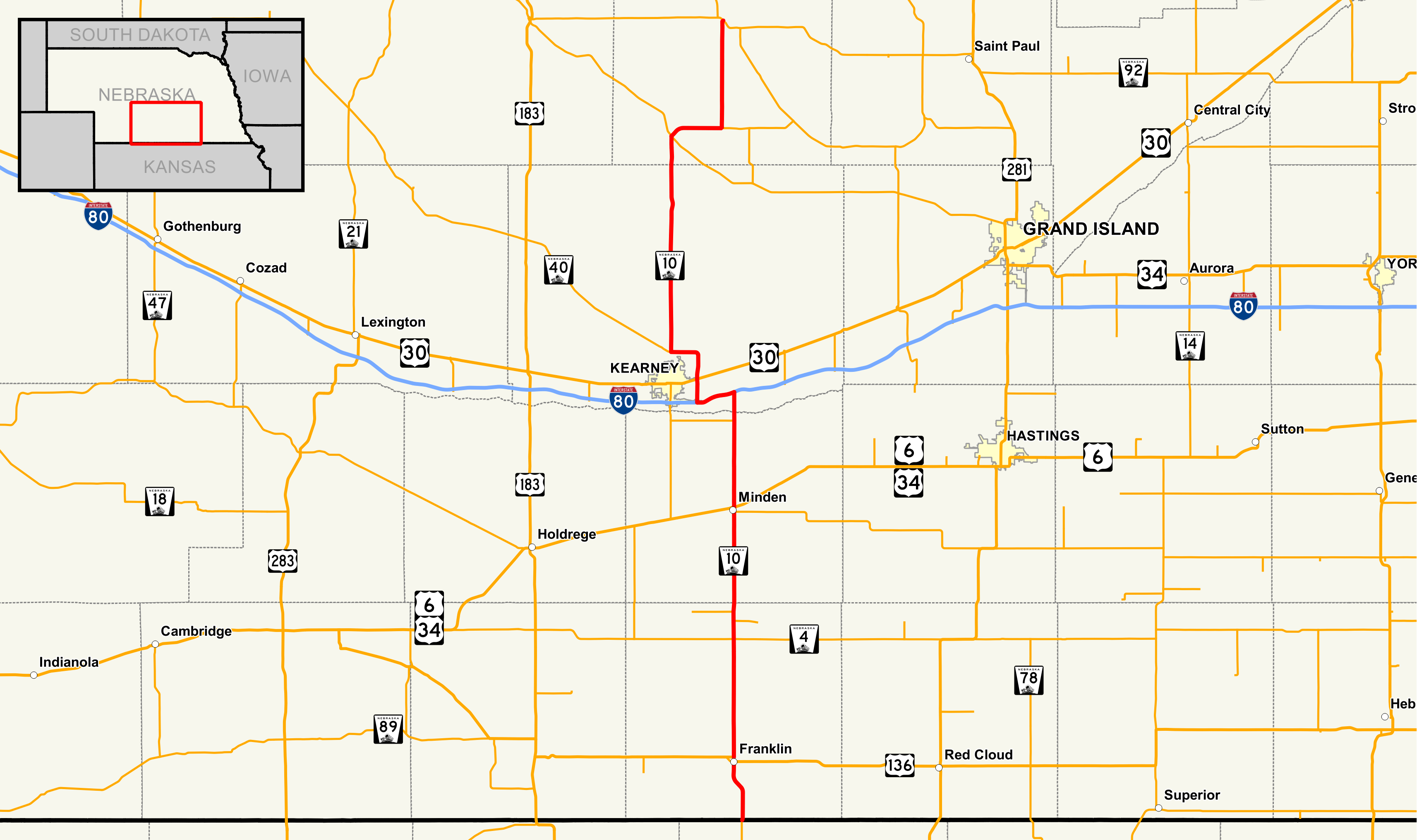
- Nebraska Highway 10 highlighted in red

Route information
- Maintained by NDOT
- Length: 102.18 mi (164.44 km)
- Existed: 1925–present

Major junctions
- South end: K-8 south of Franklin
- US 136 in Franklin; US 6 / US 34 in Minden; I-80 southeast of Kearney
- North end: N-58 / N-92 / R-82B at Loup City

Location
- Country: United States
- State: Nebraska
- Counties: Franklin, Kearney, Buffalo, Sherman

Highway system
- Nebraska State Highway System; Interstate; US; State; Link; Spur; State Spurs; Recreation
← N-9	→ N-11

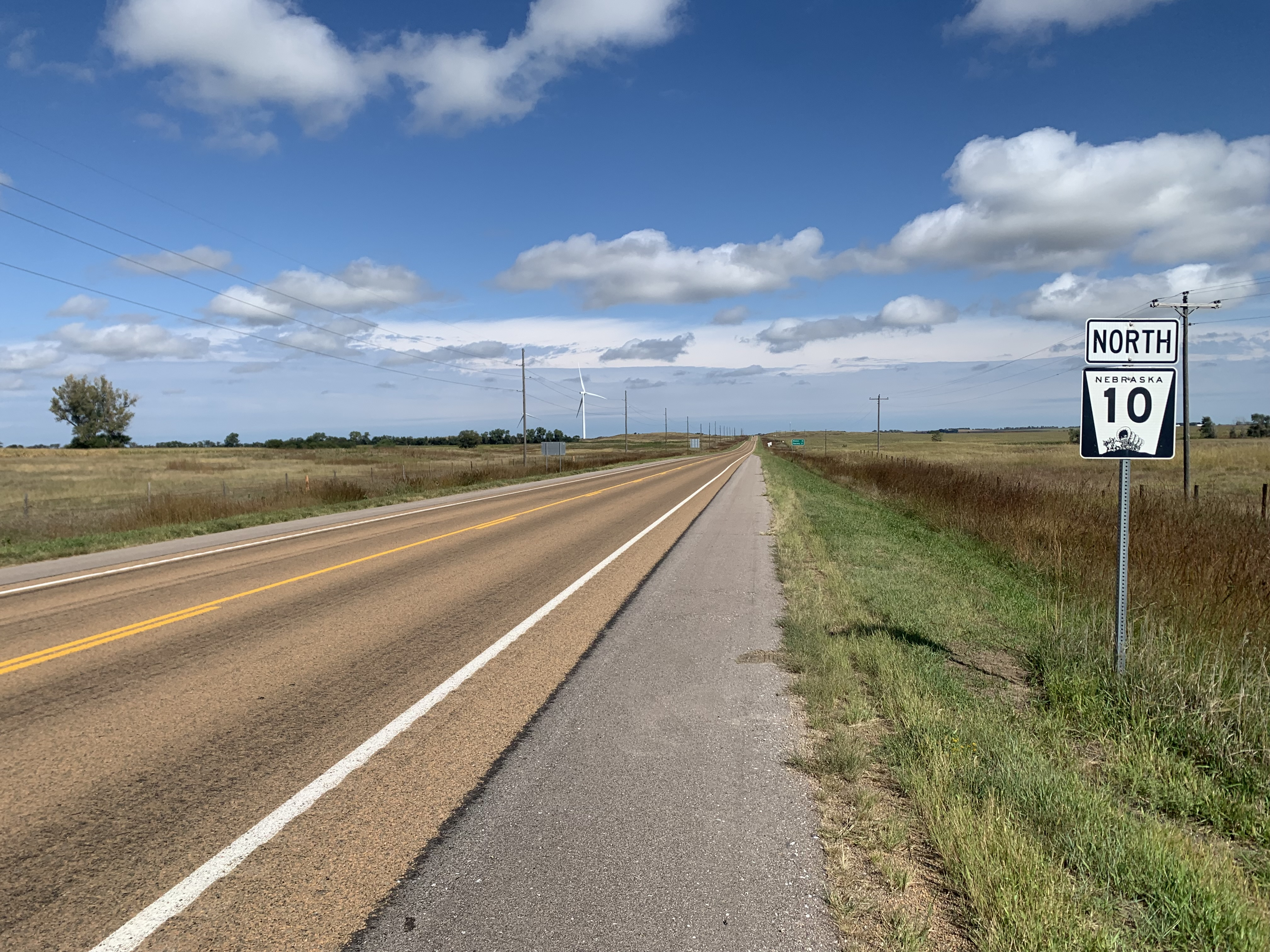
Nebraska Highway 10 in Franklin County, Nebraska

Nebraska Highway 10 is a highway in Nebraska. Its southern terminus is at the Kansas border south of Franklin. Its northern terminus is at an intersection with Nebraska Highway 58, Nebraska Highway 92, and Recreation Road 82B in Loup City.

== Route description ==
Nebraska Highway 10 begins at the Kansas border south of Franklin. This terminus is also the northern terminus of K-8. It continues north through farmland and after a brief turn northwest, turns north into Franklin. In Franklin, it meets U.S. Highway 136. It continues northward, staying on the same line until it meets U.S. Highway 6 and U.S. Highway 34 in Minden. It continues north where it meets Interstate 80 at interchange 279. From there it runs west, concurrently, with Interstate 80 to interchange 275, just east of the Great Platte River Road Archway Monument. Highway 10 then crosses over US 30 at a grade separation with access provided by Link 10-F just to the north. It continues north past Kearney Regional Airport before turning west where it meets Nebraska Highway 40 north of Kearney. Here, it turns north again, goes through Pleasanton, then meets Nebraska Highway 2 at Hazard. It turns northeast, then east and continues in that direction until an intersection with Nebraska Link 82A, then turns north. It proceeds north until ending in Loup City at an intersection with Nebraska Highway 92 and Nebraska Highway 58.

== Former alignment ==
In November 2016, the East Kearney Bypass was officially opened to traffic. This replaced the former route of Highway 10 which crossed I-80 at interchange 279 to meet US 30 east of Kearney. It then ran west, concurrently, with US 30 into Kearney before departing north along 2nd Avenue at the intersection of US 30 and Highway 44 where it continued north along its present route.

== Major intersections ==
County	Location	mi	km	Destinations	Notes
40th parallel north		0.00	0.00	K-8 south / A Road	Nebraska–Kansas line; highway continues into Kansas as K-8
Franklin	Franklin	6.82	10.98	US 136 east (M Street east) / L-31D west (M Street west) – Business District	South end of US 136 overlap
Franklin	Franklin	7.32	11.78	US 136 west – Alma	North end of US 136 overlap
Franklin	Antelope–Salem township line	20.38	32.80	N-4 – Ragan, Campbell	
Franklin	Antelope–Salem township line	22.39	36.03	S-31A east – Upland	
Franklin	Antelope–Salem township line	23.40	37.66	S-31B west (X Road) – Hildreth	
Kearney	Minden	34.41	55.38	N-74 east (1st Street)	Western terminus of N-74; serves Kearney County Community Hospital
Kearney	Minden	34.92	56.20	US 6 / US 34 / Truck Route to N-74 east	
Kearney	Newark Township	44.44	71.52	L-50A west – Fort Kearny	
Buffalo	Gibbon–Center township line	47.59	76.59	I-80 east – Grand Island	South end of I-80 concurrency; I-80 exit 279
Buffalo	Kearney	52.09	83.83	I-80 west	North end of I-80 concurrency; I-80 exit 275
Buffalo	Kearney	55.13	88.72	L-10F (39th Street) to US 30	Roundabout; provides access to grade-separated US 30
Buffalo	Glenwood Park	60.45	97.28	N-40 west (78th Street) / 2nd Avenue	Roundabout; 2nd Avenue is former N-10 south
Sherman	Harrison Precinct	84.02	135.22	777 Road to N-2 – Hazard, Grand Island	
Sherman	Harrison Precinct	84.12	135.38	N-2 – Broken Bow, Grand Island	
Sherman	Rockville Precinct	89.94	144.74	L-82A east – Rockville, Ravenna	
Sherman	Loup City	101.71	163.69	N-58 / N-92 R-82B east (O Street) – Sherman Reservoir State Recreation Area, Business District	Northern terminus; highway continues east as R-82B
1.000 mi = 1.609 km; 1.000 km = 0.621 mi: Concurrency terminus; Route transition
