= Elm Township, Nebraska =

Elm Township, Nebraska may refer to the following places:

- Elm Township, Antelope County, Nebraska
- Elm Township, Gage County, Nebraska

== See also ==
- Elm Creek Township, Buffalo County, Nebraska
- Elm Township (disambiguation)
