= Divide Township =

Divide Township may refer to the following townships in the United States:

- Divide Township, Buffalo County, Nebraska
- Divide Township, Phelps County, Nebraska
- Divide Township, Dickey County, North Dakota
