= Glenwood, Nebraska =

- Census-designated place
- Location within Nebraska Location within the United States
- Coordinates: 40°45′19″N 99°04′52″W
- Country: United States
- State: Nebraska
- County: Buffalo

Area
  - Total: 2.40 sq mi (6.22 km^{2})
  - Land: 2.40 sq mi (6.22 km^{2})
  - Water: 0 sq mi (0.00 km^{2})
- Elevation: 2,142 ft (653 m)

Population (2020)
  - Total: 503
  - Density: 209.5/sq mi (80.89/km^{2})
- Time zone: UTC-6 (Central (CST))
  - Summer (DST): UTC-5 (CDT)
- Area code: 308
- FIPS code: 31-19160
- GNIS feature ID: 2587007

Glenwood is a census-designated place (CDP) in Buffalo County, Nebraska, United States. It conforms to the unincorporated area known as Glenwood Park. It is part of the Kearney, Nebraska Micropolitan Statistical Area. As of the 2020 census, Glenwood had a population of 503.

== History ==
A post office was established at Glenwood Park in 1892, was renamed Glenwood in 1894, and remained in operation until it was discontinued in 1900. Glenwood Park was named from a local park.

== Geography ==
Glenwood is located in southern Buffalo County, directly north of Kearney, the county seat. It is 3.4 miles (5.5 km) south from the center of Glenwood to the center of Kearney. Nebraska Highway 10 leads through the center of the CDP, connecting Kearney to the south with Pleasanton 15 miles (24 km) to the north. Nebraska Highway 40 leads northwest from the center of Glenwood to Miller 21 miles (34 km) away.

According to the United States Census Bureau, the Glenwood CDP has a total area of 2.4 square miles (6.3 km^{2}), all land.

== Demographics ==
Historical population
Census	Pop.	Note	%±
2020	503		—
U.S. Decennial Census
