= Divide Township, Nebraska =

Divide Township, Nebraska may refer to the following places in Nebraska:

- Divide Township, Buffalo County, Nebraska
- Divide Township, Phelps County, Nebraska
