= Rusco =

Rusco may refer to:

- Poggio Rusco, town in Italy
- Rusco Tower, tower house in Scotland
- Rusco Township, Buffalo County, Nebraska
