= Elm Township =

Elm Township may refer to the following places in the United States:

- Elm Township, Allen County, Kansas
- Elm Township, Putnam County, Missouri
- Elm Township, Antelope County, Nebraska
- Elm Township, Gage County, Nebraska

== See also ==
- Elm Creek Township, Buffalo County, Nebraska
