= Sartoria, Nebraska =

Unincorporated community in Nebraska, U.S.

Coordinates: 40°58′42″N 99°12′50″W

Sartoria is an unincorporated community in Sartoria Township, Buffalo County, Nebraska, United States.

== History ==
A post office was established at Sartoria in 1886, and remained in operation until it was discontinued in 1924. The name Sartoria was coined by a pioneer settler because he imagined it would be easy for anyone to pronounce.
