= Sweetwater, Nebraska =

- U6 (FIPS 55-3), Unincorporated community
- Interactive map of Sweetwater, Nebraska
- Coordinates: 41°02′40″N 99°00′27″W
- Country: United States
- State: Nebraska
- County: Buffalo
- Elevation: 2,060 ft (628 m)
- Time zone: UTC-6 (Central (CST))
  - Summer (DST): UTC-5 (CDT)
- ZIP code: 68869
- Area code: 308
- GNIS feature ID: 835461

Sweetwater is an unincorporated community in Beaver Township, Buffalo County, Nebraska, United States. It lies along Nebraska Highway 2, halfway between Ravenna and Hazard. It is a part of the Kearney, Nebraska Micropolitan Statistical Area. Sweetwater is located on Mud Creek, a tributary of the South Loup River.

== Geography ==
Sweetwater is located at 41°02′40″N 99°00′27″W (41.0444553, -99.0075863). Its Census code is 48165, census class: U6.

== History ==
The community was named for a spring noted by pioneers for its clean drinking water. There was a railway station there. The Sweetwater post office was established in 1874, and remained in operation until it was discontinued in 1961.

== Appearance in Fiction ==
The fictional community of Sweet Water in Willa Cather's novel, A Lost Lady may be inspired by Sweetwater, Nebraska. Like Sweetwater, the fictional town is a railway stop between Omaha and Denver. Sweetwater is also the setting for the TV show The Young Riders.
