= Armada Township =

Armada Township may refer to one of the following places in the United States:

- Armada Township, Michigan
- Armada Township, Buffalo County, Nebraska
