= Odessa, Nebraska =

- Census-designated place
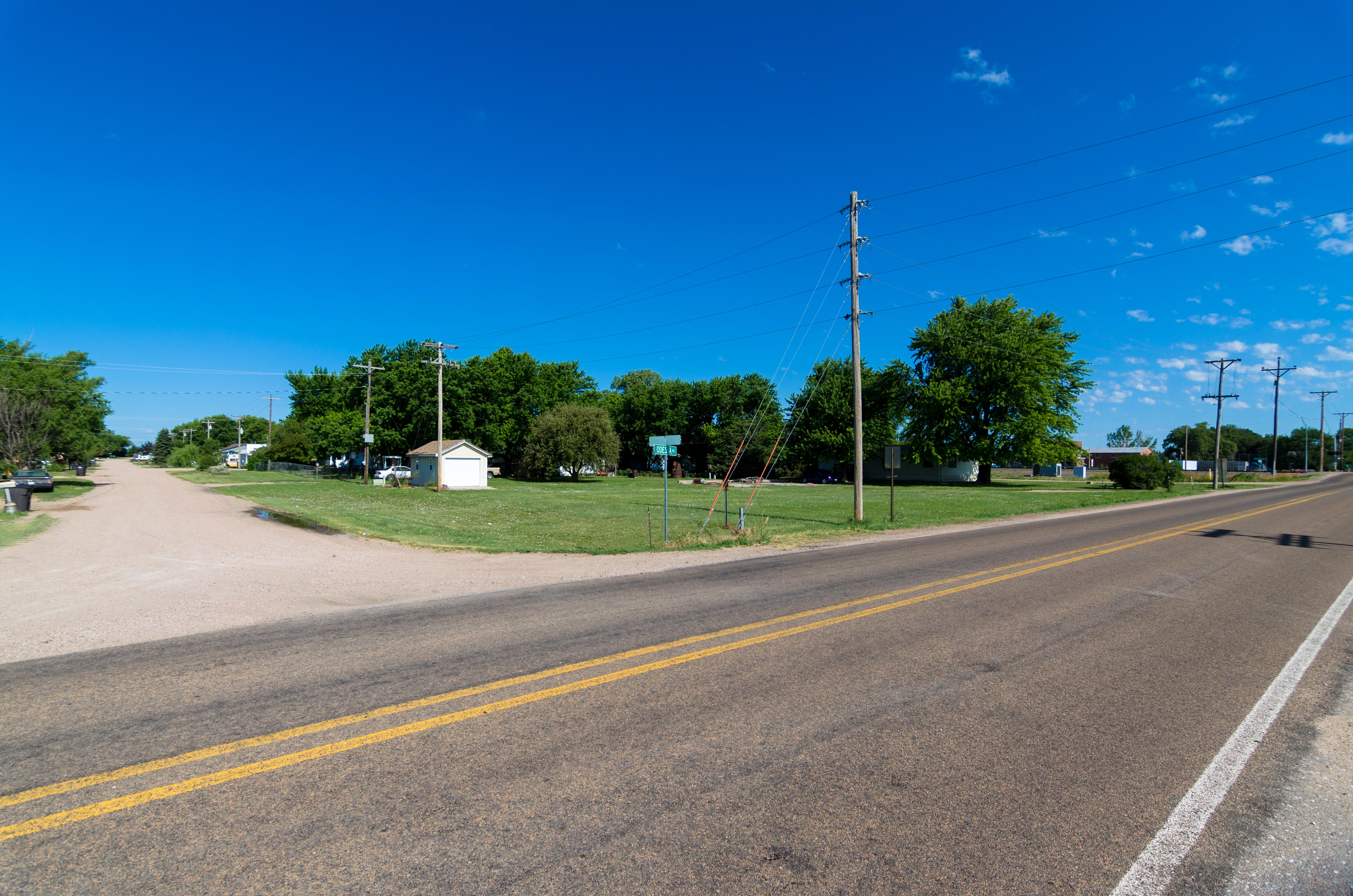
- Odessa Road and Strong Avenue in Odessa

- Location within Nebraska Location within the United States
- Coordinates: 40°41′57″N 99°15′16″W
- Country: United States
- State: Nebraska
- County: Buffalo

Area
  - Total: 1.82 sq mi (4.72 km^{2})
  - Land: 1.82 sq mi (4.72 km^{2})
  - Water: 0 sq mi (0.00 km^{2})
- Elevation: 2,215 ft (675 m)

Population (2020)
  - Total: 132
  - Density: 72.4/sq mi (27.95/km^{2})
- Time zone: UTC-6 (Central (CST))
  - Summer (DST): UTC-5 (CDT)
- ZIP code: 68861
- Area code: 308
- FIPS code: 31-35770
- GNIS feature ID: 2587010

Odessa is a census-designated place (CDP) in Odessa Township, Buffalo County, Nebraska, United States. It is part of the Kearney, Nebraska Micropolitan Statistical Area. As of the 2020 census, Odessa had a population of 132.

It was named after Odesa, Ukraine.

== Geography ==
Odessa is located in southwestern Buffalo County along U.S. Route 30, 9 miles (14 km) west of Kearney, the county seat. It is 6 miles (10 km) west to Elm Creek via US 30. Interstate 80 passes to the south of Odessa, with access via Exit 263 (Highway 10B/Odessa Road).

According to the United States Census Bureau, the Odessa CDP has a total area of 1.8 square miles (4.7 km^{2}), all land.

== Demographics ==
Historical population
Census	Pop.	Note	%±
2020	132		—
U.S. Decennial Census
