= Nebraska Highway 40 =

State highway in Nebraska, U.S.

State Highway 40

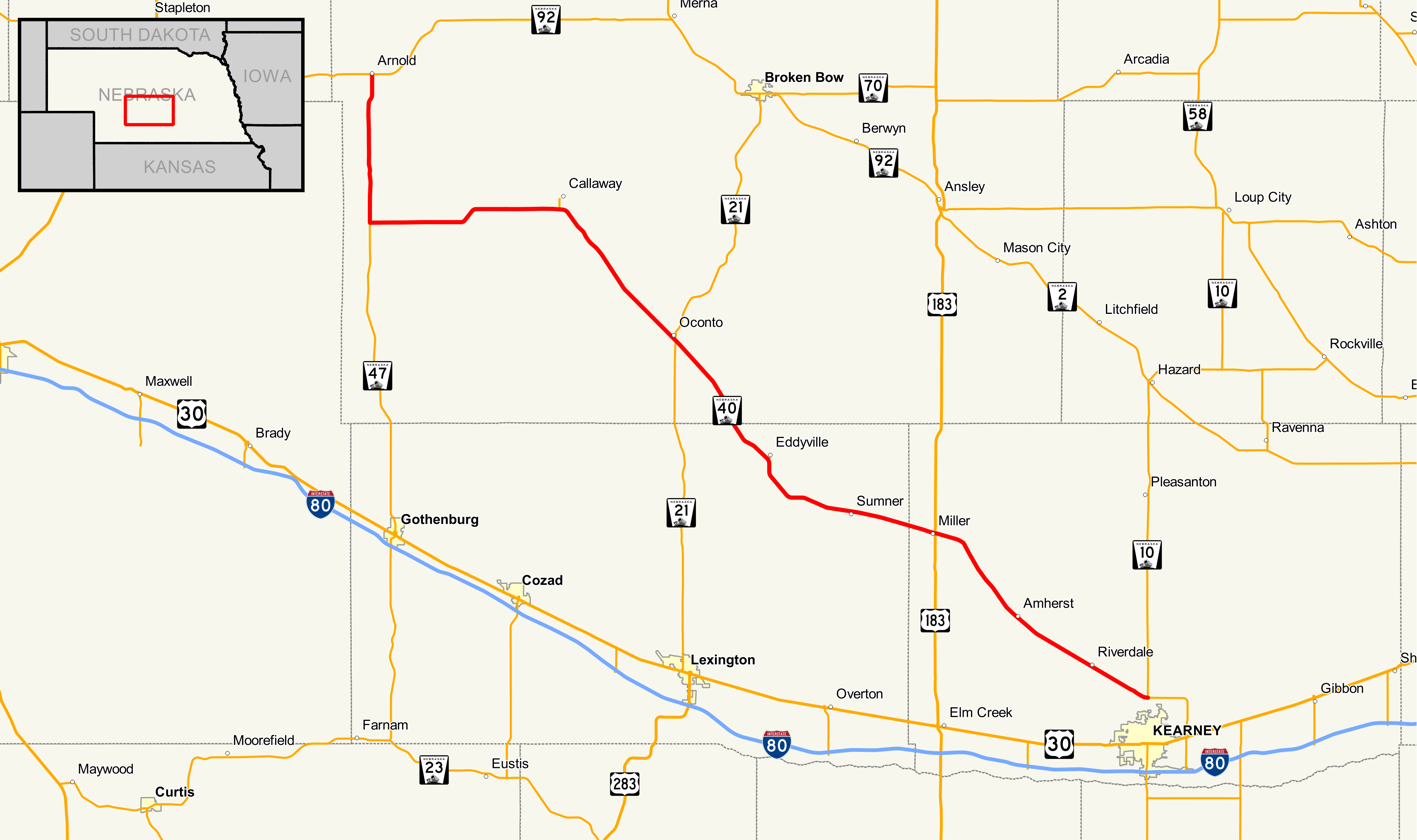
- Nebraska Highway 40 highlighted in red

Route information
- Maintained by NDOT
- Length: 85.72 mi (137.95 km)
- Existed: 1933–present

Major junctions
- West end: N-92 in Arnold
- US 183 in Miller
- East end: N-10 north of Kearney

Location
- Country: United States
- State: Nebraska
- Counties: Custer, Dawson, Buffalo

Highway system
- Nebraska State Highway System; Interstate; US; State; Link; Spur; State Spurs; Recreation
| ← N-39 | → N-41 |

Nebraska Highway 40 is a highway in central Nebraska. It has a length of 85.73 miles (137.97 km). It has a western terminus at Nebraska Highway 92 in Arnold and an eastern terminus north of Kearney at an intersection with Nebraska Highway 10.

== Route description ==
Nebraska Highway 40 begins in Arnold at an intersection with Nebraska Highway 92. It goes south out of Arnold into farmland and at an intersection with Nebraska Highway 47, turns east. It continues east until Nebraska Spur 21B, a spur road into Callaway, then turns southeasterly. At Oconto, Highway 40 meets Nebraska Highway 21. It continues in a southeasterly direction through Eddyville and Sumner and at Miller, meets U.S. Highway 183. It continues southeast through Amherst and Riverdale and ends north of Kearney at an intersection with Nebraska Highway 10. Much of the alignment of Nebraska Highway 40 from Oconto southeastward to its eastern terminus lies parallel to the Wood River.

== Major intersections ==
| County | Location | mi | km | Destinations | Notes |
|---|---|---|---|---|---|
| Custer | Arnold | 0.00 | 0.00 | N-92 (Arnold Avenue) | Western terminus |
| Custer | | 11.10 | 17.86 | N-47 south | |
| Custer | Callaway | 25.65 | 41.28 | S-21B north | |
| Custer | Oconto | 38.84 | 62.51 | N-21 | |
| Dawson | Eddyville | 50.29 | 80.93 | S-24C east | |
| Buffalo | Miller | 65.00 | 104.61 | US 183 (Armada Street) | |
| Buffalo | Glenwood Park | 85.72 | 137.95 | N-10 | Eastern terminus; roundabout |
1.000 mi = 1.609 km; 1.000 km = 0.621 mi
