= Prairie Center =

Prairie Center may refer to:

- Prairie Center, Illinois, an unincorporated community in LaSalle County
- Prairie Center, Nebraska, an unincorporated community in Buffalo County
