= Riverdale Township, Buffalo County, Nebraska =

Riverdale Township
- Township
- Location in Buffalo County
- Coordinates: 40°45′23″N 099°07′53″W
- Country: United States
- State: Nebraska
- County: Buffalo

Area
  - Total: 27.93 sq mi (72.34 km^{2})
  - Land: 27.93 sq mi (72.34 km^{2})
  - Water: 0 sq mi (0 km^{2}) 0%
- Elevation: 2,178 ft (664 m)

Population (2000)
  - Total: 1,939
  - Density: 69/sq mi (26.8/km^{2})
- GNIS feature ID: 0838213

Riverdale Township is one of twenty-six townships in Buffalo County, Nebraska, United States. The population was 1,939 at the 2000 census. A 2006 estimate placed the township's population at 1,908.

Most of the Village of Riverdale lies within the Township.

== See also ==
- County government in Nebraska
