= Saint Michael, Nebraska =

Unincorporated community in Nebraska, U.S.

Coordinates: 41°01′25″N 98°44′52″W

Saint Michael is an unincorporated community in Buffalo County, Nebraska, United States.

== History ==
A post office was established at Saint Michael in 1887, and remained in operation until it was discontinued in 1956. Saint Michael was named for Mike Kyne, an Irish settler who agreed to sell his land for a town in exchange for the naming rights.
