= Denman, Nebraska =

Unincorporated community in Nebraska, United States

- Unincorporated Community
- Location within Nebraska Location within the United States
- Coordinates: 40.7°N 98.7°W
- Country: United States
- State: Nebraska
- County: Buffalo

Denman is an unincorporated community in Buffalo County, Nebraska, United States.

== History ==
A post office was established at Denman in 1914, and remained in operation until it was discontinued in 1956. Denman was named for Francis Marion Denman, the original owner of the town site.
