= Grant Township, Buffalo County, Nebraska =

Grant Township
- Township
- Location in Buffalo County
- Coordinates: 40°49′32″N 099°15′12″W
- Country: United States
- State: Nebraska
- County: Buffalo

Area
  - Total: 35.82 sq mi (92.77 km^{2})
  - Land: 35.82 sq mi (92.77 km^{2})
  - Water: 0 sq mi (0 km^{2}) 0%
- Elevation: 2,221 ft (677 m)

Population (2000)
  - Total: 533
  - Density: 15/sq mi (5.7/km^{2})
- GNIS feature ID: 0838034

Grant Township is one of twenty-six townships in Buffalo County, Nebraska, United States. The population was 533 at the 2000 census. A 2006 estimate placed the township's population at 519.

The Village of Amherst lies within the Township.

== See also ==
- County government in Nebraska
