= Buffalo County, Nebraska =

County in Nebraska, United States

- County
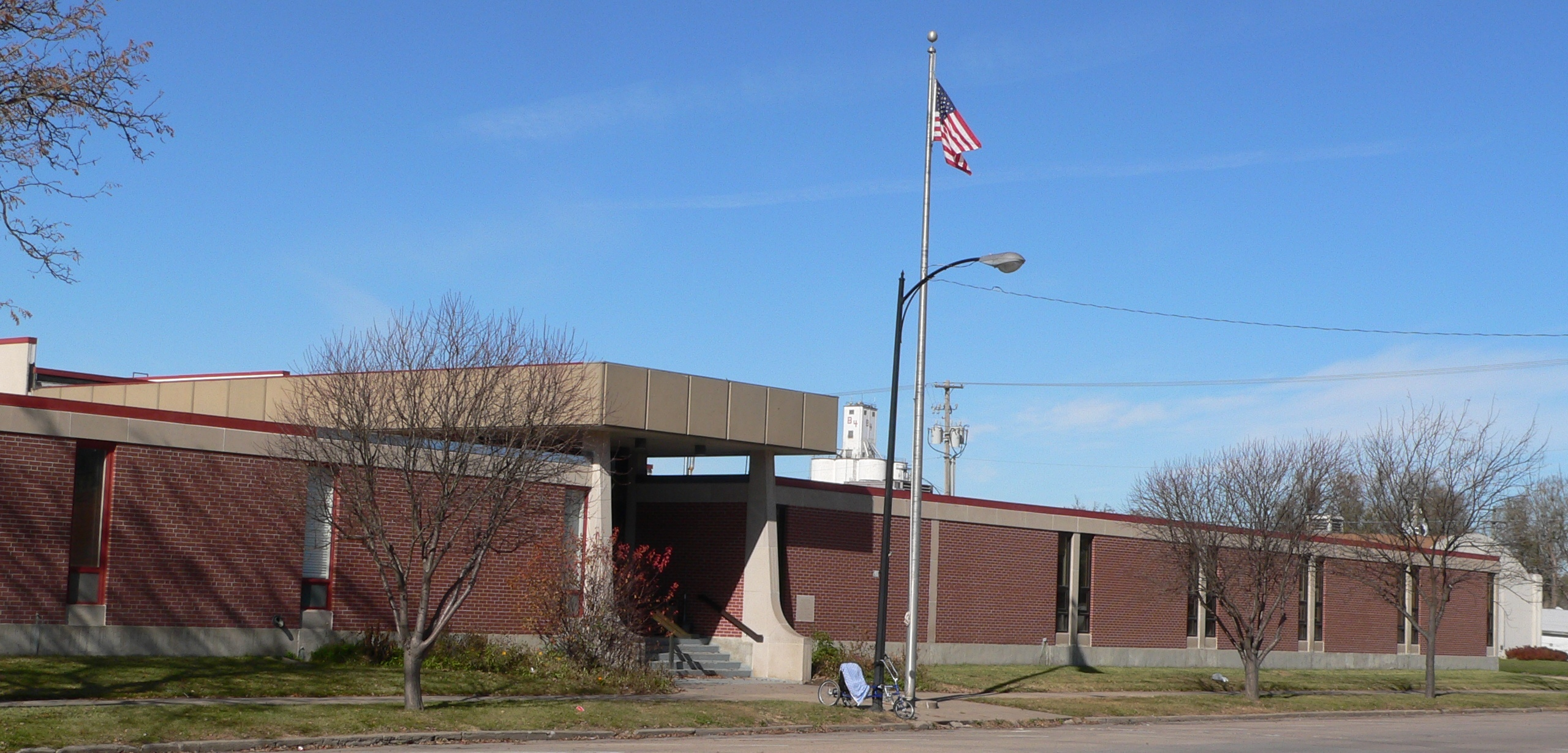
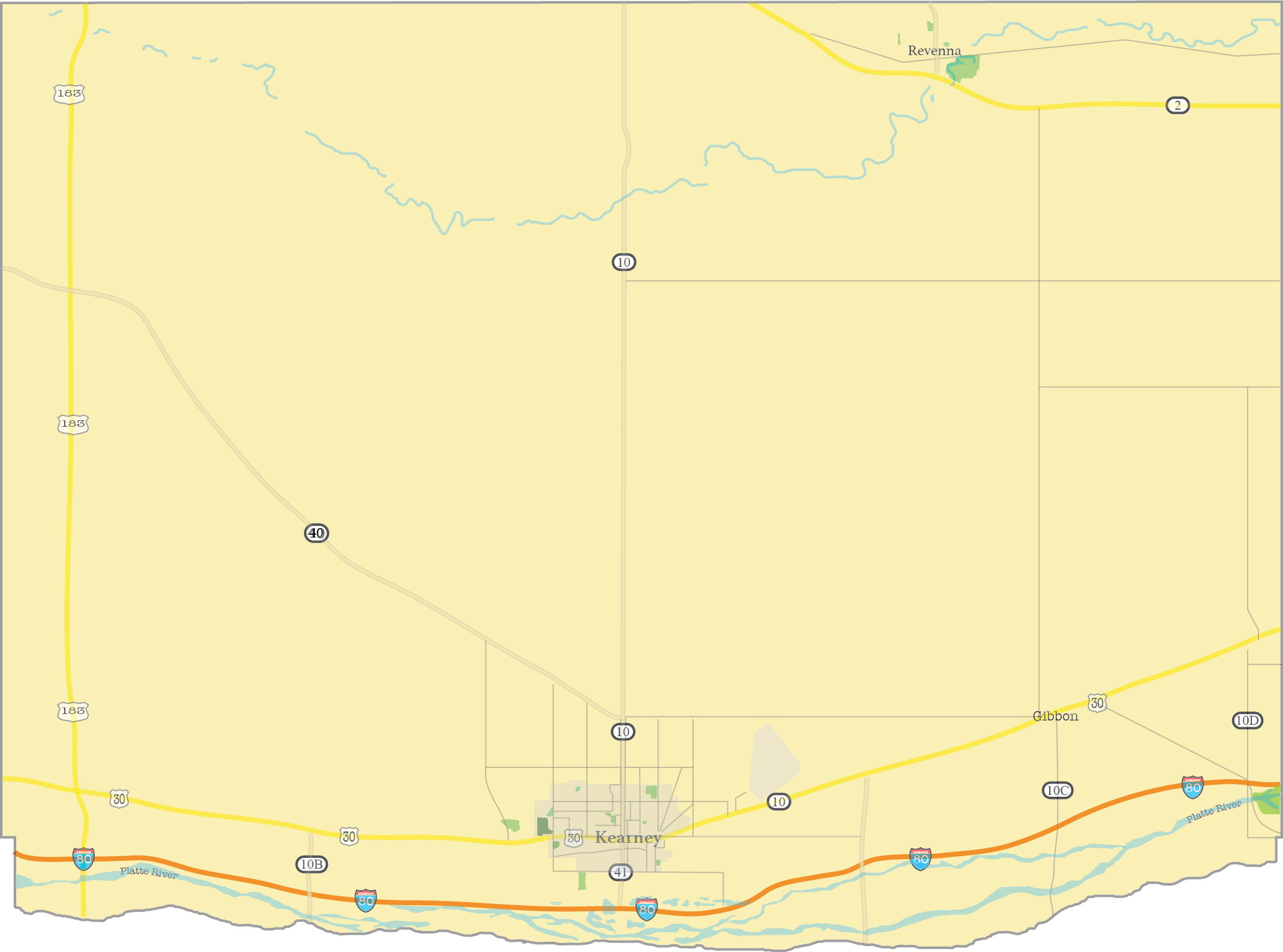
- The Buffalo County Courthouse in Kearney Buffalo County, Nebraska

- Location within the U.S. state of Nebraska
- Coordinates: 40.8553°N 99.0750°W
- Country: United States
- State: Nebraska
- Created: March 16, 1855
- Organized: October 1, 1870
- Named for: American bison
- Seat: Kearney
- Largest city: Kearney

Area
  - Total: 975.399 sq mi (2,526.27 km^{2})
  - Land: 968.246 sq mi (2,507.75 km^{2})
  - Water: 7.153 sq mi (18.53 km^{2}) 0.73%

Population (2020)
  - Total: 50,084
  - Estimate (2025): 51,172 ▲
  - Density: 51.727/sq mi (19.972/km^{2})
- Time zone: UTC−6 (Central)
  - Summer (DST): UTC−5 (CDT)
- Area code: 308
- Congressional district: 3rd
- Website: buffalocounty.ne.gov
- • Nebraska county number 10 • Nebraska license plate prefix 09

Buffalo County is a county located in the U.S. state of Nebraska. As of the 2020 census, the population was 50,084, and was estimated to be 51,172 in 2025, making it the fifth-most populous county in Nebraska. The county seat and the largest city is Kearney.

Buffalo County is part of the Kearney micropolitan area.

In the Nebraska license plate system, Buffalo County was represented by the prefix "9" (as it had the ninth-largest number of vehicles registered in the state when the license plate system was established in 1922).

== History ==
Buffalo County was created on March 16, 1855 and organized on October 1, 1870. It was named after the once-prevalent bison herds of the Great Plains.

The Union Pacific Railroad came to the area in 1866; with additional settlers, the need to establish government was realized. Patrick Walsh, Martin Slattery, and a Sergeant Cody petitioned the governor to organize Buffalo County in 1869. Wood River Centre (Shelton) was selected through election as county seat. Within a year, the seat was moved to Gibbon. In 1874, voters selected Kearney as the seat.

During the late 19th century and early 20th century, the Watson Ranch, existed in the county. The 8,000 acre ranch extended from the Platte River Valley on the south, to Nebraska's rolling hills on the north, to a point five miles west of downtown Kearney.

== Geography ==
According to the United States Census Bureau, the county has a total area of 975.399 square miles (2,526.27 km^{2}), of which 968.246 square miles (2,507.75 km^{2}) is land and 7.153 square miles (18.53 km^{2}) (0.73%) is water. It is the 18th-largest county in Nebraska by total area.

=== Major highways ===
- Interstate 80
- U.S. Highway 30
- U.S. Highway 183
- Nebraska Highway 2
- Nebraska Highway 10
- Nebraska Highway 40
- Nebraska Highway 44
- Nebraska Highway 68

=== Transit ===
- Burlington Trailways
- Express Arrow

=== Protected area ===
- Fort Kearny State Historical Park

=== Adjacent counties ===
- Hall County – east
- Adams County – southeast
- Kearney County – south
- Phelps County – southwest
- Dawson County – west
- Custer County – northwest
- Sherman County – north
- Howard County – northeast

== Demographics ==
Historical population
Census	Pop.	Note	%±
1860	114		—
1870	193		69.3%
1880	7,531		3,802.1%
1890	22,162		194.3%
1900	20,254		−8.6%
1910	21,907		8.2%
1920	23,787		8.6%
1930	24,338		2.3%
1940	23,655		−2.8%
1950	25,134		6.3%
1960	26,236		4.4%
1970	31,222		19.0%
1980	34,797		11.5%
1990	37,447		7.6%
2000	42,259		12.9%
2010	46,102		9.1%
2020	50,084		8.6%
2025 (est.)	51,172	▲	2.2%
U.S. Decennial Census; 1790–1960 1900–1990; 1990–2000 2010–2020

As of the third quarter of 2025, the median home value in Buffalo County was $264,186.

As of the 2024 American Community Survey, there are 19,984 estimated households in Buffalo County with an average of 2.42 persons per household. The county has a median household income of $75,911. Approximately 9.9% of the county's population lives at or below the poverty line. Buffalo County has an estimated 68.7% employment rate, with 34.4% of the population holding a bachelor's degree or higher and 93.8% holding a high school diploma. There were 21,286 housing units at an average density of 21.98 per square mile (8.5/km^{2}).

The top five reported languages (people were allowed to report up to two languages, thus the figures will generally add to more than 100%) were English (91.2%), Spanish (6.1%), Indo-European (1.1%), Asian and Pacific Islander (1.5%), and Other (0.1%).

The median age in the county was 35.1 years.

Buffalo County, Nebraska – racial and ethnic composition Note: the US Census treats Hispanic/Latino as an ethnic category. This table excludes Latinos from the racial categories and assigns them to a separate category. Hispanics/Latinos may be of any race.
Race / ethnicity (NH = non-Hispanic)	Pop. 1980	Pop. 1990	Pop. 2000	Pop. 2010	Pop. 2020
White alone (NH)	33,745 (96.98%)	35,992 (96.11%)	39,313 (93.03%)	41,128 (89.21%)	42,108 (84.07%)
Black or African American alone (NH)	51 (0.15%)	161 (0.43%)	229 (0.54%)	354 (0.77%)	600 (1.20%)
Native American or Alaska Native alone (NH)	70 (0.20%)	101 (0.27%)	120 (0.28%)	101 (0.22%)	149 (0.30%)
Asian alone (NH)	104 (0.30%)	156 (0.42%)	288 (0.68%)	587 (1.27%)	660 (1.32%)
Pacific Islander alone (NH)	—	—	7 (0.02%)	4 (0.01%)	33 (0.07%)
Other race alone (NH)	37 (0.11%)	14 (0.04%)	34 (0.08%)	50 (0.11%)	94 (0.19%)
Mixed race or multiracial (NH)	—	—	298 (0.71%)	446 (0.97%)	1,378 (2.75%)
Hispanic or Latino (any race)	790 (2.27%)	1,023 (2.73%)	1,970 (4.66%)	3,432 (7.44%)	5,062 (10.11%)
Total	34,797 (100.00%)	37,447 (100.00%)	42,259 (100.00%)	46,102 (100.00%)	50,084 (100.00%)

=== 2024 estimate ===
As of the 2024 estimate, there were 51,156 people, 19,984 households, and _ families residing in the county. The population density was 968.25 inhabitants per square mile (373.8/km^{2}). There were 21,286 housing units at an average density of 21.98 per square mile (8.5/km^{2}). The racial makeup of the county was 94.3% White (84.2% NH White), 1.2% African American, 0.8% Native American, 1.6% Asian, 0.2% Pacific Islander, _% from some other races and 1.8% from two or more races. Hispanic or Latino people of any race were 11.2% of the population.

=== 2020 census ===
As of the 2020 census, there were 50,084 people, 19,590 households, and 12,196 families residing in the county. The population density was 51.73 inhabitants per square mile (20.0/km^{2}). There were 20,947 housing units at an average density of 21.63 per square mile (8.4/km^{2}). The racial makeup of the county was 86.58% White, 1.28% African American, 0.55% Native American, 1.34% Asian, 0.07% Pacific Islander, 4.34% from some other races and 5.84% from two or more races. Hispanic or Latino people of any race were 10.11% of the population.

The median age was 34.6 years. 24.1% of residents were under the age of 18 and 15.9% of residents were 65 years of age or older. For every 100 females there were 97.7 males, and for every 100 females age 18 and over there were 94.7 males age 18 and over.

68.9% of residents lived in urban areas, while 31.1% lived in rural areas.

There were 19,590 households in the county, of which 30.4% had children under the age of 18 living with them and 25.2% had a female householder with no spouse or partner present. About 29.6% of all households were made up of individuals and 10.7% had someone living alone who was 65 years of age or older.

There were 20,947 housing units, of which 6.5% were vacant. Among occupied housing units, 63.0% were owner-occupied and 37.0% were renter-occupied. The homeowner vacancy rate was 1.1% and the rental vacancy rate was 7.3%.

=== 2010 census ===
As of the 2010 census, there were 46,102 people, 18,037 households, and 11,425 families residing in the county. The population density was 47.61 inhabitants per square mile (18.4/km^{2}). There were 19,064 housing units at an average density of 19.69 per square mile (7.6/km^{2}). The racial makeup of the county was 92.72% White, 0.83% African American, 0.28% Native American, 1.29% Asian, 0.03% Pacific Islander, 3.50% from some other races and 1.35% from two or more races. Hispanic or Latino people of any race were 7.44% of the population.

=== 2000 census ===
As of the 2000 census, there were 42,259 people, 15,930 households, and 10,227 families residing in the county. The population density was 43.64 inhabitants per square mile (16.8/km^{2}). There were 16,830 housing units at an average density of 17.38 per square mile (6.7/km^{2}). The racial makeup of the county was 95.18% White, 0.55% African American, 0.33% Native American, 0.68% Asian, 0.03% Pacific Islander, 2.20% from some other races and 1.03% from two or more races. Hispanic or Latino people of any race were 4.66% of the population. 42.5% were of German, 8.1% Irish, 7.8% English, 6.8% American and 5.3% Swedish ancestry.

There were 15,930 households, out of which 32.70% had children under the age of 18 living with them, 52.90% were married couples living together, 8.30% had a female householder with no husband present, and 35.80% were non-families. 26.10% of all households were made up of individuals, and 9.60% had someone living alone who was 65 years of age or older. The average household size was 2.48 and the average family size was 3.02.

The county population contained 25.00% under the age of 18, 17.80% from 18 to 24, 26.60% from 25 to 44, 19.00% from 45 to 64, and 11.50% who were 65 years of age or older. The median age was 30 years. For every 100 females, there were 96.00 males. For every 100 females age 18 and over, there were 92.40 males.

The median income for a household in the county was $36,782, and the median income for a family was $46,247. Males had a median income of $30,182 versus $21,977 for females. The per capita income for the county was $17,510. About 6.30% of families and 11.20% of the population were below the poverty line, including 10.50% of those under age 18 and 8.50% of those age 65 or over.

== Communities ==
=== Cities ===
- Gibbon
- Kearney (county seat)
- Ravenna

=== Villages ===
- Amherst
- Elm Creek
- Miller
- Pleasanton
- Riverdale
- Shelton

=== Census-designated places ===
- Glenwood
- Odessa
- Poole

=== Unincorporated communities ===
- Buda
- Denman
- Prairie Center
- Saint Michael
- Sartoria
- Sweetwater

=== Townships ===
- Armada
- Beaver
- Cedar
- Center
- Cherry Creek
- Collins
- Divide
- Elm Creek
- Gardner
- Garfield
- Gibbon
- Grant
- Harrison
- Logan
- Loup
- Odessa
- Platte
- Riverdale
- Rusco
- Sartoria
- Schneider
- Scott
- Sharon
- Shelton
- Thornton
- Valley

== Politics ==
Buffalo County voters have been strongly Republican for decades. Only seven Democratic Party presidential candidates have won the county from 1880 to the present day, the most recent of which being Lyndon B. Johnson in 1964.

Political Party	Number of registered voters (April 1, 2026)	Percent
Republican	19,285	62.17%
Independent	5,859	18.89%
Democratic	5,190	16.73%
Libertarian	489	1.58%
Legal Marijuana Now	196	0.63%
Total	31,019	100.00%

United States presidential election results for Buffalo County, Nebraska
Year	Republican		Democratic		Third party(ies)	
Year	No.	%	No.	%	No.	%
1900	1,916	46.45%	2,056	49.84%	153	3.71%
1904	2,554	62.07%	731	17.76%	830	20.17%
1908	2,526	48.60%	2,520	48.49%	151	2.91%
1912	1,081	22.93%	2,061	43.72%	1,572	33.35%
1916	2,216	41.79%	2,877	54.25%	210	3.96%
1920	4,954	65.56%	2,258	29.88%	345	4.57%
1924	4,746	54.11%	2,337	26.64%	1,688	19.25%
1928	7,460	72.22%	2,801	27.12%	68	0.66%
1932	3,773	38.02%	5,872	59.18%	278	2.80%
1936	4,595	41.88%	6,002	54.70%	375	3.42%
1940	6,387	61.14%	4,060	38.86%	0	0.00%
1944	6,073	61.19%	3,852	38.81%	0	0.00%
1948	4,862	56.68%	3,716	43.32%	0	0.00%
1952	8,467	77.20%	2,501	22.80%	0	0.00%
1956	7,342	70.31%	3,100	29.69%	0	0.00%
1960	7,595	66.12%	3,891	33.88%	0	0.00%
1964	5,425	49.95%	5,436	50.05%	0	0.00%
1968	6,786	65.29%	2,875	27.66%	733	7.05%
1972	8,587	74.19%	2,988	25.81%	0	0.00%
1976	8,095	63.36%	4,308	33.72%	374	2.93%
1980	9,769	68.59%	3,167	22.24%	1,307	9.18%
1984	11,365	78.11%	3,086	21.21%	99	0.68%
1988	9,981	67.31%	4,702	31.71%	145	0.98%
1992	9,726	55.11%	3,747	21.23%	4,176	23.66%
1996	10,004	63.09%	4,277	26.97%	1,575	9.93%
2000	11,931	72.48%	3,927	23.86%	603	3.66%
2004	14,222	76.43%	4,100	22.03%	286	1.54%
2008	13,097	67.88%	5,867	30.41%	329	1.71%
2012	13,570	69.76%	5,365	27.58%	518	2.66%
2016	14,569	68.95%	4,763	22.54%	1,797	8.50%
2020	16,640	70.18%	6,350	26.78%	721	3.04%
2024	17,064	71.47%	6,386	26.75%	427	1.79%

== Education ==
School districts include:

- Amherst Public Schools #119, Amherst
- Ansley Public Schools #44, Ansley
- Centura Public Schools #100, Cairo
- Elm Creek Public Schools #9, Elm Creek
- Gibbon Public Schools #2, Gibbon
- Kearney Public Schools #7, Kearney
- Pleasanton Public Schools #105, Pleasanton
- Ravenna Public Schools #69, Ravenna
- Shelton Public Schools #19, Shelton
- Sumner-Eddyville-Miller Schools #101, Sumner

== See also ==
- National Register of Historic Places listings in Buffalo County, Nebraska
