= Harrison Township, Buffalo County, Nebraska =

Harrison Township
- Township
- Location in Buffalo County
- Coordinates: 41°00′15″N 099°22′07″W
- Country: United States
- State: Nebraska
- County: Buffalo

Area
  - Total: 35.81 sq mi (92.75 km^{2})
  - Land: 35.76 sq mi (92.62 km^{2})
  - Water: 0.050 sq mi (0.13 km^{2}) 0.14%
- Elevation: 2,290 ft (698 m)

Population (2000)
  - Total: 87
  - Density: 2.3/sq mi (0.9/km^{2})
- GNIS feature ID: 0838047

Harrison Township is one of twenty-six townships in Buffalo County, Nebraska, United States. The population was 87 at the 2000 census. A 2006 estimate placed the township's population at 86.

== See also ==
- County government in Nebraska
