= Sharon Township, Buffalo County, Nebraska =

Sharon Township
- Township
- Location in Buffalo County
- Coordinates: 40°49′44″N 098°46′24″W
- Country: United States
- State: Nebraska
- County: Buffalo

Area
  - Total: 35.93 sq mi (93.06 km^{2})
  - Land: 35.93 sq mi (93.06 km^{2})
  - Water: 0 sq mi (0 km^{2}) 0%
- Elevation: 2,028 ft (618 m)

Population (2000)
  - Total: 150
  - Density: 4.1/sq mi (1.6/km^{2})
- GNIS feature ID: 0838240

Sharon Township is one of twenty-six townships in Buffalo County, Nebraska, United States. The population was 150 at the 2000 census. A 2006 estimate placed the township's population at 147.

== See also ==
- County government in Nebraska
