= Beaver Township, Buffalo County, Nebraska =

Beaver Township
- Township
- Location in Buffalo County
- Coordinates: 41°00′30″N 099°00′18″W
- Country: United States
- State: Nebraska
- County: Buffalo

Area
  - Total: 35.72 sq mi (92.52 km^{2})
  - Land: 35.60 sq mi (92.21 km^{2})
  - Water: 0.12 sq mi (0.3 km^{2}) 0.32%
- Elevation: 2,139 ft (652 m)

Population (2000)
  - Total: 166
  - Density: 4.7/sq mi (1.8/km^{2})
- GNIS feature ID: 0837870

Beaver Township is one of twenty-six townships in Buffalo County, Nebraska, United States. The population was 166 at the 2000 census. A 2006 estimate placed the township's population at 164.

== Village ==
- Sweetwater

== See also ==
- County government in Nebraska
