= Scott Township, Buffalo County, Nebraska =

Scott Township
- Township
- Location in Buffalo County
- Coordinates: 40°55′07″N 099°15′16″W
- Country: United States
- State: Nebraska
- County: Buffalo

Area
  - Total: 35.6 sq mi (92.2 km^{2})
  - Land: 35.6 sq mi (92.2 km^{2})
  - Water: 0 sq mi (0 km^{2}) 0%
- Elevation: 2,310 ft (704 m)

Population (2000)
  - Total: 98
  - Density: 2.8/sq mi (1.1/km^{2})
- GNIS feature ID: 0838236

Scott Township is one of twenty-six townships in Buffalo County, Nebraska, United States. The population was 98 at the 2000 census. A 2006 estimate placed the township's population at 96.

Scott Township was named for Benjamin Scott, a pioneer settler.

== See also ==
- County government in Nebraska
