= Cherry Creek Township, Buffalo County, Nebraska =

Cherry Creek Township
- Township
- Location in Buffalo County
- Coordinates: 40°59′52″N 098°46′48″W
- Country: United States
- State: Nebraska
- County: Buffalo

Area
  - Total: 35.9 sq mi (92.9 km^{2})
  - Land: 35.63 sq mi (92.29 km^{2})
  - Water: 0.24 sq mi (0.61 km^{2}) 0.66%
- Elevation: 2,005 ft (611 m)

Population (2000)
  - Total: 110
  - Density: 3.1/sq mi (1.2/km^{2})
- GNIS feature ID: 0837918

Cherry Creek Township is a township in Buffalo County, Nebraska, United States. It is one of twenty-six townships in the county. The population was 110 at the 2000 census. A 2006 estimate placed the township's population at 108.

== See also ==
- County government in Nebraska
