= Buda, Nebraska =

Unincorporated community in Nebraska, United States

- Unincorporated Community
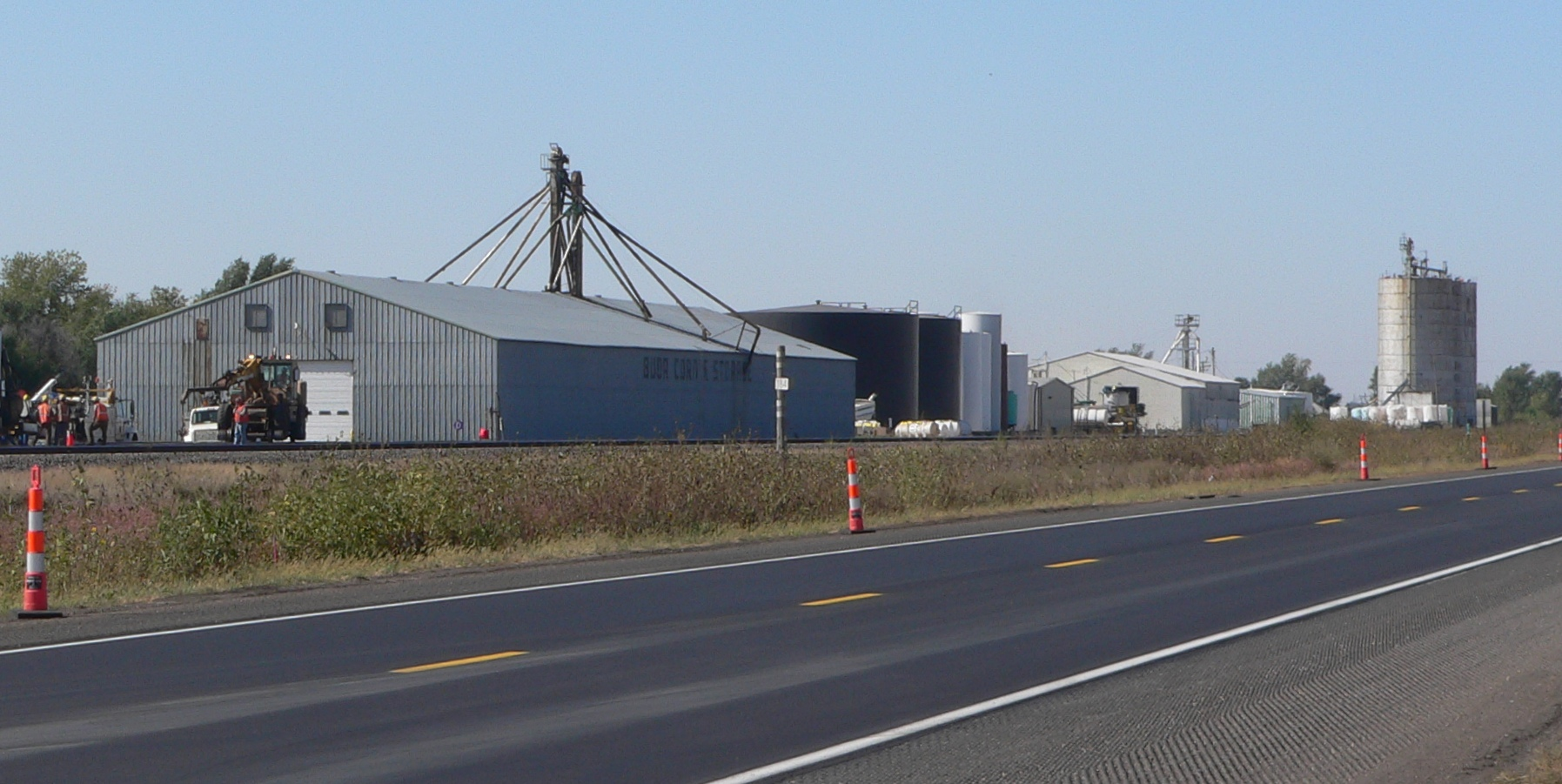

- Location within Nebraska Location within the United States
- Coordinates: 40.7142°N 98.9939°W
- Country: United States
- State: Nebraska
- County: Buffalo

Buda is an unincorporated community in Buffalo County, Nebraska, United States. First established as Kearney Station after the Union Pacific reached the area August 1, 1866 supplying freight and mail for Fort Kearny five miles south across the Platte River. It was renamed Shelby in 1876 and then Buda in 1878 after Buda the former capital of the Kingdom of Hungary.
