= Odessa Township, Buffalo County, Nebraska =

Odessa Township
- Township
- Location in Buffalo County
- Coordinates: 40°43′21″N 099°15′14″W
- Country: United States
- State: Nebraska
- County: Buffalo

Area
  - Total: 50.24 sq mi (130.12 km^{2})
  - Land: 49.53 sq mi (128.27 km^{2})
  - Water: 0.71 sq mi (1.85 km^{2}) 1.42%
- Elevation: 2,277 ft (694 m)

Population (2000)
  - Total: 398
  - Density: 8.0/sq mi (3.1/km^{2})
- GNIS feature ID: 0838172

Odessa Township is a civil township in Buffalo County, Nebraska, United States. The census-designated place of Odessa is located in the south-central part of the township. The township is in the Central Standard Time Zone.

The latitude of Odessa Township is 40.722° N; the longitude is 99.253° W. The population was 398 at the 2000 census. A 2006 estimate placed the township's population at 391.

== Attractions ==
Union Pacific State Recreation Area - Boating, fishing and camping areas.
