= Schneider Township, Buffalo County, Nebraska =

Schneider Township
- Township
- Location in Buffalo County
- Coordinates: 40°54′45″N 098°53′22″W
- Country: United States
- State: Nebraska
- County: Buffalo

Area
  - Total: 35.8 sq mi (92.8 km^{2})
  - Land: 35.8 sq mi (92.8 km^{2})
  - Water: 0 sq mi (0 km^{2}) 0%
- Elevation: 2,119 ft (646 m)

Population (2000)
  - Total: 167
  - Density: 4.7/sq mi (1.8/km^{2})
- GNIS feature ID: 0838234

Schneider Township is one of twenty-six townships in Buffalo County, Nebraska, United States. The population was 167 at the 2000 census. A 2006 estimate placed the township's population at 164.

== See also ==
- County government in Nebraska
