= Garfield Township, Buffalo County, Nebraska =

Garfield Township
- Township
- Location in Buffalo County
- Coordinates: 41°00′16″N 098°53′09″W
- Country: United States
- State: Nebraska
- County: Buffalo

Area
  - Total: 35.07 sq mi (90.84 km^{2})
  - Land: 34.68 sq mi (89.81 km^{2})
  - Water: 0.40 sq mi (1.03 km^{2}) 1.13%
- Elevation: 2,030 ft (620 m)

Population (2000)
  - Total: 270
  - Density: 7.8/sq mi (3/km^{2})
- GNIS feature ID: 0838017

Garfield Township is one of twenty-six townships in Buffalo County, Nebraska, United States. The population was 270 at the 2000 census. A 2006 estimate placed the township's population at 266.

== See also ==
- County government in Nebraska
