= Valley Township, Buffalo County, Nebraska =

Valley Township
- Township
- Location in Buffalo County
- Coordinates: 40°49′40″N 098°54′03″W
- Country: United States
- State: Nebraska
- County: Buffalo

Area
  - Total: 35.85 sq mi (92.86 km^{2})
  - Land: 35.85 sq mi (92.86 km^{2})
  - Water: 0 sq mi (0 km^{2}) 0%
- Elevation: 2,201 ft (671 m)

Population (2000)
  - Total: 158
  - Density: 4.4/sq mi (1.7/km^{2})
- GNIS feature ID: 0838301

Valley Township is a township in Buffalo County, Nebraska, United States. It is one of twenty-six townships in the county. The population was 158 at the 2000 census. A 2006 estimate placed the township's population at 156.

== See also ==
- County government in Nebraska
