= Collins Township, Buffalo County, Nebraska =

Collins Township
- Township
- Location in Buffalo County
- Coordinates: 40°41′28″N 099°08′37″W
- Country: United States
- State: Nebraska
- County: Buffalo

Area
  - Total: 24.99 sq mi (64.72 km^{2})
  - Land: 24.08 sq mi (62.36 km^{2})
  - Water: 0.91 sq mi (2.36 km^{2}) 3.65%
- Elevation: 2,182 ft (665 m)

Population (2000)
  - Total: 1,589
  - Density: 66/sq mi (25.5/km^{2})
- GNIS feature ID: 0837931

Collins Township is one of twenty-six townships in Buffalo County, Nebraska, United States. The population was 1,589 at the 2000 census. A 2006 estimate placed the township's population at 1,578.

== See also ==
- County government in Nebraska
