= Gardner Township, Buffalo County, Nebraska =

Gardner Township
- Township
- Location in Buffalo County
- Coordinates: 40°54′43″N 098°46′24″W
- Country: United States
- State: Nebraska
- County: Buffalo

Area
  - Total: 35.84 sq mi (92.83 km^{2})
  - Land: 35.84 sq mi (92.83 km^{2})
  - Water: 0 sq mi (0 km^{2}) 0%
- Elevation: 2,126 ft (648 m)

Population (2000)
  - Total: 129
  - Density: 3.6/sq mi (1.4/km^{2})
- GNIS feature ID: 0838015

Gardner Township is one of twenty-six townships in Buffalo County, Nebraska, United States. The population was 129 at the 2000 census. A 2006 estimate placed the township's population at 127.

== See also ==
- County government in Nebraska
