= Prairie Center, Nebraska =

Unincorporated community in Nebraska, U.S.

Coordinates: 40°51′32″N 99°03′18″W

Prairie Center is an unincorporated community in Buffalo County, Nebraska, United States.

== History ==
A post office was established at Prairie Center in 1874, and remained in operation until it was discontinued in 1902. The name of the post office was spelled Prairie Centre until 1893.
