= Cedar Township, Buffalo County, Nebraska =

Cedar Township
- Township
- Location in Buffalo County
- Coordinates: 40°55′07″N 099°00′58″W
- Country: United States
- State: Nebraska
- County: Buffalo

Area
  - Total: 35.77 sq mi (92.64 km^{2})
  - Land: 35.77 sq mi (92.64 km^{2})
  - Water: 0 sq mi (0 km^{2}) 0%
- Elevation: 2,200 ft (670 m)

Population (2000)
  - Total: 195
  - Density: 5.4/sq mi (2.1/km^{2})
- GNIS feature ID: 0837904

Cedar Township is one of 26 townships in Buffalo County, Nebraska, USA. The population was 195 at the 2000 census. A 2006 estimate placed the township's population at 192.

== See also ==
- County government in Nebraska
