= Armada Township, Buffalo County, Nebraska =

Armada Township
- Township
- Location in Buffalo County
- Coordinates: 40°55′24″N 099°21′55″W
- Country: United States
- State: Nebraska
- County: Buffalo

Area
  - Total: 35.41 sq mi (91.72 km^{2})
  - Land: 35.38 sq mi (91.64 km^{2})
  - Water: 0.031 sq mi (0.08 km^{2}) 0.09%
- Elevation: 2,310 ft (704 m)

Population (2000)
  - Total: 261
  - Density: 7.3/sq mi (2.8/km^{2})
- GNIS feature ID: 0837859

Armada Township is one of twenty-six townships in Buffalo County, Nebraska, United States. The population was 261 at the 2000 census. By 2015, the population was estimated to be 305.

The Village of Miller lies within the Township. The zip code is 68858.

== See also ==
- County government in Nebraska
