= Platte Township, Buffalo County, Nebraska =

Platte Township
- Township
- Location in Buffalo County
- Coordinates: 40°41′05″N 098°50′18″W
- Country: United States
- State: Nebraska
- County: Buffalo

Area
  - Total: 25.47 sq mi (65.97 km^{2})
  - Land: 23.25 sq mi (60.23 km^{2})
  - Water: 2.22 sq mi (5.74 km^{2}) 8.7%
- Elevation: 2,054 ft (626 m)

Population (2000)
  - Total: 290
  - Density: 12/sq mi (4.8/km^{2})
- GNIS feature ID: 0838188

Platte Township is one of twenty-six townships in Buffalo County, Nebraska, United States. The population was 290 at the 2000 census. A 2006 estimate placed the township's population at 286.

== See also ==
- County government in Nebraska
