= Shelton Township, Buffalo County, Nebraska =

Shelton Township
- Township
- Location in Buffalo County
- Coordinates: 40°44′31″N 098°47′00″W
- Country: United States
- State: Nebraska
- County: Buffalo

Area
  - Total: 31.15 sq mi (80.67 km^{2})
  - Land: 30.97 sq mi (80.21 km^{2})
  - Water: 0.18 sq mi (0.47 km^{2}) 0.58%
- Elevation: 2,037 ft (621 m)

Population (2000)
  - Total: 1,497
  - Density: 48/sq mi (18.7/km^{2})
- GNIS feature ID: 0838242

Shelton Township is one of twenty-six townships in Buffalo County, Nebraska, United States. The population was 1,497 at the 2000 census. A 2006 estimate placed the township's population at 1,475.

The Village of Shelton lies within the Township.

== See also ==
- County government in Nebraska
