= Center Township, Buffalo County, Nebraska =

Center Township
- Township
- Location in Buffalo County
- Coordinates: 40°43′04″N 099°00′15″W
- Country: United States
- State: Nebraska
- County: Buffalo

Area
  - Total: 52.61 sq mi (136.27 km^{2})
  - Land: 51.73 sq mi (133.97 km^{2})
  - Water: 0.89 sq mi (2.3 km^{2}) 1.69%
- Elevation: 2,126 ft (648 m)

Population (2000)
  - Total: 623
  - Density: 12/sq mi (4.7/km^{2})
- GNIS feature ID: 0837906

Center Township is one of twenty-six townships in Buffalo County, Nebraska, United States. The population was 623 at the 2000 census. A 2006 estimate placed the township's population at 614. As of 2023, sources estimate a population of around 93, with most (75%) being 45 years old or older.

== See also ==
- County government in Nebraska
