= Newark Township, Kearney County, Nebraska =

Newark Township
- Township
- Location in Kearney County
- Coordinates: 40°37′48″N 098°59′39″W
- Country: United States
- State: Nebraska
- County: Kearney

Area
  - Total: 23.29 sq mi (60.33 km^{2})
  - Land: 23.29 sq mi (60.33 km^{2})
  - Water: 0 sq mi (0 km^{2}) 0%
- Elevation: 2,116 ft (645 m)

Population (2020)
  - Total: 204
  - Density: 8.76/sq mi (3.38/km^{2})
- GNIS feature ID: 0838155

Newark Township is one of fourteen townships in Kearney County, Nebraska, United States. The population was 204 at the 2020 census. A 2021 estimate placed the township's population at 203.

== See also ==
- County government in Nebraska
