= Elm Township, Antelope County, Nebraska =

Elm Township
- Township
- Location in Antelope County
- Coordinates: 42°08′03″N 097°53′14″W
- Country: United States
- State: Nebraska
- County: Antelope

Area
  - Total: 35.80 sq mi (92.72 km^{2})
  - Land: 35.80 sq mi (92.71 km^{2})
  - Water: 0.0039 sq mi (0.01 km^{2}) 0.01%
- Elevation: 1,788 ft (545 m)

Population (2010)
  - Total: 82
  - Density: 2.3/sq mi (0.9/km^{2})
- GNIS feature ID: 0837986

Elm Township is one of twenty-four townships in Antelope County, Nebraska, United States. The population was 82 at the 2010 census.

== See also ==
- County government in Nebraska
