= Riverdale, Nebraska =

Village in Nebraska, US

- Village
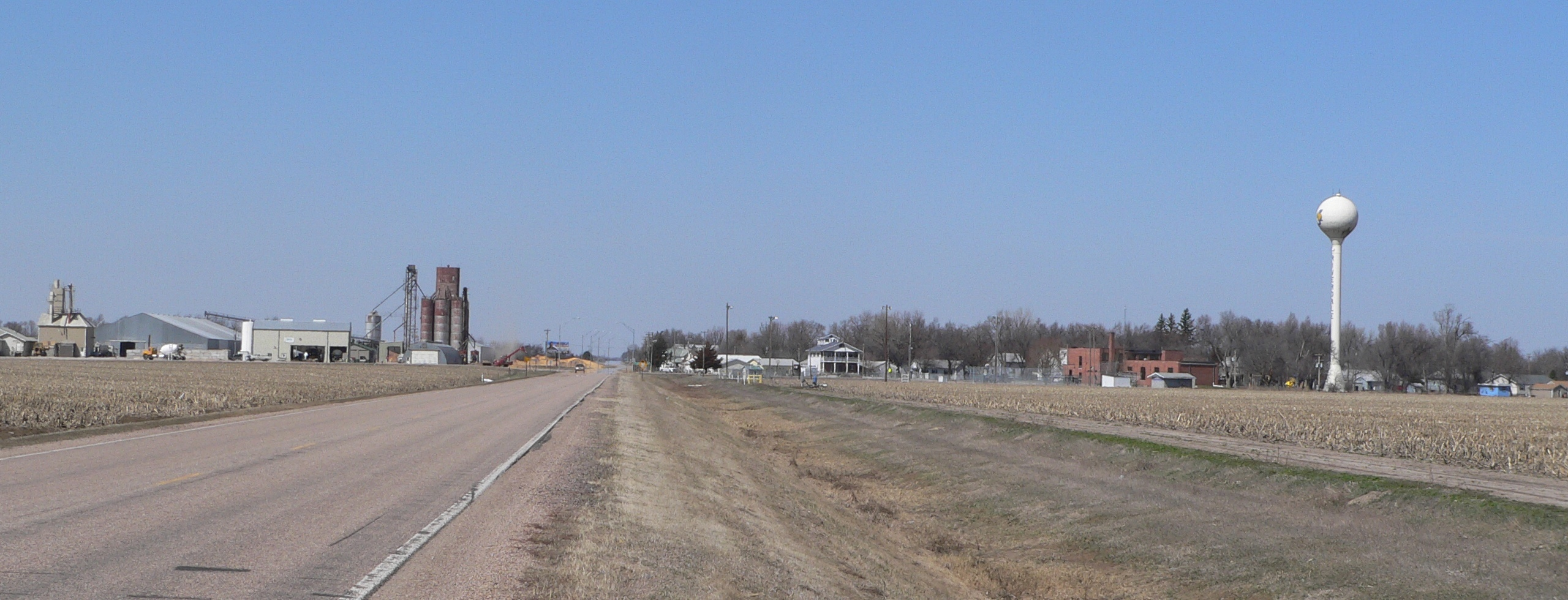
- Riverdale seen from the southeast along Nebraska Highway 40

- Location of Riverdale, Nebraska
- Coordinates: 40°47′02″N 99°09′38″W
- Country: United States
- State: Nebraska
- County: Buffalo

Area
  - Total: 0.26 sq mi (0.68 km^{2})
  - Land: 0.26 sq mi (0.68 km^{2})
  - Water: 0 sq mi (0.00 km^{2})
- Elevation: 2,182 ft (665 m)

Population (2020)
  - Total: 247
  - Density: 936.0/sq mi (361.41/km^{2})
- Time zone: UTC-6 (Central (CST))
  - Summer (DST): UTC-5 (CDT)
- ZIP code: 68870
- Area code: 308
- FIPS code: 31-41515
- GNIS feature ID: 2399087
- Website: www.68870.com

Riverdale is a village in Buffalo County, in the state of Nebraska, in the Midwestern United States. It is part of the Kearney, Nebraska Micropolitan Statistical Area. As of the 2020 census, Riverdale had a population of 247.

== History ==
Riverdale was laid out in 1890 when the Kearney and Black Hills Railway was extended to that point. It was named from its scenic setting in the valley of the Platte River.

== Geography ==
According to the United States Census Bureau, the village has a total area of 0.26 square miles (0.67 km^{2}), all land.

== Demographics ==
Historical population
| Census | Pop. | Note | %± |
|---|---|---|---|
| 1930 | 129 | | — |
| 1940 | 121 | | −6.2% |
| 1950 | 134 | | 10.7% |
| 1960 | 144 | | 7.5% |
| 1970 | 155 | | 7.6% |
| 1980 | 204 | | 31.6% |
| 1990 | 208 | | 2.0% |
| 2000 | 213 | | 2.4% |
| 2010 | 182 | | −14.6% |
| 2020 | 247 | | 35.7% |
U.S. Decennial Census

=== 2010 census ===
As of the census of 2010, there were 182 people, 73 households, and 54 families living in the village. The population density was 700.0 inhabitants per square mile (270.3/km^{2}). There were 88 housing units at an average density of 338.5 per square mile (130.7/km^{2}). The racial makeup of the village was 97.8% White and 2.2% from two or more races. Hispanic or Latino of any race were 0.5% of the population.

There were 73 households, of which 35.6% had children under the age of 18 living with them, 67.1% were married couples living together, 4.1% had a female householder with no husband present, 2.7% had a male householder with no wife present, and 26.0% were non-families. 19.2% of all households were made up of individuals, and 13.7% had someone living alone who was 65 years of age or older. The average household size was 2.49 and the average family size was 2.85.

The median age in the village was 37.6 years. 23.1% of residents were under the age of 18; 5.4% were between the ages of 18 and 24; 31.8% were from 25 to 44; 24.1% were from 45 to 64; and 15.4% were 65 years of age or older. The gender makeup of the village was 49.5% male and 50.5% female.

=== 2000 census ===
As of the census of 2000, there were 213 people, 83 households, and 65 families living in the village. The population density was 806.0 inhabitants per square mile (311.2/km^{2}). There were 84 housing units at an average density of 317.9 per square mile (122.7/km^{2}). The racial makeup of the village was 99.53% White, and 0.47% from two or more races.

There were 83 households, out of which 28.9% had children under the age of 18 living with them, 66.3% were married couples living together, 10.8% had a female householder with no husband present, and 20.5% were non-families. 19.3% of all households were made up of individuals, and 7.2% had someone living alone who was 65 years of age or older. The average household size was 2.57 and the average family size was 2.89.

In the village, the population was spread out, with 23.9% under the age of 18, 9.9% from 18 to 24, 30.5% from 25 to 44, 24.4% from 45 to 64, and 11.3% who were 65 years of age or older. The median age was 36 years. For every 100 females, there were 110.9 males. For every 100 females age 18 and over, there were 102.5 males.

As of 2000 the median income for a household in the village was $44,375, and the median income for a family was $46,786. Males had a median income of $29,219 versus $19,861 for females. The per capita income for the village was $16,459. About 3.8% of families and 7.8% of the population were below the poverty line, including 17.9% of those under the age of eighteen and none of those 65 or over.
