= Rusco Township, Buffalo County, Nebraska =

Rusco Township
- Township
- Location in Buffalo County
- Coordinates: 40°54′59″N 099°07′54″W
- Country: United States
- State: Nebraska
- County: Buffalo

Area
  - Total: 41.71 sq mi (108.04 km^{2})
  - Land: 41.70 sq mi (107.99 km^{2})
  - Water: 0.019 sq mi (0.05 km^{2}) 0.05%
- Elevation: 2,175 ft (663 m)

Population (2000)
  - Total: 233
  - Density: 5.7/sq mi (2.2/km^{2})
- GNIS feature ID: 0838221

Rusco Township is one of twenty-six townships in Buffalo County, Nebraska, United States. The population was 233 at the 2000 census. A 2006 estimate placed the township's population at 230.

== See also ==
- County government in Nebraska
