= Divide Township, Buffalo County, Nebraska =

Divide Township
- Township
- Location in Buffalo County
- Coordinates: 40°49′40″N 099°07′33″W
- Country: United States
- State: Nebraska
- County: Buffalo

Area
  - Total: 41.92 sq mi (108.57 km^{2})
  - Land: 41.91 sq mi (108.54 km^{2})
  - Water: 0.012 sq mi (0.03 km^{2}) 0.03%
- Elevation: 2,238 ft (682 m)

Population (2000)
  - Total: 353
  - Density: 8.5/sq mi (3.3/km^{2})
- GNIS feature ID: 0837963

Divide Township is one of twenty-six townships in Buffalo County, Nebraska, United States. The population was 353 at the 2000 census. A 2006 estimate placed the township's population at 347.

A small portion of the Village of Riverdale lies within the Township.

== See also ==
- County government in Nebraska
