= Sartoria Township, Buffalo County, Nebraska =

Sartoria Township
- Township
- Location in Buffalo County
- Coordinates: 41°00′05″N 099°15′16″W
- Country: United States
- State: Nebraska
- County: Buffalo

Area
  - Total: 35.93 sq mi (93.06 km^{2})
  - Land: 35.90 sq mi (92.99 km^{2})
  - Water: 0.027 sq mi (0.07 km^{2}) 0.08%
- Elevation: 2,170 ft (660 m)

Population (2000)
  - Total: 101
  - Density: 2.8/sq mi (1.1/km^{2})
- GNIS feature ID: 0838231

Sartoria Township is one of twenty-six townships in Buffalo County, Nebraska, United States. The population was 101 at the 2000 census. A 2006 estimate placed the township's population at 99.

== See also ==
- County government in Nebraska
