= Gibbon Township, Buffalo County, Nebraska =

Gibbon Township
- Township
- Location in Buffalo County
- Coordinates: 40°44′20″N 098°53′14″W
- Country: United States
- State: Nebraska
- County: Buffalo

Area
  - Total: 39.87 sq mi (103.25 km^{2})
  - Land: 39.8 sq mi (103.1 km^{2})
  - Water: 0.062 sq mi (0.16 km^{2}) 0.15%
- Elevation: 2,077 ft (633 m)

Population (2000)
  - Total: 2,083
  - Density: 52/sq mi (20.2/km^{2})
- GNIS feature ID: 0838025

Gibbon Township is one of twenty-six townships in Buffalo County, Nebraska, United States. Its population was 1922 at the 2024 census, down from 2083 at the 2000 census. 2006 estimates placed the township's population at 2,093.

The City of Gibbon lies within the Township.

== See also ==
- County government in Nebraska
