= Divide Township, Phelps County, Nebraska =

Divide Township
- Township
- Location in Phelps County
- Coordinates: 40°28′58″N 099°14′18″W
- Country: United States
- State: Nebraska
- County: Phelps

Area
  - Total: 39.40 sq mi (102.04 km^{2})
  - Land: 39.40 sq mi (102.04 km^{2})
  - Water: 0 sq mi (0 km^{2}) 0%
- Elevation: 2,230 ft (680 m)

Population (2000)
  - Total: 387
  - Density: 9.8/sq mi (3.8/km^{2})
- GNIS feature ID: 0837964

Divide Township is one of fourteen townships in Phelps County, Nebraska, United States. The population was 387 at the 2000 census. A 2006 estimate placed the township's population at 378.

The Village of Funk lies within the Township.
