= Elm Creek Township, Buffalo County, Nebraska =

Elm Creek Township
- Township
- Location in Buffalo County
- Coordinates: 40°43′26″N 099°22′03″W
- Country: United States
- State: Nebraska
- County: Buffalo

Area
  - Total: 49.14 sq mi (127.28 km^{2})
  - Land: 47.96 sq mi (124.22 km^{2})
  - Water: 1.19 sq mi (3.07 km^{2}) 2.41%
- Elevation: 2,267 ft (691 m)

Population (2000)
  - Total: 1,241
  - Density: 26/sq mi (10/km^{2})
- GNIS feature ID: 0837988

Elm Creek Township is a township in Buffalo County, Nebraska. It is one of twenty-six townships in the county. Its population in a 2006 estimate was 1,202. The population was 1,241 at the 2000 census.

The Village of Elm Creek lies within the Township.

== See also ==
- County government in Nebraska
