= Amherst, Nebraska =

Village in Nebraska, US

- Village
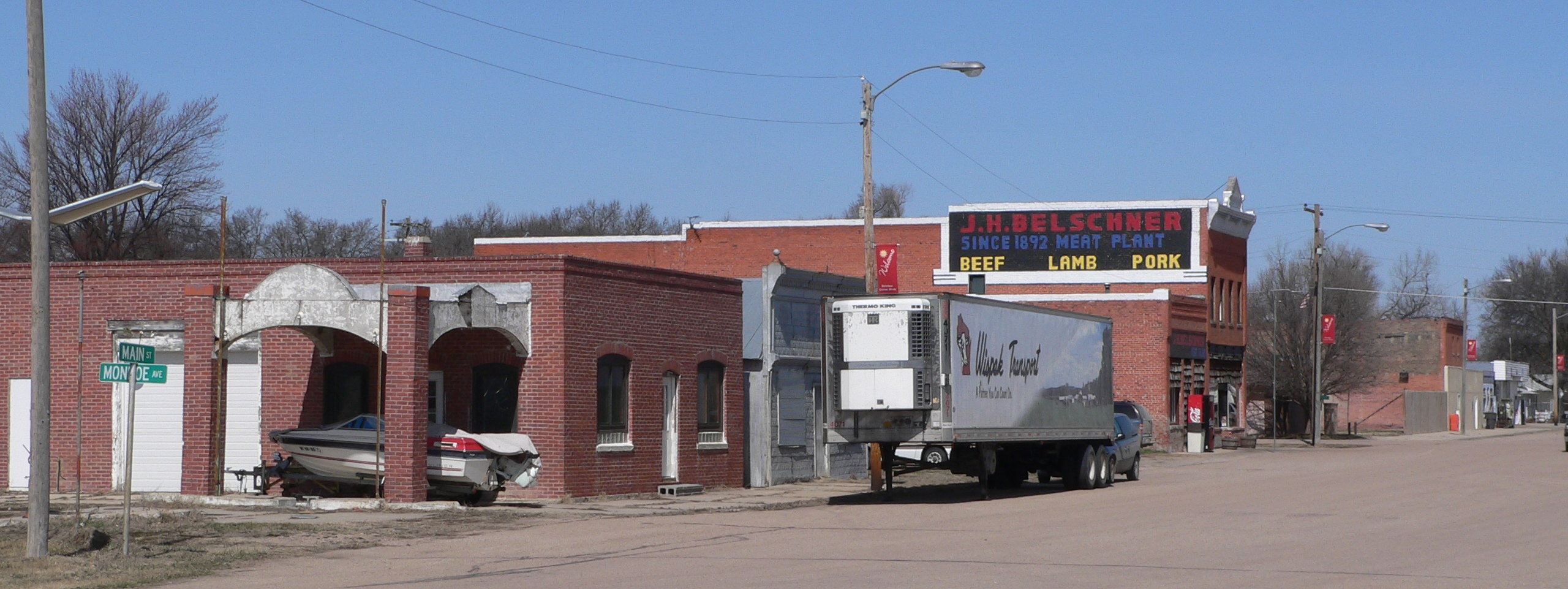
- Main Street in Amherst; seen from southeast

- Location of Amherst, Nebraska
- Coordinates: 40°50′18″N 99°16′10″W
- Country: United States
- State: Nebraska
- County: Buffalo

Area
  - Total: 0.22 sq mi (0.57 km^{2})
  - Land: 0.22 sq mi (0.57 km^{2})
  - Water: 0 sq mi (0.00 km^{2})
- Elevation: 2,234 ft (681 m)

Population (2020)
  - Total: 201
  - Density: 920.5/sq mi (355.39/km^{2})
- Time zone: UTC-6 (Central (CST))
  - Summer (DST): UTC-5 (CDT)
- ZIP code: 68812
- Area code: 308
- FIPS code: 31-01290
- GNIS feature ID: 2397957

Amherst is a village in Buffalo County, Nebraska, United States. It is part of the Kearney, Nebraska Micropolitan Statistical Area. As of the 2020 census, Amherst had a population of 201.

== History ==
Amherst was laid out and platted on its present site in 1890 when the railroad was built through that territory. It was named after Amherst College, in Massachusetts. Amherst was incorporated as a village in 1894.

== Geography ==
According to the United States Census Bureau, the village has a total area of 0.22 square miles (0.57 km^{2}), all land.

== Demographics ==
Historical population
| Census | Pop. | Note | %± |
|---|---|---|---|
| 1900 | 183 | | — |
| 1910 | 256 | | 39.9% |
| 1920 | 259 | | 1.2% |
| 1930 | 262 | | 1.2% |
| 1940 | 238 | | −9.2% |
| 1950 | 219 | | −8.0% |
| 1960 | 220 | | 0.5% |
| 1970 | 259 | | 17.7% |
| 1980 | 269 | | 3.9% |
| 1990 | 231 | | −14.1% |
| 2000 | 277 | | 19.9% |
| 2010 | 248 | | −10.5% |
| 2020 | 201 | | −19.0% |
U.S. Decennial Census

=== 2010 census ===
As of the census of 2010, there were 248 people, 108 households, and 68 families living in the village. The population density was 1,127.3 inhabitants per square mile (435.3/km^{2}). There were 114 housing units at an average density of 518.2 per square mile (200.1/km^{2}). The racial makeup of the village was 98.4% White, 0.8% Native American, 0.4% Asian, and 0.4% from two or more races. Hispanic or Latino of any race were 2.0% of the population.

There were 108 households, of which 28.7% had children under the age of 18 living with them, 55.6% were married couples living together, 2.8% had a female householder with no husband present, 4.6% had a male householder with no wife present, and 37.0% were non-families. 33.3% of all households were made up of individuals, and 12% had someone living alone who was 65 years of age or older. The average household size was 2.30 and the average family size was 2.81.

The median age in the village was 40.3 years. 22.6% of residents were under the age of 18; 7.5% were between the ages of 18 and 24; 24.6% were from 25 to 44; 27.4% were from 45 to 64; and 17.7% were 65 years of age or older. The gender makeup of the village was 51.2% male and 48.8% female.

=== 2000 census ===
As of the census of 2000, there were 277 people, 110 households, and 81 families living in the village. The population density was 1,262.6 inhabitants per square mile (487.5/km^{2}). There were 117 housing units at an average density of 533.3 per square mile (205.9/km^{2}). The racial makeup of the village was 98.92% White, 0.36% Native American, 0.36% Asian, and 0.36% from two or more races.

There were 110 households, out of which 38.2% had children under the age of 18 living with them, 63.6% were married couples living together, 5.5% had a female householder with no husband present, and 25.5% were non-families. 20.9% of all households were made up of individuals, and 11.8% had someone living alone who was 65 years of age or older. The average household size was 2.52 and the average family size was 2.94.

In the village, the population was spread out, with 27.1% under the age of 18, 4.3% from 18 to 24, 26.7% from 25 to 44, 22.7% from 45 to 64, and 19.1% who were 65 years of age or older. The median age was 42 years. For every 100 females, there were 99.3 males. For every 100 females age 18 and over, there were 102.0 males.

As of 2000 the median income for a household in the village was $39,545, and the median income for a family was $41,875. Males had a median income of $28,333 versus $17,679 for females. The per capita income for the village was $15,754. About 4.5% of families and 6.7% of the population were below the poverty line, including 12.5% of those under the age of eighteen and 3.2% of those 65 or over.
