= Miller, Nebraska =

Village in Nebraska, US

- Village
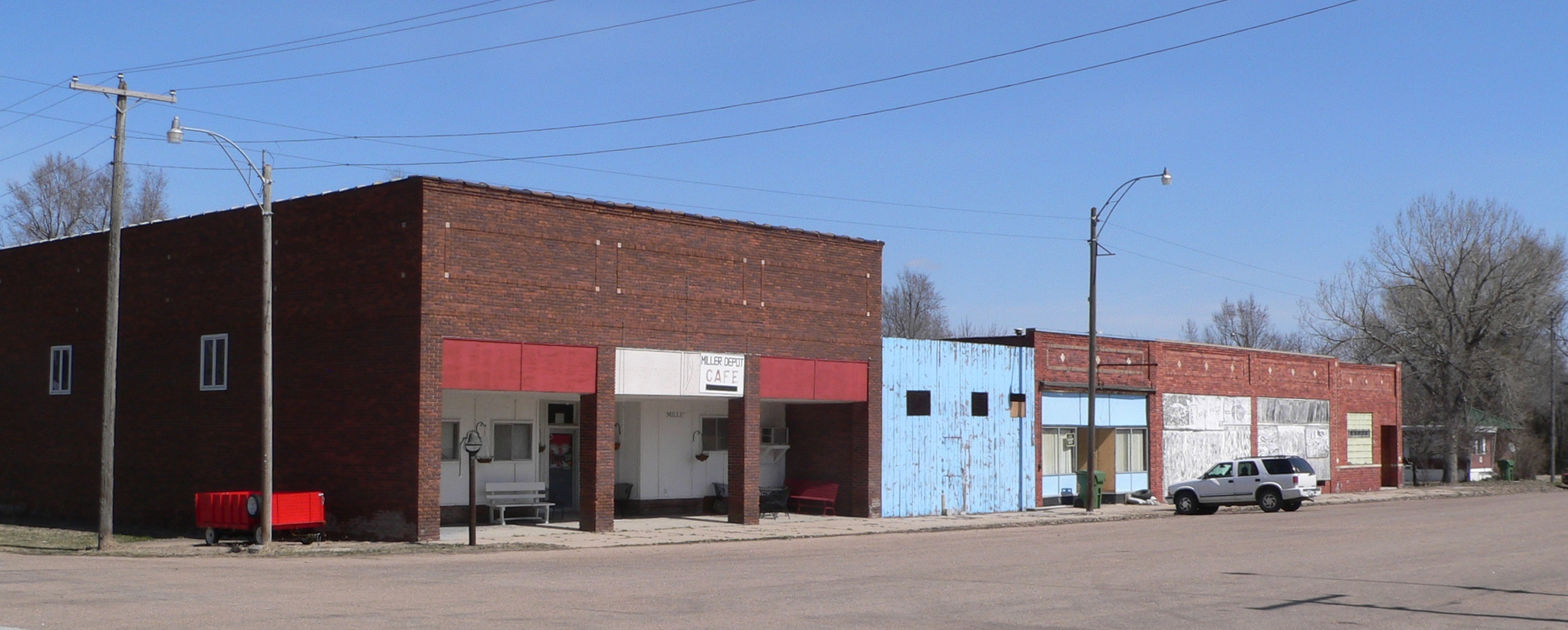
- Downtown Miller

- Location of Miller, Nebraska
- Coordinates: 40°55′39″N 99°23′24″W
- Country: United States
- State: Nebraska
- County: Buffalo

Area
  - Total: 0.38 sq mi (0.98 km^{2})
  - Land: 0.38 sq mi (0.98 km^{2})
  - Water: 0 sq mi (0.00 km^{2})
- Elevation: 2,316 ft (706 m)

Population (2020)
  - Total: 129
  - Density: 340.7/sq mi (131.54/km^{2})
- Time zone: UTC-6 (Central (CST))
  - Summer (DST): UTC-5 (CDT)
- ZIP code: 68858
- Area code: 308
- FIPS code: 31-32130
- GNIS feature ID: 2399355

Miller is a village in Buffalo County, Nebraska, United States. It is part of the Kearney, Nebraska Micropolitan Statistical Area. As of the 2020 census, Miller had a population of 129.

== History ==
Miller was laid out in its present site in 1890 when the railroad built through that territory. It was named for Dr. George L. Miller, who was instrumental in bringing the railroad to the area. Miller was incorporated as a village in 1890.

== Geography ==
According to the United States Census Bureau, the village has a total area of 0.38 square miles (0.98 km^{2}), all land.

== Demographics ==
Historical population
Census	Pop.	Note	%±
1900	194		—
1910	330		70.1%
1920	223		−32.4%
1930	263		17.9%
1940	205		−22.1%
1950	179		−12.7%
1960	137		−23.5%
1970	130		−5.1%
1980	147		13.1%
1990	130		−11.6%
2000	156		20.0%
2010	136		−12.8%
2020	129		−5.1%
U.S. Decennial Census

=== 2010 census ===
As of the census of 2010, there were 136 people, 59 households, and 34 families living in the village. The population density was 357.9 inhabitants per square mile (138.2/km^{2}). There were 66 housing units at an average density of 173.7 per square mile (67.1/km^{2}). The racial makeup of the village was 95.6% White and 4.4% from other races. Hispanic or Latino of any race were 6.6% of the population.

There were 59 households, of which 32.2% had children under the age of 18 living with them, 40.7% were married couples living together, 8.5% had a female householder with no husband present, 8.5% had a male householder with no wife present, and 42.4% were non-families. 35.6% of all households were made up of individuals, and 18.7% had someone living alone who was 65 years of age or older. The average household size was 2.31 and the average family size was 3.00.

The median age in the village was 41.3 years. 27.2% of residents were under the age of 18; 3% were between the ages of 18 and 24; 25.7% were from 25 to 44; 25.8% were from 45 to 64; and 18.4% were 65 years of age or older. The gender makeup of the village was 51.5% male and 48.5% female.

=== 2000 census ===
As of the census of 2000, there were 156 people, 64 households, and 38 families living in the village. The population density was 423.4 inhabitants per square mile (163.5/km^{2}). There were 72 housing units at an average density of 195.4 per square mile (75.4/km^{2}). The racial makeup of the village was 100.00% White.

There were 64 households, out of which 28.1% had children under the age of 18 living with them, 51.6% were married couples living together, 6.3% had a female householder with no husband present, and 39.1% were non-families. 31.3% of all households were made up of individuals, and 9.4% had someone living alone who was 65 years of age or older. The average household size was 2.44 and the average family size was 3.05.

In the village, the population was spread out, with 25.6% under the age of 18, 11.5% from 18 to 24, 26.3% from 25 to 44, 25.0% from 45 to 64, and 11.5% who were 65 years of age or older. The median age was 38 years. For every 100 females, there were 102.6 males. For every 100 females age 18 and over, there were 110.9 males.

The median income for a household in the village was $33,125, and the median income for a family was $36,875. Males had a median income of $35,000 versus $16,875 for females. The per capita income for the village was $13,968. None of the families and 4.1% of the population were living below the poverty line.
