= National Register of Historic Places listings in Kearney County, Nebraska =

Location of Kearney County in Nebraska

Kearney County, Nebraska, United States, has eight properties and districts listed on the National Register of Historic Places.

This National Park Service list is complete through NPS recent listings posted October 30, 2026.

== Current listings ==
	Name on the Register	Image	Date listed	Location	City or town	Description
1	Bethphage Mission	Bethphage Mission	April 24, 2013 (#13000199)	1044 23rd Road; 40°29′13″N 99°07′16″W	Axtell vicinity	
2	Eddie Eugene and Harriet Cotton Carpenter Farmstead	Eddie Eugene and Harriet Cotton Carpenter Farmstead	February 25, 1993 (#93000059)	Approximately 0.5 miles west of Lowell; 40°38′54″N 98°51′31″W	Lowell	
3	Dobytown	Dobytown	December 16, 1974 (#74001125)	Southwest of Kearney; 40°38′30″N 99°02′51″W	Kearney	
4	Fort Kearney	Fort Kearney	July 2, 1971 (#71000485)	2 miles west of Newark on Nebraska Highway 10; 40°38′36″N 99°00′25″W	Newark	
5	Kearney County Courthouse	Kearney County Courthouse	January 10, 1990 (#89002234)	5th St. between Colorado and Minden Aves. 40°29′56″N 98°56′53″W	Minden	
6	Salem Swedish Methodist Episcopal Church	Salem Swedish Methodist Episcopal Church	July 29, 1982 (#82003192)	Southwest of Axtell; 40°27′11″N 99°10′42″W	Axtell	
7	W. T. Thorne Building	W. T. Thorne Building	September 12, 1985 (#85002139)	5th St. 40°29′59″N 98°56′54″W	Minden	
8	US Post Office-Minden	US Post Office-Minden	May 11, 1992 (#92000471)	410 N. Minden St. 40°29′55″N 98°56′50″W	Minden	One of 12 Nebraska post offices featuring a Section of Fine Arts mural, "1848-Fort Kearney, Protectorate on the Overland Trail-1871" (1939) by William E. L. Bunn.

== See also ==
- List of National Historic Landmarks in Nebraska
- National Register of Historic Places listings in Nebraska
