= Nebraska Highway 44 =

State highway in Nebraska, U.S.

State Highway 44

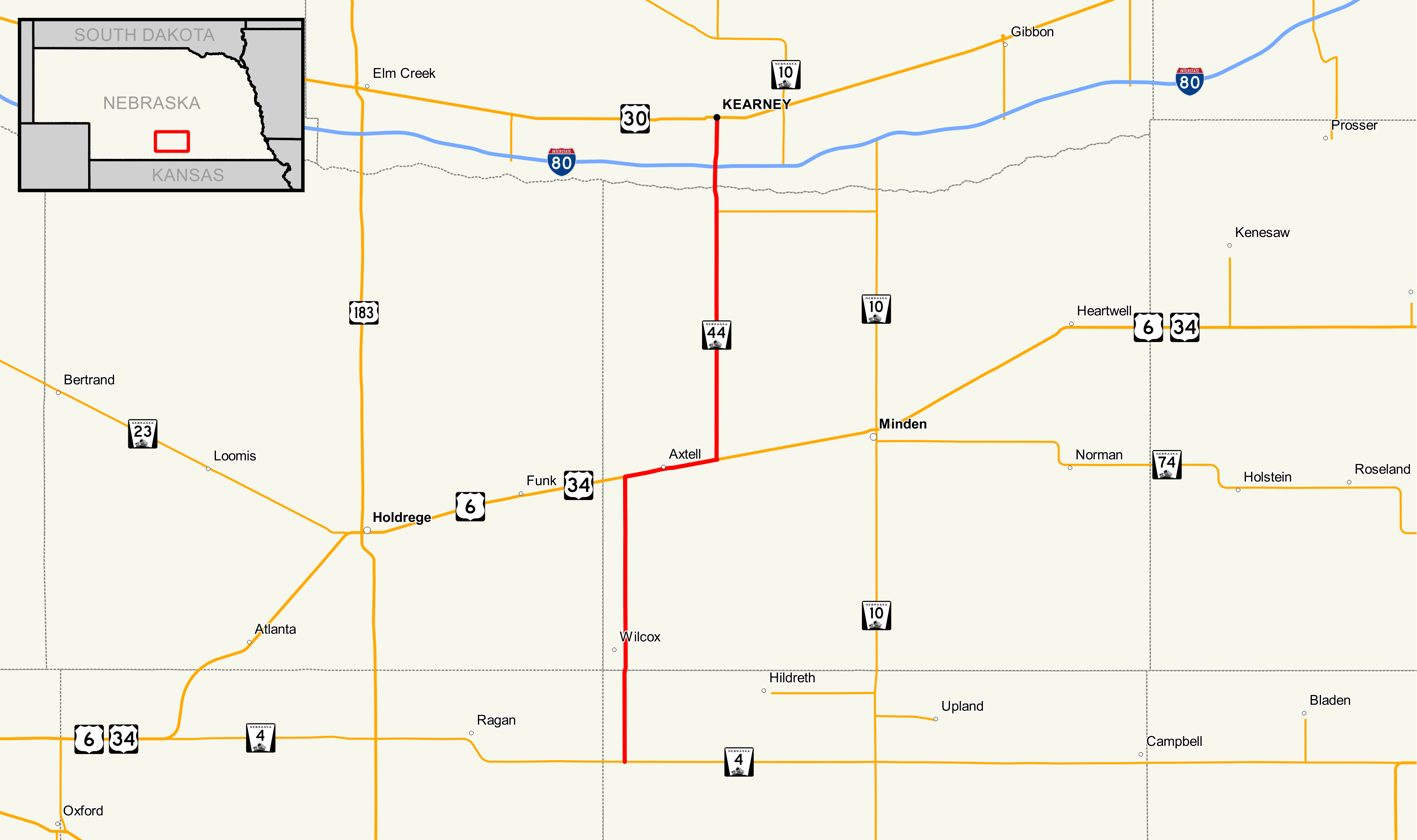
- Nebraska Highway 44 highlighted in red

Route information
- Maintained by NDOT
- Length: 29.47 mi (47.43 km)
- Existed: 1926–present

Major junctions
- South end: N-4 south of Wilcox
- US 6 / US 34 west of Axtell
- North end: I-80 in Kearney

Location
- Country: United States
- State: Nebraska
- Counties: Franklin, Kearney, Buffalo

Highway system
- Nebraska State Highway System; Interstate; US; State; Link; Spur; State Spurs; Recreation
← N-43	→ N-45

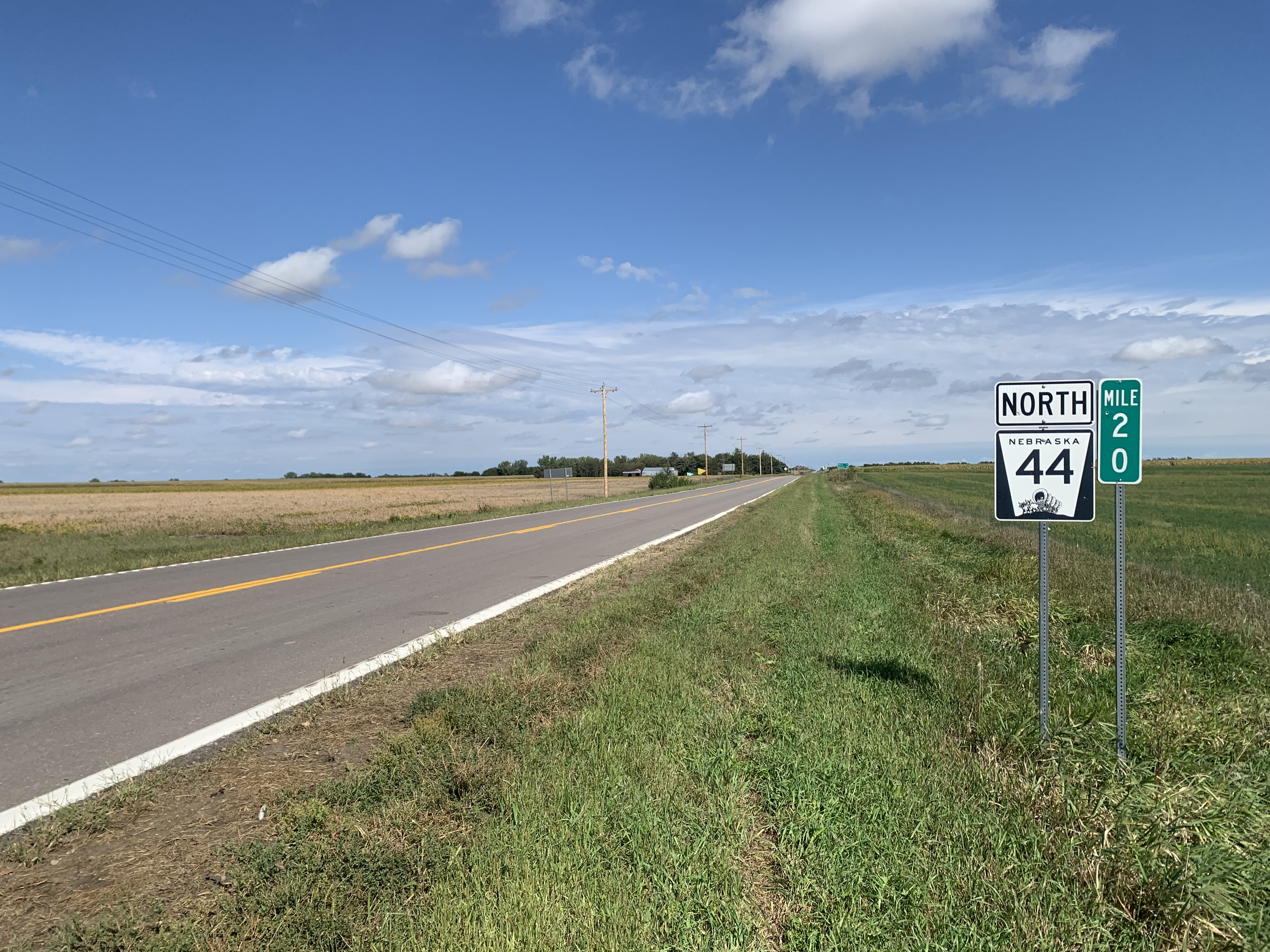
Nebraska Highway 44 in Franklin County, Nebraska

Nebraska Highway 44 (NE-44) is a 29.47-mile (47.43 km) highway in Franklin, Kearney, and Buffalo counties in Nebraska, United States. It runs in a south-to-north direction from Nebraska Highway 4 (NE-4) south of Wilcox to an intersection with Interstate 80 (I-80) in Kearney.

== Route description ==
NE-44 begins at an intersection with NE-4 south of Wilcox. It heads through farmland and passes through Wilcox, then meets U.S. Route 6/U.S. Route 6 (US 6/US 34), which are concurrent with each other. NE-44 then turns east with US 6/US 34 and passes through Axtell. East of Axtell, NE-44 turns north. Near Kearney, NE-44 meets Nebraska Link 50A, which serves as a link to Fort Kearny State Historical Park. Shortly after, NE-44 crosses the Platte River and becomes a divided highway. NE-44 then enters Kearney and meets Interstate 80, where it ends on the north side of the westbound I-80 ramps. The roadway continues north towards downtown Kearney as Second Avenue.

== Major intersections ==
County	Location	mi	km	Destinations	Notes
Franklin		0.00	0.00	N-4	Southern terminus; road continues as 21 Road
Kearney	Axtell	12.47	20.07	US 6 / US 34 west – Holdrege	Southern end of US 6/US 34 concurrency
Kearney	Axtell	16.55	26.63	US 6 / US 34 east – Minden	Northern end of US 6/US 34 concurrency
Kearney		27.39	44.08	L-50A east (V Road)	
Buffalo	Kearney	29.35	47.23	I-80 – Grand Island, North Platte	Northern terminus; road ends on the north side of I-80 Exit 272; roadway continues north as Second Ave toward downtown Kearney
1.000 mi = 1.609 km; 1.000 km = 0.621 mi: Concurrency terminus

== See also ==
- List of state highways in Nebraska
