= Eddie Eugene and Harriet Cotton Carpenter Farmstead =

Historic place in Nebraska, United States

- Carpenter, Eddie Eugene and Harriet Cotton, Farmstead
- U.S. National Register of Historic Places
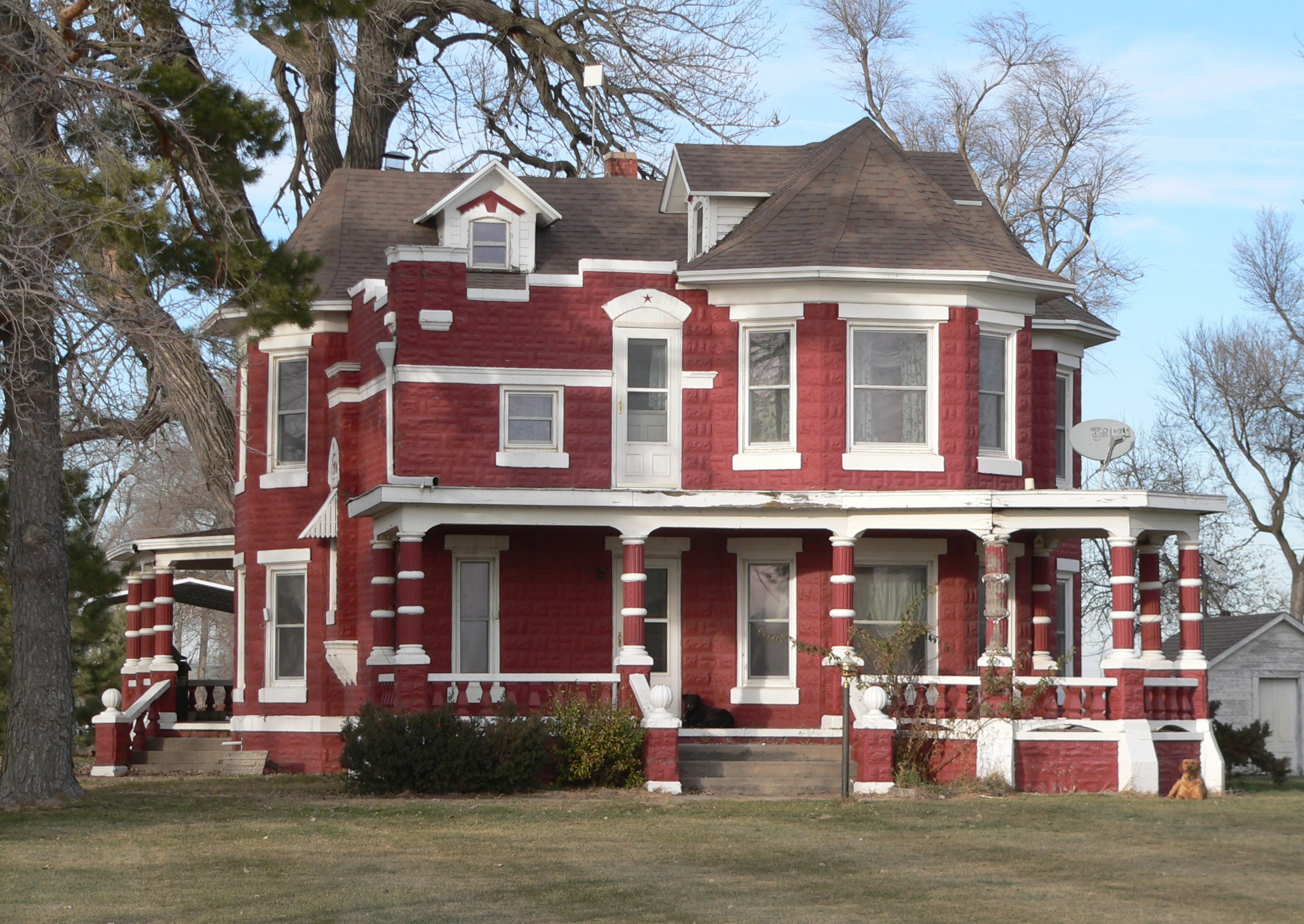
- The house in 2009

- Location within Nebraska Location within the United States
- Nearest city: Lowell, Nebraska
- Coordinates: 40°38′54″N 98°51′31″W
- Area: 4.9 acres (2.0 ha)
- Built by: E.E. Capenter
- Architectural style: Classical Revival, Queen Anne
- NRHP reference No.: 93000059
- Added to NRHP: February 25, 1993

The Eddie Eugene and Harriet Cotton Carpenter Farmstead is a historic estate in Lowell, Nebraska. The farmhouse was built in 1910 by Eddie Eugene Carpenter, a farmer. The property includes outbuildings like a barn and a windmill. Carpenter lived here with his wife, Harriet Cotton. The main house was designed in the Queen Anne architectural style, with a Classical Revival porch. It has been listed on the National Register of Historic Places since February 25, 1993.
