= Eaton Township, Kearney County, Nebraska =

Eaton Township
- Township
- Location in Kearney County
- Coordinates: 40°34′06″N 098°47′03″W
- Country: United States
- State: Nebraska
- County: Kearney

Area
  - Total: 35.9 sq mi (92.9 km^{2})
  - Land: 35.9 sq mi (92.9 km^{2})
  - Water: 0 sq mi (0 km^{2}) 0%
- Elevation: 2,093 ft (638 m)

Population (2020)
  - Total: 198
  - Density: 5.52/sq mi (2.13/km^{2})
- GNIS feature ID: 0837974

Eaton Township is one of fourteen townships in Kearney County, Nebraska, United States. The population was 198 at the 2020 census. A 2021 estimate placed the township's population at 196.

The Village of Heartwell lies within the Township.

== See also ==
- County government in Nebraska
