= May Township, Kearney County, Nebraska =

May Township
- Township
- Location in Kearney County
- Coordinates: 40°28′48″N 098°47′00″W
- Country: United States
- State: Nebraska
- County: Kearney

Area
  - Total: 36.00 sq mi (93.23 km^{2})
  - Land: 36.00 sq mi (93.23 km^{2})
  - Water: 0 sq mi (0 km^{2}) 0%
- Elevation: 2,073 ft (632 m)

Population (2020)
  - Total: 125
  - Density: 3.47/sq mi (1.34/km^{2})
- GNIS feature ID: 0838132

May Township is one of fourteen townships in Kearney County, Nebraska, United States. The population was 125 at the 2020 census. A 2021 estimate placed the township's population at 124.

The Village of Norman lies within the Township.

== See also ==
- County government in Nebraska
