= Mirage Township, Kearney County, Nebraska =

Mirage Township
- Township
- Location in Kearney County
- Coordinates: 40°28′51″N 099°07′16″W
- Country: United States
- State: Nebraska
- County: Kearney

Area
  - Total: 35.96 sq mi (93.14 km^{2})
  - Land: 35.96 sq mi (93.14 km^{2})
  - Water: 0 sq mi (0 km^{2}) 0%
- Elevation: 2,221 ft (677 m)

Population (2020)
  - Total: 882
  - Density: 24.5/sq mi (9.47/km^{2})
- GNIS feature ID: 0838141

Mirage Township is one of fourteen townships in Kearney County, Nebraska, United States. The population was 882 at the 2020 census. A 2021 estimate placed the township's population at 893.

The Village of Axtell lies within the Township.

== See also ==
- County government in Nebraska
