= Lincoln Township, Kearney County, Nebraska =

Lincoln Township
- Township
- Location in Kearney County
- Coordinates: 40°28′57″N 098°53′43″W
- Country: United States
- State: Nebraska
- County: Kearney

Area
  - Total: 36.02 sq mi (93.28 km^{2})
  - Land: 36.02 sq mi (93.28 km^{2})
  - Water: 0 sq mi (0 km^{2}) 0%
- Elevation: 2,139 ft (652 m)

Population (2020)
  - Total: 1,796
  - Density: 49.87/sq mi (19.25/km^{2})
- GNIS feature ID: 0838095

Lincoln Township is one of fourteen townships in Kearney County, Nebraska, United States. The population was 1,796 at the 2020 census. A 2021 estimate placed the township's population at 1,790.

A portion of the City of Minden lies within the Township.

== See also ==
- County government in Nebraska
