= Salem Swedish Methodist Episcopal Church =

Historic church in Nebraska, United States

- U.S. National Register of Historic Places
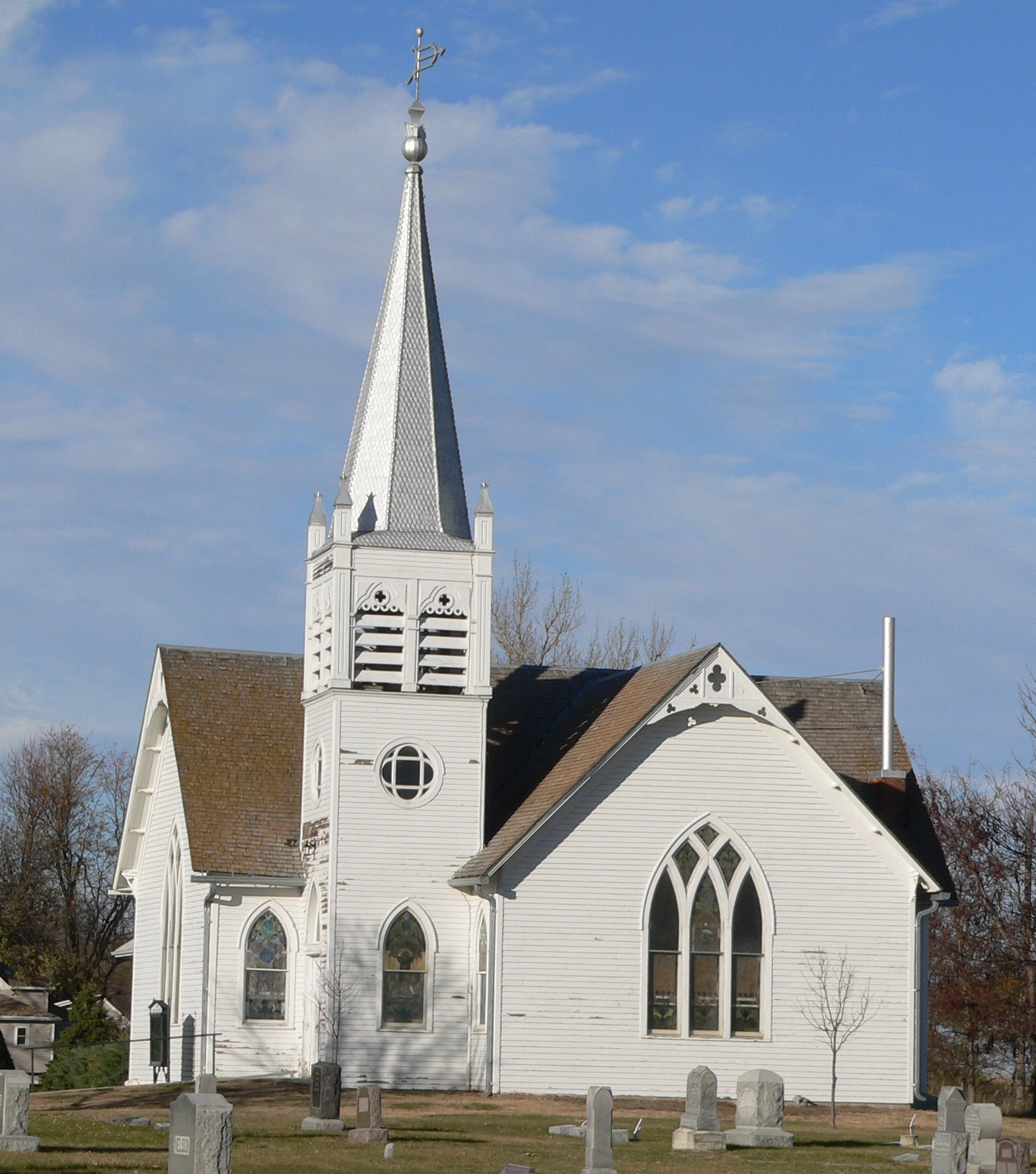

- Location within Nebraska Location within the United States
- Nearest city: Axtell, Nebraska
- Coordinates: 40°27′11″N 99°10′42″W
- Area: 3 acres (1.2 ha)
- Built: 1883, 1898, 1910
- Architectural style: Late Victorian, Late Carpenter Gothic
- NRHP reference No.: 82003192
- Added to NRHP: July 29, 1982

Salem Swedish Methodist Episcopal Church (also known as John Fletcher Christian College Chapel) is a Methodist church complex in Kearney County, Nebraska, southwest of Axtell, Nebraska.

== History ==
The church was founded in 1883 to cater to the growing number of Swedish immigrants to Nebraska. The first church was erected in 1884 before being rebuilt in 1898. The church was originally set up as a Lutheran Augustinian church but due to dissatisfaction from the congregation, whom felt it was too much like the Church of Sweden, redenominated it into a Methodist church. It has served Methodism since then, though it has been run by different Methodist denominations throughout its existence. In 1972, the United Methodist Church sold it to the Evangelical Wesleyan Church. The campus of the John Fletcher Christian College and Academy, which was founded in 1968, was moved to this location. John Fletcher Christian College trained ministers to serve in the Evangelical Wesleyan Church, a Methodist denomination aligned with the conservative holiness movement; it had an emphasis on the historic liturgy promulgated by John Wesley in The Sunday Service of the Methodists. The seminary functioned until 1995, the year the wife of its president, Larry Smith, died in an automobile accident.

== Design ==
The current church was built with Late Victorian/Late Carpenter Gothic style. There was a transition from the old church being in more of a traditional Swedish style whereas the new church was in more of a contemporary American gothic style. It was added to the National Register of Historic Places in 1982. The listing includes the church, a parsonage (1883), a cemetery, and a school, located on the campus of the John Fletcher Christian College and Academy.
