= Area codes 402 and 531 =

Telephone area codes for eastern Nebraska

Coordinates: 42.0°N 98.0°W

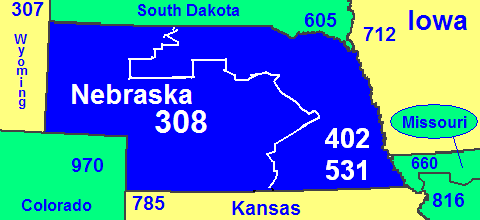
Nebraska's numbering plan areas and area codes (blue)

Area codes 402 and 531 are telephone area codes in the North American Numbering Plan (NANP) for the eastern part of the U.S. state of Nebraska. Area code 402 was one of the original North American area codes created in 1947, when it was assigned to the entire state. By splitting the numbering plan area (NPA) in 1954, it was reduced to roughly just the eastern half, including Lincoln, the state capital, and Omaha, the largest city in the state. In 2011, the North American Numbering Plan Administrator (NANPA) authorized an overlay complex for which area code 531 was added to the same service area.

== History ==
In 1947, the American Telephone and Telegraph Company (AT&T) created the first nationwide telephone numbering plan in the United States and Canada. The entire state of Nebraska was designated as one of eighty-six numbering plan areas, and received area code 402.

In 1954, the numbering plan area was divided. Eastern Nebraska retained 402, and area code 308 was assigned to western Nebraska. The overall roughly diagonal dividing line runs from the southeast between Hastings and Minden north into the northern part of the state and then west towards the eastern edge of the Sandhills in the northwest of the state.

Nebraska's most populous cities, Omaha and Lincoln, are near each other in the eastern part of the state and retained the area code, while Grand Island, then the state's third most populous city, was placed in 308.

Omaha and Lincoln are not only home to most of Nebraska's landlines, but also to most of its cell phones and pagers. As a result, the numbering pool for area code 402 was nearly exhausted by the end of the 1990s. It was originally projected to be exhausted in 2001, but number pooling was implemented to stave off exhaustion. In 2009, however, NeuStar projected that 402 would be exhausted in 2010.

In March 2011, central office code relief was implemented by adding area code 531 in an overlay to the same service area of 402. Although the first central office prefix in 531 was not assigned until February 2013, ten-digit dialing has been mandatory for all calls from the 402 territory since Spring 2011.

== See also ==
- List of Nebraska area codes
- List of North American Numbering Plan area codes

Nebraska area codes: 308, 402/531
	North: 605	
West: 308	402/531	East: 712, 660
	South: 785	
Iowa area codes: 319, 515, 563, 641, 712
Kansas area codes: 316, 620, 785, 913
Missouri area codes: 314/557, 417, 573/235, 636, 660, 816/975
South Dakota area codes: 605
