= Liberty Township, Kearney County, Nebraska =

Liberty Township
- Township
- Location in Kearney County
- Coordinates: 40°34′31″N 098°53′08″W
- Country: United States
- State: Nebraska
- County: Kearney

Area
  - Total: 35.91 sq mi (93.01 km^{2})
  - Land: 35.88 sq mi (92.92 km^{2})
  - Water: 0.035 sq mi (0.09 km^{2}) 0.1%
- Elevation: 2,119 ft (646 m)

Population (2020)
  - Total: 156
  - Density: 4.35/sq mi (1.68/km^{2})
- GNIS feature ID: 0838088

Liberty Township is one of fourteen townships in Kearney County, Nebraska, United States. The population was 156 at the 2020 census. A 2021 estimate placed the township's population at 155.

== See also ==
- County government in Nebraska
