= Cosmo Township, Kearney County, Nebraska =

Cosmo Township
- Township
- Location in Kearney County
- Coordinates: 40°23′38″N 98°53′40″W
- Country: United States
- State: Nebraska
- County: Kearney

Area
  - Total: 36.19 sq mi (93.73 km^{2})
  - Land: 36.18 sq mi (93.71 km^{2})
  - Water: 0.0077 sq mi (0.02 km^{2}) 0.02%
- Elevation: 2,156 ft (657 m)

Population (2020)
  - Total: 95
  - Density: 2.6/sq mi (1.0/km^{2})
- GNIS feature ID: 0837939

Cosmo Township is one of fourteen townships in Kearney County, Nebraska, United States. The population was 95 at the 2020 census. A 2021 estimate placed the township's population at 94.

== See also ==
- County government in Nebraska
