= Keene, Nebraska =

Unincorporated community in Nebraska, U.S.

Coordinates: 40°25′31″N 99°03′57″W

Keene is an unincorporated community in Kearney County, Nebraska, United States.

== History ==
A post office was established at Keene in the 1870s. Keene was the name of a workman who temporarily lived in the area.
