= List of Nebraska area codes =

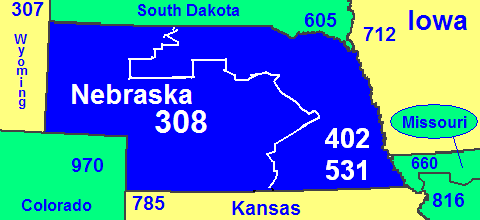

In 1947, the American Telephone and Telegraph Company designated the entire state of Nebraska as a single numbering plan area (NPA) with area code 402. The state was divided into two NPAs in 1954. In 2011, the eastern half received a second area code in creation of an overlay complex.

Area code	Year created	Parent NPA	Overlay	Numbering plan area
402	1947	–	402/531	Eastern Nebraska, including Lincoln and Omaha
531	2011	402	402/531	Eastern Nebraska, including Lincoln and Omaha
308	1954	402	–	Western Nebraska, including Grand Island and Kearney

== See also ==
- List of North American Numbering Plan area codes
