= Wilcox, Nebraska =

- Village
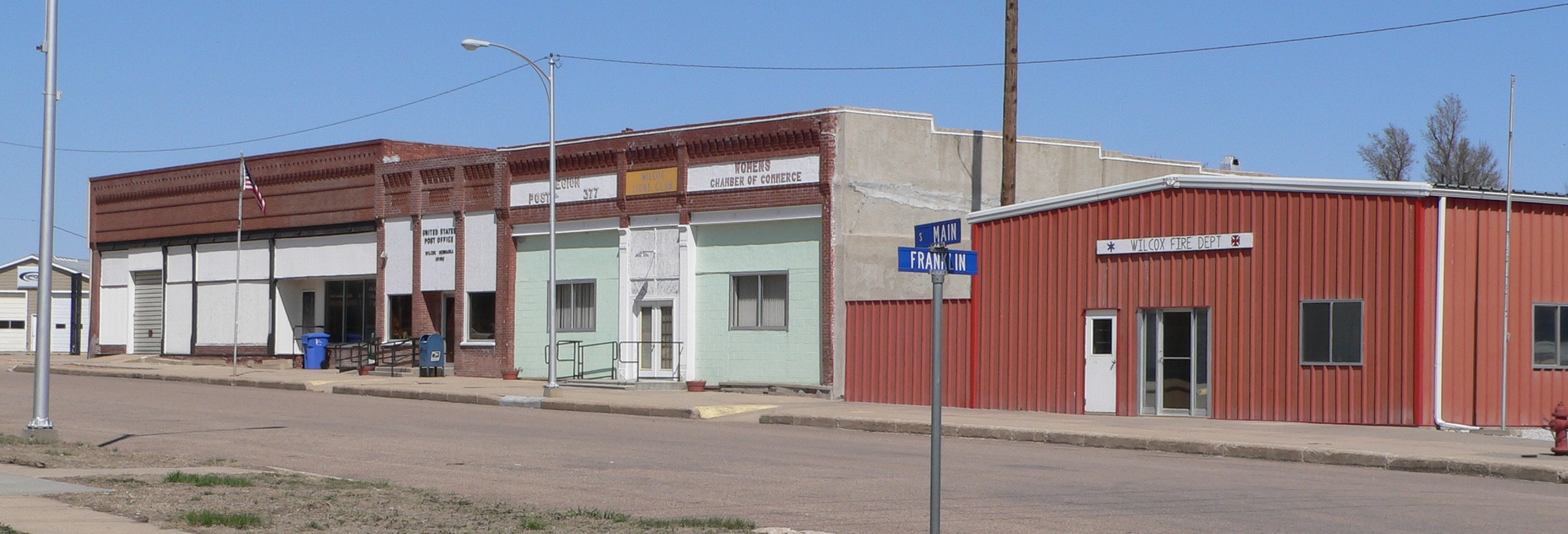
- Downtown Wilcox: East side of Main Street, looking northeast from Franklin Street

- Location of Wilcox, Nebraska
- Coordinates: 40°21′52″N 99°10′09″W
- Country: United States
- State: Nebraska
- County: Kearney

Area
  - Total: 0.50 sq mi (1.29 km^{2})
  - Land: 0.50 sq mi (1.29 km^{2})
  - Water: 0 sq mi (0.00 km^{2})
- Elevation: 2,234 ft (681 m)

Population (2020)
  - Total: 331
  - Estimate (2021): 328
  - Density: 665/sq mi (257/km^{2})
- Time zone: UTC-6 (Central (CST))
  - Summer (DST): UTC-5 (CDT)
- ZIP code: 68982
- Area code: 308
- FIPS code: 31-52995
- GNIS feature ID: 2400169
- Website: wilcoxne.com

Wilcox is a village in Kearney County, Nebraska, United States. It is part of the Kearney, Nebraska Micropolitan Statistical Area. The population was 331 at the 2020 census.

== History ==
Wilcox was established in the 1880s when the Burlington and Missouri River Railroad was extended to that point. It was named for its founder, Henry Wilcox.

== Geography ==
According to the United States Census Bureau, the village has a total area of 0.54 square miles (1.40 km^{2}), all land.

== Demographics ==
Historical population
Census	Pop.	Note	%±
1890	250		—
1900	266		6.4%
1910	382		43.6%
1920	358		−6.3%
1930	343		−4.2%
1940	310		−9.6%
1950	296		−4.5%
1960	260		−12.2%
1970	280		7.7%
1980	379		35.4%
1990	349		−7.9%
2000	360		3.2%
2010	358		−0.6%
2020	330		−7.8%
2021 (est.)	328	▼	−0.6%
U.S. Decennial Census

=== 2010 census ===
At the 2010 census there were 358 people, 143 households, and 101 families in the village. The population density was 663.0 inhabitants per square mile (256.0/km^{2}). There were 148 housing units at an average density of 274.1 per square mile (105.8/km^{2}). The racial makeup of the village was 97.8% White, 0.3% African American, 0.3% Native American, 0.8% from other races, and 0.8% from two or more races. Hispanic or Latino of any race were 1.4%.

Of the 143 households 30.8% had children under the age of 18 living with them, 60.1% were married couples living together, 7.7% had a female householder with no husband present, 2.8% had a male householder with no wife present, and 29.4% were non-families. 25.2% of households were one person and 14% were one person aged 65 or older. The average household size was 2.50 and the average family size was 3.00.

The median age in the village was 45.8 years. 26.3% of residents were under the age of 18; 4.4% were between the ages of 18 and 24; 18.2% were from 25 to 44; 34.4% were from 45 to 64; and 16.8% were 65 or older. The gender makeup of the village was 50.0% male and 50.0% female.

=== 2000 census ===
At the 2000 census there were 360 people, 147 households, and 109 families in the village. The population density was 661.7 inhabitants per square mile (255.5/km^{2}). There were 157 housing units at an average density of 288.6 per square mile (111.4/km^{2}). The racial makeup of the village was 98.89% White, 0.28% Native American, and 0.83% from two or more races. Hispanic or Latino of any race were 0.28%.

Of the 147 households 36.1% had children under the age of 18 living with them, 61.9% were married couples living together, 10.9% had a female householder with no husband present, and 25.2% were non-families. 24.5% of households were one person and 15.0% were one person aged 65 or older. The average household size was 2.45 and the average family size was 2.87.

The age distribution was 28.9% under the age of 18, 3.6% from 18 to 24, 27.5% from 25 to 44, 19.2% from 45 to 64, and 20.8% 65 or older. The median age was 40 years. For every 100 females, there were 93.5 males. For every 100 females age 18 and over, there were 89.6 males.

The median household income was $28,958, and the median family income was $32,500. Males had a median income of $27,031 versus $18,194 for females. The per capita income for the village was $14,626. About 3.6% of families and 5.0% of the population were below the poverty line, including 6.9% of those under age 18 and 2.5% of those age 65 or over.
