= W. T. Thorne Building =

- U.S. National Register of Historic Places
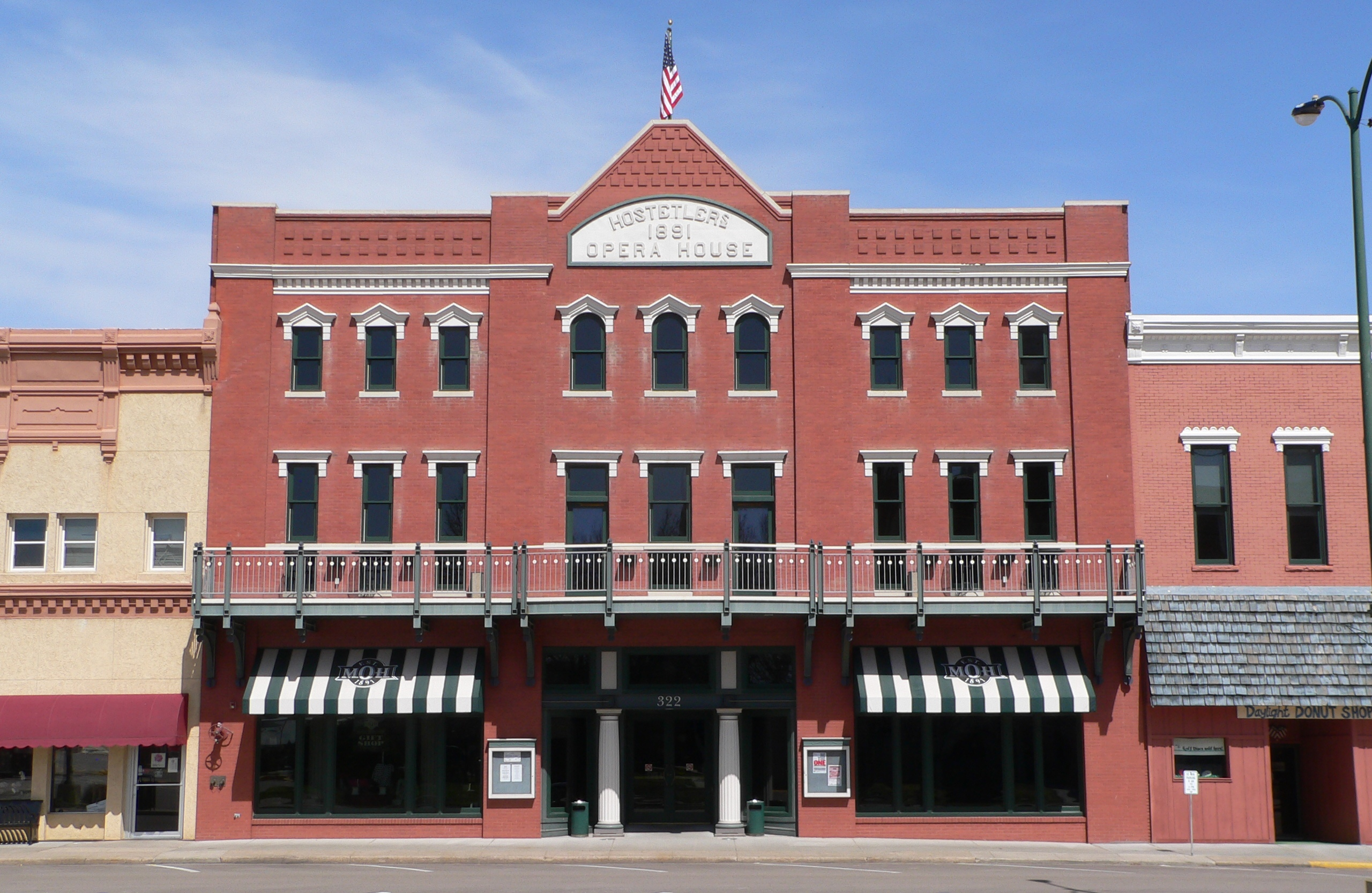
- The building in 2010

- Location within Nebraska Location within the United States
- Location: 5th Street, Minden, Nebraska
- Coordinates: 40°29′59″N 98°56′54″W
- Area: less than one acre
- Built: 1891
- Built by: W. T. Thorne
- Architectural style: Renaissance Revival
- NRHP reference No.: 85002139
- Added to NRHP: September 12, 1985

The W. T. Thorne Building, also known as Hostetler's Opera House, is a historic three-story building in Minden, Nebraska. It was built in 1891 by W. T. Thorne, and designed in the Renaissance Revival architectural style. It was named for Bruno 0. Hostetler, who served as the mayor of Kearney, Nebraska and a judge. It has been listed on the National Register of Historic Places since September 12, 1985.
