= Pioneer Village (Nebraska) =

- Pioneer Village's Highway Sign (1980)

- Location within Nebraska
- Established: 1953
- Location: 138 E US Highway 6, Minden, Nebraska 68959, United States
- Coordinates: 40°30′17″N 98°57′02″W
- Type: Pioneer Museum
- Website: pioneervillage.com

Pioneer Village is a museum and tourist attraction along U.S. Highway 6 in Minden, Nebraska, United States, featured in many roadside and historical attraction guides. It is made up of a collection of 50,000 historical objects and 28 historical buildings. Its location in Minden has been a boon to the city since its opening in 1953, through to the present day.

== History ==
=== Inception ===
The Pioneer Village was founded in 1953 by Harold Warp, a Chicago manufacturer of Flex-O-Glass, a plastic film. He returned to his home town of Minden to find that the city had put the one-room school house he attended as a child up for auction. He purchased the building in 1953, and placed it on the future museum grounds. This began the collection of historical buildings, technology, and art that would come to represent his recollection of the history of man's progress.

=== The Warp Family ===
Pioneer Village has been continuously family operated. In 1983, Harold Warp donated the museum to the nonprofit Harold Warp Pioneer Village Foundation.

After Harold Warp's death in 1994, his son Skip Warp took over, but because he managed his father's Flex-O-Glass business and lived in Chicago, he often wasn't involved with the museum's upkeep.

In 2011 the tax exemption on the motel and campground attached to the museum was brought into question by the Nebraska state tax commissioner. When the commissioner's position was upheld, the Pioneer Village Foundation appealed to the Nebraska Supreme Court. The decision was reversed.

After Skip died in 2020, Harold's grandchildren took over. The museum has deaccessioned duplicate and unused objects in storage to help raise finances for the restoration of various museum buildings.

== Collections ==
The museum comprises a complex of 28 buildings on 20 acres (81,000 m^{2}) with a total collection of over 50,000 items. The museum's collection spans Americana from 1830 to the present. The objects comprise a distinctly eclectic sensibility. Warp, who is responsible for the vast majority of the collection, purchased anything, across North America, that represented the daily use of American technology. This includes, but is not limited to, early cars (more than 350 are on display) and airplanes; a Wurlitzer Caliola; tractors and other farm implements; appliances (televisions, refrigerators, washing machines, mechanical banks, pencils, etc.); and an art collection that features William Henry Jackson paintings and a set of John Rogers plaster sculptures. Objects are in chronological order of development within a type. The buildings that house the collections are mostly from Nebraska, and they are set up to loosely resemble a village, organized around a central green. They are similarly heterogeneous, including a supposed Pony Express station, school house, church, sod house, and 24 others, including a steam powered carousel.

== Gallery ==
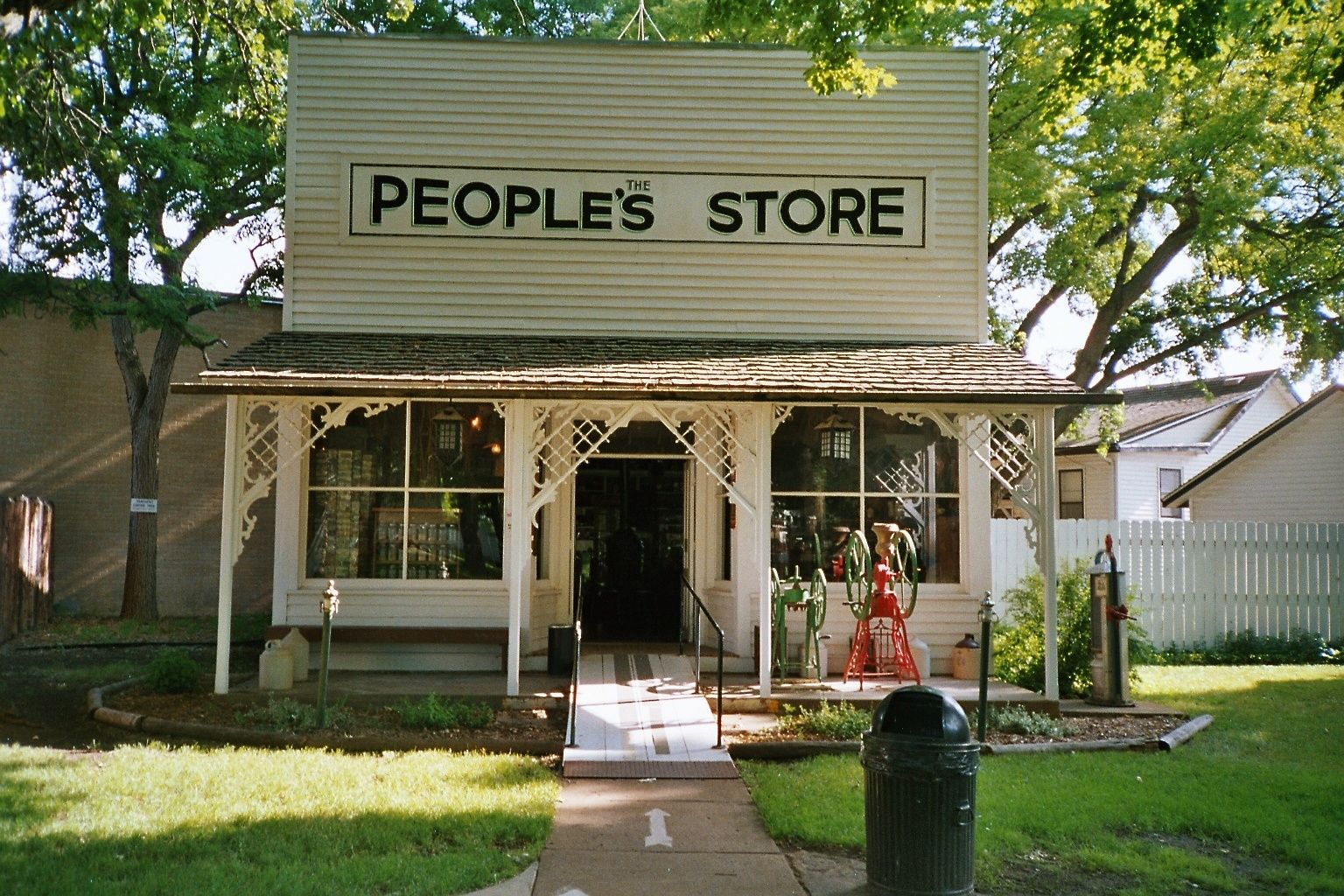
Pioneer Village's General Store

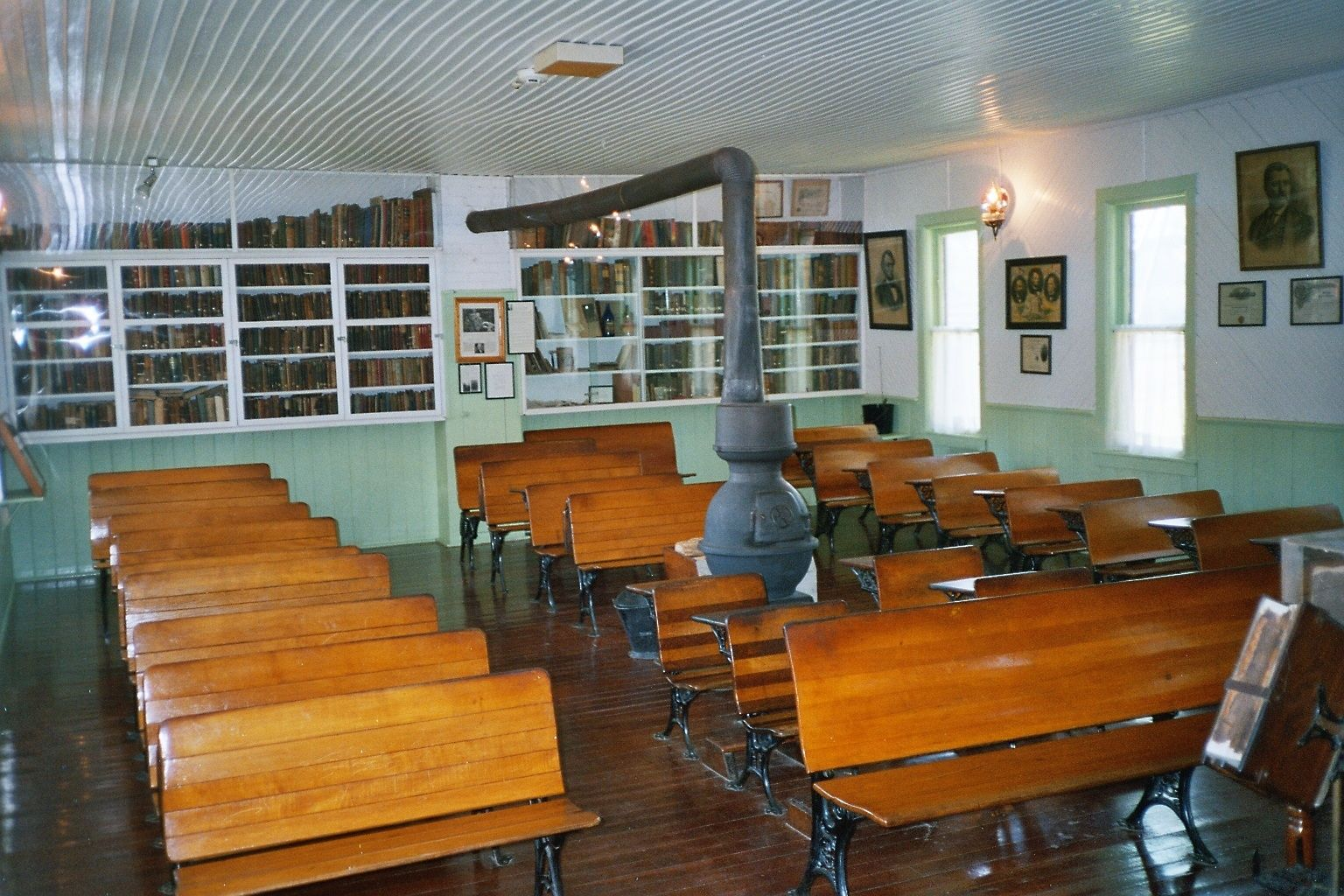
The one-room school house Harold Warp attended as a child and later purchased

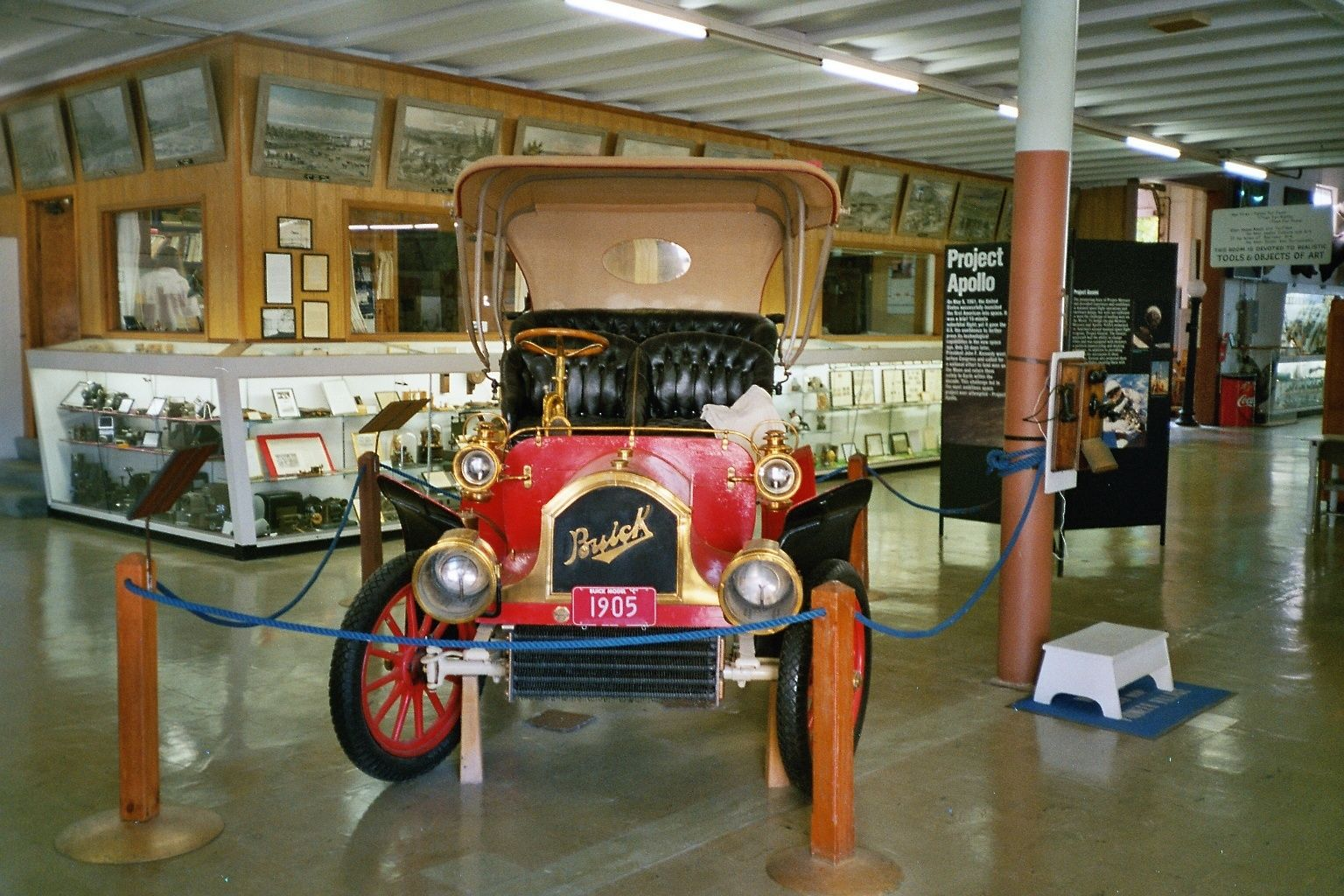
One of many antique cars on display

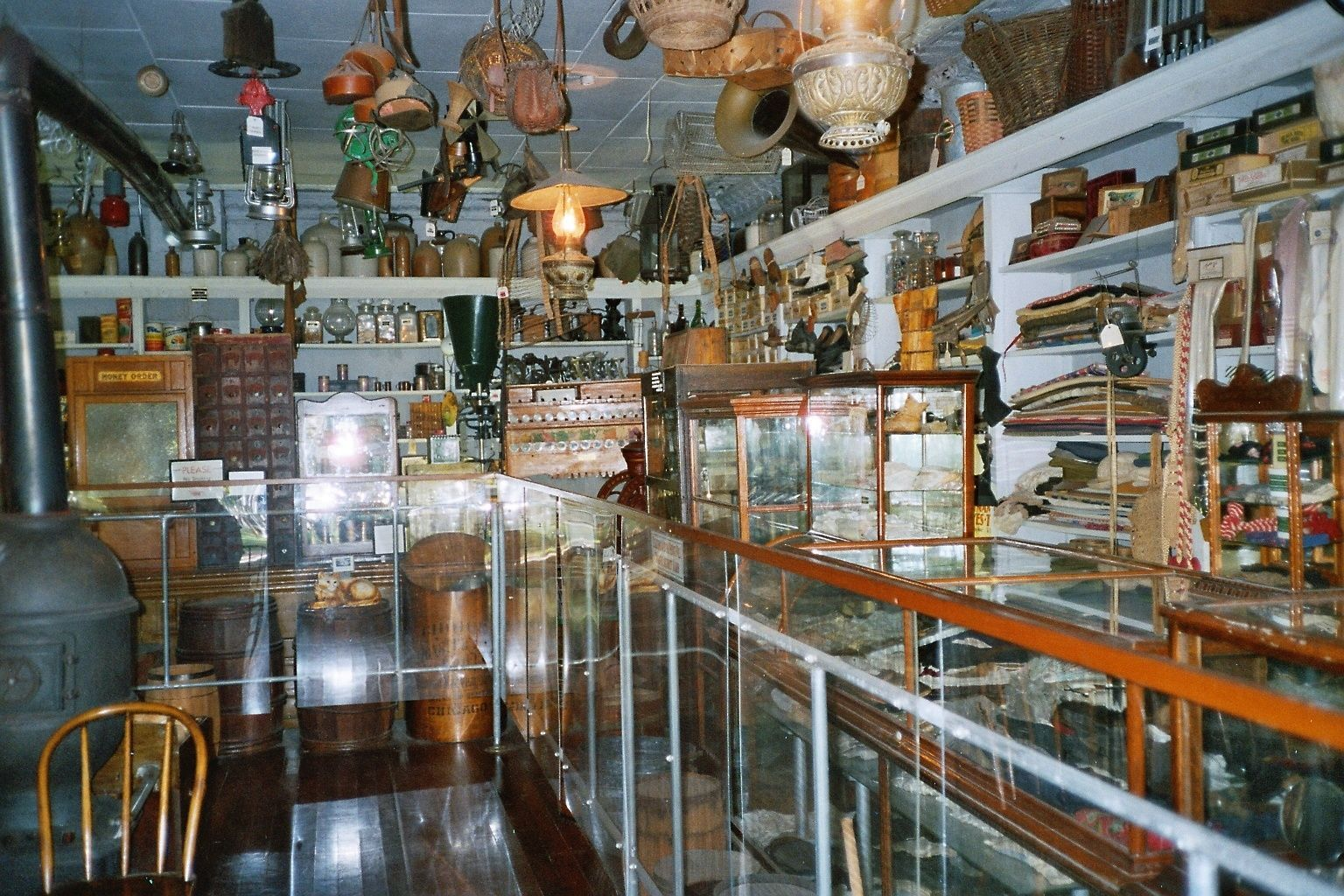

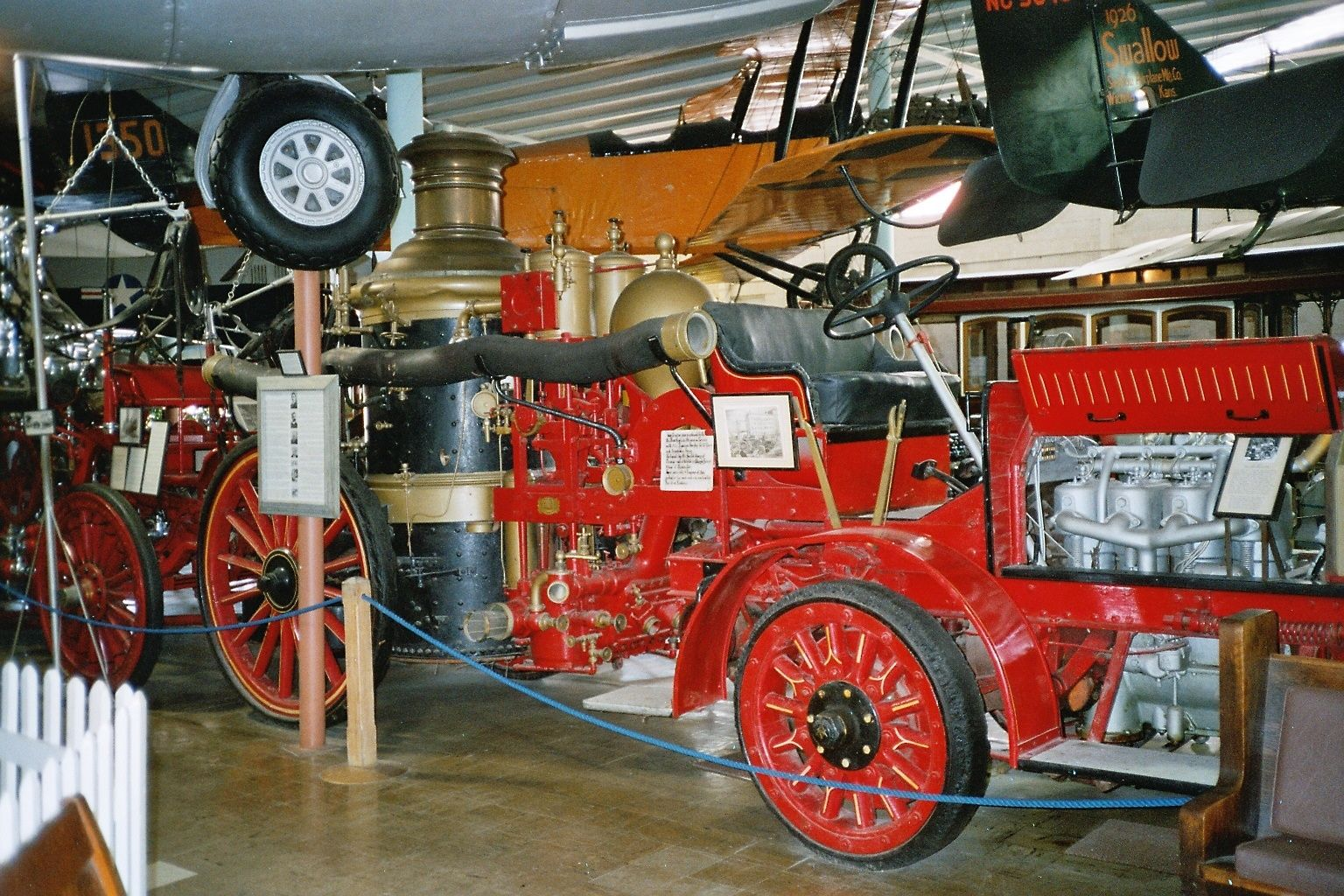
An early fire engine from The Pioneer Village automobile collection

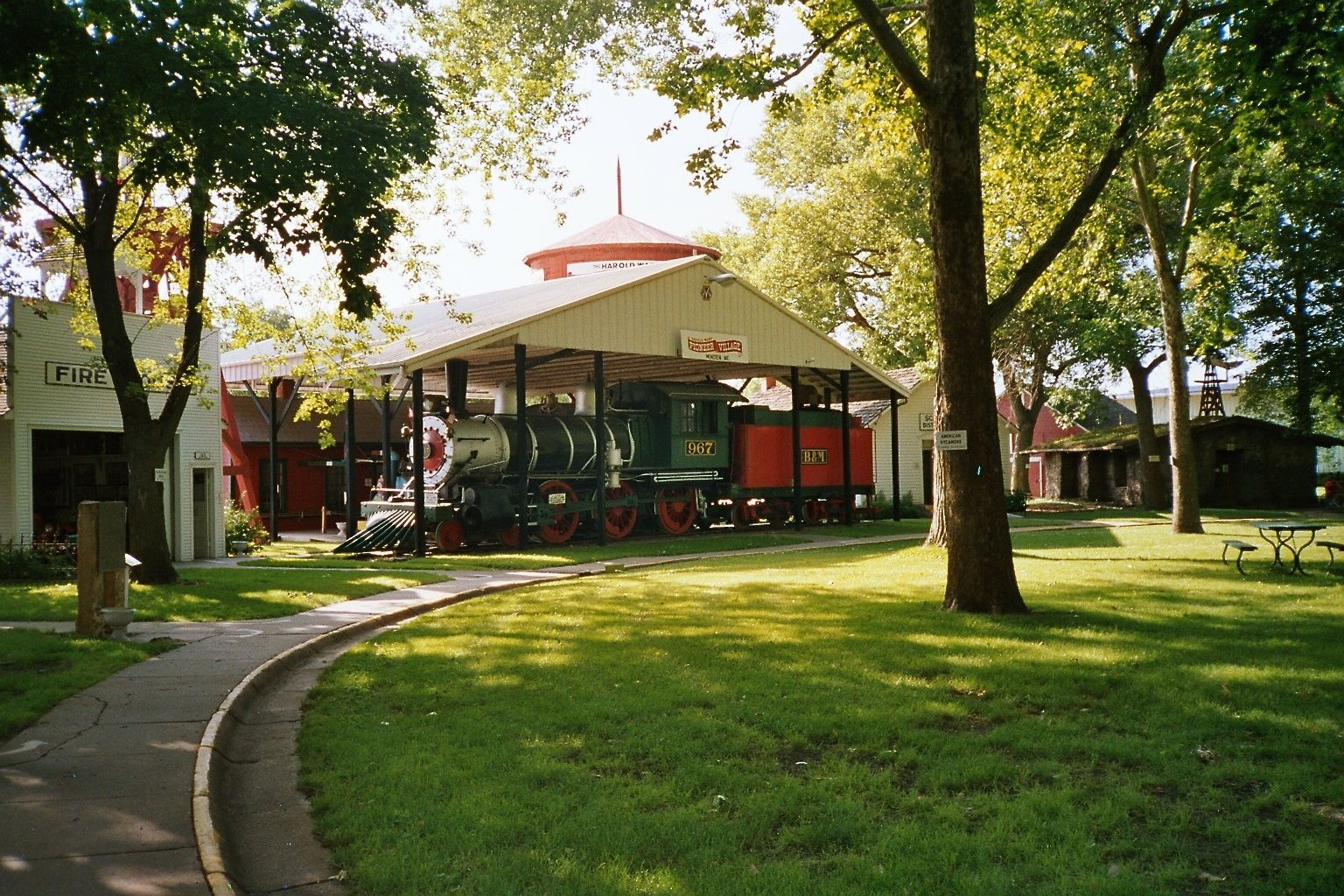

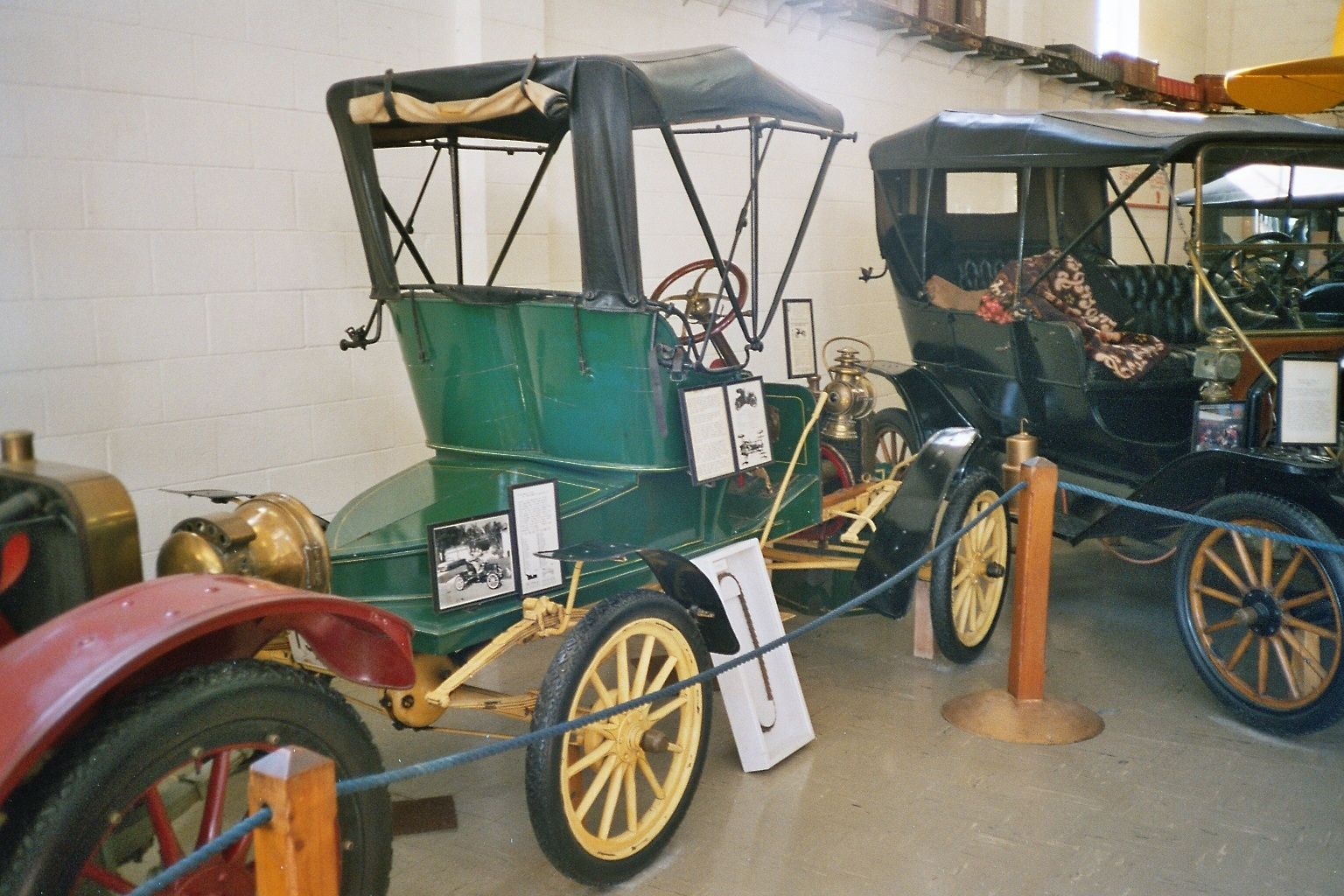

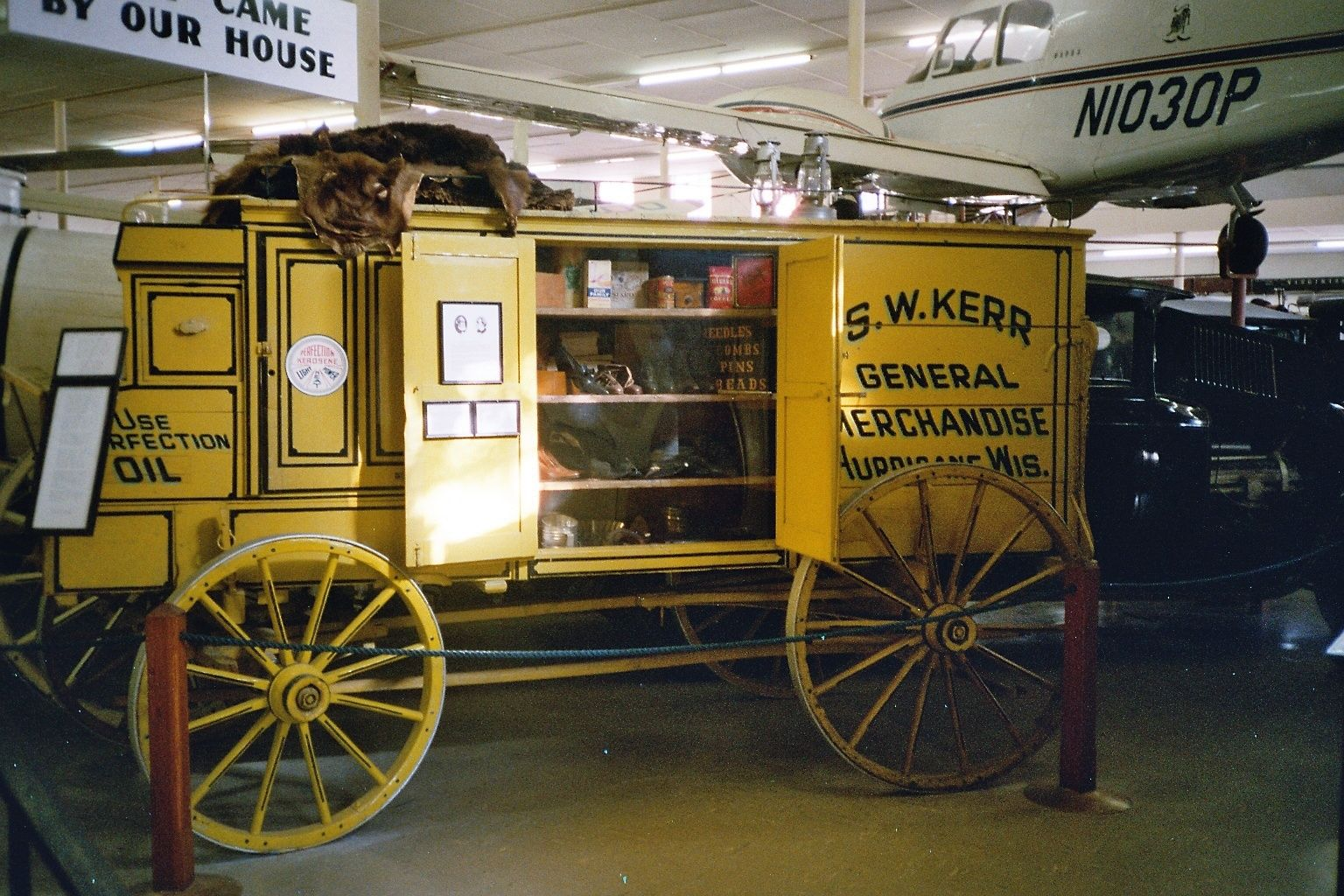

== See also ==
- List of museums in Nebraska
- Nebraska Prairie Museum, located about 20 miles west in Holdrege, Nebraska.
- Hastings Museum, located about 30 miles east in Hastings, Nebraska.
