= Newark, Nebraska =

Unincorporated community in Nebraska, United States

- Unincorporated community
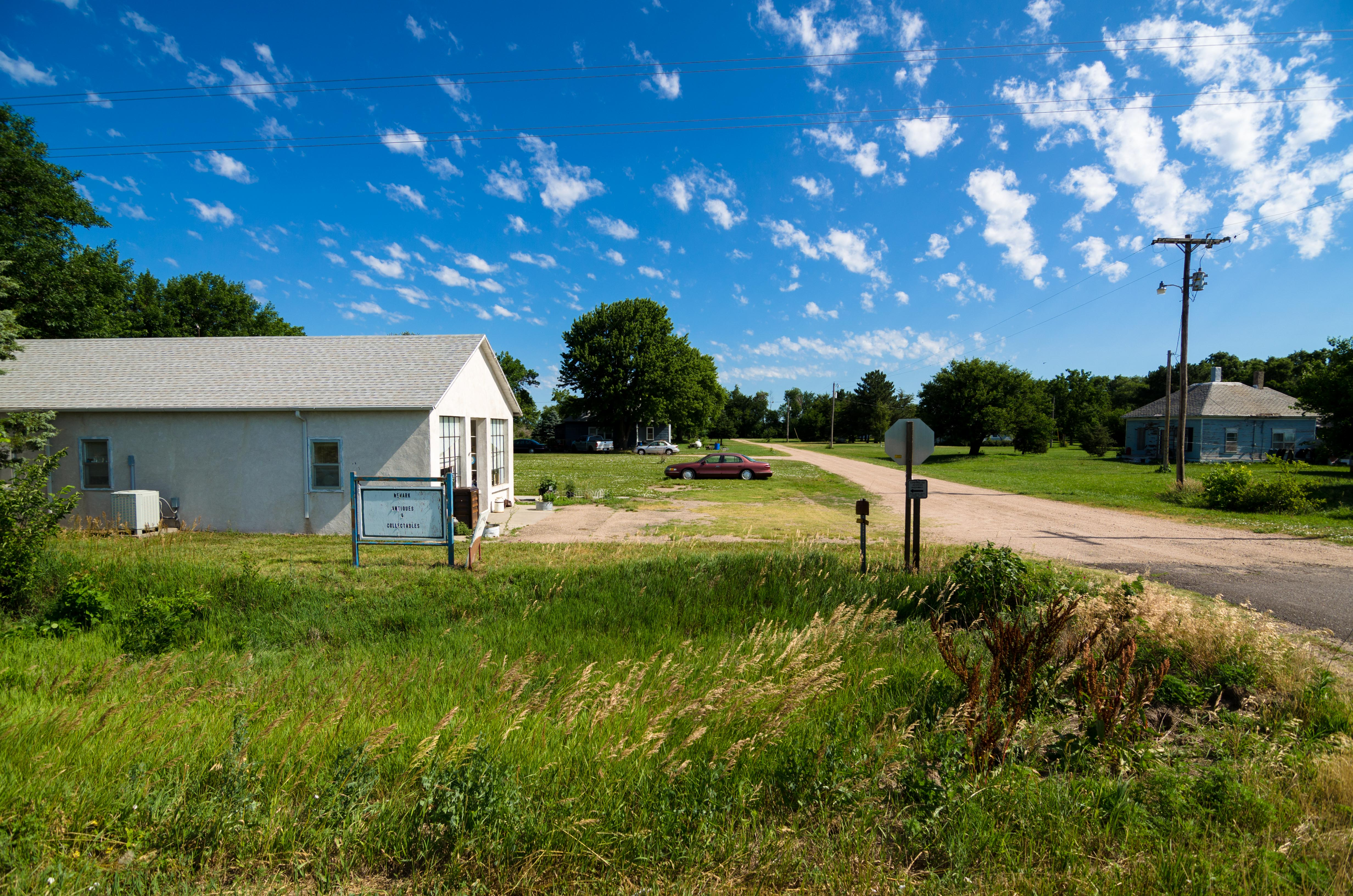

- Location within Nebraska
- Coordinates: 40°38′28″N 98°57′47″W
- Country: United States
- State: Nebraska
- County: Kearney
- Elevation: 2,103 ft (641 m)
- Time zone: UTC-6 (Central (CST))
  - Summer (DST): UTC-5 (CDT)
- ZIP code: 68959
- Area code: 308
- GNIS feature ID: 831613

Newark is an unincorporated community in Kearney County, Nebraska, United States.

== History ==
A post office was established at Newark in the 1870s. It was likely named by a settler who was a native of Newark, New Jersey.
