= Norman, Nebraska =

- Village
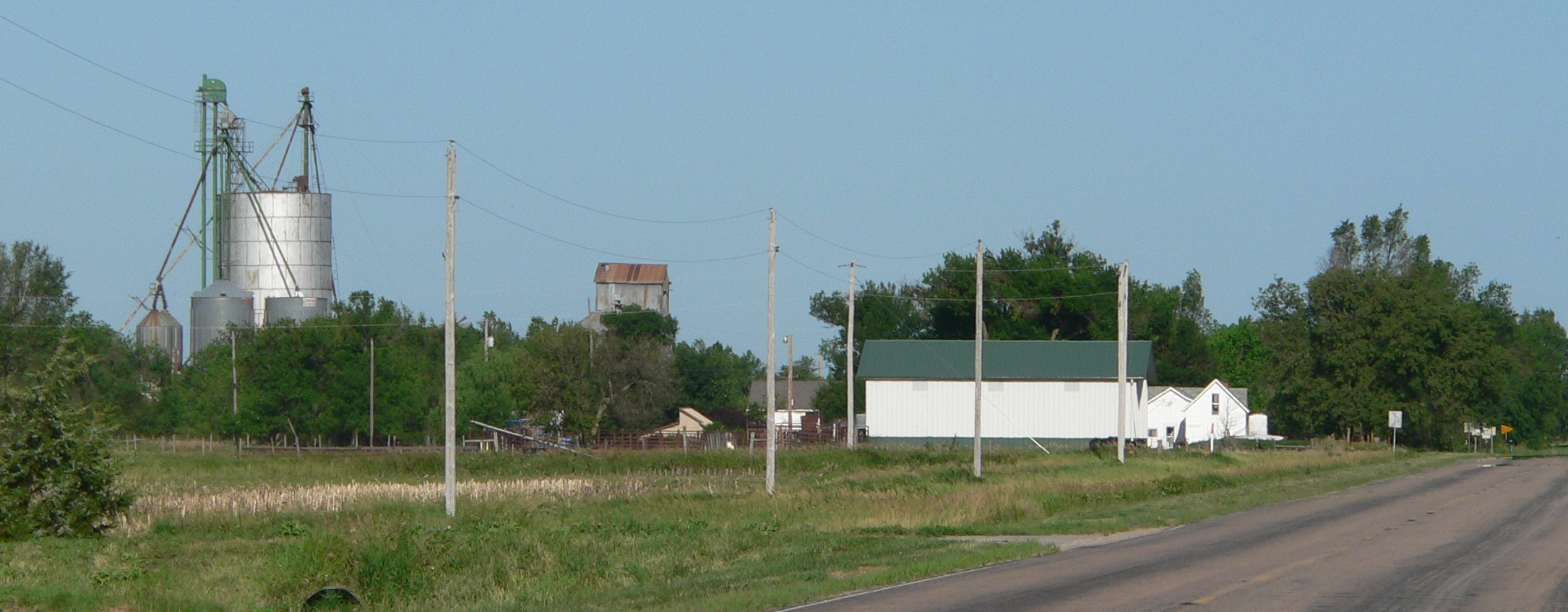
- Norman, seen from the east on Nebraska Highway 74.

- Location of Norman, Nebraska
- Coordinates: 40°28′45″N 98°47′32″W
- Country: United States
- State: Nebraska
- County: Kearney

Area
  - Total: 0.093 sq mi (0.24 km^{2})
  - Land: 0.093 sq mi (0.24 km^{2})
  - Water: 0 sq mi (0.00 km^{2})
- Elevation: 2,080 ft (630 m)

Population (2020)
  - Total: 36
  - Estimate (2021): 36
  - Density: 390/sq mi (150/km^{2})
- Time zone: UTC-6 (Central (CST))
  - Summer (DST): UTC-5 (CDT)
- ZIP code: 68959
- Area code: 308
- FIPS code: 31-34650
- GNIS feature ID: 2399503

Norman is a village in Kearney County, Nebraska, United States. It is part of the Kearney, Nebraska Micropolitan Statistical Area. The population was 36 at the 2020 census.

== History ==
Norman was platted in 1887. It was named for John and Carl Norman, the original owners of the town site.

== Geography ==
According to the United States Census Bureau, the village has a total area of 0.09 square miles (0.23 km^{2}), all land.

== Demographics ==
Historical population
Census	Pop.	Note	%±
1920	127		—
1930	107		−15.7%
1940	98		−8.4%
1950	68		−30.6%
1960	57		−16.2%
1970	52		−8.8%
1980	58		11.5%
1990	48		−17.2%
2000	49		2.1%
2010	43		−12.2%
2020	32		−25.6%
2021 (est.)	36	▲	12.5%
U.S. Decennial Census

=== 2010 census ===
At the 2010 census there were 43 people, 22 households, and 11 families living in the village. The population density was 477.8 inhabitants per square mile (184.5/km^{2}). There were 22 housing units at an average density of 244.4 per square mile (94.4/km^{2}). The racial makeup of the village was 100.0% White. Of the 22 households 36.4% had children under the age of 18 living with them, 36.4% were married couples living together, 9.1% had a female householder with no husband present, 4.5% had a male householder with no wife present, and 50.0% were non-families. 50.0% of households were one person and 18.1% were one person aged 65 or older. The average household size was 1.95 and the average family size was 2.82.

The median age in the village was 48.3 years. 20.9% of residents were under the age of 18; 4.7% were between the ages of 18 and 24; 18.6% were from 25 to 44; 34.9% were from 45 to 64; and 20.9% were 65 or older. The gender makeup of the village was 44.2% male and 55.8% female.

=== 2000 census ===
At the 2000 census there were 49 people, 23 households, and 12 families living in the village. The population density was 495.7 inhabitants per square mile (191.4/km^{2}). There were 25 housing units at an average density of 252.9 per square mile (97.6/km^{2}). The racial makeup of the village was 97.96% White, 2.04% from other races. Hispanic or Latino of any race were 8.16%.

Of the 23 households 30.4% had children under the age of 18 living with them, 47.8% were married couples living together, 4.3% had a female householder with no husband present, and 43.5% were non-families. 43.5% of households were one person and 21.7% were one person aged 65 or older. The average household size was 2.13 and the average family size was 2.92.

The age distribution was 20.4% under the age of 18, 8.2% from 18 to 24, 32.7% from 25 to 44, 20.4% from 45 to 64, and 18.4% 65 or older. The median age was 39 years. For every 100 females, there were 122.7 males. For every 100 females age 18 and over, there were 116.7 males.

The median household income was $32,917, and the median family income was $40,000. Males had a median income of $24,375 versus $17,500 for females. The per capita income for the village was $13,854. There were 18.8% of families and 19.7% of the population living below the poverty line, including 25.0% of under eighteens and 45.5% of those over 64.
