= Harold Warp =

American businessman and inventor

- Born: December 21, 1903; Minden, Nebraska, US
- Died: April 8, 1994 (aged 90); Fort Lauderdale, Florida, US
- Burial place: Schiller Park, Illinois, US
- Known for: Flex-O-Glass

Harold Warp (December 21, 1903 – April 8, 1994) was an American businessman who invented Flex-O-Glass. He also founded Pioneer Village in Minden, Nebraska.

Harold Warp was born in a sod house on a farm near Minden, Nebraska. He was the youngest of twelve children born to an immigrant family from Norway. When he was three years old, his father died; his mother died when he was eleven. In 1924, he and two of his brothers moved to Chicago with a patent for a plastic window material he had developed. Their business became successful and in time its product line grew to include many other plastic products. Warp Bros. is still in business and remains under family ownership. Harold Warp was the recipient of numerous awards including the Horatio Alger Award in 1979 and the Distinguished Nebraskalander Award in 1984.

Warp attended Game 3 of the 1932 World Series, possibly the only baseball game he attended in his life. He filmed a portion of the game on 16-mm film, including Babe Ruth's called shot. The film was revealed to the public by Warp's family in 1999, showing Ruth gesturing and appearing to point prior to hitting his famed home run.

He opened Pioneer Village in 1953 in Minden, Nebraska. Most of the objects on display were personally collected by him in his lifetime. In 1983, Warp donated the museum to the nonprofit Harold Warp Pioneer Village Foundation.
