= Sherman Township, Kearney County, Nebraska =

Sherman Township
- Township
- Location in Kearney County
- Coordinates: 40°23′40″N 099°00′30″W
- Country: United States
- State: Nebraska
- County: Kearney

Area
  - Total: 36.04 sq mi (93.34 km^{2})
  - Land: 36.00 sq mi (93.25 km^{2})
  - Water: 0.035 sq mi (0.09 km^{2}) 0.1%
- Elevation: 2,172 ft (662 m)

Population (2020)
  - Total: 69
  - Density: 1.9/sq mi (0.74/km^{2})
- GNIS feature ID: 0838249

Sherman Township is one of fourteen townships in Kearney County, Nebraska, United States. The population was 69 at the 2020 census. A 2021 estimate placed the township's population at 69.

== See also ==
- County government in Nebraska
