= Lowell Township, Kearney County, Nebraska =

Lowell Township
- Township
- Location in Kearney County
- Coordinates: 40°38′27″N 098°48′36″W
- Country: United States
- State: Nebraska
- County: Kearney

Area
  - Total: 42.14 sq mi (109.13 km^{2})
  - Land: 42.14 sq mi (109.13 km^{2})
  - Water: 0 sq mi (0 km^{2}) 0%
- Elevation: 2,057 ft (627 m)

Population (2020)
  - Total: 159
  - Density: 3.77/sq mi (1.46/km^{2})
- GNIS feature ID: 0838118

Lowell Township is one of fourteen townships in Kearney County, Nebraska, United States. The population was 159 at the 2020 census. A 2021 estimate placed the township's population at 159.

Lowell Township was named for James Russell Lowell, an American poet.

== See also ==
- County government in Nebraska
