= Bethphage Mission =

- U.S. National Register of Historic Places
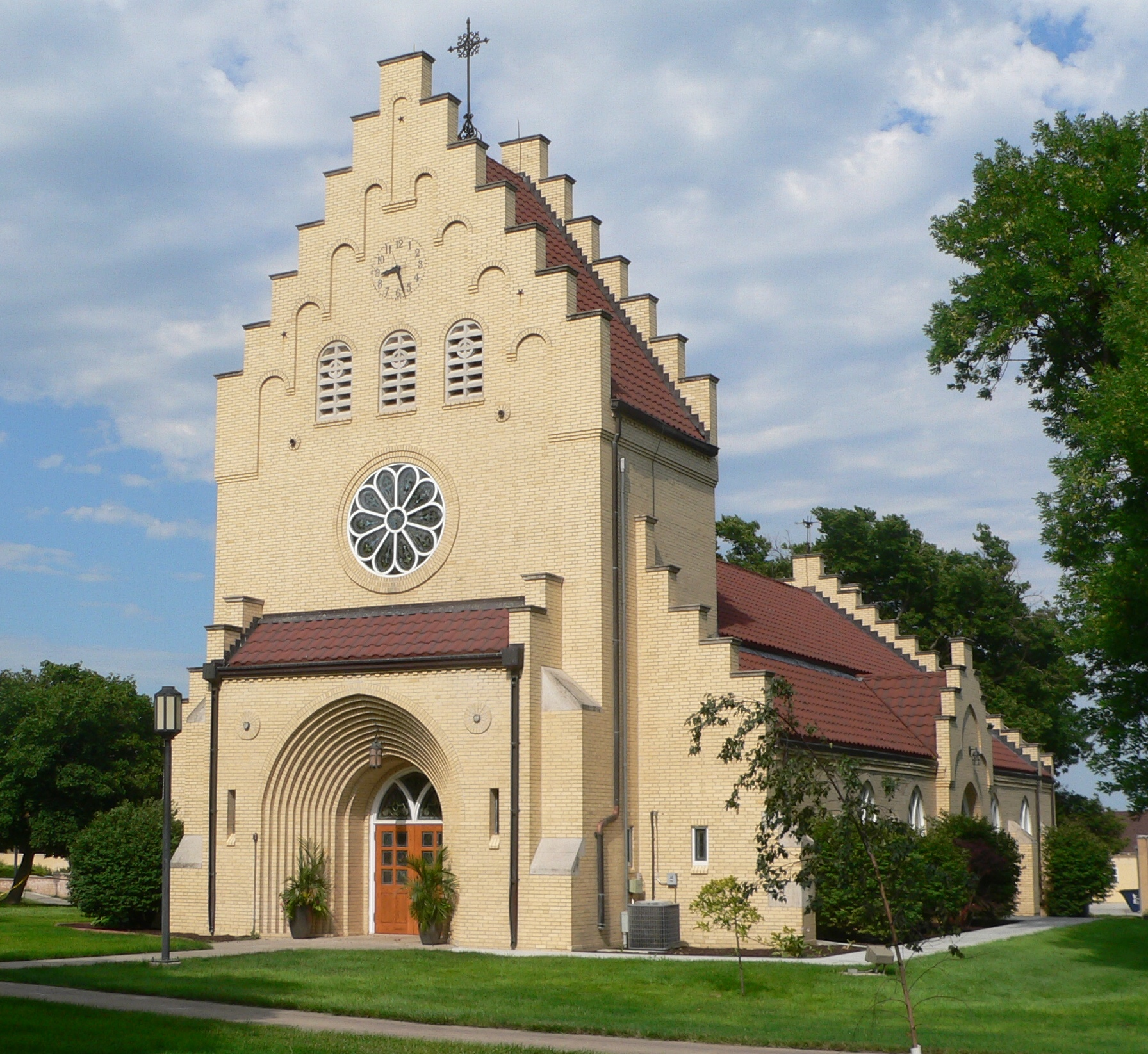
- The chapel in 2013

- Location within Nebraska Location within the United States
- Nearest city: Axtell, Nebraska
- Coordinates: 40°29′13″N 99°07′16″W
- Area: 40 acres (16 ha)
- Built: 1913
- Architect: Olof Z. Cervin
- Architectural style: Swedish National Romanticism
- NRHP reference No.: 13000199
- Added to NRHP: April 24, 2013

The Bethphage Mission is a historic structure in Axtell, Nebraska. It was established in 1913 for the Augustana Evangelical Lutheran Church, and it comprises several buildings. Tabor Hall was completed in 1916, followed by Kidron Hall in 1928, Zion Chapel in 1931, and Bethesda Hall in 1951. They were designed in the Swedish National Romantic architectural style, which includes the use of stepped gables. The structure has been listed on the National Register of Historic Places since April 24, 2013.
