= Heartwell, Nebraska =

- Village
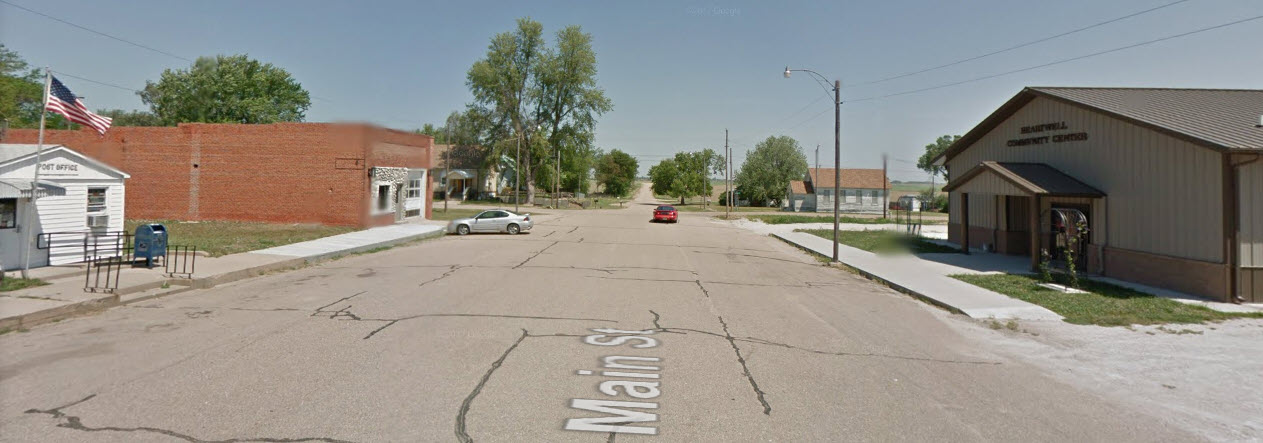
- Heartwell, Main Street

- Location of Heartwell, Nebraska
- Coordinates: 40°34′12″N 98°47′21″W
- Country: United States
- State: Nebraska
- County: Kearney

Area
  - Total: 0.073 sq mi (0.19 km^{2})
  - Land: 0.073 sq mi (0.19 km^{2})
  - Water: 0 sq mi (0.00 km^{2})
- Elevation: 2,100 ft (640 m)

Population (2020)
  - Total: 80
  - Estimate (2021): 79
  - Density: 1,100/sq mi (420/km^{2})
- Time zone: UTC-6 (Central (CST))
  - Summer (DST): UTC-5 (CDT)
- ZIP code: 68945
- Area code: 308
- FIPS code: 31-21835
- GNIS feature ID: 2398480

Heartwell is a village in Kearney County, Nebraska, United States. It is part of the Kearney, Nebraska Micropolitan Statistical Area. The population was 80 at the 2020 census.

== History ==
Heartwell was established circa 1883 when the Chicago, Burlington and Quincy Railroad was extended to that point. It was named for James B. Heartwell, a politician and bank official.

== Geography ==
According to the United States Census Bureau, the village has a total area of 0.07 square miles (0.18 km^{2}), all land.

== Demographics ==
Historical population
Census	Pop.	Note	%±
1920	140		—
1930	182		30.0%
1940	141		−22.5%
1950	125		−11.3%
1960	113		−9.6%
1970	104		−8.0%
1980	87		−16.3%
1990	69		−20.7%
2000	80		15.9%
2010	71		−11.2%
2020	81		14.1%
2021 (est.)	79	▼	−2.5%
U.S. Decennial Census

=== 2010 census ===
As of the census of 2010, there were 71 people, 28 households, and 21 families living in the village. The population density was 1,014.3 inhabitants per square mile (391.6/km^{2}). There were 33 housing units at an average density of 471.4 per square mile (182.0/km^{2}). The racial makeup of the village was 88.7% White, 8.5% from other races, and 2.8% from two or more races. Hispanic or Latino of any race were 18.3% of the population.

There were 28 households, of which 35.7% had children under the age of 18 living with them, 57.1% were married couples living together, 14.3% had a female householder with no husband present, 3.6% had a male householder with no wife present, and 25.0% were non-families. 21.4% of all households were made up of individuals. The average household size was 2.54 and the average family size was 2.86.

The median age in the village was 37.8 years. 25.4% of residents were under the age of 18; 16.9% were between the ages of 18 and 24; 18.3% were from 25 to 44; 25.3% were from 45 to 64; and 14.1% were 65 years of age or older. The gender makeup of the village was 56.3% male and 43.7% female.

=== 2000 census ===
As of the census of 2000, there were 80 people, 31 households, and 23 families living in the village. The population density was 1,056.8 inhabitants per square mile (408.0/km^{2}). There were 37 housing units at an average density of 488.8 per square mile (188.7/km^{2}). The racial makeup of the village was 85.00% White, 11.25% from other races, and 3.75% from two or more races. Hispanic or Latino of any race were 17.50% of the population.

There were 31 households, out of which 38.7% had children under the age of 18 living with them, 64.5% were married couples living together, 6.5% had a female householder with no husband present, and 22.6% were non-families. 22.6% of all households were made up of individuals, and 12.9% had someone living alone who was 65 years of age or older. The average household size was 2.58 and the average family size was 3.00.

The median age was 30 years. The age distribution was: 28.8% under the age of 18, 10.0% aged from 18 to 24, 32.5% from 25 to 44, 20.0% from 45 to 64, and 8.8% aged 65 years or older. For every 100 females, there were 105.1 males. For every 100 females age 18 and over, there were 96.6 males.

As of 2000 the median income for a household in the village was $35,417, and the median income for a family was $41,250. Males had a median income of $27,250 versus $17,708 for females. The per capita income for the village was $16,387. None of the population and none of the families were below the poverty line.
