= Lowell, Nebraska =

Unincorporated community in Nebraska, United States

- Unincorporated community
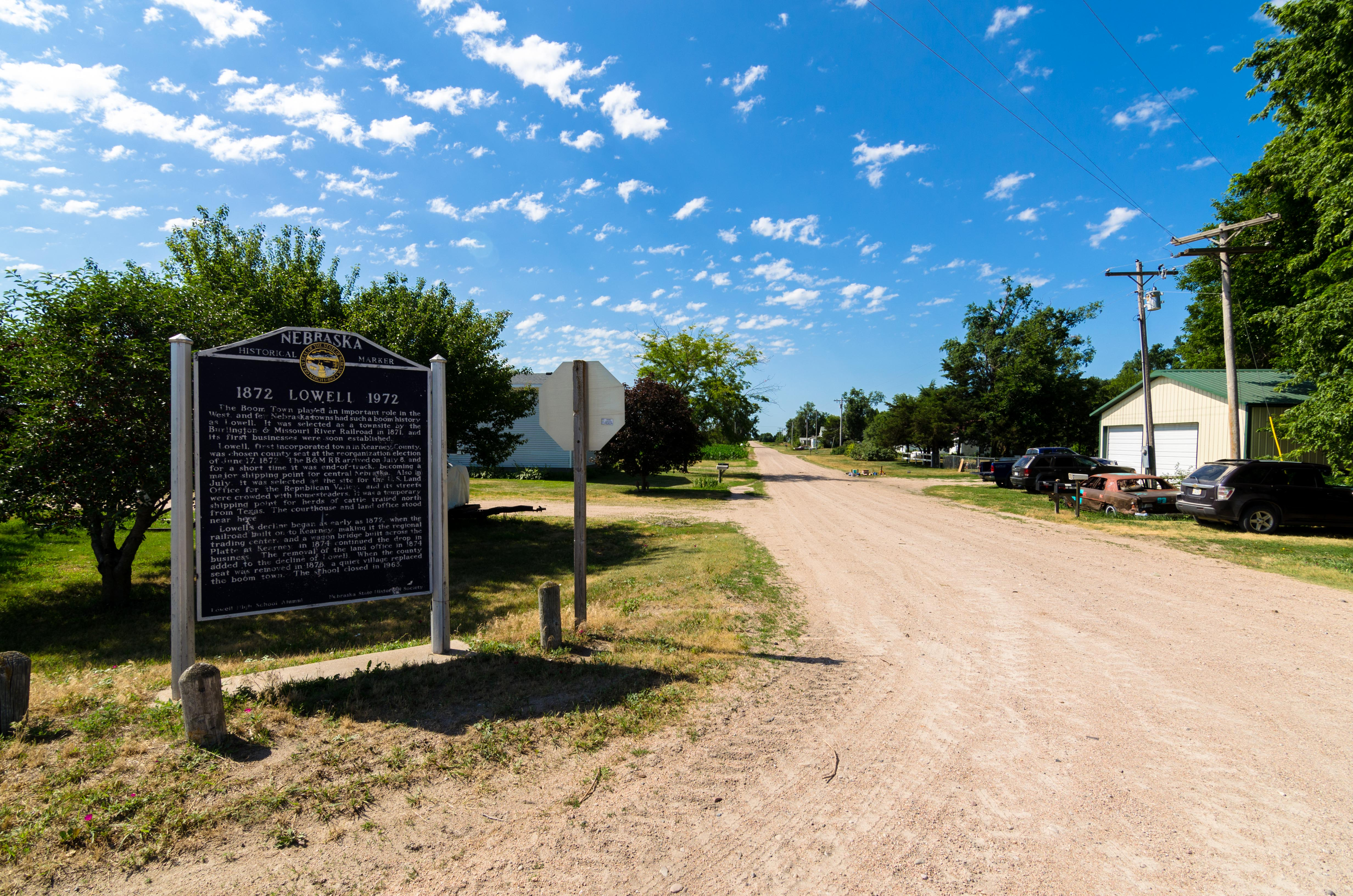

- Location within Nebraska
- Coordinates: 40°38′51″N 98°50′50″W
- Country: United States
- State: Nebraska
- County: Kearney
- Elevation: 2,064 ft (629 m)
- Time zone: UTC-6 (Central (CST))
  - Summer (DST): UTC-5 (CDT)
- ZIP code: 68840
- Area code: 308
- GNIS feature ID: 830936

Lowell is an unincorporated community in Kearney County, Nebraska, United States.

== History ==
A post office was established at Lowell in the 1870s. Lowell was named for James Russell Lowell, an American poet.
