= Kearney County, Nebraska =

County in Nebraska, United States

- County
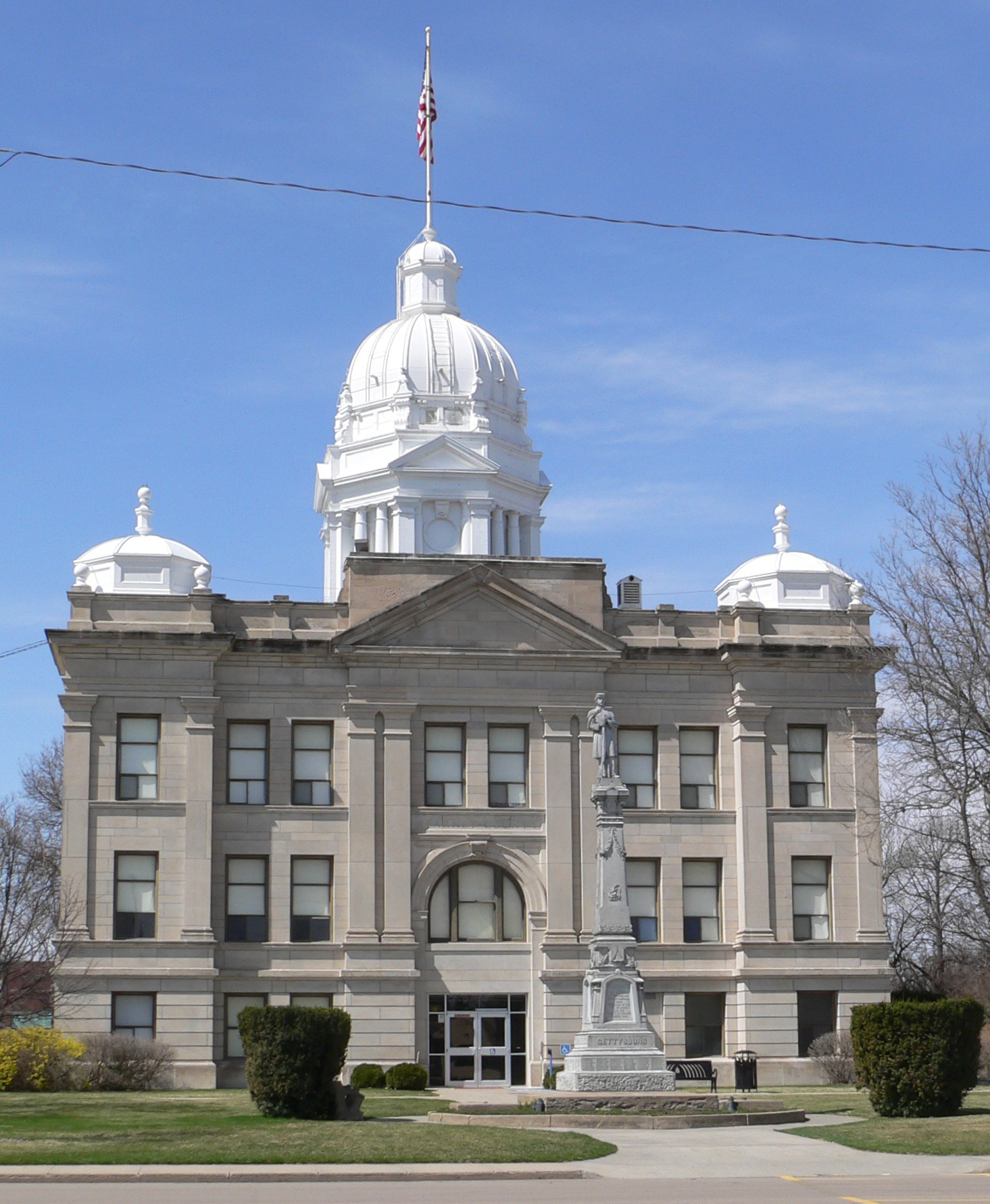
- Kearney County Courthouse in Minden

- Location within the U.S. state of Nebraska
- Coordinates: 40°31′N 98°57′W
- Country: United States
- State: Nebraska
- Founded: 1860
- Named for: Fort Kearny
- Seat: Minden
- Largest city: Minden

Area
  - Total: 516 sq mi (1,340 km^{2})
  - Land: 516 sq mi (1,340 km^{2})
  - Water: 0.1 sq mi (0.26 km^{2}) 0.02%

Population (2020)
  - Total: 6,688
  - Estimate (2025): 6,790 ▲
  - Density: 13.0/sq mi (5.00/km^{2})
- Time zone: UTC−6 (Central)
  - Summer (DST): UTC−5 (CDT)
- Congressional district: 3rd
- Website: www.kearneycounty.ne.gov

Kearney County is a county located in the U.S. state of Nebraska. As of the 2020 United States census, the population was 6,688. Its county seat is Minden. The county was formed in 1860. It was named for Fort Kearny, which in turn was named for Brigade General Stephen W. Kearny.

Kearney County is part of the Kearney Micropolitan Statistical Area.

In the Nebraska license plate system, Kearney County is represented by the prefix 52 (it had the 52nd-largest number of vehicles registered in the county when the license plate system was established in 1922).

== Geography ==
The terrain of Kearney County consists of gently rolling low hills, mostly devoted to agriculture. The Platte River flows eastward along the north county boundary. The county has a total area of 516 square miles (1,340 km^{2}), of which 516 square miles (1,340 km^{2}) is land and 0.1 square miles (0.26 km^{2}) (0.2%) is water.

=== Major highways ===
- U.S. Highway 6
- U.S. Highway 34
- Nebraska Highway 10
- Nebraska Highway 44
- Nebraska Highway 74

=== Adjacent counties ===
- Buffalo County - north
- Adams County - east
- Webster County - southeast
- Franklin County - south
- Harlan County - southwest
- Phelps County - west

=== Protected areas ===
- Clark Federal Waterfowl Production Area
- Fort Kearny State Historical Park
- Fort Kearny State Recreation Area (partial)
- Jensen Lagoon National Wildlife Management Area
- Prairie Dog Federal Waterfowl Production Area
- Youngson Lagoon Natural Wildlife Production Area

== Demographics ==
Historical population
Census	Pop.	Note	%±
1860	474		—
1870	58		−87.8%
1880	4,072		6,920.7%
1890	9,061		122.5%
1900	9,866		8.9%
1910	9,106		−7.7%
1920	8,583		−5.7%
1930	8,094		−5.7%
1940	6,854		−15.3%
1950	6,409		−6.5%
1960	6,580		2.7%
1970	6,707		1.9%
1980	7,053		5.2%
1990	6,629		−6.0%
2000	6,882		3.8%
2010	6,489		−5.7%
2020	6,688		3.1%
2025 (est.)	6,790	▲	1.5%
US Decennial Census; 1790-1960 1900-1990; 1990-2000 2010

=== 2020 census ===
As of the 2020 census, the county had a population of 6,688. The median age was 41.0 years. 25.2% of residents were under the age of 18 and 20.0% of residents were 65 years of age or older. For every 100 females there were 100.6 males, and for every 100 females age 18 and over there were 99.7 males age 18 and over.

The racial makeup of the county was 92.1% White, 0.0% Black or African American, 0.3% American Indian and Alaska Native, 0.2% Asian, 0.1% Native Hawaiian and Pacific Islander, 2.6% from some other race, and 4.7% from two or more races. Hispanic or Latino residents of any race comprised 5.8% of the population.

0.0% of residents lived in urban areas, while 100.0% lived in rural areas.

There were 2,727 households in the county, of which 29.3% had children under the age of 18 living with them and 19.7% had a female householder with no spouse or partner present. About 28.6% of all households were made up of individuals and 14.4% had someone living alone who was 65 years of age or older.

There were 2,966 housing units, of which 8.1% were vacant. Among occupied housing units, 75.7% were owner-occupied and 24.3% were renter-occupied. The homeowner vacancy rate was 1.3% and the rental vacancy rate was 6.3%.

=== 2000 census ===
As of the 2000 United States census there were 6,882 people, 2,643 households, and 1,902 families in the county. The population density was 13 people per square mile (5.0 people/km^{2}). There were 2,846 housing units at an average density of 6 units per square mile (2.3/km^{2}). The racial makeup of the county was 97.82% White, 0.16% Black or African American, 0.20% Native American, 0.23% Asian, 0.01% Pacific Islander, 0.99% from other races, and 0.58% from two or more races. 2.34% of the population were Hispanic or Latino of any race.

There were 2,643 households, out of which 34.40% had children under the age of 18 living with them, 62.90% were married couples living together, 6.40% had a female householder with no husband present, and 28.00% were non-families. 24.30% of all households were made up of individuals, and 10.90% had someone living alone who was 65 years of age or older. The average household size was 2.50 and the average family size was 2.98.

The county population contained 80% under the age of 18, 6.40% from 18 to 24, 27.50% from 25 to 44, 22.70% from 45 to 64, and 16.70% who were 65 years of age or older. The median age was 39 years. For every 100 females, there were 98.40 males. For every 100 females age 18 and over, there were 94.60 males.

The median income for a household in the county was $39,247, and the median income for a family was $44,877. Males had a median income of $29,987 versus $20,081 for females. The per capita income for the county was $18,118. About 5.50% of families and 8.50% of the population were below the poverty line, including 10.00% of those under age 18 and 6.80% of those age 65 or over.

== Communities ==
=== City ===
- Minden (county seat)

=== Villages ===
- Axtell
- Heartwell
- Norman
- Wilcox

=== Unincorporated communities ===
- Keene
- Lowell
- Newark

=== Ghost town ===
- Dobytown

=== Townships ===
- Blaine
- Cosmo
- Eaton
- Grant
- Hayes
- Liberty
- Lincoln
- Logan
- Lowell
- May
- Mirage
- Newark
- Oneida
- Sherman

== Notable people ==
- Carl Curtis, Republican in the U.S. House of Representatives and U.S. Senate

== Politics ==
Kearney County voters are strongly Republican. In only one national election since 1936 has the county selected the Democratic Party candidate.

United States presidential election results for Kearney County, Nebraska
Year	Republican		Democratic		Third party(ies)	
Year	No.	%	No.	%	No.	%
1900	1,055	47.20%	1,109	49.62%	71	3.18%
1904	1,235	57.98%	396	18.59%	499	23.43%
1908	993	42.88%	1,174	50.69%	149	6.43%
1912	336	16.15%	1,012	48.65%	732	35.19%
1916	760	34.20%	1,396	62.83%	66	2.97%
1920	1,683	55.31%	1,273	41.83%	87	2.86%
1924	1,453	45.04%	1,243	38.53%	530	16.43%
1928	2,426	68.28%	1,093	30.76%	34	0.96%
1932	1,129	31.63%	2,367	66.32%	73	2.05%
1936	1,214	32.71%	2,445	65.89%	52	1.40%
1940	1,792	53.44%	1,561	46.56%	0	0.00%
1944	1,782	58.45%	1,267	41.55%	0	0.00%
1948	1,440	50.70%	1,400	49.30%	0	0.00%
1952	2,422	72.26%	930	27.74%	0	0.00%
1956	2,158	64.80%	1,172	35.20%	0	0.00%
1960	2,065	62.05%	1,263	37.95%	0	0.00%
1964	1,352	43.35%	1,767	56.65%	0	0.00%
1968	1,806	64.00%	825	29.23%	191	6.77%
1972	2,203	74.38%	759	25.62%	0	0.00%
1976	1,830	58.58%	1,219	39.02%	75	2.40%
1980	2,512	71.16%	726	20.57%	292	8.27%
1984	2,508	76.89%	726	22.26%	28	0.86%
1988	2,121	65.99%	1,056	32.86%	37	1.15%
1992	1,756	53.72%	645	19.73%	868	26.55%
1996	1,953	64.07%	782	25.66%	313	10.27%
2000	2,333	74.73%	680	21.78%	109	3.49%
2004	2,621	77.57%	707	20.92%	51	1.51%
2008	2,224	70.60%	876	27.81%	50	1.59%
2012	2,349	73.87%	773	24.31%	58	1.82%
2016	2,531	76.79%	550	16.69%	215	6.52%
2020	2,822	78.02%	701	19.38%	94	2.60%
2024	2,828	78.23%	736	20.36%	51	1.41%

== See also ==
- National Register of Historic Places listings in Kearney County, Nebraska
