= Axtell, Nebraska =

- Village
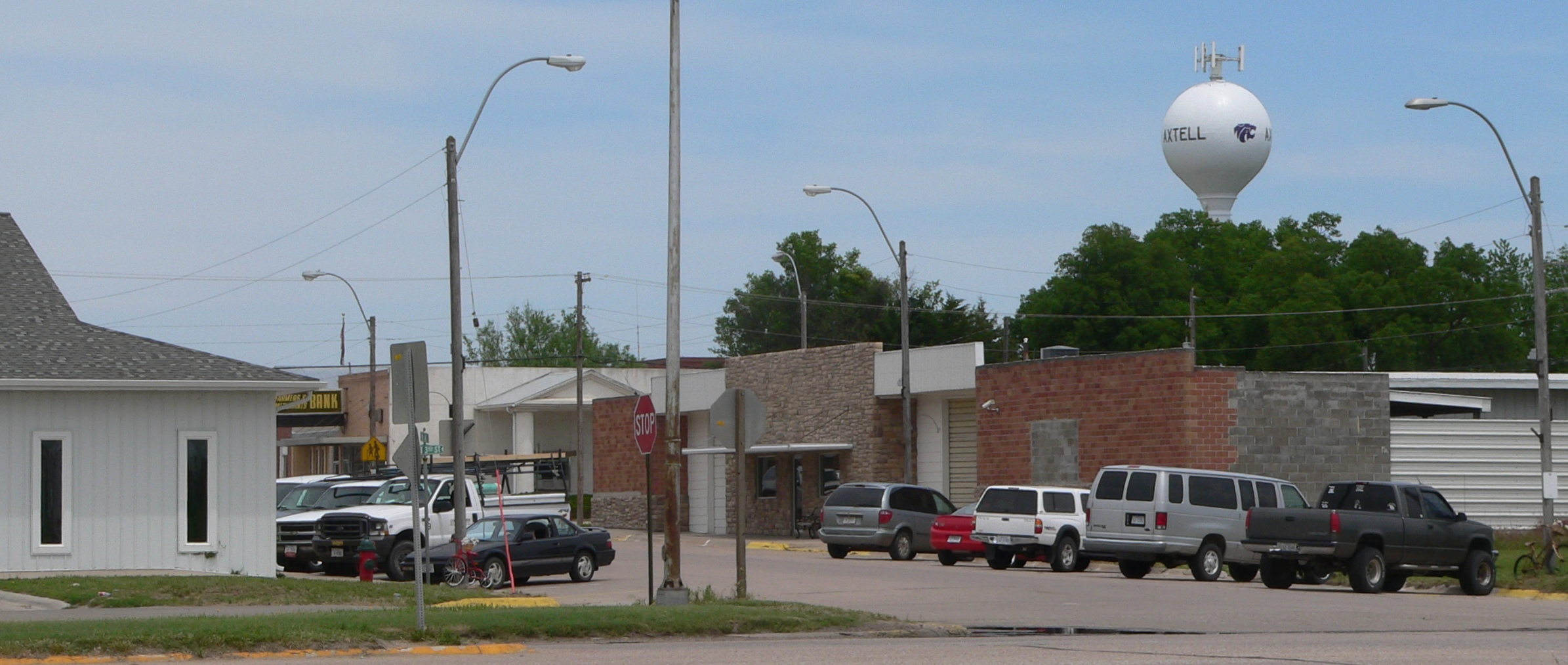
- Downtown Axtell: east side of Main Street
- Nickname: The Windmill City
- Location of Axtell, Nebraska
- Coordinates: 40°28′48″N 99°7′38″W
- Country: United States
- State: Nebraska
- County: Kearney
- Incorporated: 1885

Area
  - Total: 0.46 sq mi (1.20 km^{2})
  - Land: 0.46 sq mi (1.20 km^{2})
  - Water: 0 sq mi (0.00 km^{2})
- Elevation: 2,225 ft (678 m)

Population (2020)
  - Total: 732
  - Estimate (2021): 749
  - Density: 1,580/sq mi (610/km^{2})
- Time zone: UTC-6 (Central (CST))
  - Summer (DST): UTC-5 (CDT)
- ZIP code: 68924
- Area code: 308
- FIPS code: 31-02830
- GNIS feature ID: 2398014

Axtell is a village in western Kearney County in the state of Nebraska, in the Midwestern United States. It is part of the Kearney, Nebraska Micropolitan Statistical Area. The population was 732 at the 2020 census.

== History ==
The first settlement at Axtell was made in the 1870s. Axtell was incorporated as a village in 1885 when the Burlington & Missouri River Railroad was extended to that point. It was named for a railroad worker.

== Geography ==
According to the United States Census Bureau, the village has a total area of 0.44 square miles (1.14 km^{2}), all land.

== Demographics ==
Historical population
Census	Pop.	Note	%±
1890	262		—
1900	329		25.6%
1910	394		19.8%
1920	385		−2.3%
1930	328		−14.8%
1940	295		−10.1%
1950	352		19.3%
1960	477		35.5%
1970	500		4.8%
1980	602		20.4%
1990	707		17.4%
2000	696		−1.6%
2010	726		4.3%
2020	732		0.8%
2021 (est.)	749	▲	2.3%
U.S. Decennial Census

=== 2010 census ===
As of the census of 2010, there were 726 people, 276 households, and 208 families living in the village. The population density was 1,650.0 inhabitants per square mile (637.1/km^{2}). There were 293 housing units at an average density of 665.9 per square mile (257.1/km^{2}). The racial makeup of the village was 97.4% White, 0.6% Native American, 0.1% Asian, 0.8% from other races, and 1.1% from two or more races. Hispanic or Latino of any race were 1.2% of the population.

There were 276 households, of which 39.1% had children under the age of 18 living with them, 64.9% were married couples living together, 6.9% had a female householder with no husband present, 3.6% had a male householder with no wife present, and 24.6% were non-families. 21.4% of all households were made up of individuals, and 8.3% had someone living alone who was 65 years of age or older. The average household size was 2.63 and the average family size was 3.06.

The median age in the village was 36.2 years. 28.9% of residents were under the age of 18; 5.4% were between the ages of 18 and 24; 24.8% were from 25 to 44; 27.1% were from 45 to 64; and 13.6% were 65 years of age or older. The gender makeup of the village was 49.6% male and 50.4% female.

=== 2000 census ===
As of the census of 2000, there were 696 people, 258 households, and 190 families living in the village. The population density was 1,808.9 inhabitants per square mile (698.4/km^{2}). There were 277 housing units at an average density of 719.9 per square mile (278.0/km^{2}). The racial makeup of the village was 98.85% White, 0.14% Native American, 0.29% Asian, 0.43% from other races, and 0.29% from two or more races. Hispanic or Latino of any race were 1.58% of the population.

There were 258 households, out of which 41.9% had children under the age of 18 living with them, 62.0% were married couples living together, 9.3% had a female householder with no husband present, and 26.0% were non-families. 22.1% of all households were made up of individuals, and 12.4% had someone living alone who was 65 years of age or older. The average household size was 2.68 and the average family size was 3.15.

The median age was 36 years. The age distribution was: 32.3% under the age of 18, 5.6% from 18 to 24, 30.2% from 25 to 44, 19.5% from 45 to 64, and 12.4% aged 65 years or older. For every 100 females, there were 100.6 males. For every 100 females age 18 and over, there were 88.4 males.

As of 2000 the median income for a household in the village was $40,625, and the median income for a family was $41,750. Males had a median income of $28,693 versus $21,875 for females. The per capita income for the village was $16,459. About 7.5% of families and 7.2% of the population were below the poverty line, including 12.0% of those under age 18 and 5.9% of those age 65 or over.

== Economy ==
Basic economic activities in Axtell include farming and farm related occupations.

== Culture ==
Axtell is the site of Mosaic - Bethphage Village of Axtell, which provides services for the developmentally disabled. Bethphage was founded in 1913 by K. G. William Dahl, a minister of the Augustana Evangelical Lutheran Church.

== See also ==
- List of villages in Nebraska
