= Minden, Nebraska =

City in Nebraska, United States

- City
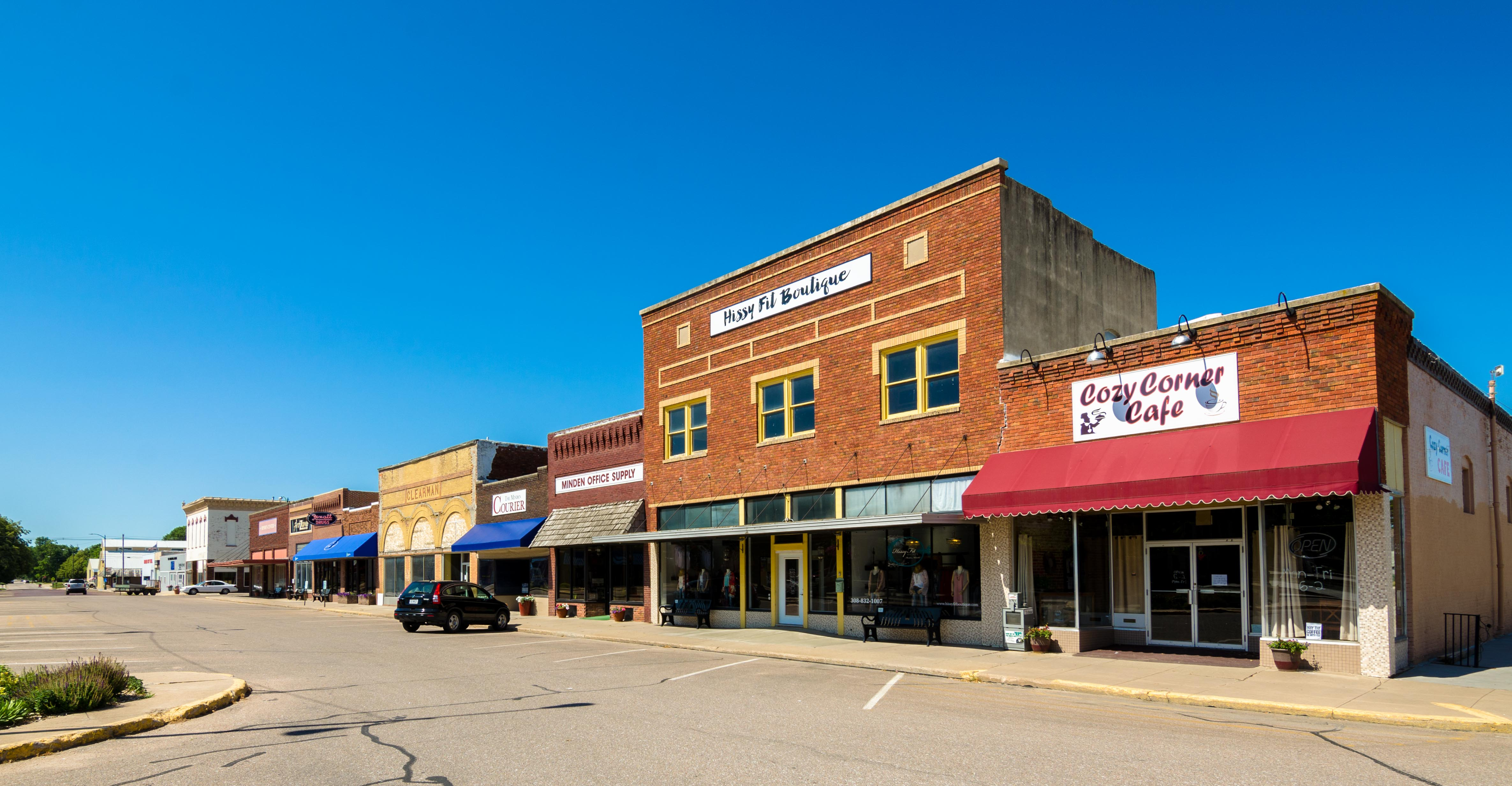
- West side of North Colorado Ave (2017)

- Location with Kearney County and Nebraska
- Coordinates: 40°29′53″N 98°58′01″W
- Country: United States
- State: Nebraska
- County: Kearney
- Founded: 1876
- Named for: Minden, Germany

Area
  - Total: 2.20 sq mi (5.71 km^{2})
  - Land: 2.20 sq mi (5.71 km^{2})
  - Water: 0 sq mi (0.00 km^{2})
- Elevation: 2,182 ft (665 m)

Population (2020)
  - Total: 3,118
  - Density: 1,410/sq mi (546/km^{2})
- Time zone: UTC-6 (Central (CST))
  - Summer (DST): UTC-5 (CDT)
- ZIP Code: 68959
- Area code: 308
- FIPS code: 31-32340
- GNIS ID: 2395341
- Website: mindennebraska.org

Minden is a city in Kearney County, Nebraska, United States. The city serves as the county seat of Kearney County. The population was 3,118 at the 2020 census. It is home to the Pioneer Village museum complex of 28 buildings.

== History ==
Colorado Ave in Minden (1940s)

Minden was established in 1876. The city was named after Minden, in Germany. Minden was originally built up chiefly by Germans. The city has had a post office since 1876.

== Geography ==
According to the United States Census Bureau, the city has a total area of 2.15 square miles (5.57 km^{2}), all land.

=== Climate ===
The highest temperature ever measured in Nebraska, at 118 °F (47.8 °C), was recorded in Minden on July 24, 1936, during the 1936 North American heat wave which occurred during the Dust Bowl era.

Climate data for Minden, Nebraska (1991–2020, extremes 1893–present)
Month	Jan	Feb	Mar	Apr	May	Jun	Jul	Aug	Sep	Oct	Nov	Dec	Year
Record high °F (°C)	78 (26)	81 (27)	92 (33)	99 (37)	105 (41)	110 (43)	118 (48)	114 (46)	107 (42)	97 (36)	82 (28)	80 (27)	118 (48)
Mean maximum °F (°C)	60.2 (15.7)	65.9 (18.8)	77.5 (25.3)	85.4 (29.7)	90.8 (32.7)	96.2 (35.7)	99.3 (37.4)	96.4 (35.8)	93.2 (34.0)	87.0 (30.6)	74.3 (23.5)	61.9 (16.6)	100.0 (37.8)
Mean daily maximum °F (°C)	35.2 (1.8)	39.4 (4.1)	51.4 (10.8)	61.3 (16.3)	71.2 (21.8)	81.9 (27.7)	86.7 (30.4)	84.1 (28.9)	77.4 (25.2)	64.4 (18.0)	49.9 (9.9)	37.3 (2.9)	61.7 (16.5)
Daily mean °F (°C)	24.8 (−4.0)	28.8 (−1.8)	39.1 (3.9)	49.6 (9.8)	60.4 (15.8)	71.1 (21.7)	75.9 (24.4)	73.4 (23.0)	65.4 (18.6)	51.9 (11.1)	38.3 (3.5)	27.3 (−2.6)	50.5 (10.3)
Mean daily minimum °F (°C)	14.5 (−9.7)	18.1 (−7.7)	26.9 (−2.8)	37.9 (3.3)	49.6 (9.8)	60.3 (15.7)	65.0 (18.3)	62.7 (17.1)	53.5 (11.9)	39.4 (4.1)	26.7 (−2.9)	17.4 (−8.1)	39.3 (4.1)
Mean minimum °F (°C)	−6.1 (−21.2)	−1.9 (−18.8)	8.6 (−13.0)	21.6 (−5.8)	33.6 (0.9)	47.2 (8.4)	53.6 (12.0)	50.8 (10.4)	36.5 (2.5)	21.1 (−6.1)	9.3 (−12.6)	−2.0 (−18.9)	−10.8 (−23.8)
Record low °F (°C)	−28 (−33)	−33 (−36)	−17 (−27)	0 (−18)	17 (−8)	35 (2)	42 (6)	36 (2)	20 (−7)	1 (−17)	−15 (−26)	−31 (−35)	−33 (−36)
Average precipitation inches (mm)	0.48 (12)	0.55 (14)	1.33 (34)	2.38 (60)	4.52 (115)	3.91 (99)	3.61 (92)	3.19 (81)	1.88 (48)	2.11 (54)	0.96 (24)	0.74 (19)	25.66 (652)
Average snowfall inches (cm)	5.6 (14)	7.2 (18)	3.3 (8.4)	1.5 (3.8)	0.0 (0.0)	0.0 (0.0)	0.0 (0.0)	0.0 (0.0)	0.0 (0.0)	0.6 (1.5)	2.4 (6.1)	4.2 (11)	24.8 (63)
Average precipitation days (≥ 0.01 in)	4.1	4.5	5.8	8.2	11.2	9.6	8.8	8.3	6.2	5.8	3.8	3.7	80.0
Average snowy days (≥ 0.1 in)	3.4	3.4	1.7	0.9	0.0	0.0	0.0	0.0	0.0	0.3	1.2	3.0	13.9
Source: NOAA

== Demographics ==
Historical population
Census	Pop.	Note	%±
1880	98		—
1890	1,380		1,308.2%
1900	1,238		−10.3%
1910	1,559		25.9%
1920	1,527		−2.1%
1930	1,716		12.4%
1940	1,848		7.7%
1950	2,120		14.7%
1960	2,383		12.4%
1970	2,669		12.0%
1980	2,939		10.1%
1990	2,749		−6.5%
2000	2,964		7.8%
2010	2,923		−1.4%
2020	3,118		6.7%
U.S. Decennial Census; 2012 Estimate

Minden is part of the Kearney, Nebraska Micropolitan Statistical Area.

=== 2020 census ===
As of the 2020 census, Minden had a population of 3,118. The median age was 38.1 years. 26.3% of residents were under the age of 18 and 19.2% of residents were 65 years of age or older. For every 100 females there were 93.9 males, and for every 100 females age 18 and over there were 92.9 males age 18 and over.

0.0% of residents lived in urban areas, while 100.0% lived in rural areas.

There were 1,272 households in Minden, of which 30.3% had children under the age of 18 living in them. Of all households, 49.9% were married-couple households, 18.2% were households with a male householder and no spouse or partner present, and 25.6% were households with a female householder and no spouse or partner present. About 33.8% of all households were made up of individuals and 18.1% had someone living alone who was 65 years of age or older.

There were 1,366 housing units, of which 6.9% were vacant. The homeowner vacancy rate was 1.8% and the rental vacancy rate was 7.2%.

Racial composition as of the 2020 census
Race	Number	Percent
White	2,800	89.8%
Black or African American	3	0.1%
American Indian and Alaska Native	10	0.3%
Asian	6	0.2%
Native Hawaiian and Other Pacific Islander	7	0.2%
Some other race	121	3.9%
Two or more races	171	5.5%
Hispanic or Latino (of any race)	264	8.5%

=== 2010 census ===
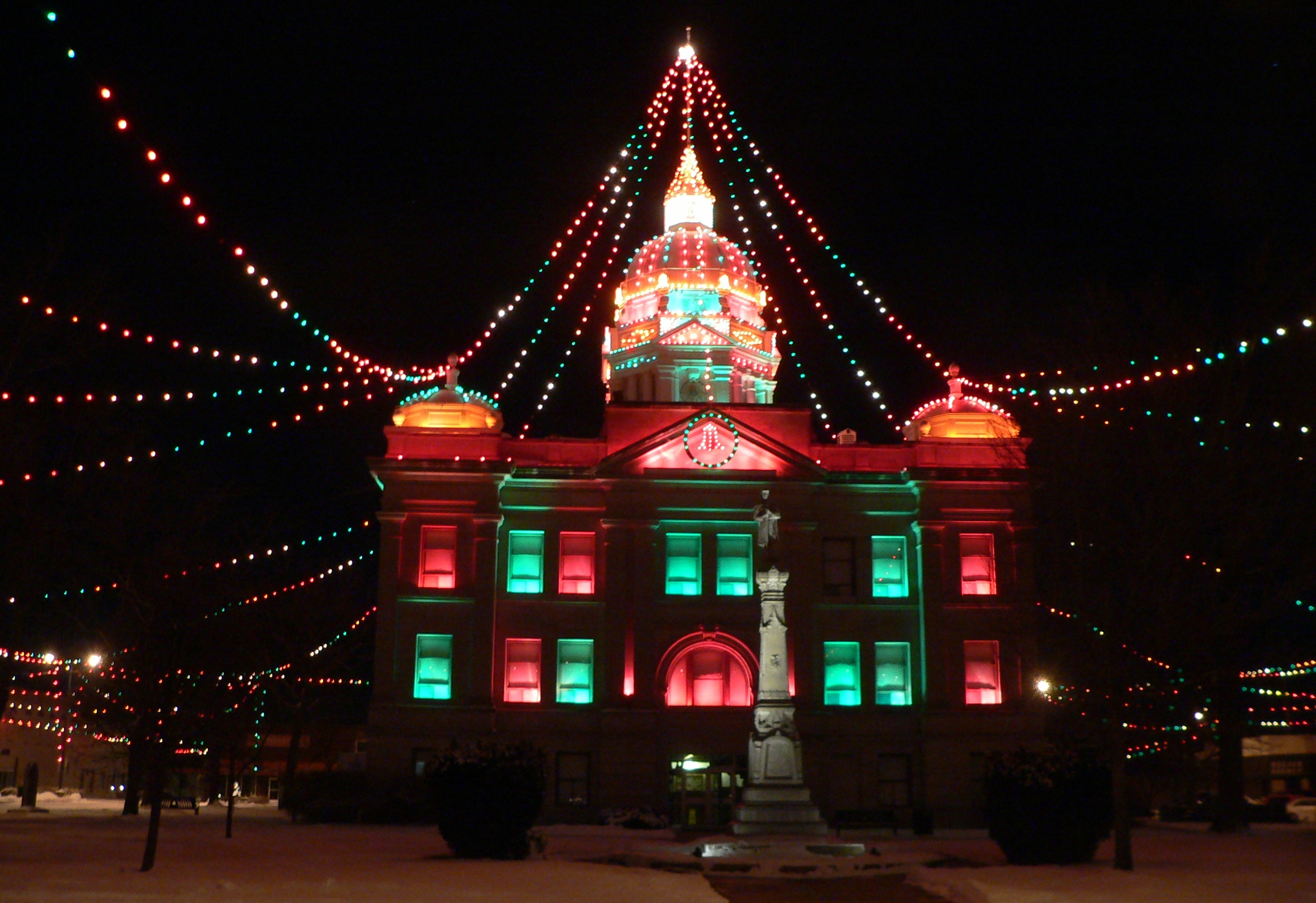
Christmas lights in Minden's courthouse square (2011)

As of the census of 2010, there were 2,923 people, 1,256 households, and 791 families residing in the city. The population density was 1,359.5 inhabitants per square mile (524.9/km^{2}). There were 1,339 housing units at an average density of 622.8 per square mile (240.5/km^{2}). The racial makeup of the city was 96.4% White, 0.4% African American, 0.2% Native American, 0.2% Asian, 1.4% from other races, and 1.4% from two or more races. Hispanic or Latino of any race were 5.2% of the population.

There were 1,256 households, of which 28.7% had children under the age of 18 living with them, 52.2% were married couples living together, 7.5% had a female householder with no husband present, 3.3% had a male householder with no wife present, and 37.0% were non-families. 32.9% of all households were made up of individuals, and 17.8% had someone living alone who was 65 years of age or older. The average household size was 2.26 and the average family size was 2.86.

The median age in the city was 43.1 years. 22.9% of residents were under the age of 18; 6.7% were between the ages of 18 and 24; 22.9% were from 25 to 44; 25.4% were from 45 to 64; and 22.1% were 65 years of age or older. The gender makeup of the city was 46.5% male and 53.5% female.

=== 2000 census ===
As of the census of 2000, there were 2,964 people, 1,185 households, and 811 families residing in the city. The population density was 1,809.7 inhabitants per square mile (698.7/km^{2}). There were 1,269 housing units at an average density of 774.8 per square mile (299.2/km^{2}). The racial makeup of the city was 98.65% White, 0.17% African American, 0.24% Native American, 0.10% Asian, 0.44% from other races, and 0.40% from two or more races. Hispanic or Latino of any race were 2.33% of the population.

There were 1,185 households, out of which 32.0% had children under the age of 18 living with them, 59.2% were married couples living together, 7.4% had a female householder with no husband present, and 31.5% were non-families. 27.8% of all households were made up of individuals, and 13.9% had someone living alone who was 65 years of age or older. The average household size was 2.38 and the average family size was 2.89.

The median age was 40 years. The age distribution was: 24.9% under the age of 18, 6.5% from 18 to 24, 25.5% from 25 to 44, 21.3% from 45 to 64, and 21.8% aged 65 years or older. For every 100 females, there were 87.4 males. For every 100 females age 18 and over, there were 82.7 males.

The median income for a household in the city was $40,092, and the median income for a family was $47,356. Males had a median income of $29,267 versus $18,929 for females. The per capita income for the city was $18,847. About 2.3% of families and 5.3% of the population were below the poverty line, including 5.8% of those under age 18 and 6.7% of those age 65 or over.

== Attractions ==
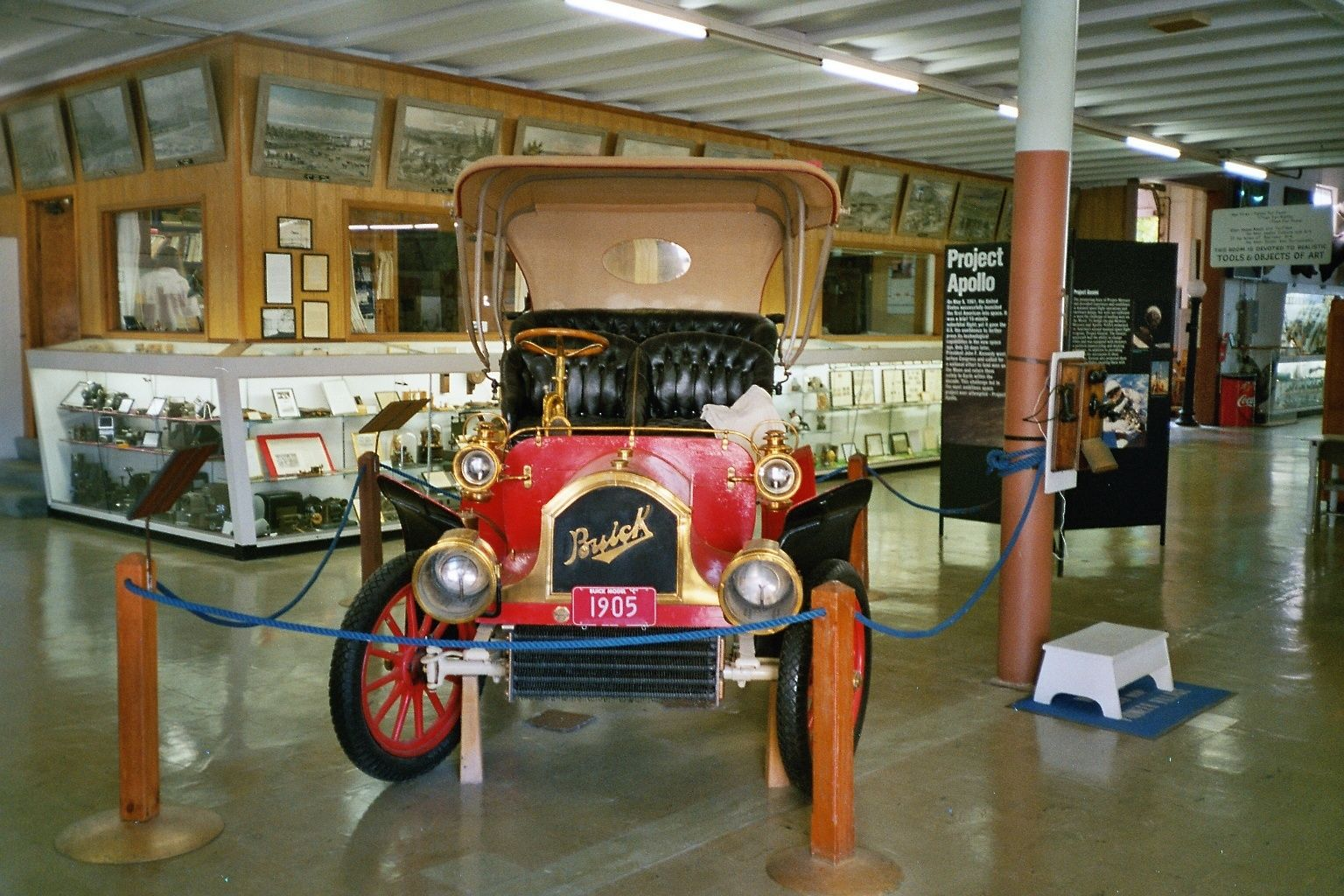
Pioneer Village (2005)

Minden is the home of the Pioneer Village, a museum complex of 28 buildings on 20 acres (81,000 m^{2}) with a total collection of over 50,000 items.

Minden bills itself as "Nebraska's Christmas City", illuminating the courthouse square with a display of over 12,000 bulbs and staging an annual Christmas pageant titled "The Light Of The World". The lighting of the courthouse was begun in 1915, when lights were acquired with the intention of stringing them from the railroad station to the town square for the state G.A.R. convention. Weather precluded this use, and the lights were repurposed for a Christmas display.

== Notable people ==
- Charles Binderup, U.S. Congressman
- Carl Curtis, U.S. Congressman and Senator
- Otto Miller, nicknamed "Moonie", a catcher in Major League Baseball from 1910 through 1922 for Brooklyn.
- Norbert Tiemann, 32nd governor of Nebraska
- Harold Warp, businessman in the plastics industry
