= Area code 308 =

Telephone area code for western Nebraska, United States

Coordinates: 41°N 101°W

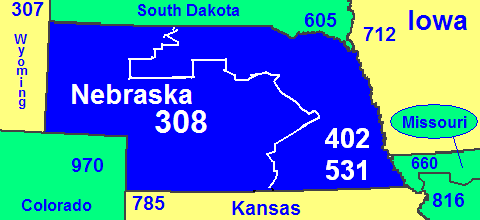
Nebraska's numbering plan areas and area codes (blue)

Area code 308 is the telephone area code in the North American Numbering Plan (NANP) for western Nebraska. It was created in 1954, by dividing the state, which had been a single numbering plan area (NPA), along a roughly S-shaped boundary line from the western half of the Nebraska–South Dakota border to the approximate center of the Nebraska–Kansas border. A roughly 50-mile segment of the line running northeast to southwest in the eastern third of the state follows the Platte River.

With Nebraska's population concentrated in the east in the cities of Omaha and Lincoln, numbering plan area 308 is one of the most sparsely populated in the nation. According to projections in 2020, 308's supply of telephone numbers is in no danger of exhaustion until at least 2050.

== Service area ==
Major towns in the service area are:

- Alliance
- Chadron
- Gering
- Grand Island
- Kearney
- McCook
- North Platte
- Ogallala
- Scottsbluff
- Sidney

== See also ==
- List of Nebraska area codes
- List of North American Numbering Plan area codes

Nebraska area codes: 308, 402/531
	North: 605	
West: 970, 307	308	East: 402/531
	South: 785. 970	
Colorado area codes: 303/720/983, 719, 748/970
Kansas area codes: 316, 620, 785, 913
South Dakota area codes: 605
Wyoming area codes: 307
