= Nebraska Legislature 38th district =

American legislative district

Nebraska's 38th legislative district
- Map of Nebraska Legislature districts with the 38th district shaded in red
Senator
| Dave Murman; R–Glenvil |
since 2019
- Demographics: 92.3% White; 0.4% Black; 5.5% Hispanic; 0.2% Asian; 0.4% Native American
- Population (2020): 41,141

The Nebraska Legislature's 38th district is one of the 49 legislative districts in the Nebraska Legislature. The district is located in southern Nebraska and covers Clay, Franklin, Furnas, Harlan, Franklin, Nuckolls, Red Willow, Webster and part of Phelps counties. Notable settlements in the area include McCook, Holdrege, Superior, Sutton, and Alma. Dave Murman has represented the district since 2019.

== Demographics ==
The US Census Bureau recorded the population as of 2020 at 41,141.

- 92.3% of the district is White.
- 5.5% of the district is Hispanic.
- 0.4% of the district is Black.
- 0.4% of the district is Native American.
- 0.2% of the district is Asian.

== List of senators ==
| Senator | Party | Years of service | Legislature | Residence |
|---|---|---|---|---|
| Dave Murman | Republican | 2019 - present | 109th | Glenvil |
| John Kuehn | Republican | 2015-2019 | 105th-108th | Heartwell |
| Tom Carlson | Republican | 2007-2015 | 103rd-104th | Holdrege |
| Ed Schrock | Republican | 1995-2007 | 103rd-104th | Elm Creek |
| Owen Elmer | Republican | 1987-1994 | 103rd-104th | Indianola |
| Tom Vickers | Democratic | 1983-1987 | 103rd-104th | Farnam |
| Tom Vickers | Republican | 1979-1983 | 103rd-104th | Farnam |
