= Holdrege High School =

Location
- 600 12th Avenue; Holdrege, Nebraska 68949; United States; 40°26′51″N 99°22′23″W

Information
- School type: High school
- Founded: 1960
- School district: Holdrege Public Schools
- Superintendent: Todd Hilyard
- Principal: Jeremy Ham
- Teaching staff: 27.49 (on an FTE basis)
- Grades: 9–12
- Enrollment: 315 (2023–2024)
- Student to teacher ratio: 11.46
- Language: English
- Colors: Purple & Gold
- Mascot: Dusters
- Website: Official Site

Holdrege High School is a public high school located in Phelps County, Nebraska. It serves 9 to 12 grade students and the current school site was completed in 1960.

== Notable alumni ==
- Todd Brown, former football player
- Tom Carlson, former Nebraska state senator
- Ed Schrock, former Nebraska state senator
- Scott Strasburger, former football player
