= Westmark, Nebraska =

- Unincorporated community
- Location within Nebraska Location within the United States
- Coordinates: 40°35′52″N 99°31′48″W
- Country: United States
- State: Nebraska
- County: Phelps
- Elevation: 2,398 ft (731 m)
- Time zone: UTC-6 (Central (CST))
  - Summer (DST): UTC-5 (CDT)
- Area code: 308
- GNIS feature ID: 835478

Westmark is an unincorporated community in Phelps County, Nebraska, United States. Westmark is 7.4 miles (11.9 km) northeast of Bertrand and 13.6 miles (21.9 km) northwest of Holdrege, the county seat of Phelps County.

== History ==
A post office was established at Westmark in 1879, and remained in operation until it was discontinued in 1903. Westmark was likely named for a pioneer settler.
