= Joy Berquist =

American football player, lawyer and judge (1901–1942)

Profile
- Position: Guard

Personal information
- Born: July 30, 1901; Loomis, Nebraska
- Died: May 18, 1942 (aged 40)
- Listed height: 6 ft 3 in (1.91 m)
- Listed weight: 235 lb (107 kg)

Career information
- High school: Lincoln (NE)
- College: Nebraska

Career history
- Kansas City Blues (1924); Kansas City Cowboys (1926); Chicago Cardinals (1927)

Awards and highlights
- Second-team All-Pro (1926)
- Stats at Pro Football Reference

Joy Theodore John Berquist (July 30, 1901 – May 18, 1942), sometimes known as "Teddie" Berquist, and known professionally as J. T. Berquist, was an American football player, lawyer, and judge. He played college football for Nebraska and in the National Football League (NFL) for the Kansas City Blues/Cowboys (1924, 1926) and Chicago Cardinals (1927).

== Early life ==
Berquist in Loomis, Nebraska, and raised on a farm in Westmark Township. He attended high school in Holdrege, Nebraska. He then enrolled at the University of Nebraska and played college football for the Nebraska Cornhuskers football team from 1921 to 1923.

== Professional football ==
Berquist played professional football for the Akron Pros/Indians in the National Football League (NFL) for the Kansas City Blues (1924), Kansas City Cowboys (1926), and Chicago Cardinals (1927). He appeared in 20 NFL games, 18 of them as a starter. He was known for his ability to create holes for Kansas City's backs in the opposing forward wall. He was selected as a second-team All-Pro end in 1926.

== Later years and family ==
Berquist was married in 1925 to Louise Lesh. While still playing football, Berquist became a lawyer in Lexington, Nebraska. He later became a Dawson County judge. He died suddenly of a heart attack in 1942 at age 40.
