= Scott Strasburger =

German gridiron football player (born 1963)

No. 90
- Position: Defensive end

Personal information
- Born: February 14, 1963 (age 63); Stuttgart, West Germany
- Listed height: 6 ft 1 in (1.85 m)
- Listed weight: 220 lb (100 kg)

Career information
- High school: Holdrege (Holdrege, Nebraska, U.S.)
- College: Nebraska
- NFL draft: 1985: 9th round, 243rd overall pick

Career history
- Dallas Cowboys (1985–1986)*
- * Offseason or practice squad member only

Awards and highlights
- Third-team All-American (1984); First-team All-Big Eight (1984)

Scott Strasburger (born February 14, 1963) is a former American football defensive end. He played college football at the University of Nebraska–Lincoln.

== Early life ==
Strasburger attended Holdrege High School, where he was a starter at defensive end and was named All-state as a senior. He walked-on at the University of Nebraska–Lincoln.

As a true sophomore, he was a backup right defensive end behind All-Big Eight selection Tony Felici. He made 31 tackles and 6 sacks. His most famous play came in the eleventh game against Oklahoma University, intercepting a pass late in the fourth quarter that he returned 22 yards to the opponent's one yard in the final 30 seconds of the game, helping the team clinch a 28–24 victory and win the Big Eight Conference Championship. He was named the starter for the 1983 Orange Bowl against Louisiana State University.

As a junior, he was named a full-time starter at standup right defensive end. He made 42 tackles (22 solo), 3 pass breakups and 2 fumble recoveries (led the team). He made 10 tackles against Oklahoma State University.

As a senior, he made 12 tackles for loss (tied team lead), 7 pass breakups (school record for linemen). He made 7 tackles (5 solo), 2 sacks, 2 pass breakups and one fumble recovery against UCLA. He earned a National Football Hall of Fame scholarship. He finished with 15 career sacks.

In 1984, he was inducted into the College Football Hall of Fame as a scholar. In 2005, he was inducted into the Nebraska Athletics Hall of Fame.

== Professional career ==
Strasburger was selected by the Dallas Cowboys in the ninth round (243rd overall) of the 1985 NFL draft, to play him at outside linebacker. He was released on September 2. In 1986, he was re-signed by the Cowboys and was released on August 23.
