= Senator Schrock =

Senator Schrock may refer to:

- Ed Schrock (Nebraska politician) (born 1943), Nebraska State Senate
- Ed Schrock (born 1941), Virginia State Senate
