= Sacramento, Nebraska =

- Unincorporated community
- Location within Nebraska Location within the United States
- Coordinates: 40°24′32″N 99°16′30″W
- Country: United States
- State: Nebraska
- County: Phelps
- Elevation: 2,267 ft (691 m)
- Time zone: UTC-6 (Central (CST))
  - Summer (DST): UTC-5 (CDT)
- Area code: 308
- GNIS feature ID: 835437

Sacramento is an unincorporated community in Phelps County, Nebraska, United States. Sacramento is 5.7 miles (9.2 km) east-southeast of Holdrege.

== History ==
Sacramento had a post office between 1879 and 1944. The community was likely named after Sacramento, California.

Sacramento was located along the Burlington Railroad.
