= Granlund =

Granlund is a surname. Notable people with the surname include:

- Albin Granlund (born 1989), Finnish footballer
- Barbara Granlund (1928–2020), American politician
- Kerstin Granlund (born 1951), Swedish comedian and actress
- Marie Granlund (born 1962), Swedish politician
- Markus Granlund (born 1993), Finnish ice hockey player
- Mattias Granlund (born 1992), Swedish ice hockey player
- Mikael Granlund (born 1992), Finnish ice hockey player
- Nils Granlund (1890–1957), American show producer, entertainment industry entrepreneur and radio industry pioneer
- Odd Granlund (1910–1982), Norwegian broadcaster
- Paul Granlund (1925–2003), American sculptor
- Petra Granlund (born 1987), Swedish swimmer
- Sverre Granlund (1918–1943), Norwegian soldier
- Trond Granlund (born 1950), Norwegian singer and musician
