= Union Township, Phelps County, Nebraska =

Union Township
- Township
- Location in Phelps County
- Coordinates: 40°28′54″N 099°35′12″W
- Country: United States
- State: Nebraska
- County: Phelps

Area
  - Total: 35.83 sq mi (92.81 km^{2})
  - Land: 35.83 sq mi (92.81 km^{2})
  - Water: 0 sq mi (0 km^{2}) 0%
- Elevation: 2,464 ft (751 m)

Population (2000)
  - Total: 523
  - Density: 15/sq mi (5.6/km^{2})
- GNIS feature ID: 0838299

Union Township is one of fourteen townships in Phelps County, Nebraska, United States. The population was 523 at the 2000 census. A 2006 estimate placed the township's population at 525.

A portion of the Village of Bertand lies within the Township.
