= Todd Brown =

American gridiron football player (born 1960)

No. 89, 29, 84, 71
- Position: Wide receiver

Personal information
- Born: July 16, 1960 (age 66); Holdrege, Nebraska, U.S.
- Listed height: 6 ft 1 in (1.85 m)
- Listed weight: 180 lb (82 kg)

Career information
- High school: Holdrege
- College: Nebraska
- NFL draft: 1983: 6th round, 154th overall pick

Career history
- Montreal Concordes (1983–1985); Detroit Lions (1986)*; Saskatchewan Roughriders (1987–1988); Winnipeg Blue Bombers (1988)
- * Offseason or practice squad member only

Todd Brown (born July 16, 1960) is an American former professional football player who was a wide receiver in the Canadian Football League (CFL) for the Montreal Concordes, Saskatchewan Roughriders and Winnipeg Blue Bombers. He played college football for the Nebraska Cornhuskers.

== Early life ==
Brown attended Holdrege High School, where he was a starter at wide receiver and also competed in the triple jump in track. He was named All-state in football as a senior.

He was also considered one of the greatest triple jumpers in the history of Nebraska high school, setting a state record with a 50 feet, 2 1/4 inches leap, while winning the Class B state championship in 1978.

== College career ==
Brown walked-on at the University of Nebraska–Lincoln. He became a starter at wide receiver as a sophomore, leading the team with 28 receptions for 416 yards and 5 touchdowns. As a junior, he had 14 receptions (third on the team), 277 yards (second on the team) and 3 touchdowns (second on the team).

As a senior, he started at wide receiver alongside future Pro Bowler Irving Fryar, leading the team with 23 receptions for 399 yards, a 17.3 -yard average and 4 touchdowns.

He finished his college career with 65 receptions for 1,092 yards, a 16.8-yard average and 12 touchdowns. At the time, he ranked in the top-ten in receiving in school history.

In 2005, he was inducted into the Nebraska High School Sports Hall of Fame. In 2005, he was listed 88th by the Omaha World-Herald, as one of the Nebraska 100 greatest athletes.

== Professional career ==
Brown was selected by the Detroit Lions in the 6th round (154th overall) of the 1983 NFL draft. He also was selected in the 1983 USFL Territorial Draft by the Boston Breakers. He instead opted to sign with the Montreal Concordes of the Canadian Football League on May 7, 1983. As a rookie, he recorded 50 receptions for 731 yards and 2 touchdowns.

On July 21, 1986, he was signed by the Detroit Lions. He was released before the start of the season on August 18.

== Personal life ==
Todd is the founder of Brown Church Development Group, an organization dedicated to providing church leaders ministry solutions. His daughter Ashley, was the Big 12 champion in the 100 metres hurdles at the University of Kansas in 2008.
