= Clyde, Nebraska =

Unincorporated community in Nebraska, United States

- Unincorporated community
- Location within Nebraska Location within the United States
- Coordinates: 40°24′48″N 99°25′05″W
- Country: United States
- State: Nebraska
- County: Phelps
- Elevation: 2,372 ft (723 m)
- Time zone: UTC-6 (Central (CST))
  - Summer (DST): UTC-5 (CDT)
- Area code: 308
- GNIS feature ID: 835273

Clyde is an unincorporated community in Phelps County, Nebraska, United States. Clyde is located along U.S. Routes 6 and 34, 2.9 miles (4.7 km) southwest of Holdrege.
