= Phelps County Courthouse =

Phelps County Courthouse may refer to:

- Phelps County Courthouse (Missouri), Rolla, Missouri
- Phelps County Courthouse (Nebraska), Holdrege, Nebraska
