= John Kuehn =

American politician (born 1974)

Member of the Nebraska Legislature from the 38th district
- In office January 2015 – January 9, 2019
- Preceded by: Tom Carlson
- Succeeded by: Dave Murman

Personal details
- Born: May 26, 1974 (age 52) Heartwell, Nebraska, U.S.
- Party: Republican
- Education: Hastings College (BS); Kansas State University (DVM)

John Kuehn (born May 26, 1974) is a politician from the state of Nebraska in the Midwestern United States. In 2014, he was elected to the Nebraska Legislature, representing a district in the south central part of the state. Kuehn is a member of the Republican Party.

== Personal life and professional career ==
Kuehn was born on May 26, 1974, in Heartwell, Nebraska. He grew up on his family's farm and graduated from high school in Minden in 1992. He attended Hastings College, graduating in 1996 with a B.A. in biology; he then studied veterinary medicine at Kansas State University, receiving his D.V.M. in 2000.

He returned to Nebraska and worked in a group veterinary practice in Hastings from 2000 to 2002. He then established his practice, Kuehn Animal Health. In addition to the veterinary practice, he raised cattle and quarter horses on his farm near Heartwell. In 2004, he took on an additional position, joining the Hastings College faculty as an associate professor of biology.

== Political career ==
In 2009, Kuehn was named to fill the vacant Kearney County seat on the Southern Power District board of directors. The district is a publicly owned utility that provides electricity to the rural portions of Adams, Franklin, Hall, Hamilton, Kearney, Merrick, and Phelps Counties in south central Nebraska. In 2010, Kuehn ran unopposed for the remaining two years of the term; in 2012, he ran unopposed for a new six-year term. He resigned from the board in early 2015.

=== 2014 election ===
In 2014, Kuehn ran for a seat in the Nebraska Legislature from the 38th District, which covers six counties in south central Nebraska and part of a seventh: Clay, Franklin, Kearney, Nuckolls, Phelps, Webster, and the southwestern part of Buffalo County. The largest city in the district is Holdrege; other cities therein include Minden, Superior, Sutton, Red Cloud, and Franklin. The incumbent, Tom Carlson, a member of the Republican Party, was ineligible to run for a third consecutive term under Nebraska's term-limits law.

Kuehn, a Republican, ran unopposed in the legislative election. Despite the lack of opposition, he raised nearly $43,000 for the campaign and spent about $12,000. Major contributions included $5500 from the Nebraska Realtors PAC and $2100 from the Nebraska Bankers State PAC. The Nebraska Telecommunications Association PAC, which represents local telecommunications companies, contributed $2000; the Glenwood Telephone Membership Corporation, a telecommunications cooperative based in Blue Hill, contributed another $1500. The Nebraska Cooperative Council PAC, a trade organization representing agricultural and other cooperatives in the state, contributed $2000. Republican gubernatorial candidate Pete Ricketts gave $1000 to the Kuehn campaign.

=== Legislative tenure ===
==== 2015 session ====
In the 2015 legislative session, Kuehn was named vice-chair of the special Legislative Performance Audit Committee, which directs reviews of state agency programs to assess how effectively they implement legislative intent. He was also appointed to the Appropriations Committee.

Among the "most significant" actions taken by the Legislature in its 2015 session were three bills that passed over vetoes by governor Pete Ricketts. LB268 repealed the state's death penalty; LB623 reversed the state's previous policy of denying driver's licenses to people who were living illegally in the United States after being brought to the country as children, and who had been granted exemption from deportation under the Barack Obama administration's Deferred Action for Childhood Arrivals (DACA) program; and LB610 increased the tax on gasoline to pay for repairs to roads and bridges. Kuehn voted against the death-penalty repeal, and to sustain Ricketts's veto of the measure; he voted for passage of LB623, and to override the gubernatorial veto; and he voted for passage of the gas-tax increase, and to override the veto.

==== 2016 session ====
In its 2016 session, the Nebraska legislature passed three bills that Ricketts then vetoed. LB580 would have created an independent commission of citizens to draw new district maps following censuses; supporters described it as an attempt to de-politicize the redistricting process, while Ricketts maintained that the bill delegated the legislature's constitutional duty of redistricting to "an unelected and unaccountable board". Kuehn voted against the bill in its 29–15 passage. Sponsor John Murante opted not to seek an override of the governor's veto.

A second vetoed bill, LB935, would have changed state audit procedures. The bill passed by a margin of 37–8, with 4 present and not voting; Kuehn was among those voting in favor. The bill was withdrawn without an attempt to override the veto; the state auditor agreed to work with the governor on a new version for the next year's session.

A third bill passed over Ricketts's veto. LB947 made DACA beneficiaries eligible for commercial and professional licenses in Nebraska. The bill passed the Legislature on a vote of 33–11–5; the veto override passed 31–13–5. Kuehn voted against the bill, and against the override of Ricketts's veto.

The legislature failed to pass LB10, greatly desired by the Republican Party, which would have restored Nebraska to a winner-take-all scheme of allocating its electoral votes in U.S. presidential elections, rather than continuing its practice of awarding the electoral vote for each congressional district to the candidate who received the most votes in that district. Supporters were unable to break a filibuster; in the 32–17 cloture motion, Kuehn was among those who voted in favor of the bill.
