= Schrock =

Schrock or Schröck is a surname. Notable people with the surname include:

- Richard R. Schrock (born 1945), American professor at MIT and winner of the Nobel Prize in Chemistry in 2005
  - Schrock carbene, a chemical group named after the above
- Ed Schrock (born 1941), American politician from Virginia
- Ed Schrock (Nebraska politician) (born 1943), American politician from Nebraska
- Max Schrock (born 1994), American baseball player
- Raymond L. Schrock (1892–1950), American screenwriter
- Stephan Schröck (born 1986), German-Filipino footballer

== See also ==
- Schrock Airport, an airport in Oregon
