= Laird Township =

Laird Township can refer to:

- Laird Township, Ontario
- Laird Township, Michigan
- Laird Township, Phelps County, Nebraska
