= Phelps County Courthouse (Nebraska) =

- U.S. National Register of Historic Places
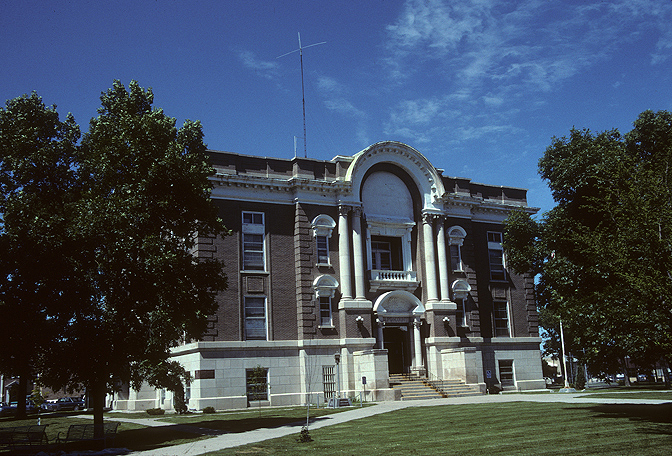
- The courthouse in 1996

- Location within Nebraska Location within the United States
- Location: 5th Ave. between East and West Avenues, Holdrege, Nebraska
- Coordinates: 40°26′22″N 99°22′12″W
- Area: 2 acres (0.81 ha)
- Built: 1910
- Architect: William F. Gernandt
- Architectural style: Beaux Arts
- MPS: County Courthouses of Nebraska MPS
- NRHP reference No.: 89002242
- Added to NRHP: January 10, 1990

The Phelps County Courthouse is a historic building in Holdrege, Nebraska, and the county courthouse for Phelps County, Nebraska. It was built in 1910–1911. It was designed in the Beaux Arts style by architect William F. Gernandt. It has been listed on the National Register of Historic Places since January 10, 1990.
