= Beau McCoy =

American politician

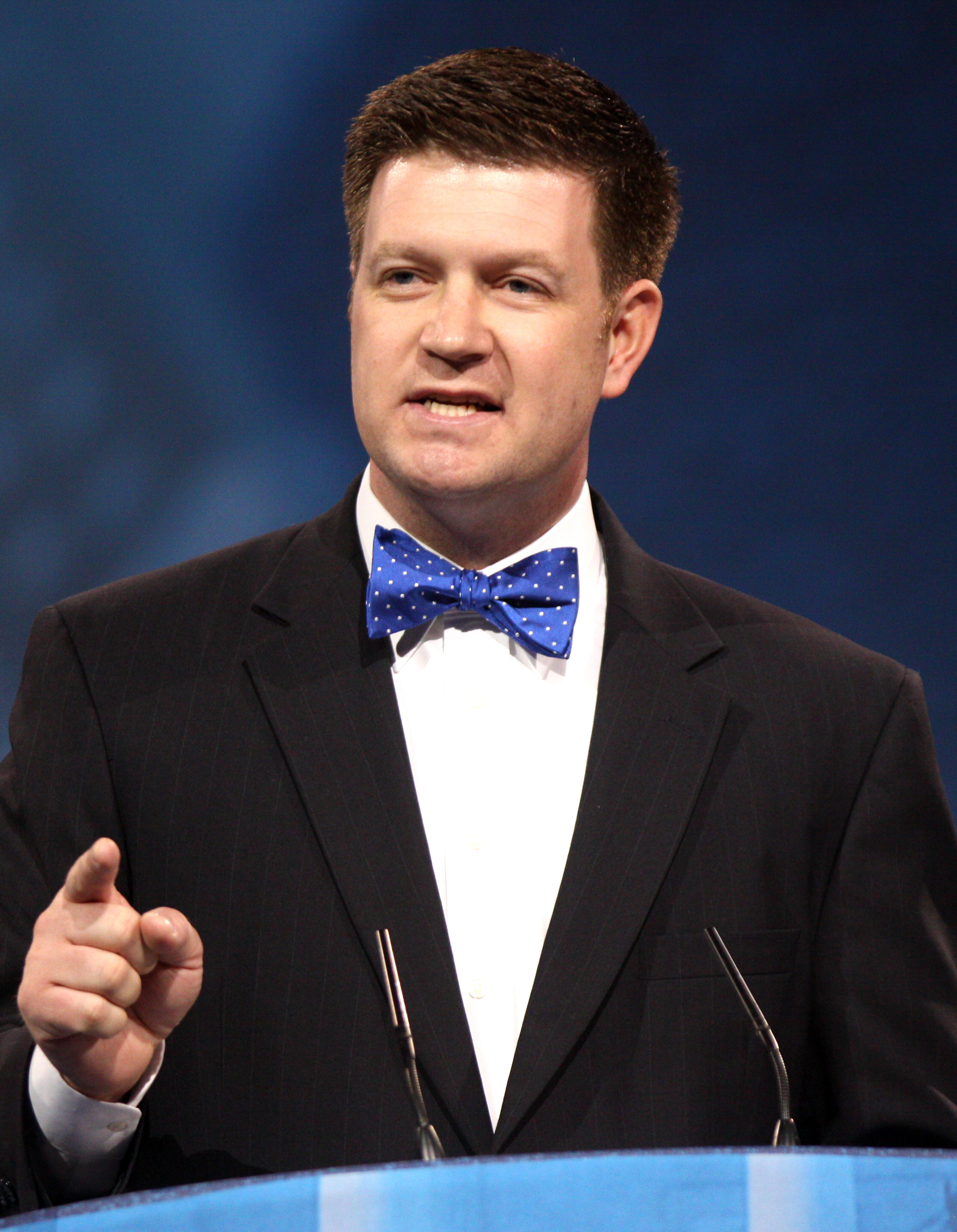

Member of the Nebraska Legislature from the 39th district
- In office January 2009 – January 2017
- Preceded by: Dwite Pedersen
- Succeeded by: Lou Ann Linehan

Personal details
- Born: November 12, 1980 (age 45) Burlington, Colorado, U.S.
- Party: Republican
- Education: Bellevue University (BA)
- Website: Government website

Beau McCoy (born November 12, 1980) is an American politician who served as a member of the Nebraska Legislature for the 39th district from 2009 to 2017.

== Early life and education ==
McCoy was born in Burlington, Colorado, and has been active in the Republican Party since his teens. He earned a Bachelor of Arts degree in leadership, from Bellevue University, where he was the national committeeman for the Nebraska chapter of the Young Republicans.

== Career ==
Prior to entering politics, McCoy worked as a home improvement contractor. He was elected to the Nebraska legislature in 2008 and re-elected in 2012. During his tenure, he served as vice chair of the Banking, Commerce and Insurance Committee and chair of the Committee on Committees. McCoy was also vice chair of the Council of State Governments and chair of the Midwestern Council of State Governments.

McCoy was a Republican candidate in the 2014 Nebraska gubernatorial election, placing third in the Republican primary.

== Positions ==
McCoy identifies himself as pro-life. According to McCoy, he "support[s] our Second Amendment rights", believes in the death penalty, and opposes "in-state tuition benefits for illegal aliens."
