= Dwite Pedersen =

American politician (1941–2021)

Member of the Nebraska Legislature from the 39th district
- In office January 6, 1993 – January 8, 2009
- Preceded by: Ed Schrock
- Succeeded by: Beau McCoy

Personal details
- Born: October 20, 1941 Chamberlain, South Dakota
- Died: March 16, 2021 (aged 79) Omaha, Nebraska
- Party: Republican

Dwite Pedersen (October 20, 1941 – March 16, 2021) was an American politician who served as a Nebraska state senator from Elkhorn, Nebraska in the Nebraska Legislature and a substance abuse counselor.

== Personal life ==
He was born October 20, 1941, in Chamberlain, South Dakota and graduated from Winner High School in 1960. He attended South Dakota State University and South Dakota Southern State Teachers College, and graduated from Doane College in human relations in 1995. He worked with troubled youth for 35 years being a member of the Nebraska and National Associations of Alcoholism and Drug Abuse Counselors and a former Boys Town counselor and administrator. He was a member of the Catholic Church.

He died on March 16, 2021, in Omaha, Nebraska, at age 79.

== State legislature ==
He was elected in 1992 to represent the 39th Nebraska legislative district and re-elected in 1996, 2000, and 2004. He sat on the Transportation and Telecommunications committee, was the vice chairperson of the Judiciary committee, and chaired the Committee on Committees. He was eulogized on the floor of the Legislature by Senator Lou Ann Linehan the day following his death.

== See also ==
- Nebraska Legislature

| Preceded by Ed Schrock | Nebraska state senator-district 39; 1993-2008 | Succeeded by Beau McCoy |
