= Dan Hughes (Nebraska politician) =

American politician (born 1956)

Chair of the Executive Board of the Nebraska Legislature
- In office January 8, 2021 – January 4, 2023
- Preceded by: Mike Hilgers
- Succeeded by: Tom Briese

Member of the Nebraska Legislature from the 44th district
- In office January 7, 2015 – January 4, 2023
- Preceded by: Mark Christensen
- Succeeded by: Teresa Ibach

Personal details
- Born: June 5, 1956 (age 70) Imperial, Nebraska, U.S.
- Party: Republican
- Education: Northeastern Junior College

Dan Hughes (born June 5, 1956) is an American politician from the state of Nebraska in the Midwestern United States. In 2014, he was elected to the Nebraska Legislature, representing a district in the southwestern part of the state. Hughes is a member of the Republican Party.

== Early life and career ==
Hughes was born on June 5, 1956, in Imperial, Nebraska, to a family of farmers. He graduated from high school in Venango, Nebraska, in 1974. In 1976, he received an associate degree in agriculture from Northeastern Junior College in Sterling, Colorado. In 1977, he married Josie Hahn; the couple eventually produced two children.

After receiving his degree, Hughes joined his family's wheat-farming operation in southwestern Nebraska. As of 2011, they farmed about 11,000 acres (4,500 ha).

From 1993 to 1999, Hughes served on the Nebraska Ethanol Board, a state agency created to promote development of the ethanol industry. From 2006 to 2014, he served on the Nebraska Wheat Board, a state agency tasked with promoting the domestic and foreign consumption of wheat and wheat products. In 2012 and 2013, he served as chair of U.S. Wheat Associates, a national organization that promotes export sales of U.S. wheat.

From 1998 to 2010, Hughes was a member of the school board for the city of Grant, Nebraska and, following consolidation, Perkins County.

== Nebraska legislature ==
=== 2014 election ===
In August 2013, Hughes announced that he would seek a seat in the Nebraska Legislature representing the 44th District. The district consisted of ten counties in the southwestern portion of the state—Chase, Dundy, Frontier, Furnas, Gosper, Harlan, Hayes, Hitchcock, Perkins, and Red Willow counties—and included the cities of McCook, Imperial, and Alma. Under Nebraska's term-limits law, the incumbent, Mark Christensen, was ineligible to run for a third consecutive term.

==== 2014 primary ====
Hughes was one of three candidates for the position; all three were members of the Republican Party. Dennis Berry was the mayor of McCook, a position that he had held for ten years; he was about to retire as principal of McCook Junior High. Steve Stroup was a farmer from Benkelman, and operated a small medical-coding business.

The three candidates agreed that water, which the McCook Gazette called "arguably the hottest topic in Southwest Nebraska", and property taxes were among the most salient issues for the 44th District. The candidates emphasized their backgrounds rather than the differences in their political positions. Berry noted his experience as mayor, and said that his background in education would help him in addressing what he suggested was insufficient state funding for schools; he noted that he had grown up doing agricultural work in the Nebraska Panhandle, and said that he had sufficient knowledge of agriculture to represent the district effectively. Hughes called attention to his career as a farmer, and stated that his experience on the school board and in various commodity organizations had given him communication and relationship-building skills that would be useful in the legislature. Stroup also emphasized his farming background, and argued that his experience operating a business would make him an effective legislator.

As of two weeks before the May 13 primary, Hughes had raised the most money for his campaign, with receipts of $29,000. Berry had raised nearly $16,000 by that date, and Stroup almost $7,000.

When the nonpartisan primary election was held, Hughes won a plurality, with 3559 votes, or 40.0% of the total. Stroup came in second, with 3145 votes, or 35.3%; Berry received 2199 votes, or 24.7%. As the top two vote-getters, Hughes and Stroup moved on to the general election.

==== 2014 general election ====
As in the primary election, Hughes and Stroup campaigned largely on their experience and personal qualities rather than on their political differences. Both candidates opposed a proposed increase in the state's minimum wage; both supported the construction of the Keystone XL pipeline through Nebraska; both opposed the proposed expansion of Medicaid under the provisions of the 2010 Affordable Care Act; both opposed the abolition of capital punishment; and both believed that illegal immigration was a problem in Nebraska.

The candidates agreed that property taxes on farms needed to be reduced. Hughes proposed a sales tax on food as a means of making up the revenue lost thereby; Stroup proposed a "transaction tax" which, unlike a property tax, would not have to be paid in years in which a farmer's crop was lost to hail or other disaster. The two also differed on how to fund maintenance and construction of roads and bridges: Stroup supported an increase in the state's fuel tax; Hughes favored policies that he said would lead to economic growth, which in turn would produce higher sales- and income-tax revenues.

Hughes maintained that his twelve years of school-board experience had left him with leadership qualities that would make him a more effective legislator. Stroup cited his 35 years of farming, ranching, and business experience, and declared that he was willing to consider issues on their merits rather than basing his votes chiefly on party positions.

Over the course of the entire campaign, Hughes received contributions of about $70,000, loaned his campaign an additional $17,000, and spent $102,000. Stroup received contributions of $59,000, loaned his campaign $6,100, and spent $67,000. Hughes's receipts included $2,500 from Republican gubernatorial candidate Pete Ricketts; Stroup received $5,800 from WaterClaim, a group of irrigators in the Republican River basin, and $2,000 from Nebraska Colorado Cellular, doing business as Viaero Wireless. Several major contributors provided money to both candidates, among them the Nebraska Realtors PAC, which gave $3,000 to Hughes and $2,500 to Stroup; the Nebraska Bankers PAC, which gave $2,600 to Hughes and $1,000 to Stroup; and the AGC Highway Improvement PAC, which gave Hughes $2,000 and Stroup $500.

When the general election was held, Hughes won 6,924 votes, or 57% of the total; Stroup received 5,189 votes, or 43%.

Nebraska Legislature
Preceded by Mike Hilgers	Chair of the Executive Board of the Nebraska Legislature; 2021–2023	Succeeded by Tom Briese
