= Laird Township, Phelps County, Nebraska =

Laird Township
- Township
- Location in Phelps County
- Coordinates: 40°28′55″N 099°28′28″W
- Country: United States
- State: Nebraska
- County: Phelps

Area
  - Total: 35.78 sq mi (92.68 km^{2})
  - Land: 35.70 sq mi (92.47 km^{2})
  - Water: 0.081 sq mi (0.21 km^{2}) 0.23%
- Elevation: 2,360 ft (720 m)

Population (2000)
  - Total: 561
  - Density: 16/sq mi (6.1/km^{2})
- GNIS feature ID: 0838079

Laird Township is one of fourteen townships in Phelps County, Nebraska, United States. The population was 561 at the 2000 census. A 2006 estimate placed the township's population at 542.

The Village of Loomis lies within the Township.
