= Center Township, Phelps County, Nebraska =

Center Township
- Township
- Location in Phelps County
- Coordinates: 40°34′16″N 099°21′34″W
- Country: United States
- State: Nebraska
- County: Phelps

Area
  - Total: 36.20 sq mi (93.77 km^{2})
  - Land: 36.20 sq mi (93.77 km^{2})
  - Water: 0 sq mi (0 km^{2}) 0%
- Elevation: 2,274 ft (693 m)

Population (2000)
  - Total: 206
  - Density: 5.7/sq mi (2.2/km^{2})
- GNIS feature ID: 0837909

Center Township is one of fourteen townships in Phelps County, Nebraska, United States. The population was 206 at the 2000 census. A 2006 estimate placed the township's population at 207.
