= John O. Almquist =

American scientist

John Olson Almquist (February 10, 1921 - September 6, 2015) was an American scientist who earned his doctoral degree from Penn State College of Agricultural Sciences.

== Early life ==
Almquist was born in Holdrege, Nebraska. During his childhood, Almquist moved with his parents to a farm that is located in Alden, New York. In his early years, Almquist participated in 4-H, and he would later judge cows at county fairs. He had 3 other siblings and was the oldest amongst them all. He later graduated from Alden High School in 1937 and then received a bachelor's degree from Cornell University, as well as a master's degree from Purdue University.

== Career ==
Almquist studied at Penn state at 1944, later establishing the Dairy Breeding Research Center in 1949, which is a faculty served to research on artificial insemination. Almquist pioneered research showing how antibiotics could preserve bull semen by reducing bacterial growth, promote healthy fertility, and lower embryonic loss. He also discovered that milk could be used for bull semen preservation. His research later led to a receipt of the Wolf Prize in 1981, for "early work on the addition of antibiotics to bull semen." Almquist retired in 1982.

== Death ==
Almquist died on September 6, 2015.
