= Tom Vickers =

American politician (1936–2026)

Member of the Nebraska Legislature from the 38th district
- In office January 3, 1979 – January 7, 1987
- Preceded by: Richard Lewis
- Succeeded by: Owen Elmer

Personal details
- Born: March 7, 1936 Gothenburg, Nebraska, U.S.
- Died: February 20, 2026 (aged 89) McCook, Nebraska, U.S.
- Party: Republican (until 1983); Democratic (1983–2026)
- Spouses: Shirley Messersmith (m. 1956; died 2009); Jerda Garey (m. 2011)
- Children: 3 (Matt, Mark, Cindy)
- Occupation: Stockman-farmer

Geno Thomas Vickers (March 7, 1936 – February 20, 2026) was an American Democratic politician from Nebraska, who served as a member of the Nebraska Legislature from the 38th district from 1979 to 1987. He was the Democratic nominee for U.S. Congress in the 3rd district in 1984, and lost to Republican Congresswoman Virginia Smith.

== Early career ==
Vickers was born in Gothenburg, Nebraska, and was a farmer and rancher in Farnam. He was a director of the McCook Public Power District and was the president of the Farmers Co-op Association of Farnam.

== Nebraska Legislature ==
In 1978, State Senator Richard Lewis declined to seek re-election to a third term. Vickers ran to succeed him in the 38th district, which included Frontier, Furnas, Garfield, Harlan, Hayes, and Red Willow counties. In the nonpartisan primary, Vickers faced former State Senator Lester Harsh, railroad engineer Ronald Leitner, and farmers Phillys Person Lyons and Randall Salisbury. Harsh placed first in the primary, winning 33 percent of the vote, and Vickers placed second with 20 percent. They advanced to the general election, where Harsh was considered the "heavy favorite." However, Vickers ultimately defeated Harsh, winning his first term with 55 percent of the vote.

Vickers ran for re-election in 1982, and was challenged by Lyons, one of his 1978 opponents, and Lesley Rice, a businessman and conservative activist. In the primary election, Vickers placed first by a wide margin, winning 73 percent of the vote to Lyons's 17 percent and Rice's 10 percent. He ultimately won re-election in a landslide, defeating Lyons, 75–25 percent.

In 1983, Vickers announced that he was switching his party affiliation from Republican to Democratic, citing the change in the Republican Party's ideology and the greater willingness of the Democratic party to accept his independent views. He subsequently announced that he would challenge Republican Congresswoman Virginia D. Smith for re-election in 1984. He won the Democratic primary unopposed, but was ultimately defeated by Smith in a landslide, winning 17 percent of the vote to her 83 percent.

Vickers ran for re-election to a third term in the legislature in 1986. He was challenged in the primary by businessman Owen Elmer and veterinarian Joe Jeffrey, both of whom attacked him for being ideologically out of step with the "conservative" district. In the primary, Vickers placed first with 42 percent of the vote, and advanced to the general election with Elmer, who placed second with 37 percent. Elmer defeated Vickers by a wide margin, receiving 60 percent of the vote to Vickers's 40 percent.

== Death ==
Vickers died in McCook, Nebraska on February 20, 2026, at the age of 89.
