= Williamsburg Township, Phelps County, Nebraska =

Williamsburg Township
- Township
- Location in Phelps County
- Coordinates: 40°38′37″N 99°27′30″W
- Country: United States
- State: Nebraska
- County: Phelps

Area
  - Total: 33.29 sq mi (86.21 km^{2})
  - Land: 33.22 sq mi (86.05 km^{2})
  - Water: 0.062 sq mi (0.16 km^{2}) 0.19%
- Elevation: 2,303 ft (702 m)

Population (2000)
  - Total: 194
  - Density: 6.0/sq mi (2.3/km^{2})
- GNIS feature ID: 0838331

Williamsburg Township is one of fourteen townships in Phelps County, Nebraska, United States. The population was 153 at the 2010 Decennial Census.A 2006 estimate placed the township's population at 196.

Williamsburg Township was named for William Dilworth, grandson of Phelps County namesake William Phelps.

== Statistics ==
According to the American Community Survey 5-Year Estimates the Median Income of a Household in the Williamsburg Township was at $44,167 in 2011. The same survey estimates there were about 54 households across 58 units of housing. The employment rate was at 82.9% and 21.7% of Williamsburgs population had an education up to a Bachelor's degree or higher.
