= Westside Township, Phelps County, Nebraska =

Westside Township
- Township
- Location in Phelps County
- Coordinates: 40°38′33″N 099°35′19″W
- Country: United States
- State: Nebraska
- County: Phelps

Area
  - Total: 28.41 sq mi (73.58 km^{2})
  - Land: 28.01 sq mi (72.54 km^{2})
  - Water: 0.40 sq mi (1.03 km^{2}) 1.4%
- Elevation: 2,405 ft (733 m)

Population (2000)
  - Total: 155
  - Density: 5.4/sq mi (2.1/km^{2})
- GNIS feature ID: 0838329

Westside Township is one of fourteen townships in Phelps County, Nebraska, United States. The population was 155 at the 2000 census. A 2006 estimate placed the township's population at 156.
