= Mark R. Christensen =

American politician (born 1962)

Member of the Nebraska Legislature from the 44th district
- In office 2007–2015
- Preceded by: Tom Baker
- Succeeded by: Dan Hughes

Personal details
- Born: July 1, 1962 (age 64) Holdrege, Nebraska
- Party: Republican

Mark R. Christensen (born July 1, 1962, in Holdrege, Nebraska) is a politician from the U.S. state of Nebraska. He was a member of the Nebraska Legislature from 2007 to 2015.

Christensen graduated from Arapahoe High School in 1980. He then earned a BS in Agricultural Economics from the University of Nebraska–Lincoln in 1984. He is married and has seven children. He is a commodities broker and land manager.

In the 2006 election, Christensen defeated Frank Shoemaker for a seat in the Nebraska Legislature, representing the 44th Nebraska legislative district in the southwestern part of the state. In 2010, he defeated Tom Baker, who had occupied the seat in the legislature from 1999 to 2007, to win a second term. Nebraska's term-limits law precluded his running for a third consecutive term in 2014, and he was succeeded by Dan Hughes.

In the legislature, Christensen sat on the Banking, Commerce, and Insurance committee; the Judiciary committee; and the Executive Board of the Legislative Council.
