= Westmark Township, Phelps County, Nebraska =

Westmark Township
- Township
- Location in Phelps County
- Coordinates: 40°34′08″N 099°28′25″W
- Country: United States
- State: Nebraska
- County: Phelps

Area
  - Total: 35.98 sq mi (93.18 km^{2})
  - Land: 35.98 sq mi (93.18 km^{2})
  - Water: 0 sq mi (0 km^{2}) 0%
- Elevation: 2,352 ft (717 m)

Population (2000)
  - Total: 199
  - Density: 5.4/sq mi (2.1/km^{2})
- GNIS feature ID: 0838326

Westmark Township is one of fourteen townships in Phelps County, Nebraska, United States. The population was 199 at the 2000 census. A 2006 estimate placed the township's population at 201.
