= Prairie Township, Phelps County, Nebraska =

Prairie Township
- Township
- Location in Phelps County
- Coordinates: 40°23′33″N 099°21′38″W
- Country: United States
- State: Nebraska
- County: Phelps

Area
  - Total: 34.53 sq mi (89.43 km^{2})
  - Land: 34.53 sq mi (89.43 km^{2})
  - Water: 0 sq mi (0 km^{2}) 0%
- Elevation: 2,320 ft (707 m)

Population (2000)
  - Total: 387
  - Density: 11/sq mi (4.3/km^{2})
- GNIS feature ID: 0838197

Prairie Township is one of fourteen townships in Phelps County, Nebraska, United States. The population was 387 at the 2000 census. A 2006 estimate placed the township's population at 388.
