= Kinner House =

- U.S. National Register of Historic Places
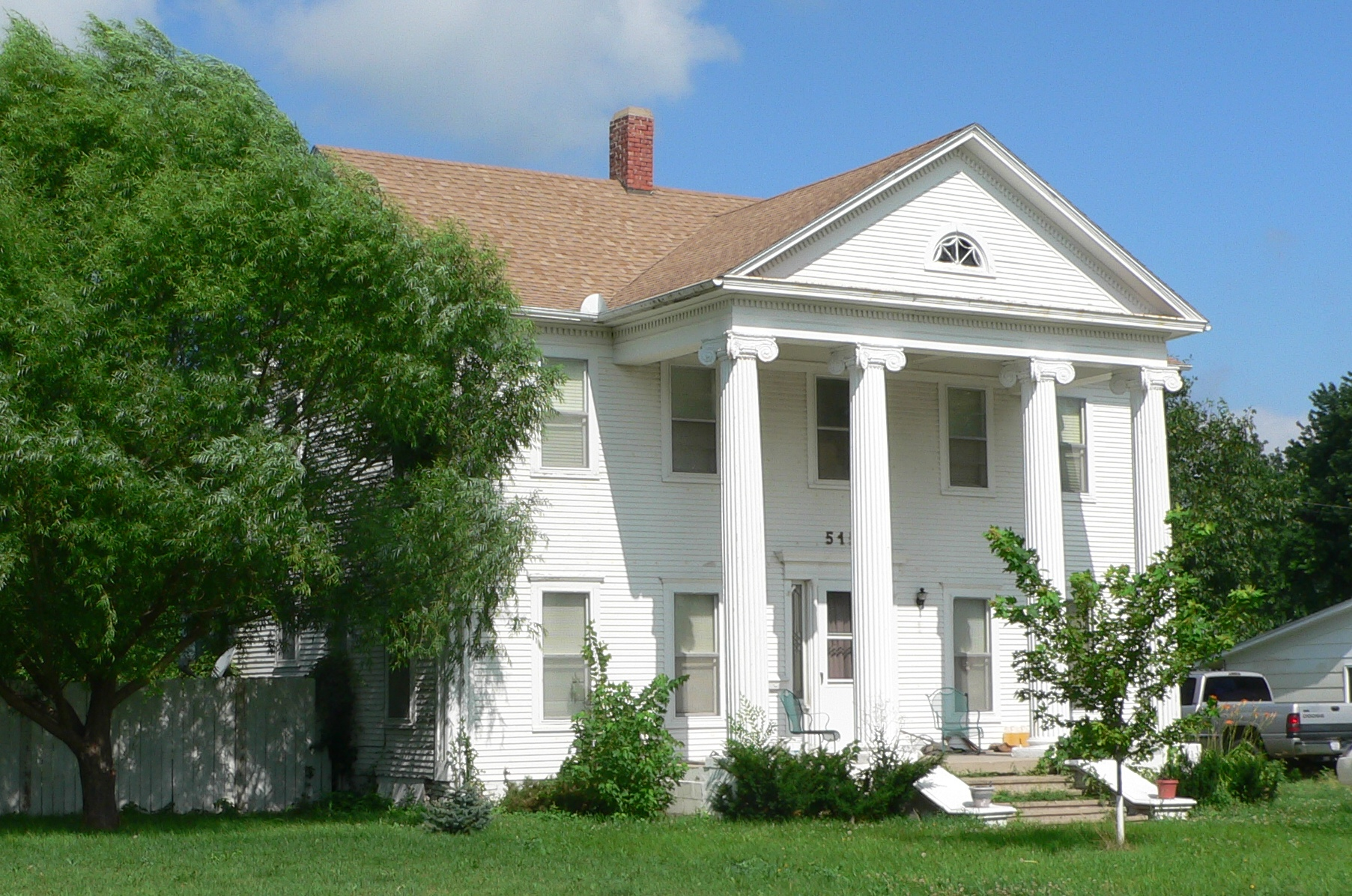
- The house in 2010

- Location within Nebraska Location within the United States
- Location: 515 Tibbals, Holdrege, Nebraska
- Coordinates: 40°26′23″N 99°22′56″W
- Area: less than one acre
- Built: 1903
- Architectural style: Classical Revival
- NRHP reference No.: 04000294
- Added to NRHP: April 14, 2004

The Kinner House is a historic house in Holdrege, Nebraska. It was built in 1903 for the Tibbals family, including Francis M. Kinner who was married to one of the Kibbals' daughters, and was designed in the Classical Revival style, with "ionic columns, decorative door surround and the symmetrical facade." It has been listed on the National Register of Historic Places since April 14, 2004.
