= Ed Schrock (Nebraska politician) =

American politician (born 1943)

Member of the Nebraska Legislature from the 38th district
- In office 1995–2007
- Preceded by: Owen Elmer
- Succeeded by: Tom Carlson

Member of the Nebraska Legislature from the 39th district
- In office 1990–1993
- Preceded by: William E. Barrett
- Succeeded by: Dwite Pedersen

Personal details
- Born: August 20, 1943 (age 83) Holdrege, Nebraska, U.S.

Ed Schrock (born 1943) is a former Nebraska state senator from Elm Creek, Nebraska, United States in the Nebraska Legislature and farmer.

== Personal life ==
Schrock was born on August 20, 1943, in Holdrege, Nebraska, and graduated from Holdrege High School in 1961 and Nebraska Wesleyan University with a B.A. in business administration in 1965. He was a member of the U.S. National Guard from 1966 to 1972. He is a former member of Nebraska corn based organizations, and current member of both Holdrege and Superior chamber of commerce, farm based organizations and Holdrege United Methodist Church.

== State legislature ==
Schrock was appointed to the legislature on Dec. 31, 1990 to represent the 39th Nebraska legislative district to replace William E. Barrett who was elected to Congress. He left office in 1993 because of redistricting and was then elected to the in 1994 to represent the 38th Nebraska legislative district. He was reelected in 1998 and 2002. He sat on the Education committee, the Committee on Committees and was the chairperson of the Natural Resources committee. Because Nebraska voters passed Initiative Measure 415 in 2001 limiting state senators to two terms after 2001, he was unable to run for reelection.

== See also ==
- Nebraska Legislature

Preceded by William E. Barrett	Nebraska state senator – district 39; 1990–1993	Succeeded by Dwite Pedersen
Preceded by W. Owen Elmer	Nebraska state senator – district 38; 1995–2007	Succeeded by Tom Carlson
