= Owen Elmer =

American politician (1938–2023)

W. Owen Elmer

Member of the Nebraska Legislature
- In office January 7, 1987 – January 6, 1999
- Preceded by: Tom Vickers
- Succeeded by: Tom Baker
- Constituency: 38th district (1987–1995); 44th district (1995–1999)

Personal details
- Born: June 13, 1938 McCook, Nebraska
- Died: May 10, 2023 (aged 84) Kearney, Nebraska
- Party: Republican
- Spouse: Donna J. Hoyt (m. 1959)
- Children: 4 (Crinda, Sharma, Lewis, Jeana)
- Education: University of Nebraska–Lincoln
- Occupation: Agribusinessman

Willard Owen Elmer (June 13, 1938 – May 10, 2023) was a Republican politician from Nebraska who served as a member of the Nebraska Legislature from 1987 to 1999.

== Early life ==
Elmer was born in McCook, Nebraska, in 1938, and graduated from Indianola High School. He later attended the University of Nebraska, and worked at the Indianola Oil Company, his family's business. Elmer served on the Indianola City Council.

== Nebraska Legislature ==
In 1986, Elmer ran against State Senator Tom Vickers, who was seeking re-election to a third term in the 36th district, which included Frontier, Furnas, Gosper, Harlan, Lincoln, and Red Willow counties. Elmer attacked Vickers, who had switched to the Democratic Party, for being ideologically out of step with the district. In the primary election, Elmer placed second, winning 37 percent of the vote to Vickers's 42 percent, and they advanced to the general election. In the general election, Elmer defeated Vickers by a wide margin, winning 60–40 percent.

Elmer ran for re-election in 1990, and was re-elected unopposed.

In 1994, after redistricting took place, Elmer ran for re-election to a third term from the 44th district. He was challenged by Barry Fay Richards and Steven Smith, both of whom were farmers. In the primary election, Elmer placed first, winning 49 percent to Richards's 26 percent and Smith's 25 percent. Elmer ultimately defeated Richards, winning 57–43 percent.

Elmer declined to seek re-election to a fourth term in 1998.

== Death ==
Elmer died on May 10, 2023.
