= Tom Baker (Nebraska politician) =

American politician (born 1948)

Thomas C. Baker (born 1948) is a politician from the U.S. state of Nebraska. He served two terms in the Nebraska Legislature from 1999 to 2007.

Baker was born on August 24, 1948, in McCook, Nebraska. He graduated from Trenton High School in 1966, and from the University of Nebraska–Lincoln in 1971 with a B.S. in agronomy with a secondary teaching certificate in science.

In the 1998 election, he defeated Steven D. Smith for the seat in the legislature vacated by Owen Elmer, representing the 44th Nebraska legislative district. In 2002, he ran unopposed for re-election. Nebraska's term-limits law prevented his running for a third consecutive term in 2006, and he was replaced by Mark Christensen. In 2007, he was appointed by governor Dave Heineman to the state Board of Educational Lands and Funds. He resigned from the Board in 2009 to run for his old seat in the legislature, but lost to Christensen in the 2010 election.

In the legislature, Baker sat on the Revenue and Rules committees and was chairperson of the Transportation and Telecommunications Committee.

Baker has partial ownership in Trenton Agri Products, a fuel ethanol plant located 3 miles east of Trenton along Highway 34.

Baker has a wife, Pat. He also owns and runs Trails West gas station and convenience store in Trenton, Nebraska.
