= Barbara Granlund =

American politician (1928–2020)

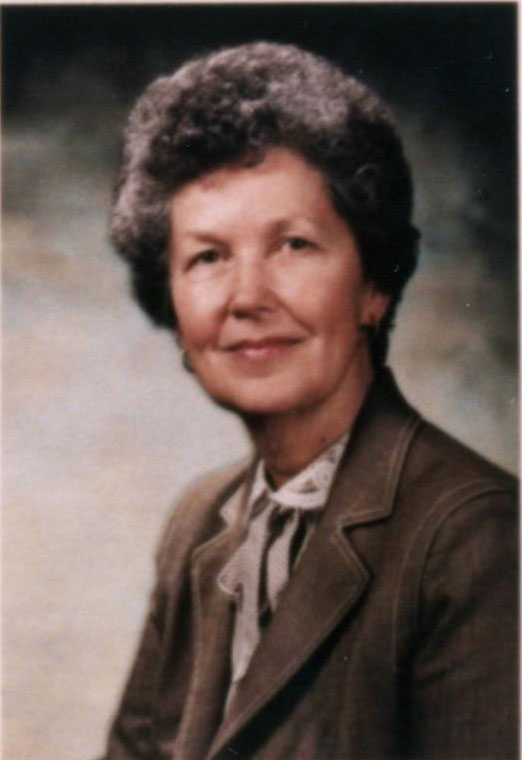
- Granlund in 1983

Member of the Washington State Senate from the 26th district
- In office January 10, 1983 – September 1, 1985
- Preceded by: Art Gallaghan
- Succeeded by: Win Granlund

Member of the Washington House of Representatives from the 26th district
- In office January 8, 1979 – January 10, 1983
- Succeeded by: Carolyn Powers

Personal details
- Born: July 7, 1928 Holdrege, Nebraska, United States
- Died: November 14, 2020 (aged 92) Tacoma, Washington
- Party: Democratic

Barbara A. Granlund (July 7, 1928 – November 14, 2020) was an American politician in the state of Washington. Granlund served in the Washington House of Representatives from 1979 to 1983 and in the Washington State Senate from 1983 to 1985 as a Democrat from the 27th District.

Granlund died on November 14, 2020, in Tacoma, Washington at age 92.
