= Farnam, Nebraska =

- Village
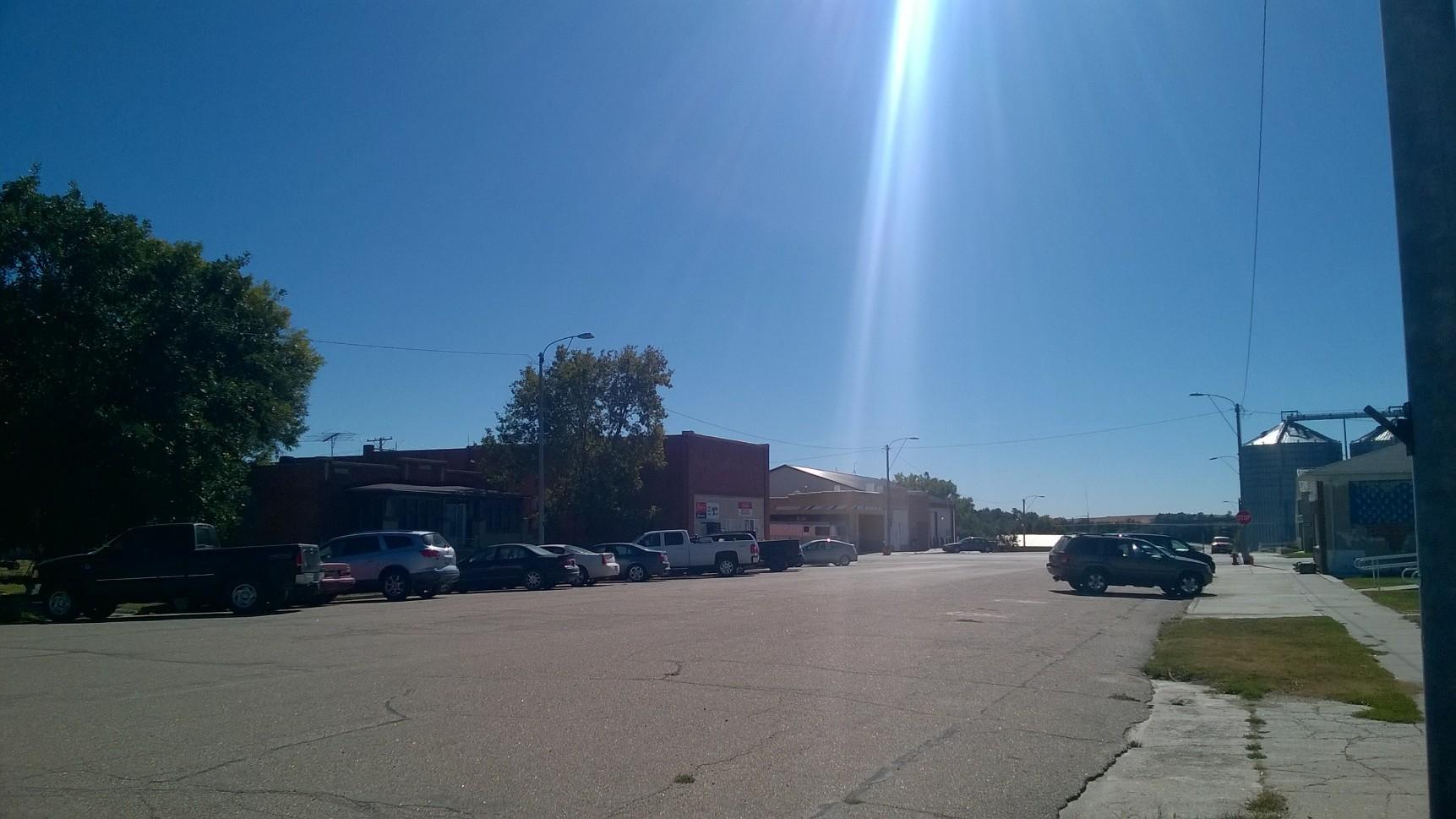
- Main Street Farnam, Nebraska

- Location of Farnam, Nebraska
- Coordinates: 40°42′23″N 100°12′56″W
- Country: United States
- State: Nebraska
- County: Dawson

Area
  - Total: 0.67 sq mi (1.74 km^{2})
  - Land: 0.67 sq mi (1.74 km^{2})
  - Water: 0 sq mi (0.00 km^{2})
- Elevation: 2,759 ft (841 m)

Population (2020)
  - Total: 182
  - Density: 270.4/sq mi (104.41/km^{2})
- Time zone: UTC-6 (Central (CST))
  - Summer (DST): UTC-5 (CDT)
- ZIP code: 69029
- Area code: 308
- FIPS code: 31-16725
- GNIS feature ID: 2398864
- Website: farnamne.com

Farnam is a village in Dawson County, Nebraska, United States. It is part of the Lexington, Nebraska Micropolitan Statistical Area. As of the 2020 census, Farnam had a population of 182.

== History ==
Farnam was founded in 1886 when the Burlington and Missouri River Railroad was extended to that point. It was named for Henry Farnam, a railroad official.

== Geography ==
According to the United States Census Bureau, the village has a total area of 0.67 square miles (1.74 km^{2}), all land.

== Demographics ==
Historical population
Census	Pop.	Note	%±
1900	218		—
1910	462		111.9%
1920	408		−11.7%
1930	394		−3.4%
1940	346		−12.2%
1950	323		−6.6%
1960	258		−20.1%
1970	270		4.7%
1980	268		−0.7%
1990	188		−29.9%
2000	223		18.6%
2010	171		−23.3%
2020	182		6.4%
U.S. Decennial Census

=== 2010 census ===
As of the census of 2010, there were 171 people, 74 households, and 48 families residing in the village. The population density was 255.2 inhabitants per square mile (98.5/km^{2}). There were 100 housing units at an average density of 149.3 per square mile (57.6/km^{2}). The racial makeup of the village was 91.8% White, 0.6% Native American, 3.5% Pacific Islander, 2.9% from other races, and 1.2% from two or more races. Hispanic or Latino of any race were 8.8% of the population.

There were 74 households, of which 24.3% had children under the age of 18 living with them, 55.4% were married couples living together, 8.1% had a female householder with no husband present, 1.4% had a male householder with no wife present, and 35.1% were non-families. 29.7% of all households were made up of individuals, and 13.5% had someone living alone who was 65 years of age or older. The average household size was 2.31 and the average family size was 2.81.

The median age in the village was 46.8 years. 22.8% of residents were under the age of 18; 7.6% were between the ages of 18 and 24; 15.8% were from 25 to 44; 31.6% were from 45 to 64; and 22.2% were 65 years of age or older. The gender makeup of the village was 47.4% male and 52.6% female.

=== 2000 census ===
As of the census of 2000, there were 223 people, 95 households, and 64 families residing in the village. The population density was 332.0 inhabitants per square mile (128.2/km^{2}). There were 107 housing units at an average density of 159.3 per square mile (61.5/km^{2}). The racial makeup of the village was 97.31% White, 0.45% Native American, and 2.24% from two or more races. Hispanic or Latino of any race were 0.45% of the population.

There were 95 households, out of which 30.5% had children under the age of 18 living with them, 56.8% were married couples living together, 8.4% had a female householder with no husband present, and 32.6% were non-families. 31.6% of all households were made up of individuals, and 18.9% had someone living alone who was 65 years of age or older. The average household size was 2.35 and the average family size was 2.94.

In the village, the population was spread out, with 28.3% under the age of 18, 4.0% from 18 to 24, 22.0% from 25 to 44, 26.9% from 45 to 64, and 18.8% who were 65 years of age or older. The median age was 40 years. For every 100 females, there were 99.1 males. For every 100 females age 18 and over, there were 88.2 males.

As of 2000 the median income for a household in the village was $24,327, and the median income for a family was $30,455. Males had a median income of $23,438 versus $22,188 for females. The per capita income for the village was $11,959. About 9.4% of families and 9.4% of the population were below the poverty line, including none of those under the age of eighteen and 19.2% of those 65 or over.

== Education ==
It is in the Eustis-Farnam Public Schools school district.
