= Bertrand, Nebraska =

- Village
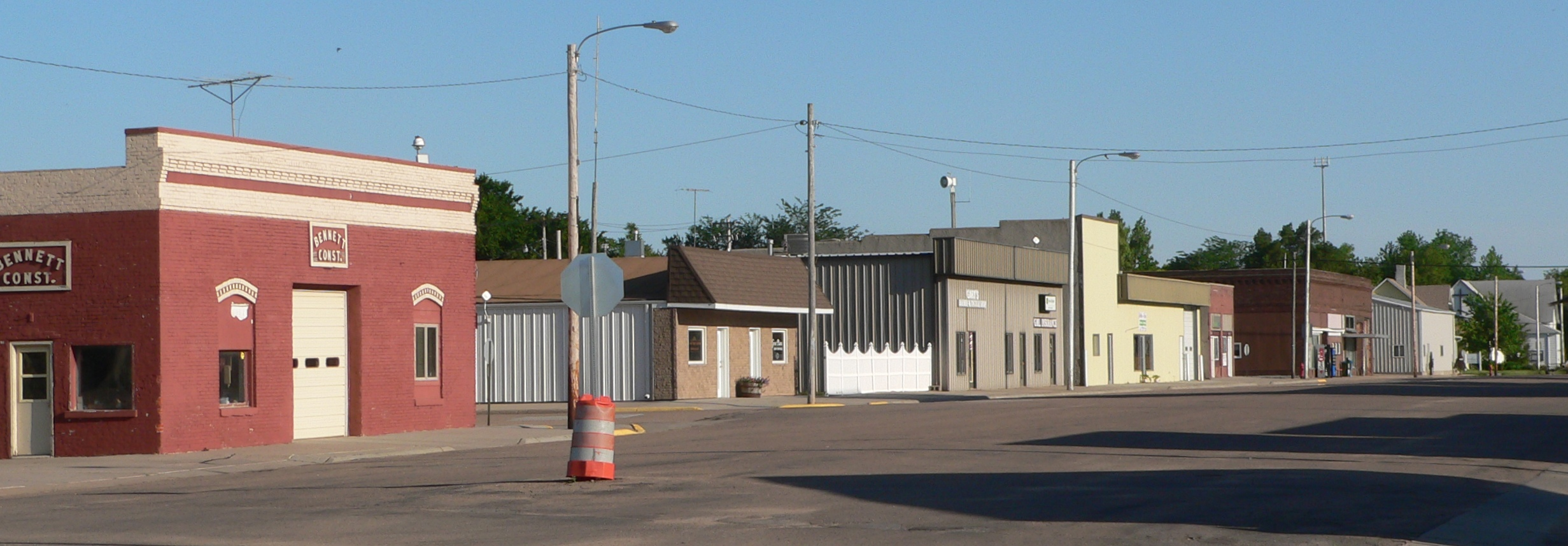
- Downtown Bertrand: east side of Minor Avenue

- Location of Bertrand, Nebraska
- Coordinates: 40°31′35″N 99°37′57″W
- Country: United States
- State: Nebraska
- County: Phelps

Area
  - Total: 0.56 sq mi (1.44 km^{2})
  - Land: 0.56 sq mi (1.44 km^{2})
  - Water: 0 sq mi (0.00 km^{2})
- Elevation: 2,520 ft (770 m)

Population (2020)
  - Total: 709
  - Density: 1,279.0/sq mi (493.82/km^{2})
- Time zone: UTC-6 (Central (CST))
  - Summer (DST): UTC-5 (CDT)
- ZIP code: 68927
- Area code: 308
- FIPS code: 31-04615
- GNIS feature ID: 2398106
- Website: www.bertrandne.gov

Bertrand is a village in Phelps County, Nebraska, United States. As of the 2020 census, Bertrand had a population of 709.

== History ==
Bertrand was established in 1884 when the railroad was extended to that point. It was named for a railroad official. Bertrand was incorporated as a village in 1885.

== Geography ==
According to the United States Census Bureau, the village has a total area of 0.55 square miles (1.42 km^{2}), all land.

=== Climate ===
Climate data for Bertrand, Nebraska (coordinates:40.5283°N 99.6353°W, 1991-2020)
Month	Jan	Feb	Mar	Apr	May	Jun	Jul	Aug	Sep	Oct	Nov	Dec	Year
Average precipitation inches (mm)	0.36 (9.1)	0.60 (15)	1.17 (30)	2.24 (57)	3.77 (96)	3.77 (96)	3.56 (90)	3.20 (81)	1.92 (49)	1.83 (46)	0.98 (25)	0.83 (21)	24.23 (615.1)
Average snowfall inches (cm)	4.2 (11)	5.9 (15)	2.7 (6.9)	0.1 (0.25)	0.0 (0.0)	0.0 (0.0)	0.0 (0.0)	0.0 (0.0)	0.0 (0.0)	0.3 (0.76)	1.8 (4.6)	2.1 (5.3)	17.1 (43.81)
Average extreme snow depth inches (cm)	4 (10)	5 (13)	3 (7.6)	1 (2.5)	0 (0)	0 (0)	0 (0)	0 (0)	0 (0)	1 (2.5)	2 (5.1)	4 (10)	5 (13)
Average precipitation days (≥ 0.01 in)	2.3	3.4	4	5.6	7.8	7.7	6.4	6.4	4.3	4.4	2.9	2.4	57.6
Average snowy days (≥ 0.01 in)	1.5	1.8	0.8	0.1	0	0	0	0	0	0.3	0.7	0.8	6
Source: NOAA

== Demographics ==
Historical population
Census	Pop.	Note	%±
1890	265		—
1900	344		29.8%
1910	643		86.9%
1920	697		8.4%
1930	645		−7.5%
1940	615		−4.7%
1950	584		−5.0%
1960	691		18.3%
1970	662		−4.2%
1980	775		17.1%
1990	708		−8.6%
2000	786		11.0%
2010	750		−4.6%
2020	709		−5.5%
U.S. Decennial Census

=== 2010 census ===
As of the census of 2010, there were 750 people, 314 households, and 203 families residing in the village. The population density was 1,363.6 inhabitants per square mile (526.5/km^{2}). There were 347 housing units at an average density of 630.9 per square mile (243.6/km^{2}). The racial makeup of the village was 97.7% White, 0.5% Native American, 0.4% Asian, 0.3% from other races, and 1.1% from two or more races. Hispanic or Latino of any race were 2.9% of the population.

There were 314 households, of which 28.7% had children under the age of 18 living with them, 58.0% were married couples living together, 4.8% had a female householder with no husband present, 1.9% had a male householder with no wife present, and 35.4% were non-families. 33.1% of all households were made up of individuals, and 19.8% had someone living alone who was 65 years of age or older. The average household size was 2.32 and the average family size was 2.98.

The median age in the village was 46.9 years. 24.8% of residents were under the age of 18; 3.7% were between the ages of 18 and 24; 18.1% were from 25 to 44; 31.5% were from 45 to 64; and 21.9% were 65 years of age or older. The gender makeup of the village was 49.5% male and 50.5% female.

=== 2000 census ===
As of the census of 2000, there were 786 people, 307 households, and 201 families residing in the village. The population density was 1,391.7 inhabitants per square mile (537.3/km^{2}). There were 334 housing units at an average density of 591.4 per square mile (228.3/km^{2}). The racial makeup of the village was 98.85% White, 0.13% African American, 0.38% Native American, 0.25% Asian, 0.38% from other races. Hispanic or Latino of any race were 0.76% of the population.

There were 307 households, out of which 33.2% had children under the age of 18 living with them, 58.3% were married couples living together, 4.2% had a female householder with no husband present, and 34.5% were non-families. 30.3% of all households were made up of individuals, and 19.2% had someone living alone who was 65 years of age or older. The average household size was 2.45 and the average family size was 3.07.

In the village, the population was spread out, with 25.3% under the age of 18, 5.6% from 18 to 24, 24.4% from 25 to 44, 22.9% from 45 to 64, and 21.8% who were 65 years of age or older. The median age was 42 years. For every 100 females, there were 98.5 males. For every 100 females age 18 and over, there were 92.5 males.

As of 2000 the median income for a household in the village was $34,167, and the median income for a family was $44,205. Males had a median income of $28,646 versus $22,083 for females. The per capita income for the village was $16,933. About 2.0% of families and 3.9% of the population were below the poverty line, including none of those under age 18 and 13.0% of those age 65 or over.

== Notable person ==
- Charles L. Littel, educator who founded several colleges
- Ben H. Williams, American labor leader known for his work in the Industrial Workers of the World and as editor of Solidarity.
- Karen Dahlgren Schonewise, Pioneer in the sport of volleyball, with collegiate and professional achievements as a player and coach.
