= Tom Carlson =

American politician (born 1941)

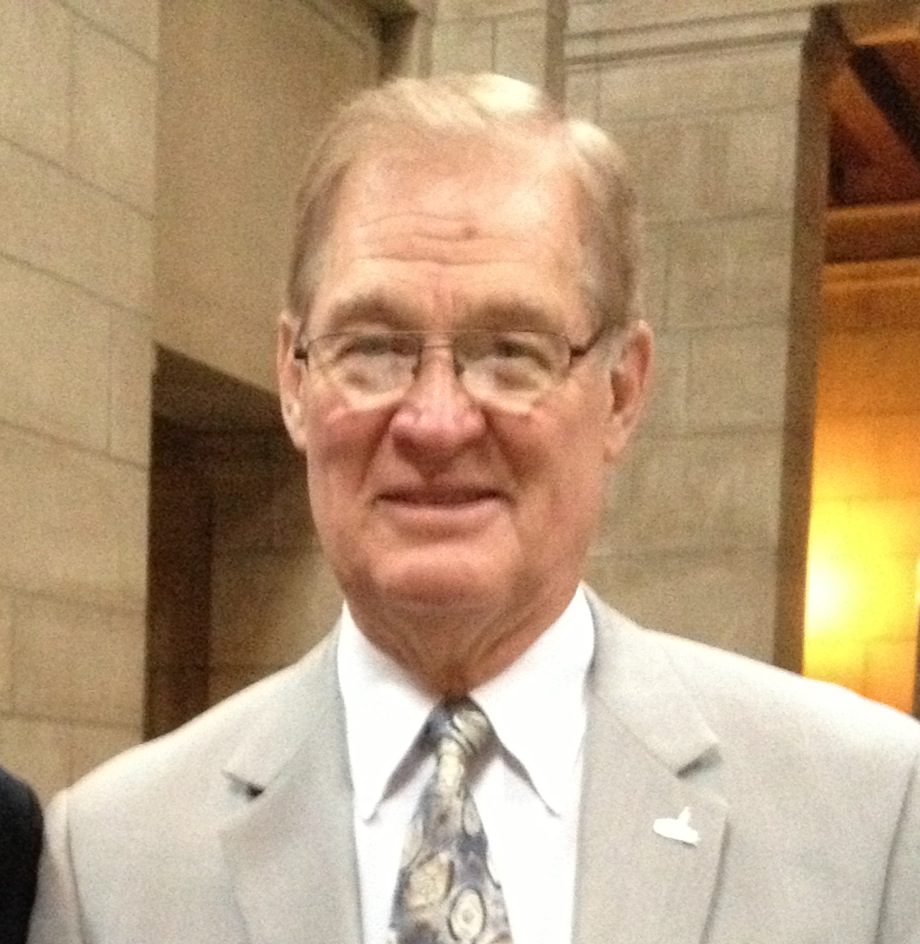

Member of the Nebraska Legislature from the 38th district
- In office January 2007 – January 2015
- Preceded by: Ed Schrock
- Succeeded by: John Kuehn

Personal details
- Born: December 9, 1941 (age 84) Holdrege, Nebraska, U.S.
- Party: Republican
- Education: University of Northern Colorado; University of Iowa

Tom Carlson (born December 9, 1941) is a politician in the U.S. state of Nebraska. He served in the Nebraska Legislature from 2007 to 2015. In 2014, he ran in the Nebraska gubernatorial election, but was defeated by Pete Ricketts in the Republican primary.

== Personal life ==
Tom Carlson was born on December 9, 1941, in Holdrege, Nebraska. He attended the University of Northern Colorado playing football, baseball, and basketball, distinguishing himself as a talented athlete and student, earning a Bachelor of Science in 1963 and a Master of Science in 1964. He received a Ph.D. from the University of Iowa in 1967.

Carlson taught at Taylor University, where he also coached baseball and football prior to returning to Holdrege, Nebraska, where he works as a financial advisor.

He is married and has three children and 4 grandchildren. Before being elected to the State Legislature, Carlson served on the Holdrege Public School Board for eight years.

== State legislature ==
Carlson was elected in 2006 to represent the 38th Nebraska legislative district with 54 percent of the vote. In 2010, Carlson run unopposed and was elected to a second consecutive term. Due to term limits, he was ineligible to run for a third consecutive term in 2014.

In the legislature, Carlson served as the chair of the Natural Resources Committee. He also sat on the Banking, Commerce and Insurance Committee and the Committee on Committees.

== Head coaching record ==
=== Football ===
Year	Team	Overall	Conference	Standing	Bowl/playoffs
Taylor Trojans (Hoosier–Buckeye Conference) (1974–1976)
1974	Taylor	4–4–1	3–3–1	5th	
1975	Taylor	6–3	5–3	4th	
1976	Taylor	5–4	4–4	T–5th	
Taylor:		15–11–1	12–10–1		
Total:		15–11–1			
