= Loomis, Nebraska =

- Village
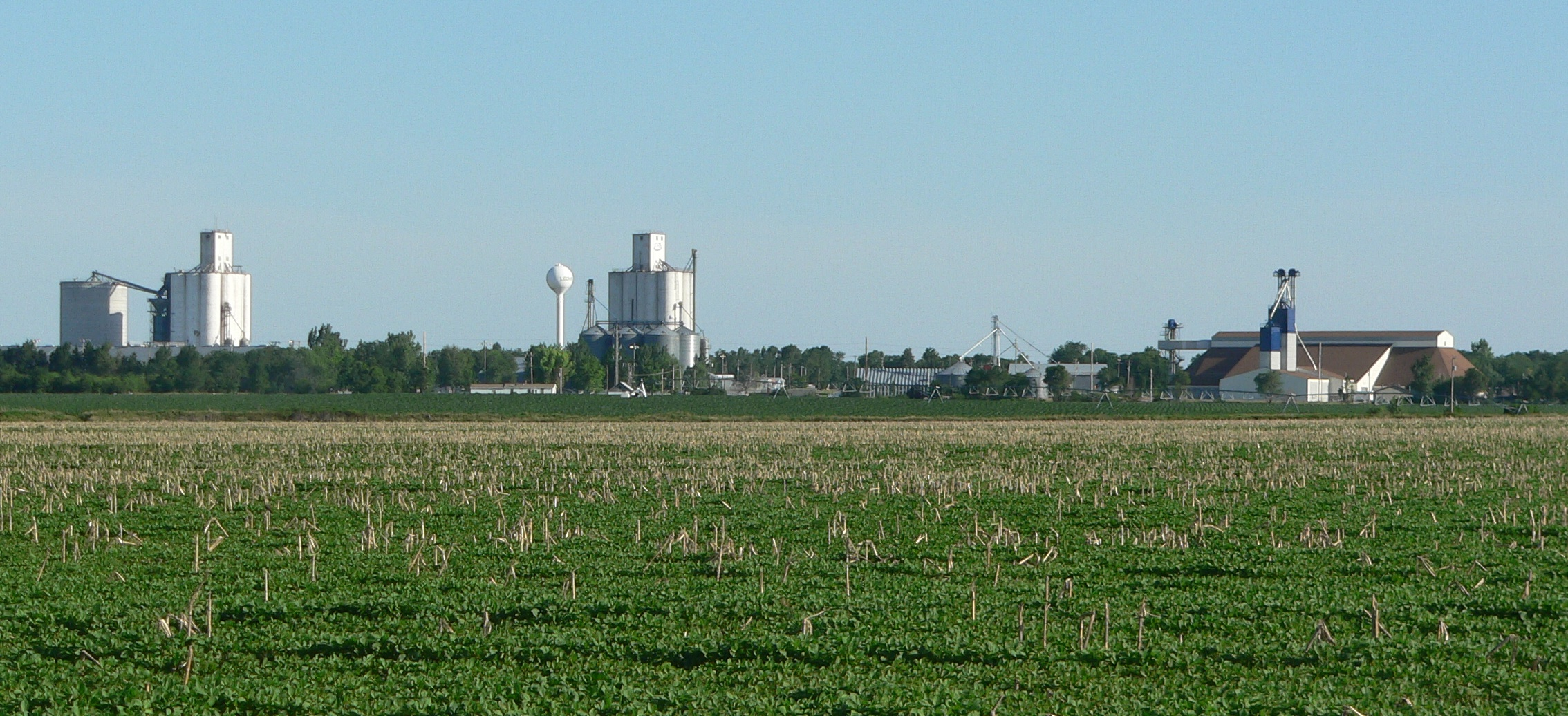
- Loomis, seen from the north

- Location of Loomis, Nebraska
- Coordinates: 40°28′38″N 99°30′28″W
- Country: United States
- State: Nebraska
- County: Phelps

Area
  - Total: 0.33 sq mi (0.85 km^{2})
  - Land: 0.33 sq mi (0.85 km^{2})
  - Water: 0 sq mi (0.00 km^{2})
- Elevation: 2,425 ft (739 m)

Population (2020)
  - Total: 420
  - Density: 1,186.9/sq mi (458.27/km^{2})
- Time zone: UTC-6 (Central (CST))
  - Summer (DST): UTC-5 (CDT)
- ZIP code: 68958
- Area code: 308
- FIPS code: 31-29085
- GNIS feature ID: 2398474
- Website: loomisne.com

Loomis is a village in Phelps County, Nebraska, United States. As of the 2020 census, Loomis had a population of 391.

== History ==
Loomis was organized in 1885. In 1886, Loomis was officially named, and a post office, bank, school, and church were built. It was named for Nelson Henry Loomis, a railroad official. The majority of early settlers were immigrants from Sweden and arrived to the area from 1876-80. On November 20, 1914, there was a large fire in Loomis and nine businesses were burnt to the ground.

== Geography ==
According to the United States Census Bureau, the village has a total area of 0.33 square miles (0.85 km^{2}), all land.

== Demographics ==
Historical population
Census	Pop.	Note	%±
1910	284		—
1920	238		−16.2%
1930	213		−10.5%
1940	249		16.9%
1950	218		−12.4%
1960	299		37.2%
1970	323		8.0%
1980	447		38.4%
1990	376		−15.9%
2000	397		5.6%
2010	382		−3.8%
2020	391		2.4%
U.S. Decennial Census

=== 2010 census ===
As of the census of 2010, there were 382 people, 155 households, and 111 families living in the village. The population density was 1,157.6 inhabitants per square mile (447.0/km^{2}). There were 170 housing units at an average density of 515.2 per square mile (198.9/km^{2}). The racial makeup of the village was 96.6% White, 1.0% Native American, 0.3% Asian, 0.3% Pacific Islander, 0.5% from other races, and 1.3% from two or more races. Hispanic or Latino of any race were 3.9% of the population.

There were 155 households, of which 33.5% had children under the age of 18 living with them, 56.8% were married couples living together, 9.7% had a female householder with no husband present, 5.2% had a male householder with no wife present, and 28.4% were non-families. 24.5% of all households were made up of individuals, and 8.4% had someone living alone who was 65 years of age or older. The average household size was 2.46 and the average family size was 2.92.

The median age in the village was 38.5 years. 28.3% of residents were under the age of 18; 7.3% were between the ages of 18 and 24; 22.2% were from 25 to 44; 28.9% were from 45 to 64; and 13.1% were 65 years of age or older. The gender makeup of the village was 52.1% male and 47.9% female.

=== 2000 census ===
As of the census of 2000, there were 397 people, 162 households, and 110 families living in the village. The population density was 1,229.0 inhabitants per square mile (474.5/km^{2}). There were 177 housing units at an average density of 547.9 per square mile (211.5/km^{2}). The racial makeup of the village was 97.98% White, 1.01% from other races, and 1.01% from two or more races. Hispanic or Latino of any race were 1.26% of the population.

There were 162 households, out of which 34.6% had children under the age of 18 living with them, 56.8% were married couples living together, 8.0% had a female householder with no husband present, and 31.5% were non-families. 29.6% of all households were made up of individuals, and 14.2% had someone living alone who was 65 years of age or older. The average household size was 2.43 and the average family size was 3.03.

In the village, the population was spread out, with 28.2% under the age of 18, 8.6% from 18 to 24, 22.9% from 25 to 44, 27.0% from 45 to 64, and 13.4% who were 65 years of age or older. The median age was 38 years. For every 100 females, there were 111.2 males. For every 100 females age 18 and over, there were 105.0 males.

As of 2000 the median income for a household in the village was $36,719, and the median income for a family was $47,000. Males had a median income of $27,361 versus $20,536 for females. The per capita income for the village was $17,015. About 5.1% of families and 4.5% of the population were below the poverty line, including 5.0% of those under age 18 and 3.6% of those age 65 or over.
