= Phelps County, Nebraska =

County in Nebraska, United States

- County
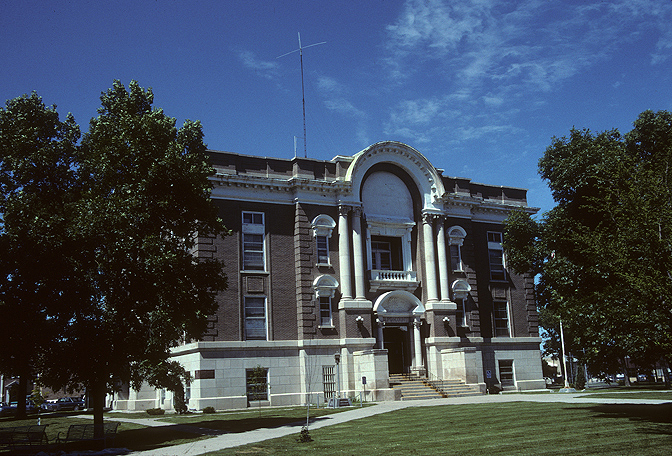
- Phelps County Courthouse in Holdrege

- Location within the U.S. state of Nebraska
- Coordinates: 40°31′N 99°25′W
- Country: United States
- State: Nebraska
- Founded: 1873
- Named for: William Phelps
- Seat: Holdrege
- Largest city: Holdrege

Area
  - Total: 540 sq mi (1,400 km^{2})
  - Land: 540 sq mi (1,400 km^{2})
  - Water: 0.6 sq mi (1.6 km^{2}) 0.1%

Population (2020)
  - Total: 8,968
  - Estimate (2025): 8,994 ▲
  - Density: 17/sq mi (6.4/km^{2})
- Time zone: UTC−6 (Central)
  - Summer (DST): UTC−5 (CDT)
- Congressional district: 3rd
- Website: www.phelpscounty.ne.gov

Phelps County is a county in the U.S. state of Nebraska. As of the 2020 United States census, the population was 8,968. Its county seat is Holdrege. The county was formed in 1873, and was named for William Phelps (1808–1889), a steamboat captain and early settler.

In the Nebraska license plate system, Phelps County is represented by the prefix 37 (it had the 37th-largest number of vehicles registered in the county when the license plate system was established in 1922).

It is considered part of the Kearney μSA's development and expansion plans.

== Geography ==
Phelps County terrain consists of low rolling hills, mostly devoted to agriculture, sloping to the east, and dropping off toward the river basin along its northern boundary line. The Platte River flows eastward along the north line.

The county has a total area of 540 square miles (1,400 km^{2}), of which 540 square miles (1,400 km^{2}) is land and 0.6 square miles (1.6 km^{2}) (0.1%) is water.

=== Major highways ===
- U.S. Highway 6
- U.S. Highway 34
- U.S. Highway 183
- Nebraska Highway 23

=== Transit ===
- Amtrak California Zephyr (Holdrege station)

=== Adjacent counties ===
- Kearney County – east
- Franklin County – southeast
- Harlan County – south
- Furnas County – southwest
- Gosper County – west
- Dawson County – northwest
- Buffalo County – northeast

=== Protected areas ===
- Atlanta Marsh National Wildlife Management Area
- Cottonwood Federal Waterfowl Production Area
- Johnson Federal Waterfowl Production Area
- Jones Federal Waterfowl Production Area
- Lake Seldom Wildlife Refuge
- Lynder Federal Waterfowl Production Area
- Richardson Lagoon State Wildlife Management Area
- Sacramento-Wilcox State Wildlife Management Area

== Demographics ==
Historical population
Census	Pop.	Note	%±
1880	2,447		—
1890	9,869		303.3%
1900	10,772		9.1%
1910	10,451		−3.0%
1920	9,900		−5.3%
1930	9,261		−6.5%
1940	8,452		−8.7%
1950	9,048		7.1%
1960	9,800		8.3%
1970	9,553		−2.5%
1980	9,769		2.3%
1990	9,715		−0.6%
2000	9,747		0.3%
2010	9,188		−5.7%
2020	8,968		−2.4%
2025 (est.)	8,994	▲	0.3%
US Decennial Census; 1790-1960 1900-1990; 1990-2000 2010

=== 2020 census ===
As of the 2020 census, the county had a population of 8,968. The median age was 42.8 years. 23.7% of residents were under the age of 18 and 22.2% of residents were 65 years of age or older. For every 100 females there were 100.2 males, and for every 100 females age 18 and over there were 96.4 males age 18 and over.

The racial makeup of the county was 92.4% White, 0.4% Black or African American, 0.4% American Indian and Alaska Native, 0.3% Asian, 0.0% Native Hawaiian and Pacific Islander, 2.2% from some other race, and 4.3% from two or more races. Hispanic or Latino residents of any race comprised 6.1% of the population.

60.8% of residents lived in urban areas, while 39.2% lived in rural areas.

There were 3,706 households in the county, of which 28.8% had children under the age of 18 living with them and 22.1% had a female householder with no spouse or partner present. About 29.4% of all households were made up of individuals and 14.0% had someone living alone who was 65 years of age or older.

There were 4,149 housing units, of which 10.7% were vacant. Among occupied housing units, 72.6% were owner-occupied and 27.4% were renter-occupied. The homeowner vacancy rate was 2.9% and the rental vacancy rate was 12.2%.

=== 2000 census ===
As of the 2000 United States census, there were 9,747 people, 3,844 households, and 2,683 families in the county. The population density was 18 people per square mile (6.9 people/km^{2}). There were 4,191 housing units at an average density of 8 units per square mile (3.1/km^{2}). The racial makeup of the county was 97.79% White, 0.11% Black or African American, 0.28% Native American, 0.28% Asian, 0.79% from other races, and 0.75% from two or more races. 2.26% of the population were Hispanic or Latino of any race.

There were 3,844 households, out of which 33.10% had children under the age of 18 living with them, 61.60% were married couples living together, 5.80% had a female householder with no husband present, and 30.20% were non-families. 26.70% of all households were made up of individuals, and 13.00% had someone living alone who was 65 years of age or older. The average household size was 2.47 and the average family size was 3.00.

The county population contained 26.50% under the age of 18, 6.10% from 18 to 24, 25.80% from 25 to 44, 23.60% from 45 to 64, and 18.10% who were 65 years of age or older. The median age was 39 years. For every 100 females there were 96.10 males. For every 100 females age 18 and over, there were 92.90 males.

The median income for a household in the county was $37,319, and the median income for a family was $44,943. Males had a median income of $28,962 versus $21,741 for females. The per capita income for the county was $19,044. About 6.20% of families and 8.90% of the population were below the poverty line, including 12.10% of those under age 18 and 7.70% of those age 65 or over.

== Communities ==
=== City ===
- Holdrege (county seat)

=== Villages ===
- Atlanta
- Bertrand
- Funk
- Loomis

=== Unincorporated communities ===
- Clyde
- Sacramento
- Westmark

=== Townships ===
- Anderson
- Center
- Cottonwood
- Divide
- Garfield
- Industry-Rock Falls
- Laird
- Lake
- Prairie
- Sheridan
- Union
- Westmark
- Westside
- Williamsburg

== Politics ==
Phelps County voters have been reliably Republican for decades. In no national election since 1936 has the county selected the Democratic Party candidate (as of 2024).

United States presidential election results for Phelps County, Nebraska
Year	Republican		Democratic		Third party(ies)	
Year	No.	%	No.	%	No.	%
1900	1,202	53.26%	979	43.38%	76	3.37%
1904	1,567	67.86%	219	9.48%	523	22.65%
1908	1,445	51.10%	1,238	43.78%	145	5.13%
1912	254	10.56%	972	40.42%	1,179	49.02%
1916	971	38.61%	1,425	56.66%	119	4.73%
1920	2,324	61.91%	1,169	31.14%	261	6.95%
1924	1,928	48.88%	993	25.18%	1,023	25.94%
1928	3,297	77.56%	927	21.81%	27	0.64%
1932	1,709	39.09%	2,589	59.22%	74	1.69%
1936	1,884	41.96%	2,587	57.62%	19	0.42%
1940	2,512	57.63%	1,847	42.37%	0	0.00%
1944	2,460	62.90%	1,451	37.10%	0	0.00%
1948	2,489	57.83%	1,815	42.17%	0	0.00%
1952	3,822	77.98%	1,079	22.02%	0	0.00%
1956	3,502	72.73%	1,313	27.27%	0	0.00%
1960	3,795	75.19%	1,252	24.81%	0	0.00%
1964	2,440	53.12%	2,153	46.88%	0	0.00%
1968	2,976	73.39%	825	20.35%	254	6.26%
1972	3,356	82.03%	735	17.97%	0	0.00%
1976	3,210	71.19%	1,168	25.90%	131	2.91%
1980	3,465	77.95%	734	16.51%	246	5.53%
1984	3,741	83.11%	740	16.44%	20	0.44%
1988	3,316	75.59%	1,047	23.87%	24	0.55%
1992	2,752	56.13%	830	16.93%	1,321	26.94%
1996	3,015	65.86%	1,071	23.39%	492	10.75%
2000	3,575	77.26%	934	20.19%	118	2.55%
2004	3,872	81.64%	830	17.50%	41	0.86%
2008	3,360	75.12%	1,050	23.47%	63	1.41%
2012	3,400	77.63%	880	20.09%	100	2.28%
2016	3,849	81.98%	572	12.18%	274	5.84%
2020	4,157	82.79%	752	14.98%	112	2.23%
2024	4,158	83.39%	758	15.20%	70	1.40%

== See also ==
- National Register of Historic Places listings in Phelps County, Nebraska
