= Holdrege, Nebraska =

- City
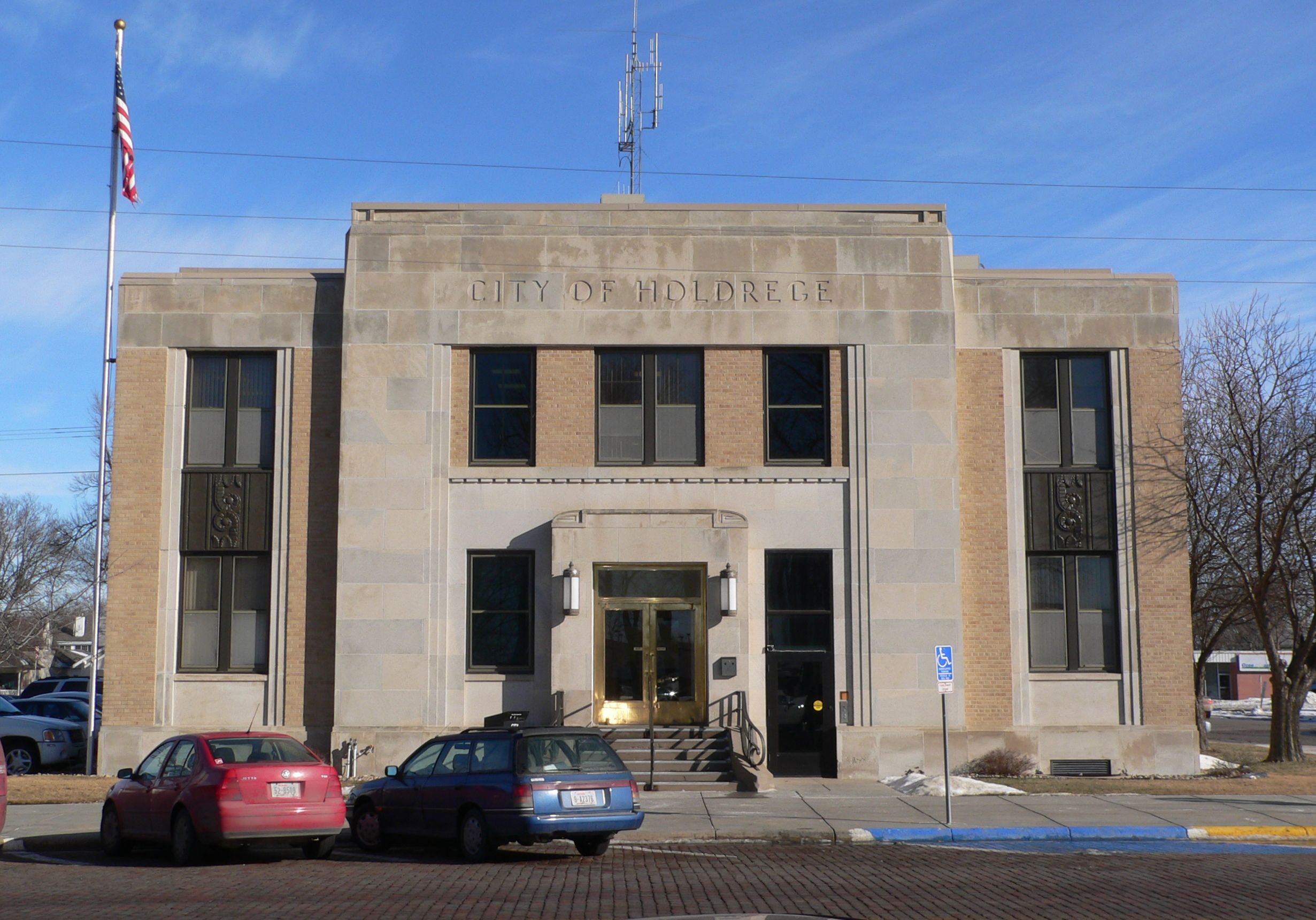
- Holdrege city hall

- Location of Holdrege, Nebraska
- Coordinates: 40°26′22″N 99°22′38″W
- Country: United States
- State: Nebraska
- County: Phelps

Government
  - Type: Mayor–council
  - Mayor: James Liffrig

Area
  - Total: 4.24 sq mi (10.98 km^{2})
  - Land: 4.23 sq mi (10.95 km^{2})
  - Water: 0.015 sq mi (0.04 km^{2})
- Elevation: 2,326 ft (709 m)

Population (2020)
  - Total: 5,515
  - Density: 1,305.0/sq mi (503.87/km^{2})
- Time zone: UTC-6 (Central (CST))
  - Summer (DST): UTC-5 (CDT)
- ZIP code: 68949
- Area code: 308
- FIPS code: 31-22640
- GNIS feature ID: 838058
- Website: www.cityofholdrege.org

Holdrege is a city in Phelps County, Nebraska, United States. The population was 5,515 at the 2020 census. It is the county seat of Phelps County. The Nebraska Prairie Museum is located in Holdrege.

== History ==
Holdrege was established in 1883 when the railroad was extended to that point. It was named for George Ward Holdrege, a railroad official. Holdrege was designated county seat in 1884.

Holdrege was settled primarily by immigrants from Sweden in the 1880s and was named after George Ward Holdrege, general manager of the Chicago, Burlington, and Quincy Railroad Company. He constructed most of the line's mileage in Nebraska, including a section through this small settlement in Phelps County. On December 10, 1883, the first train arrived in Holdrege, a pioneer town inhabited by 200 people.

In 1884, a campaign was started to move the county seat from Phelps Center to Holdrege, and an election was scheduled for October. By that time, the town had acquired a block of ground on which to erect a courthouse. With calm assurance of victory at the polls, Holdrege laid the cornerstone of the building intended to be the Phelps County Courthouse. At the special election, Holdrege received a majority of the votes but the legality of the election was questioned. So citizens of Holdrege went to Phelps Center, picked up the official records and books and hid them for two months pending the arrival of new county officials who would take over on January 1, 1885. Holdrege succeeded in becoming the county seat and the courthouse was completed.

Holdrege was incorporated on February 14, 1884, and quickly became the metropolis of the county, being well located with good roads from all directions. The early history of the town was one of ups and downs—good crops one year then drought and no crops at all for several years. In 1910, C. W. McConaughy, a Holdrege grain dealer, began crusading for use of the Platte River to supplement subsoil moisture for farmlands in the area. His dream became reality when Central Nebraska Public Power and Irrigation District began its power production and irrigation operations and water flowed into Phelps County for irrigation in 1941.

A large increase in the population of Holdrege in the immediate post-war years was due mostly to irrigation. With irrigation came both stable and increased crop production, which brought a pipeline company, grain elevators, and agriculture-related businesses to town. The city was declared a first-class city on May 4, 1967.

== Geography ==
According to the United States Census Bureau, the city has a total area of 3.87 square miles (10.02 km^{2}), of which 3.86 square miles (10.00 km^{2}) is land and 0.01 square miles (0.03 km^{2}) is water.

=== Climate ===
Climate data for Holdrege, Nebraska (1991–2020 normals, extremes 1897–present)
Month	Jan	Feb	Mar	Apr	May	Jun	Jul	Aug	Sep	Oct	Nov	Dec	Year
Record high °F (°C)	74 (23)	79 (26)	96 (36)	101 (38)	103 (39)	110 (43)	113 (45)	110 (43)	105 (41)	96 (36)	88 (31)	80 (27)	113 (45)
Mean maximum °F (°C)	59.2 (15.1)	64.8 (18.2)	76.7 (24.8)	84.0 (28.9)	91.1 (32.8)	96.3 (35.7)	99.0 (37.2)	96.3 (35.7)	93.1 (33.9)	86.7 (30.4)	72.8 (22.7)	60.9 (16.1)	99.9 (37.7)
Mean daily maximum °F (°C)	36.7 (2.6)	40.6 (4.8)	52.4 (11.3)	62.4 (16.9)	72.2 (22.3)	83.2 (28.4)	87.3 (30.7)	85.1 (29.5)	78.5 (25.8)	65.2 (18.4)	50.9 (10.5)	39.1 (3.9)	62.8 (17.1)
Daily mean °F (°C)	25.0 (−3.9)	28.3 (−2.1)	38.7 (3.7)	48.6 (9.2)	59.2 (15.1)	70.3 (21.3)	74.8 (23.8)	72.7 (22.6)	64.7 (18.2)	51.4 (10.8)	37.9 (3.3)	27.6 (−2.4)	49.9 (10.0)
Mean daily minimum °F (°C)	13.2 (−10.4)	15.9 (−8.9)	24.9 (−3.9)	34.9 (1.6)	46.3 (7.9)	57.3 (14.1)	62.4 (16.9)	60.2 (15.7)	50.9 (10.5)	37.6 (3.1)	24.9 (−3.9)	16.2 (−8.8)	37.1 (2.8)
Mean minimum °F (°C)	−4.8 (−20.4)	−1.5 (−18.6)	7.8 (−13.4)	22.1 (−5.5)	33.0 (0.6)	47.4 (8.6)	53.5 (11.9)	51.2 (10.7)	37.9 (3.3)	22.0 (−5.6)	9.1 (−12.7)	−0.7 (−18.2)	−9.3 (−22.9)
Record low °F (°C)	−22 (−30)	−28 (−33)	−14 (−26)	4 (−16)	19 (−7)	37 (3)	42 (6)	42 (6)	23 (−5)	4 (−16)	−11 (−24)	−29 (−34)	−29 (−34)
Average precipitation inches (mm)	0.56 (14)	0.69 (18)	1.63 (41)	2.81 (71)	4.42 (112)	3.90 (99)	4.23 (107)	3.59 (91)	2.08 (53)	2.03 (52)	0.94 (24)	0.71 (18)	27.59 (700)
Average snowfall inches (cm)	5.6 (14)	7.0 (18)	3.9 (9.9)	1.8 (4.6)	0.2 (0.51)	0.0 (0.0)	0.0 (0.0)	0.0 (0.0)	0.0 (0.0)	0.8 (2.0)	2.0 (5.1)	4.1 (10)	25.4 (64.11)
Average precipitation days (≥ 0.01 in)	3.3	3.9	5.8	7.9	10.8	9.1	7.9	7.8	6.0	5.5	3.7	3.1	74.8
Average snowy days (≥ 0.1 in)	2.9	3.1	1.9	0.8	0.0	0.0	0.0	0.0	0.0	0.4	1.1	2.6	12.8
Source: NOAA

== Demographics ==
Historical population
Census	Pop.	Note	%±
1890	2,601		—
1900	3,007		15.6%
1910	3,030		0.8%
1920	3,108		2.6%
1930	3,263		5.0%
1940	3,360		3.0%
1950	4,381		30.4%
1960	5,226		19.3%
1970	5,635		7.8%
1980	5,624		−0.2%
1990	5,671		0.8%
2000	5,636		−0.6%
2010	5,495		−2.5%
2020	5,515		0.4%
U.S. Decennial Census; 2012 Estimate

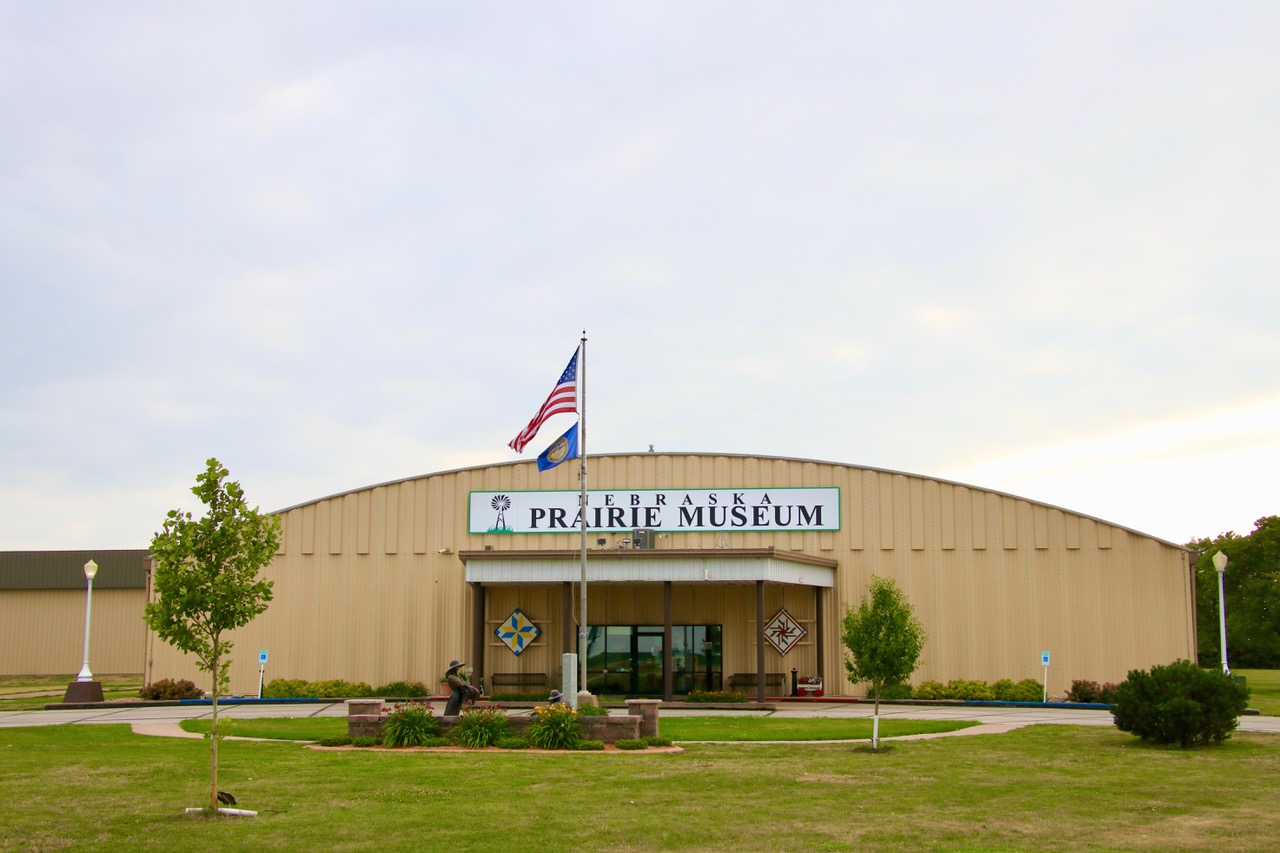
Nebraska Prairie Museum

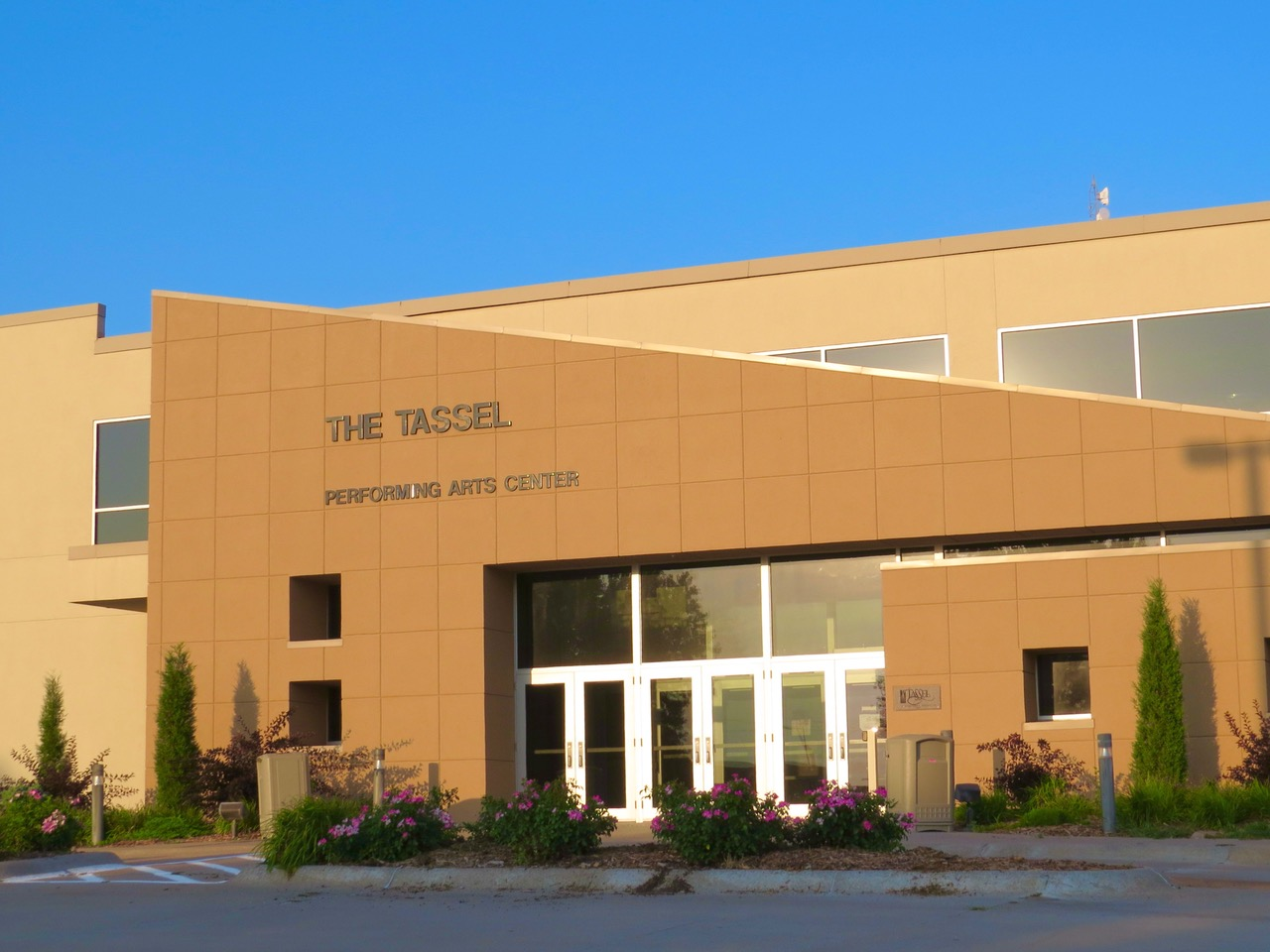
The Tassel

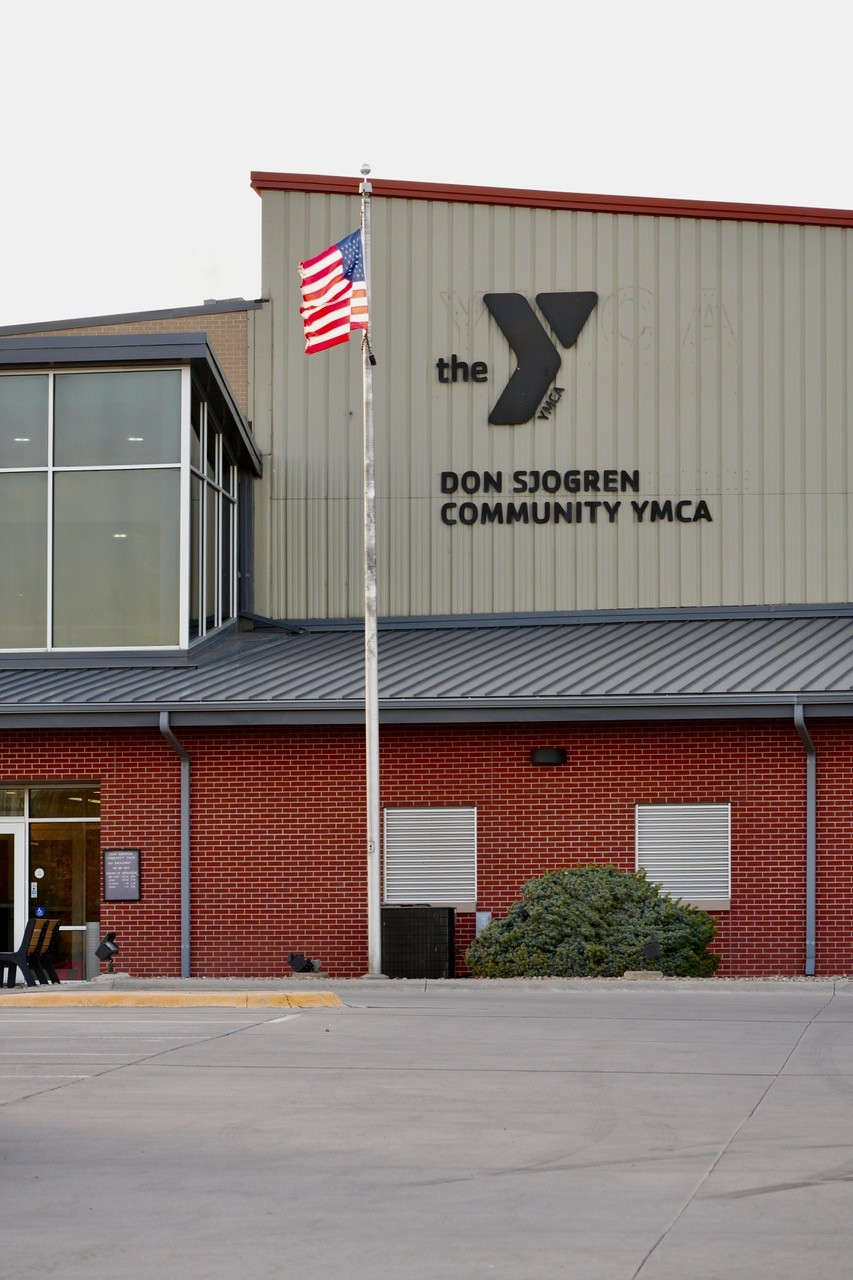
Don Sjogren Community YMCA

=== 2020 census ===
As of the 2020 census, Holdrege had a population of 5,515. The population density was 1,303.8 inhabitants per square mile (503.7/km^{2}). The city had 1,370 families. The median age was 41.0 years. 23.3% of residents were under the age of 18 and 21.3% were 65 years of age or older. For every 100 females, there were 96.7 males, and for every 100 females age 18 and over, there were 92.4 males age 18 and over.

98.9% of residents lived in urban areas, while 1.1% lived in rural areas.

There were 2,329 households in Holdrege, of which 27.8% had children under the age of 18 living in them. Of all households, 50.8% were married-couple households, 17.8% were households with a male householder and no spouse or partner present, and 25.6% were households with a female householder and no spouse or partner present. About 32.2% of all households were made up of individuals and 14.5% had someone living alone who was 65 years of age or older. The average household size was 2.1 and the average family size was 2.8.

There were 2,610 housing units, of which 10.8% were vacant. The homeowner vacancy rate was 3.8% and the rental vacancy rate was 14.6%.

Racial composition as of the 2020 census
Race	Number	Percent
White	5,079	92.1%
Black or African American	25	0.5%
American Indian and Alaska Native	19	0.3%
Asian	19	0.3%
Native Hawaiian and Other Pacific Islander	0	0.0%
Some other race	115	2.1%
Two or more races	258	4.7%
Hispanic or Latino (of any race)	362	6.6%

=== Income and poverty ===
The 2016–2020 5-year American Community Survey estimates show that the median household income was $53,241 (with a margin of error of +/- $6,868) and the median family income $72,500 (+/- $8,145). Males had a median income of $42,031 (+/- $2,653) versus $27,450 (+/- $3,404) for females. The median income for those above 16 years old was $34,981 (+/- $3,807). Approximately, 10.2% of families and 15.2% of the population were below the poverty line, including 18.1% of those under the age of 18 and 8.0% of those ages 65 or over.

=== 2010 census ===
As of the census of 2010, there were 5,495 people, 2,351 households, and 1,496 families living in the city. The population density was 1,423.6 inhabitants per square mile (549.7/km^{2}). There were 2,589 housing units at an average density of 670.7 per square mile (259.0/km^{2}). The racial makeup of the city was 96.7% White, 0.1% African American, 0.4% Native American, 0.2% Asian, 1.5% from other races, and 1.0% from two or more races. Hispanic or Latino of any race were 4.7% of the population.

There were 2,351 households, of which 28.6% had children under the age of 18 living with them, 52.1% were married couples living together, 7.8% had a female householder with no husband present, 3.7% had a male householder with no wife present, and 36.4% were non-families. 32.4% of all households were made up of individuals, and 14.7% had someone living alone who was 65 years of age or older. The average household size was 2.27 and the average family size was 2.87.

The median age in the city was 42.4 years. 23.8% of residents were under the age of 18; 6.7% were between the ages of 18 and 24; 22.3% were from 25 to 44; 28% were from 45 to 64; and 19.3% were 65 years of age or older. The gender makeup of the city was 48.5% male and 51.5% female.

=== 2000 census ===
As of the census of 2000, there were 5,636 people, 2,355 households, and 1,544 families living in the city. The population density was 1,498.5 inhabitants per square mile (578.6/km^{2}). There were 2,602 housing units at an average density of 691.8 per square mile (267.1/km^{2}). The racial makeup of the city was 97.29% White, 0.14% African American, 0.34% Native American, 0.25% Asian, 1.03% from other races, and 0.96% from two or more races. Hispanic or Latino of any race were 3.11% of the population.

There were 2,355 households, out of which 30.7% had children under the age of 18 living with them, 56.3% were married couples living together, 7.1% had a female householder with no husband present, and 34.4% were non-families. 30.4% of all households were made up of individuals, and 14.8% had someone living alone who was 65 years of age or older. The average household size was 2.35 and the average family size was 2.93.

In the city, the population was spread out, with 25.5% under the age of 18, 6.2% from 18 to 24, 25.6% from 25 to 44, 23.9% from 45 to 64, and 18.8% who were 65 years of age or older. The median age was 40 years. For every 100 females, there were 92.4 males. For every 100 females age 18 and over, there were 87.2 males.

As of 2000 the median income for a household in the city was $36,225, and the median income for a family was $44,939. Males had a median income of $29,288 versus $22,281 for females. The per capita income for the city was $20,569. About 5.7% of families and 8.8% of the population were below the poverty line, including 11.5% of those under age 18 and 7.5% of those age 65 or over.

== Economy ==
The major employers in Holdrege include:

- Allmand Brothers
- Becton Dickinson
- Holdrege Memorial Homes
- Holdrege Public Schools
- Integrated Electrical Service
- LandMark Implement
- Phelps Memorial Health Center

== Arts and culture ==
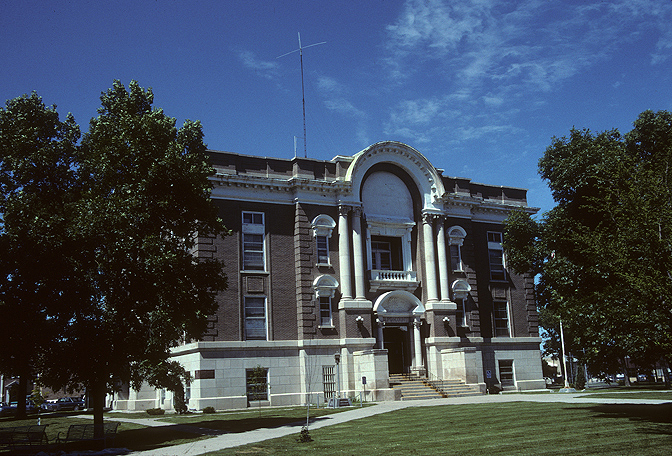
Phelps County Courthouse

The Nebraska Prairie Museum is located in Holdrege. The museum averages 23,000 visitors per year.

The Tassel is a performing arts center opened in 1999, with a seating capacity of 818.

Holdrege station, Kinner House, and Phelps County Courthouse are listed on the National Register of Historic Places.

== Sports ==
The Holdrege White Sox played as members of the short–season Class D level Nebraska State League from 1956 to 1959 as an affiliate of the Chicago White Sox. Holdrege first fielded a team in the 1903 Central Nebraska League, winning the league title. The White Sox hosted home minor league games at Holdrege Fairgrounds Park.

== Parks and recreation ==
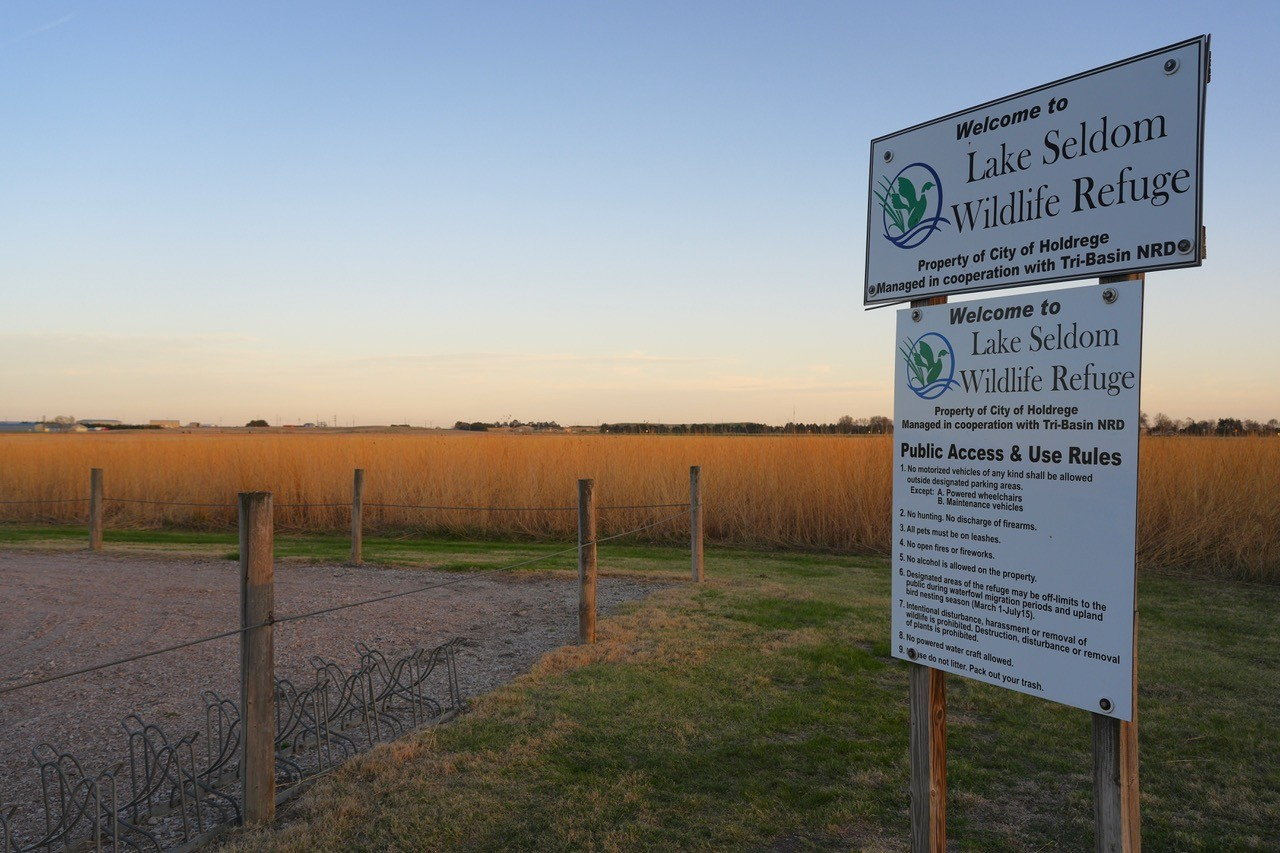
Lake Seldom Wildlife Refuge

The 40,000 square feet (3,700 m^{2}) Don Sjogren Community YMCA, opened in 2006, serves more than 3,200 members from 30 communities in south-central Nebraska.

The 325-acre (132 ha) Lake Seldom Wildlife Refuge south of Holdrege is the largest municipally owned wildlife refuge in Nebraska.

The Phelps County Fairgrounds in Holdrege features exhibition halls and the Phelps County Agricultural Center.

== Government ==
The mayor of Holdrege serves a four-year term, and presides at city council meetings. City council consists of eight elected members, two members for each ward. The mayor is James Liffrig.

== Education ==
Education is administered by Holdrege Public Schools. Schools include:

- Holdrege Elementary School
- Holdrege Middle School
- Holdrege High School

== Infrastructure ==
=== Transportation ===
US 183 passes south to north through the city, while US 6/34 traverses it west to east. A bus system is operated by the Phelps County Senior Center. Amtrak, the national passenger rail system, provides daily service through Holdrege, operating its California Zephyr daily in both directions between Chicago and Emeryville, California, across the bay from San Francisco.

=== Public safety ===
The Holdrege Police Department employs ten sworn officers, and the fire department consists of up to 40 volunteer firefighters.

== Notable people ==
- John O. Almquist, scientist
- Tom Carlson, member of the Nebraska Legislature
- Mark R. Christensen, member of the Nebraska Legislature
- Joseph P. Cleland, U.S. Army major general Recipient of the Soldier's Medal
- Ralph D. Cornell, landscape architect
- Barbara Granlund, member of the Washington House of Representatives and Washington State Senate
- Susanne E. Jalbert, activist for economic development, women's rights, and gender equity
- Jerry Johnson, member of the Nebraska Legislature
- George Lundeen, sculptor with work displayed in the National Statuary Hall Collection.
- DiAnna Schimek, member of the Nebraska Legislature
- Harry Schmidt, U.S. Marine Corps general, commanding general during the Mariana Islands Campaign
- Jefferson Machamer, Cartoonist and Illustrator

== In popular culture ==
A Death in the Desert, a short story by Willa Cather, begins on a train in Holdrege.
