= Hanson House =

Hanson House or Hanson Farm may refer to:

in the United States

(by state, then city/town)

- B. F. Hanson House, Middletown, Delaware, listed on the National Register of Historic Places (NRHP) in New Castle County
- Anton E. Hanson House, Chicago, Illinois, NRHP-listed in South Side Chicago
- Alfred Hanson House, Oelwein, Iowa, NRHP-listed in Fayette County
- George Hanson Barn, Leona, Kansas, NRHP-listed in Doniphan County
- Hans Hanson House, Marquette, Kansas, NRHP-listed
- Alden Hanson House, Midland, Michigan, NRHP-listed in Midland County
- John W. Hanson House, Stambaugh, Michigan, NRHP-listed in Iron County
- Hanson House (Florissant, Missouri), NRHP-listed
- Hanson-Downing House, Kearney, Nebraska, NRHP-listed in Buffalo County
- Howard Hanson House, Wahoo, Nebraska, NRHP-listed in Saunders County
- Hanson House (Maumee, Ohio), NRHP-listed in Lucas County
- Stewart-Hanson Farm, Stow, Ohio, NRHP-listed in Summit County
- Nels M. Hanson Farmstead, Henry, South Dakota, NRHP-listed in Codington County
- Olson-Hanson Farm, Clifton, Texas, NRHP-listed in Bosque County
- Soren Hanson House, Hyrum, Utah, NRHP-listed in Cache County

== See also ==
- Hanson Historic District, Hanson, Kentucky, NRHP-listed in Hopkins County, Kentucky
- Hansen House (disambiguation)
