= Hansen House =

Hansen House may refer to:

in Israel

- Hansen House (Jerusalem), in Talbiya neighborhood

in the United States

- Hansen House, a division of the original Chas. H. Hansen Music Corp., based in Miami, Florida
- Peter Hansen House (Pierre, South Dakota), listed on the National Register of Historic Places (NRHP) in Hughes County
- Hansen House (Racine, Wisconsin), listed on the NRHP in Racine County
- Thompson-Hansen House, Brigham City, Utah, listed on the NRHP in Box Elder County, Utah
- Peter Hansen House (Manti, Utah), listed on the NRHP in Sanpete County
- Johnson-Hansen House, Provo, Utah, listed on the NRHP in Utah County

== See also ==
- Peter Hansen House (disambiguation)
- Hanson House (disambiguation)
