= National Register of Historic Places listings in Buffalo County, Nebraska =

Location of Buffalo County in Nebraska

Buffalo County, Nebraska, United States, has 23 properties and districts listed on the National Register of Historic Places. The locations of National Register properties and districts for which the latitude and longitude coordinates are included below, may be seen in a map.

This National Park Service list is complete through NPS recent listings posted July 4, 2026.

== Current listings ==
| | Name on the Register | Image | Date listed | Location | City or town | Description |
|---|---|---|---|---|---|---|
| 1 | John Barnd House | John Barnd House | March 31, 1983 (#83001079) | 320 E. 31st St. 40°42′23″N 99°04′34″W | Kearney | Victorian Queen Anne style house built by prominent attorney John Barnd c.1892. The property includes a frame carriage barn which is presently used as a garage. |
| 2 | John J. and Lenora Bartlett House | John J. and Lenora Bartlett House | December 27, 2007 (#07001321) | 1402 9th Ave. 40°41′19″N 99°05′39″W | Kearney | |
| 3 | Bohning Memorial Auditorium | | March 3, 2023 (#100008672) | 112 West Genoa St. 41°01′31″N 98°54′47″W | Ravenna | |
| 4 | Fort Theater | Fort Theater | July 12, 2006 (#06000607) | 2205 Central Ave. 40°41′52″N 99°04′52″W | Kearney | |
| 5 | George W. Frank House | George W. Frank House | February 23, 1973 (#73001054) | University of Nebraska at Kearney; 40°42′03″N 99°06′30″W | Kearney | Richardsonian Romanesque style mansion made with Colorado red sandstone from Wyoming. Built in 1889 by George W. Frank |
| 6 | Gibbon Baptist Church | Gibbon Baptist Church | March 21, 2016 (#15000897) | 917 2nd St. 40°44′48″N 98°50′44″W | Gibbon | |
| 7 | Hanson-Downing House | Hanson-Downing House | December 10, 1980 (#80002440) | 723 W. 22nd St. 40°41′53″N 99°05′32″W | Kearney | |
| 8 | Harmon Park | Harmon Park | December 10, 2010 (#10001002) | Roughly bounded by 29th and 33rd Sts. and 5th and 7th Aves. 40°42′24″N 99°05′23″W | Kearney | |
| 9 | Kearney Downtown Historic District | Kearney Downtown Historic District | November 9, 2017 (#100001797) | Multiple; 40°41′52″N 99°04′54″W | Kearney | |
| 10 | Kearney Junior High School | Kearney Junior High School | July 5, 2000 (#00000766) | 300 W. 24th St. 40°41′57″N 99°05′09″W | Kearney | |
| 11 | Kearney National Guard Armory | Kearney National Guard Armory | July 16, 2009 (#09000525) | 1600 Central Ave. 40°41′25″N 99°04′55″W | Kearney | |
| 12 | Kilgore Bridge | Kilgore Bridge | June 29, 1992 (#92000768) | Nebraska Highway 10 over the North Channel Platte River, 7.1 miles southeast of Kearney; 40°41′02″N 98°57′03″W | Kearney | |
| 13 | Klehm House | Klehm House | March 25, 1999 (#99000388) | 2215 9th Ave. 40°41′54″N 99°05′39″W | Kearney | |
| 14 | Lowe and Fair Commercial Block | Lowe and Fair Commercial Block | June 3, 2015 (#14001012) | 2001-2003 Central Ave., 10-12 E. Railroad St. 40°41′44″N 99°04′53″W | Kearney | |
| 15 | Masonic Temple and World Theater Building | Masonic Temple and World Theater Building | November 10, 2009 (#09000903) | 2318 Central Ave. 40°41′56″N 99°04′54″W | Kearney | |
| 16 | Meisner Bank Building | Meisner Bank Building | March 25, 1999 (#99000390) | 128 C St. 40°46′50″N 98°44′02″W | Shelton | |
| 17 | George Meisner House | George Meisner House | June 23, 1988 (#88000903) | 12185 Shelton Rd. 40°47′50″N 98°44′25″W | Shelton | |
| 18 | Nebraska Wind Sculpture | | July 7, 2026 (#100012976) | Kearney Rest Area Westbound, Interstate 80, MM 270.94; 40°40′17″N 99°07′16″W | Kearney vicinity | |
| 19 | Saint Luke's Protestant Episcopal Church | Saint Luke's Protestant Episcopal Church | December 1, 1986 (#86003360) | 2304 2nd Ave. 40°42′20″N 99°05′35″W | Kearney | |
| 20 | Shelton Public Library | | October 31, 2024 (#100010940) | 313 C St. 40°46′39″N 98°44′02″W | Shelton | |
| 21 | Sweetwater Archeological Site | Sweetwater Archeological Site | July 29, 1974 (#74001141) | SW 1/4, section 35, township 13N, range 15W; 41°02′53″N 99°00′58″W | Sweetwater | |
| 22 | Sweetwater Mill Bridge | Sweetwater Mill Bridge | June 29, 1992 (#92000767) | County road over Mud Creek; 41°02′27″N 99°00′27″W | Sweetwater | |
| 23 | Dr. A.O. Thomas House | Dr. A.O. Thomas House | February 28, 1980 (#80002441) | 2222 9th Ave. 40°41′55″N 99°05′39″W | Kearney | |
| 24 | U.S. Post Office | U.S. Post Office | September 17, 1981 (#81000368) | 2401 Central Ave. 40°41′59″N 99°04′52″W | Kearney | |

== See also ==
- List of National Historic Landmarks in Nebraska
- National Register of Historic Places listings in Nebraska
