= Peter Hansen House =

Peter Hansen House may refer to:

- Peter Hansen House (Pierre, South Dakota), listed on the National Register of Historic Places (NRHP) in Hughes County
- Peter Hansen House (Manti, Utah), listed on the NRHP in Sanpete County

== See also ==
- Hansen House (disambiguation)
