= KPVA-LP =

- Shelton, Nebraska; United States
- Frequency: 92.7 MHz

Programming
- Format: Defunct

Ownership
- Owner: Platte Valley Educational Radio

Technical information
- Licensing authority: FCC
- Facility ID: 135442
- Class: L1
- ERP: 100 watts
- HAAT: 25.6 meters (84 ft)
- Transmitter coordinates: 40°47′42″N 98°42′31″W

Links
- Public license information: LMS
- Website: http://www.radio74.net

KPVA-LP (92.7 FM) was a radio station licensed to Shelton, Nebraska, United States. The station was owned by Platte Valley Educational Radio, and broadcast a religious format.

On May 11, 2012, the licensee requested the cancellation of its license. The license was cancelled by the Federal Communications Commission and the call sign deleted from its database on May 31, 2012.
