= Meisner Bank Building =

- U.S. National Register of Historic Places
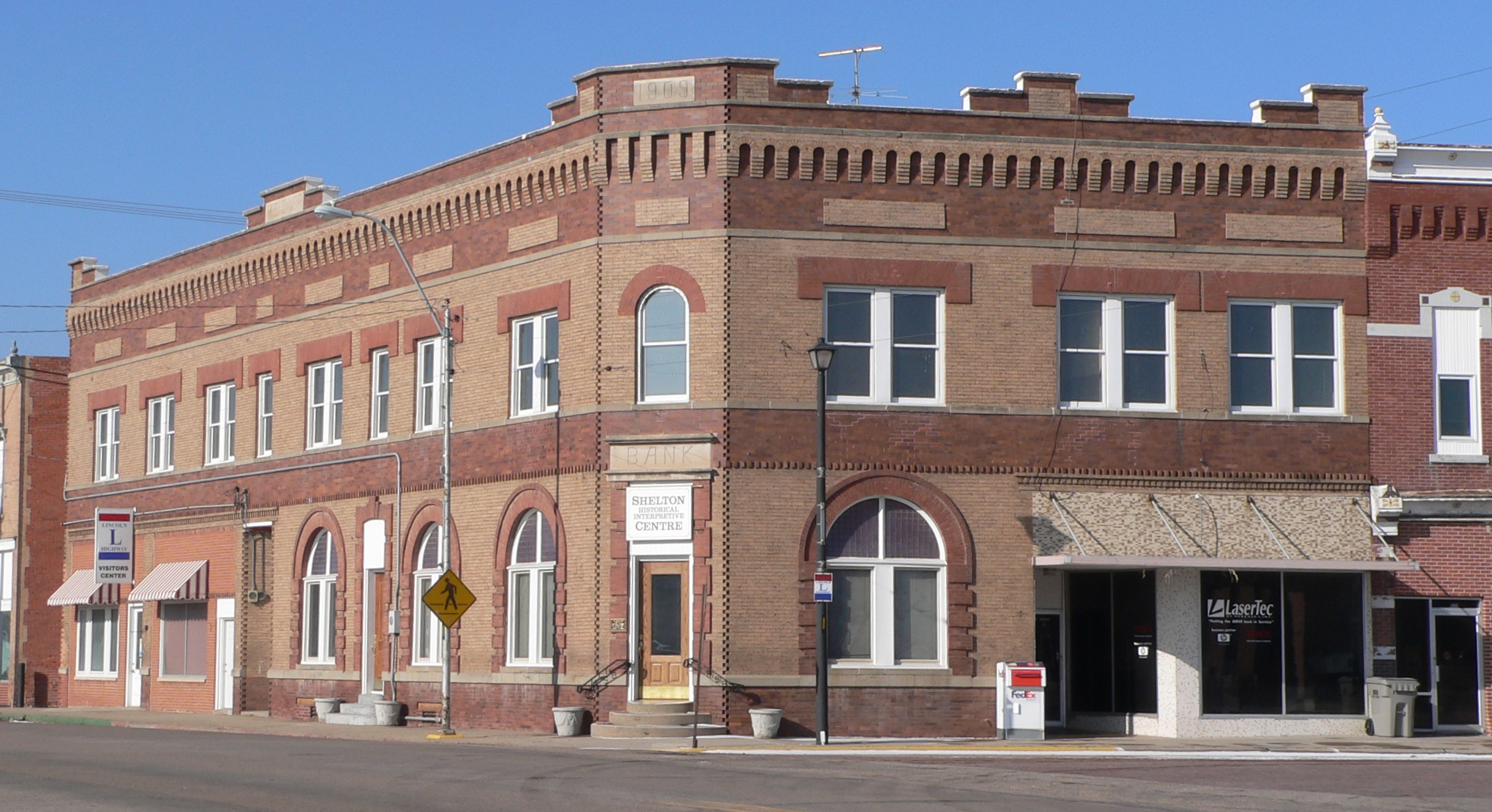
- The building in 2010

- Location within Nebraska Location within the United States
- Location: 128 C Street, Shelton, Nebraska
- Coordinates: 40°46′50″N 98°44′02″W
- Area: less than one acre
- Built: 1910
- Architectural style: Renaissance Revival
- NRHP reference No.: 99000390
- Added to NRHP: March 25, 1999

The Meisner Bank Building is a historic two-story building in Shelton, Nebraska. It was built in 1908-1910 for the Meisner Bank founded by George Meisner in 1894. The building designed in the Renaissance Revival style. It has been listed on the National Register of Historic Places since March 25, 1999.
