= George Meisner =

- George Meisner in 1889
- Born: George Meisner; March 19, 1845; Bavaria, Germany
- Died: March 2, 1909 (aged 63)
- Resting place: Shelton Cemetery, Shelton, Nebraska, United States

George Meisner (March 19, 1845 – March 2, 1909) was a prominent German-born American banker, bank owner, bank president, builder of the Shelton Opera House, and namesake for Meisner's Bank in Shelton, Nebraska and the George Meisner House.

The son of Casper Meisner, George immigrated with his family to Troy, New York as a boy in 1848. Following a devastating fire circa 1853-1854, the family moved west to Iowa.

In a move that was criticized by some Republicans, on October 21, 1882, at the Buffalo County Republican Convention held in Kearney, Nebraska, Meisner a member of the Democratic Party, was nominated as a representative of Buffalo County for the Republican Party.

After Meisner's death, the total value of his estate was appraised at over $600,000.
