= John Barnd House =

- U.S. National Register of Historic Places
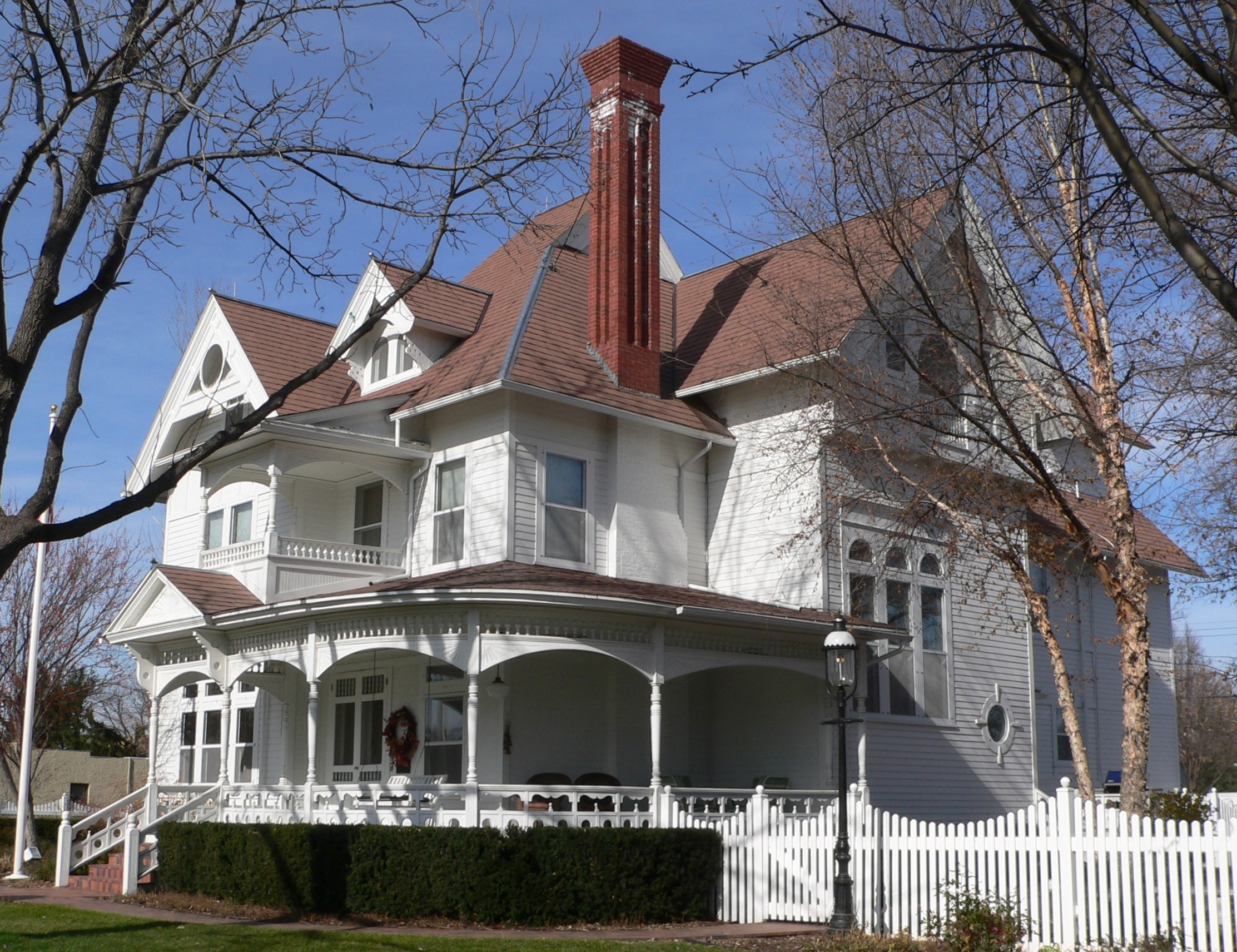

- Location within Nebraska Location within the United States
- Location: 320 East 31st Street, Kearney, Nebraska
- Coordinates: 40°42′23″N 99°04′34″W
- Area: less than one acre
- Built: 1892
- Architectural style: Queen Anne
- NRHP reference No.: 83001079
- Added to NRHP: March 31, 1983

The John Barnd House is a historic house in Kearney, Nebraska. It was built in 1892 for John Barnd, a veteran of the Union Army during the Civil War of 1861-1865 who founded the Mutual Loan and Investment Company of Kearney and was the co-owner of the Commercial and Savings Bank of Kearney. The house was designed in the Queen Anne architectural style. It has been listed on the National Register of Historic Places since March 31, 1983.
