= World Theatre (Kearney, Nebraska) =

Historic movie theater in Kearney, Nebraska

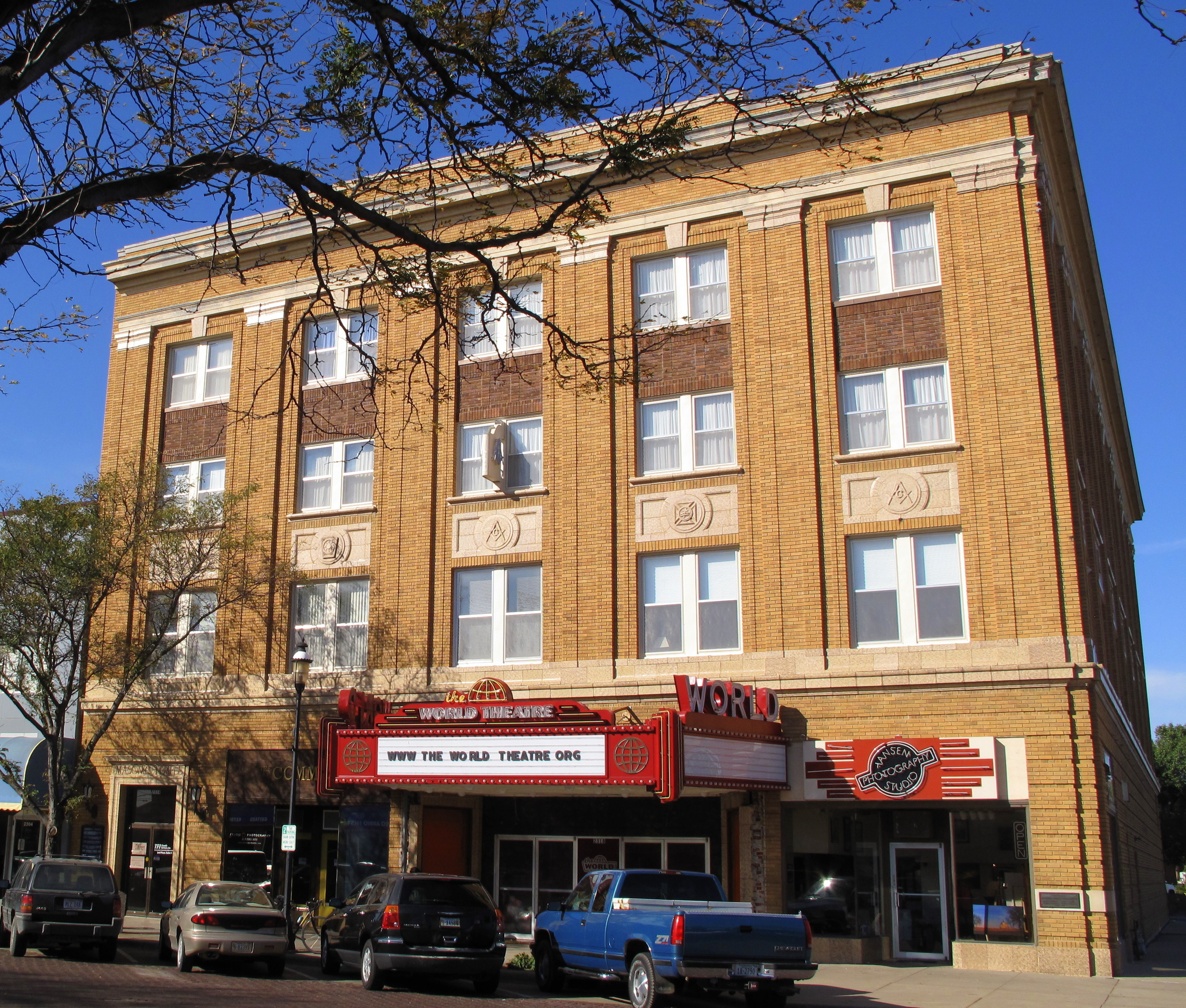
- The building's exterior in 2011
- Interactive map of World Theatre
- Address: 2318 Central Avenue; Kearney, Nebraska; United States
- Coordinates: 40°41′57″N 99°04′55″W

Construction
- Opened: November 14, 1927; 99 years ago
- Years active: 1927–2008; 2012–present
- Architect: James T. Allen
- Masonic Temple and World Theater Building
- U.S. National Register of Historic Places
- NRHP reference No.: 09000903
- Added to NRHP: November 10, 2009

The World Theatre is a historic movie theater and performing arts center in Kearney, Nebraska. The building, which also housed a Masonic Temple on its upper three floors, was designed by James T. Allen in the Classical Revival style. It is listed in the National Register of Historic Places.

== History ==
The World Theatre originally opened as a vaudeville venue on November 14, 1927. It did not begin screening movies until the 1930s. In 1983, the venue was converted to host an additional auditorium. Following the conversion, the theater began to decline, especially as the city of Kearney grew and locals were drawn away from the historic downtown district into new suburban districts.

In 2008, the World Theatre permanently closed after 80 years of operation. The facility remained dormant until 2011 when Kearney native Jon Bokenkamp led an initiative to restore and reopen it. The project initially began with T-shirt fundraisers but later received over US$1,000,000 in funds from private donors as well as city and state grants. The theater reopened on June 29, 2012; Nebraskan filmmaker Alexander Payne presented a screening of the 1959 crime comedy Some Like It Hot and hosted a question-and-answer session.

On March 17, 2020, the World Theatre closed indefinitely for planned renovations and as a reaction to the COVID-19 pandemic. The persistence of the pandemic caused the theater's reopening to be delayed until February 2021. The scope of changes included the installation of new balcony seats, a revised concession stand, and new stage lighting, among other alterations.

== See also ==
- National Register of Historic Places in Buffalo County, Nebraska
