= Fort Theater =

- U.S. National Register of Historic Places
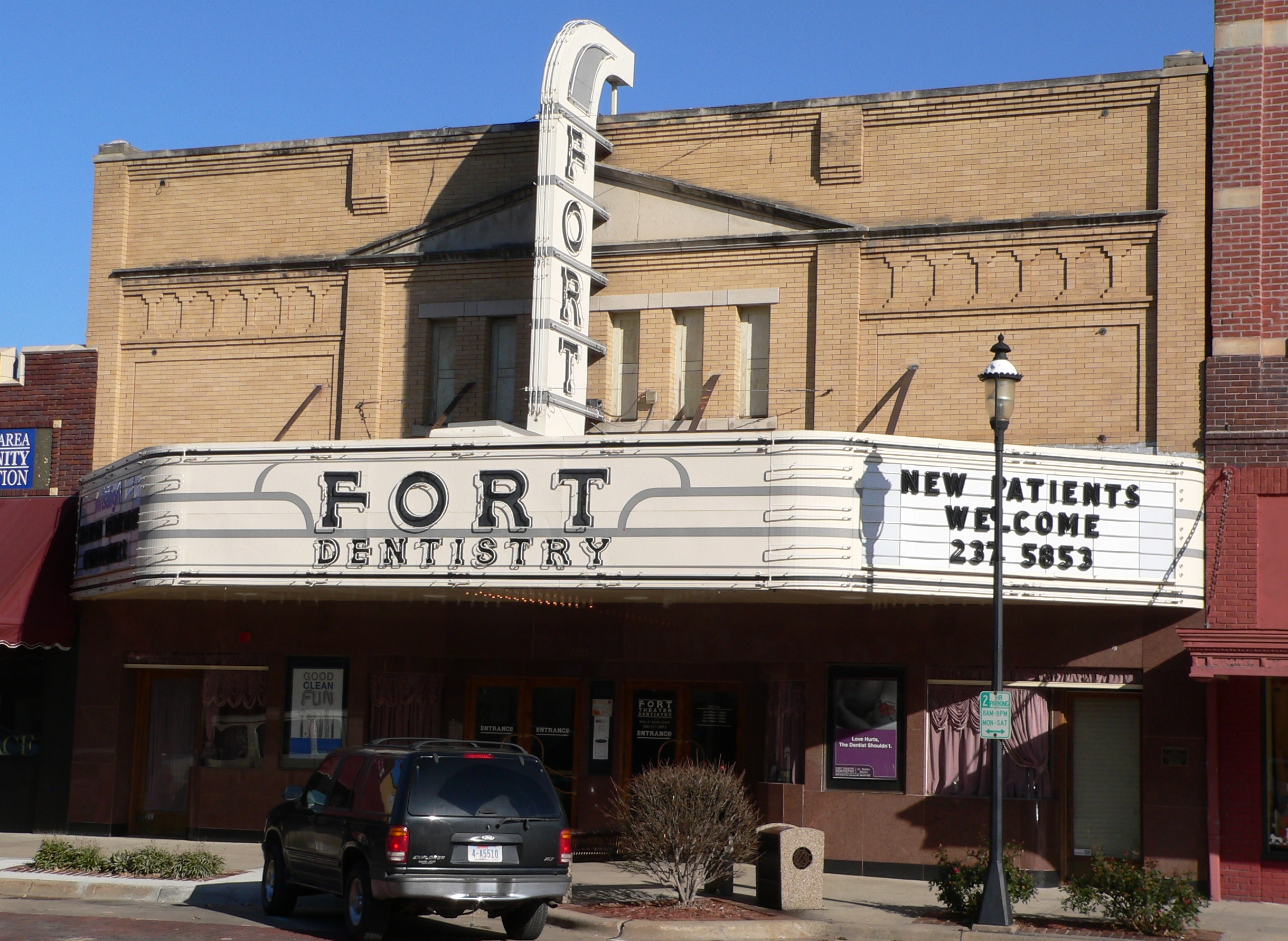
- The building in 2009

- Location within Nebraska Location within the United States
- Location: 2205 Central Avenue, Kearney, Nebraska
- Coordinates: 40°41′52″N 99°04′52″W
- Area: less than one acre
- Built: 1914
- Architect: Edward J. Sessinghaus
- Architectural style: Classical Revival, Moderne
- NRHP reference No.: 06000607
- Added to NRHP: July 12, 2006

Fort Theater is a historic two-story building in Kearney, Nebraska. It was built in 1914 as The Empress by F.G. Keens, and designed in the Classical Revival style. After it was partly destroyed in 1940, it was purchased by Don and George Monroe, who added a marquee to the facade; it was designed in the Moderne style by architect Edward J. Sessinghaus. Inside, there are murals by Joyce Ballantyne. The building has been listed on the National Register of Historic Places since July 12, 2006.
