= Klehm House =

- U.S. National Register of Historic Places
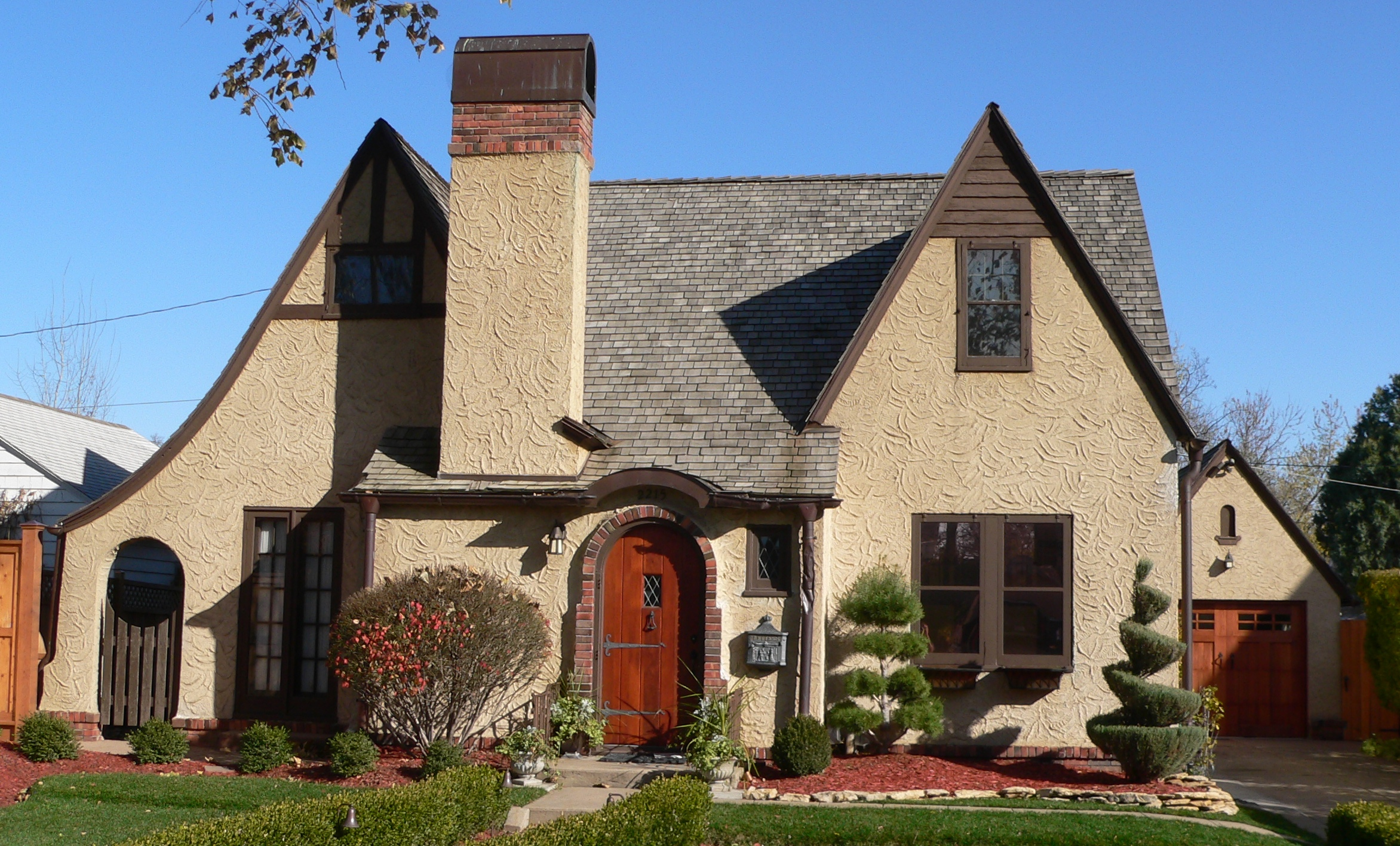
- The house in 2009

- Location within Nebraska Location within the United States
- Location: 2215 9th Avenue, Kearney, Nebraska
- Coordinates: 40°41′54″N 99°05′39″W
- Area: less than one acre
- Built: 1931
- Architect: Walter Klehm
- Architectural style: Tudor Revival
- NRHP reference No.: 99000388
- Added to NRHP: March 25, 1999

The Klehm House is a historic house in Kearney, Nebraska. It was built in 1931 for Walter Klehm, a professor of Manual Arts at the University of Nebraska at Kearney. It was designed in the Tudor Revival architectural style by Klehm himself. It has been listed on the National Register of Historic Places since March 25, 1999.
