= George Meisner House =

Historic house in Nebraska, United States

- U.S. National Register of Historic Places
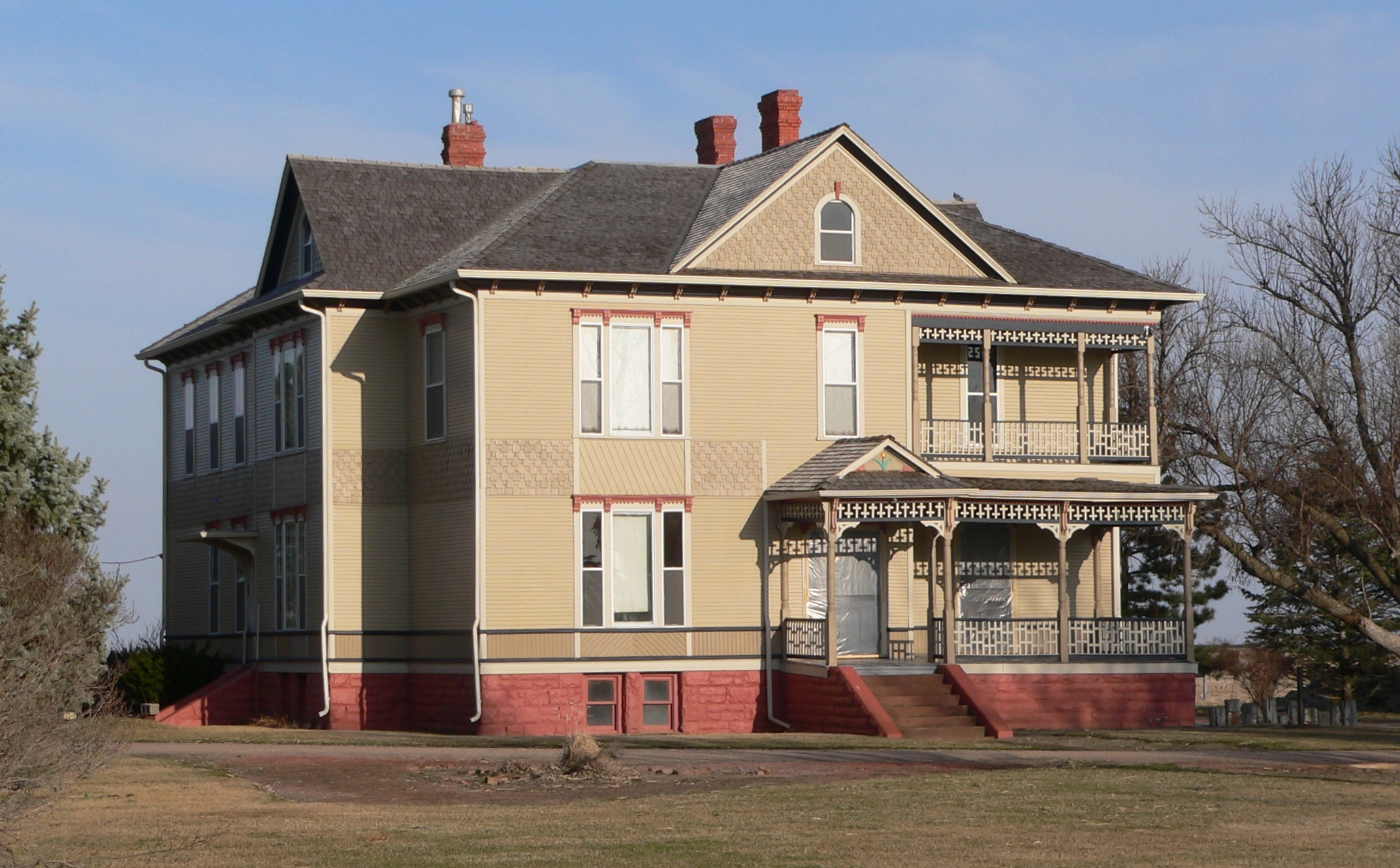
- Meisner house from NW

- Location within Nebraska Location within the United States
- Location: Shelton Rd., near Shelton, Nebraska
- Coordinates: 40.797277°N 98.740031°W
- Area: 5 acres (2.0 ha)
- Built: 1893-94
- Built by: G. Keneval
- Architectural style: Queen Anne Style; Neo-Classical
- NRHP reference No.: 88000903
- Added to NRHP: June 23, 1988

George Meisner House is a rural mansion located approximately one mile north of the town of Shelton, Nebraska. The house was constructed in 1893-1894 and was built in the Queen Anne style. In about 1915, during an "anti-Victorian" period, it was remodeled to more Neo-Classical styling.

It is a two-story frame house on a raised basement of Colorado limestone. When completed it "was described as a residence that 'excels in every respect, any other in central Nebraska' (Shelton Clipper, Aug. 17, 1894)". It was a home of George Meisner, a rancher, landowner, and businessman.

Besides the house, two other contributing buildings were included in the listing: a two-story frame carriage barn and an adjacent one-story frame garage.

In 1988, the house was added to the National Register of Historic Places.
