= John J. and Lenora Bartlett House =

- U.S. National Register of Historic Places
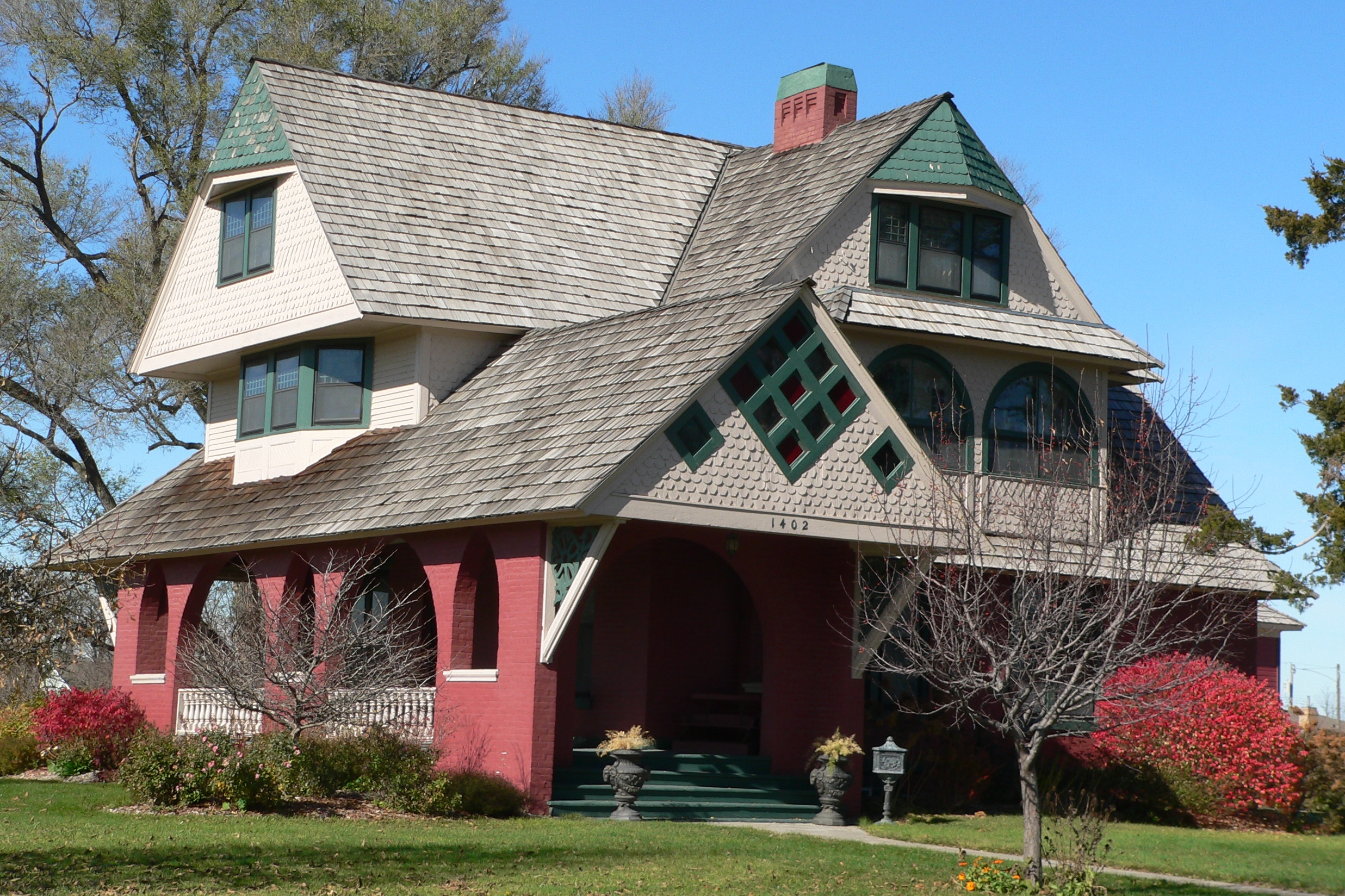
- The house in 2009

- Location within Nebraska Location within the United States
- Location: 1402 9th Avenue, Kearney, Nebraska
- Coordinates: 40°41′19″N 99°05′39″W
- Area: less than one acre
- Built: 1888
- Built by: John Scott, V.V. Yost
- Architectural style: Queen Anne
- NRHP reference No.: 07001321
- Added to NRHP: December 27, 2007

The John J. and Lenora Bartlett House is a historic house in Kearney, Nebraska. Built in 1888 for John Bartlett, president of the Kearney National Bank, it was designed in the Queen Anne architectural style. It was owned by Edward Webster from 1903 to 1919, when it was purchased by John Bartlett's wife, Lenora. It has been listed on the National Register of Historic Places since December 27, 2007.
