= Sweetwater Archeological Site =

- U.S. National Register of Historic Places
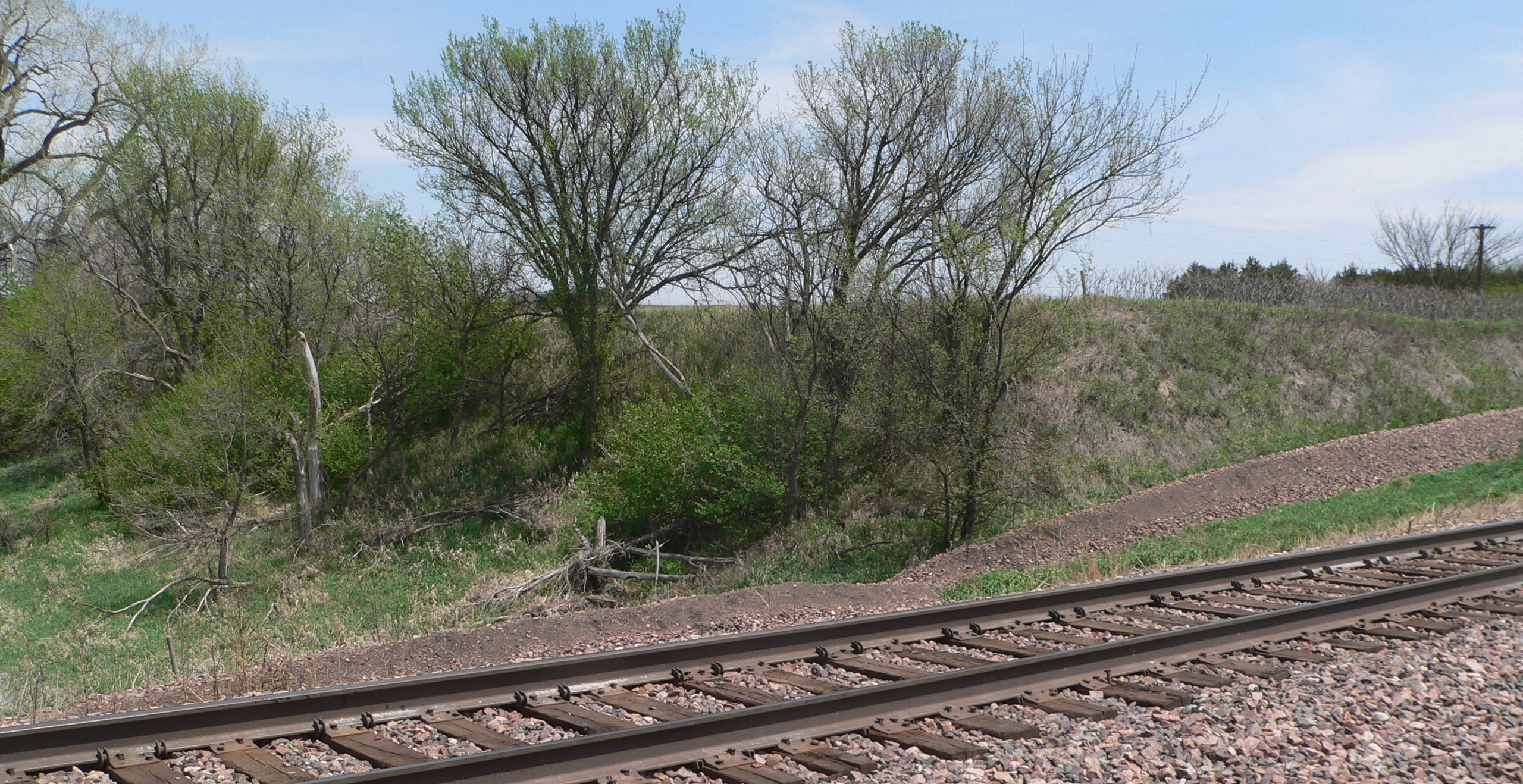
- Nearest city: Sweetwater, Nebraska
- Area: 55 acres (22 ha)
- NRHP reference No.: 74001141
- Added to NRHP: July 29, 1974

The Sweetwater Archeological Site, near Sweetwater, Nebraska, was listed on the National Register of Historic Places in 1974.

It is the site of a prehistoric village, and it was registered for its potential to yield information in the future.

File:Sweetwater archaeological site (Nebraska) (3).JPG and another Commons file provide some identifying information.
