= B. F. Hanson House =

Historic house in Delaware, US

- U.S. National Register of Historic Places
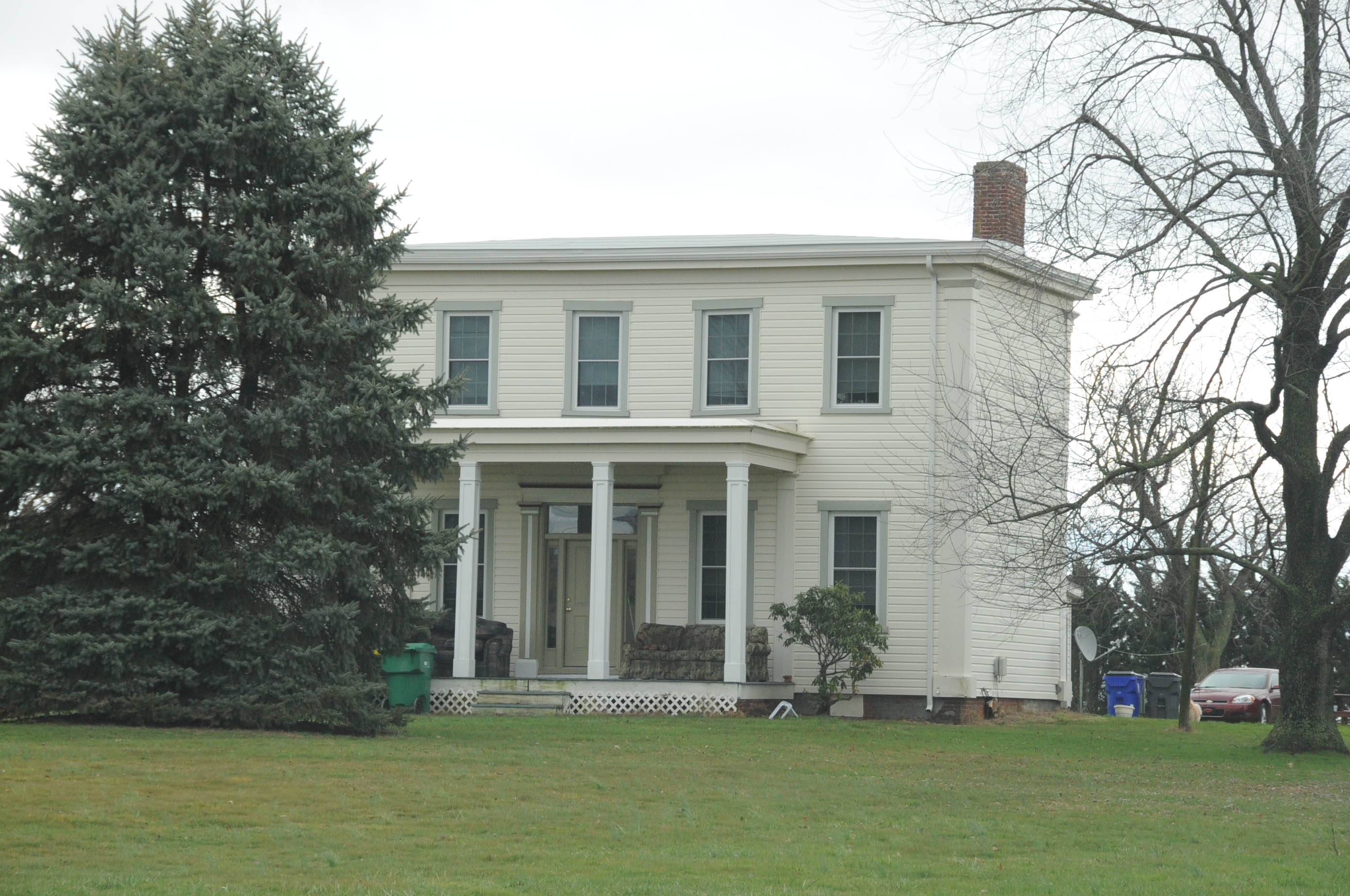

- Location within Delaware Location within the United States
- Location: 1130 Middletown-Warwick Road in St. Georges Hundred, Middletown, Delaware
- Coordinates: 39.427861°N 75.759776°W
- Area: 5.3 acres (2.1 ha)
- Built: 1843
- Architectural style: Greek Revival
- NRHP reference No.: 82002332
- Added to NRHP: April 27, 1982

B. F. Hanson House is a historic home located near Middletown in New Castle County, Delaware, United States. It was built in 1843, and is a frame dwelling consisting of a rectangular, two-story, five-bay, central hall plan main block, with a two-story rear ell. It is in a vernacular Greek Revival style. It has a front porch supported by four columns and features graded siding, applied pilasters with capitals and footers, integrated brick chimneys, and a double ridge cornice.

It was listed on the National Register of Historic Places in 1982.
