= Thompson-Hansen House =

- U.S. National Register of Historic Places
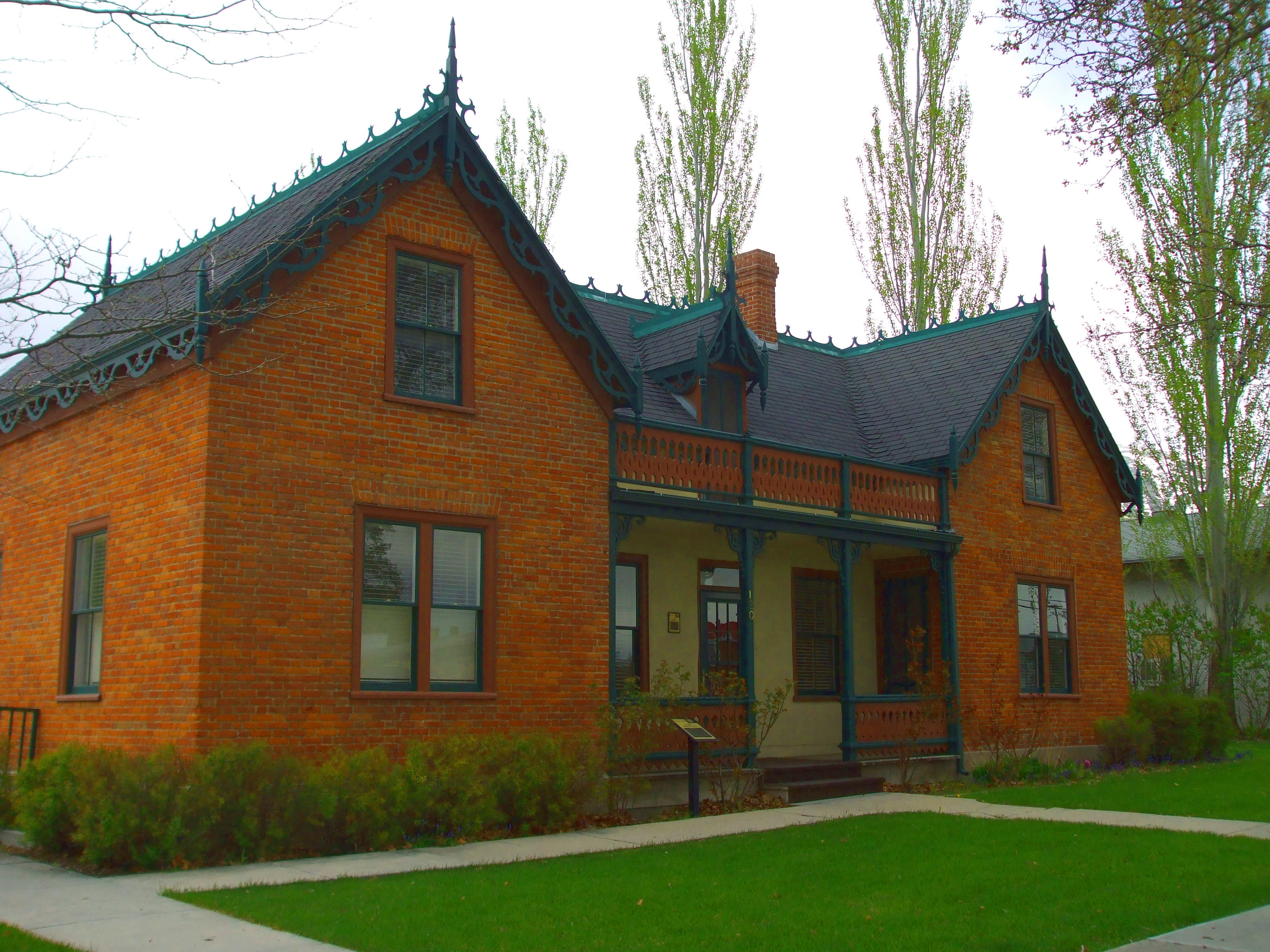
- The Thompson-Hansen House, April 2010

- Location within Utah Location within the United States
- Location: 120 North Main Street; Brigham City, Utah; United States
- Coordinates: 41.513390°N 112.015400°W
- Area: 0.5 acres (0.20 ha)
- Built: c.1860, c.1880
- Built by: Gilbert, George; Thompson, James
- Architectural style: Late Gothic Revival, Vernacular double cross-wing
- NRHP reference No.: 94001474
- Added to NRHP: December 23, 1994

The Thompson-Hansen House is a historic residence in Brigham City, Utah, United States, that is listed on the National Register of Historic Places.

== Description ==
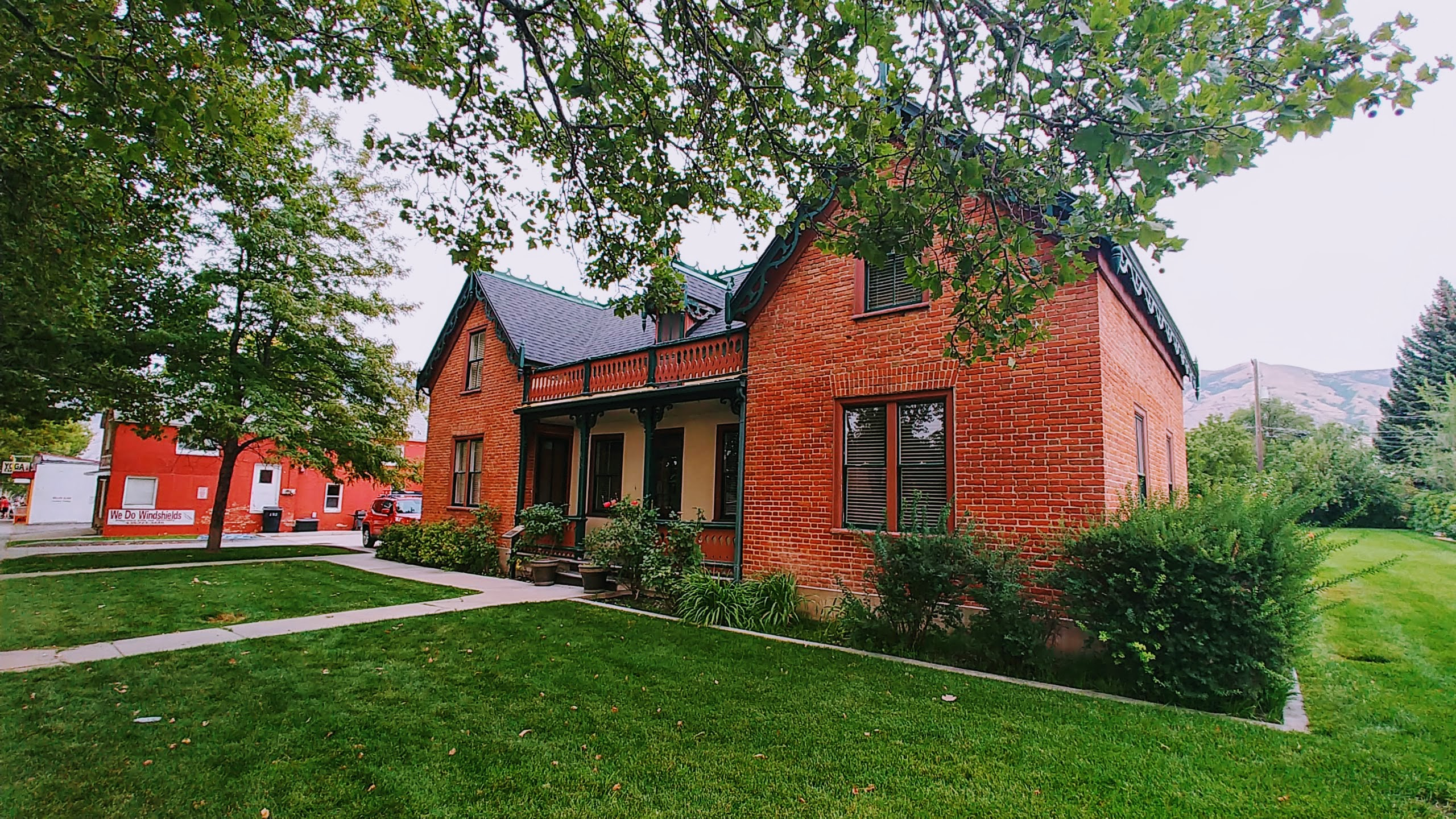
The Thompson-Hansen House, September 2019

The house, which was built around 1860, is located at 120 North Main Street (SR-13). It is a one-and-a-half-story house, whose original, center section was started as an adobe house and later painted to appear as a brick house. Two cross-wings were added around 1880.

The original section was built by or for George Gilbert (1816-1908) and his wife Mary Blackwell Gilbert (1813-1887) who were born in Cornwall, England, and who immigrated with their daughter and three sons in the mid-1850s.

The house was listed on the National Register of Historic Places on December 23, 1994.

== See also ==
- National Register of Historic Places listings in Box Elder County, Utah
