= Anton E. Hanson House =

Historic house in Illinois, United States

- U.S. National Register of Historic Places
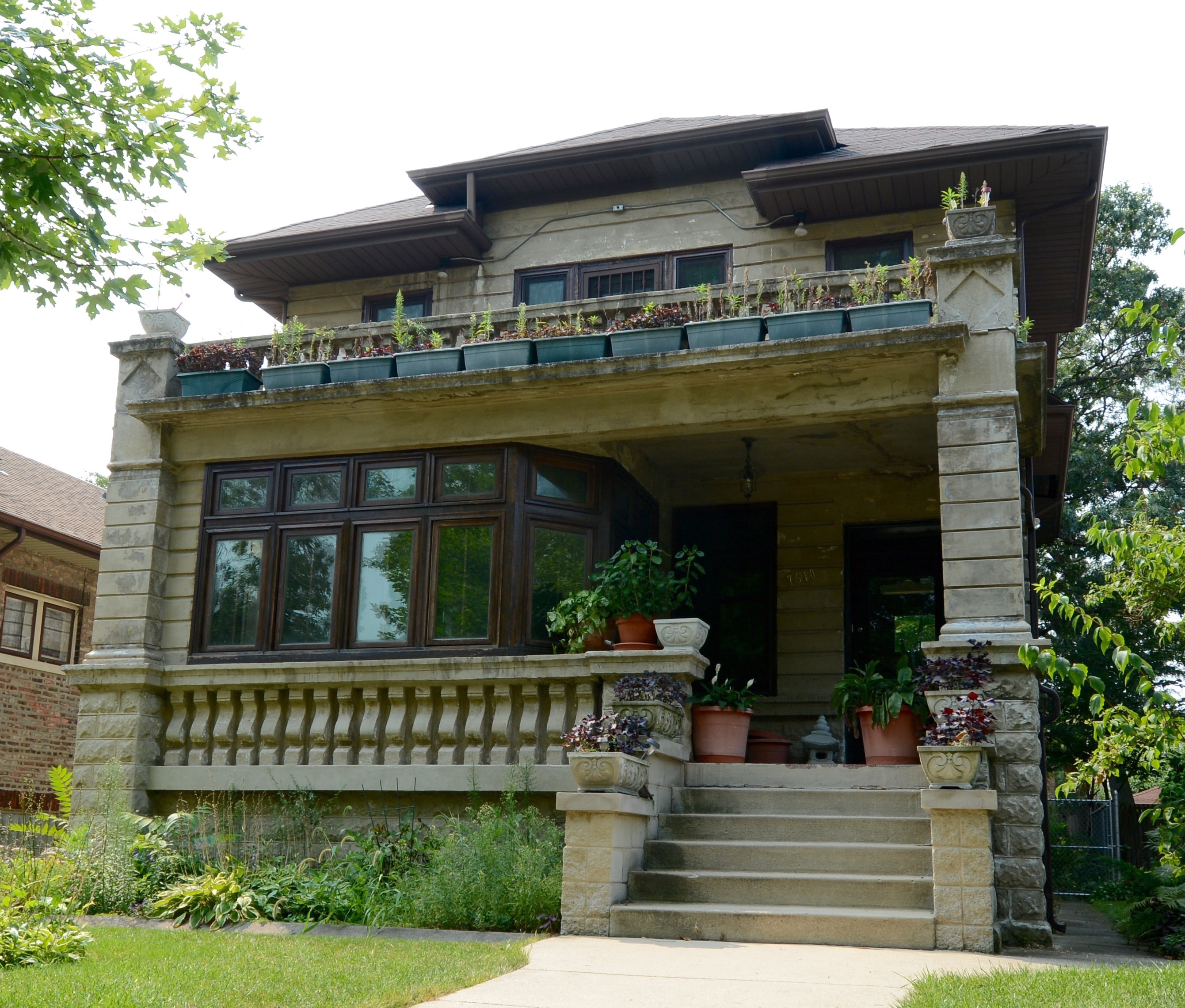

- Location within Chicago metropolitan area Location within Illinois Location within the United States
- Location: 7610 S. Ridgeland Ave., Chicago, Illinois
- Coordinates: 41°45′24″N 87°34′57″W
- Area: less than one acre
- Built: 1912
- Architect: Hale, Perley
- Architectural style: American Foursquare
- NRHP reference No.: 06000008
- Added to NRHP: February 9, 2006

The Anton E. Hanson House is a historic house at 7610 S. Ridgeland Avenue in the South Shore neighborhood of Chicago, Illinois. Real estate developer Anton E. Hanson had the house built for his family in 1912. The house also allowed Hanson to test concrete block construction, an increasingly popular method that Hanson later used in two other houses. Architect Perley Hale designed the American Foursquare house. Hale's design added decorative stone features to the concrete exterior, including balustrades on the porch and balcony and a cornice below the balcony.

The house was added to the National Register of Historic Places on February 9, 2006.
