= Alfred Hanson House =

Historic house in Iowa, United States

- U.S. National Register of Historic Places
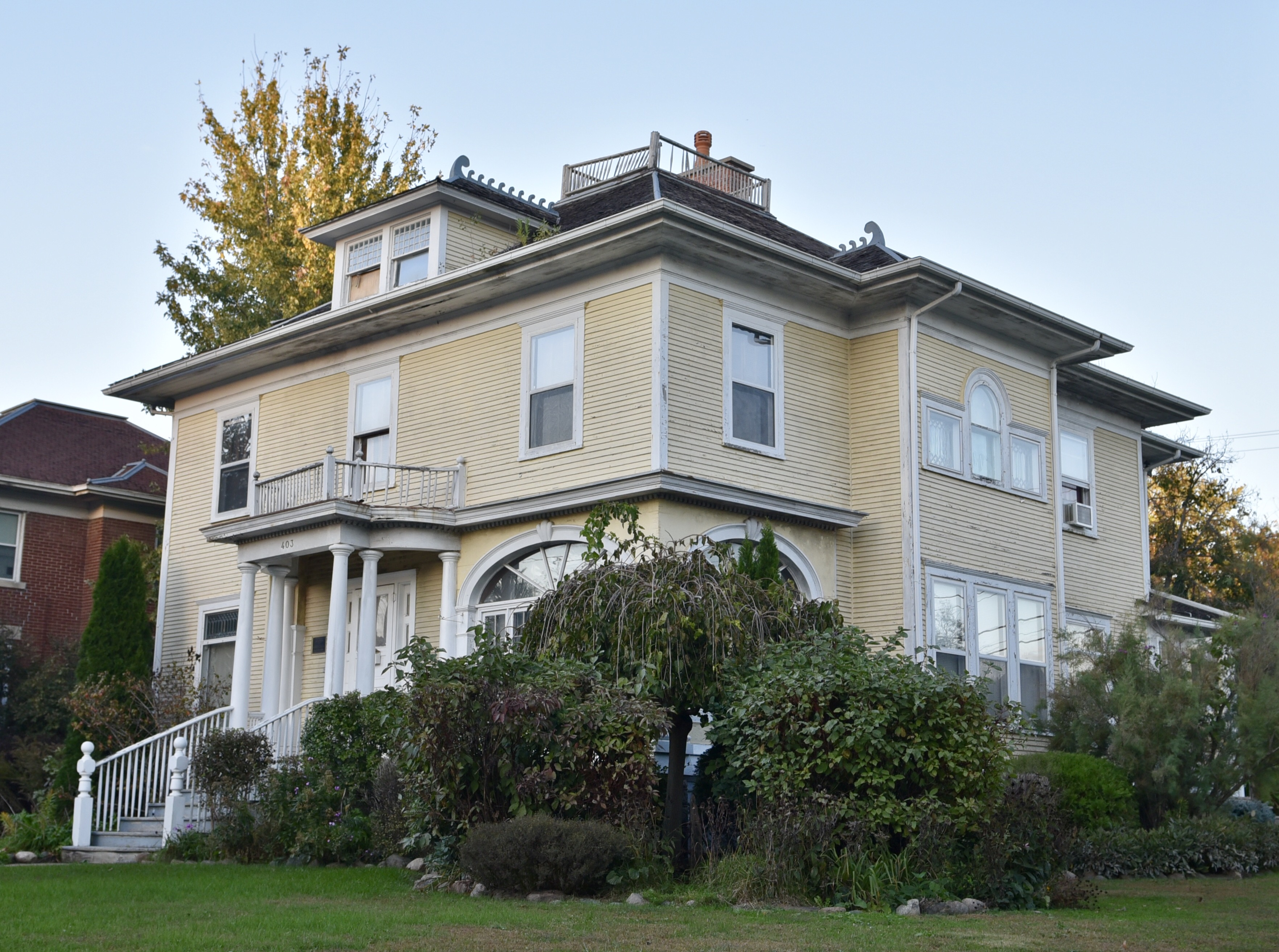

- Location within Iowa Location within the United States
- Location: 403 N. Frederick Ave. Oelwein, Iowa
- Coordinates: 42°41′0.7″N 91°54′46.6″W
- Area: less than one acre
- Built: 1904
- Architect: Netcott & Donnan
- NRHP reference No.: 84001252
- Added to NRHP: July 12, 1984

The Alfred Hanson House, also known as the Hanson/McCarthy House, is a historic building located in Oelwein, Iowa, United States. Alfred Hanson was an Oelwein native who was engaged in farming before he moved back to town and became a banker. He had this house built in 1904. The two-story, frame Colonial Revival was designed by Harry E. Netcott of the Independence, Iowa architectural firm of Netcott & Donnan. Its distinctive features include a two-thirds recessed sun porch that was enclosed in 1957, a Palladian window, and an open Portico on the main facade. It was listed on the National Register of Historic Places in 1984.
