= Hanson House (Florissant, Missouri) =

Historic house in Missouri, United States

- U.S. National Register of Historic Places
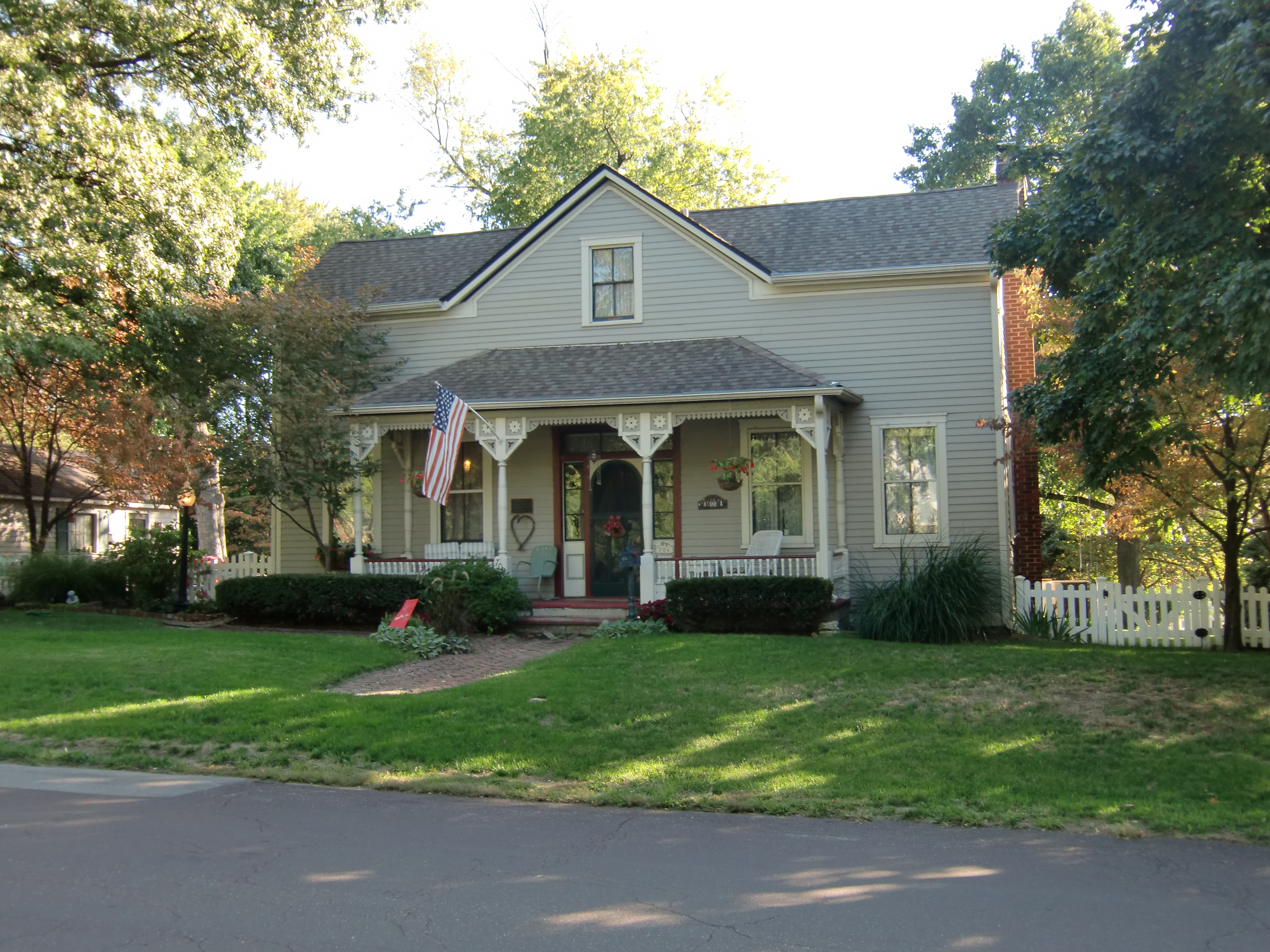

- Location within Missouri Location within the United States
- Location: 704 Ste. Catherine, Florissant, Missouri
- Coordinates: 38°47′30″N 90°19′34″W
- Area: less than one acre
- Built: 1897
- MPS: St. Ferdinand City MRA
- NRHP reference No.: 79003654
- Added to NRHP: September 12, 1979

The Hanson House in Florissant, Missouri is a historic house located at 704 Ste. Catherine. The house was built in 1897 in what was then an outlying area of the City of St. Ferdinand, and was renovated in 1947. It was added to the National Register of Historic Places in 1979.

It is a frame house, vernacular in style, but with some classical details such as "entablature window heads". According to a historic resources inventory done in Florissant in 1978, echoed also in a 1979 study, it has the "finest Eastlake porch in area."

The 1947 renovations were to enlarge the basement, remove old buildings behind, and install an indoor bathroom.

In the 1970s the area of St. Ferdinand was assessed for its historic resources, leading to the listing in 1979 of the Hanson House and many other houses, buildings, and historic districts on the National Register of Historic Places.
