= Soren Hanson House =

- U.S. National Register of Historic Places
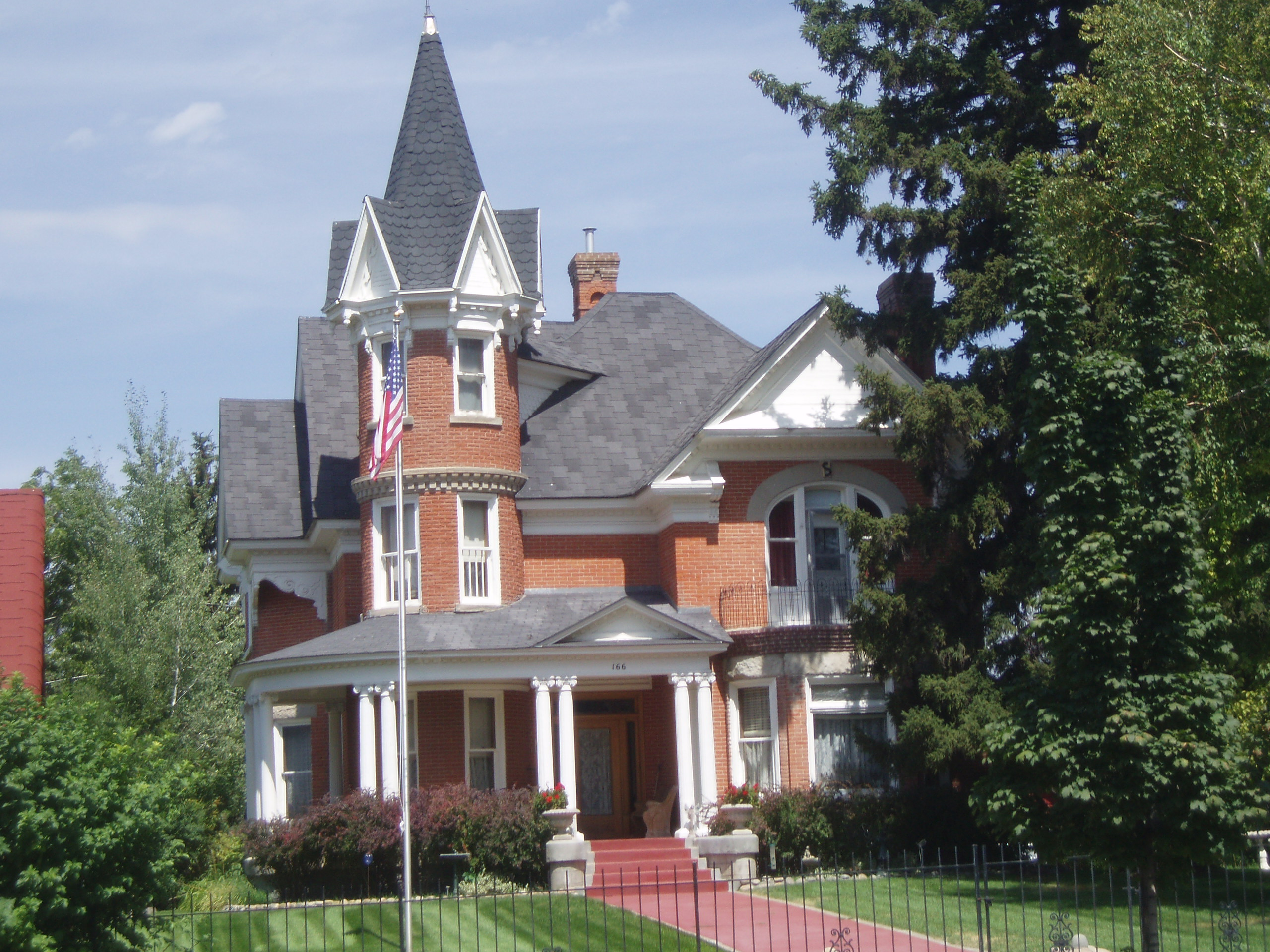

- Location within Utah
- Location: 166 W. Main St., Hyrum, Utah
- Coordinates: 41°38′04″N 111°51′33″W
- Area: less than one acre
- Built: 1905-07
- Architectural style: Queen Anne
- NRHP reference No.: 82004109
- Added to NRHP: February 11, 1982

The Soren Hanson House, a Queen Anne-style house at 166 W. Main St. in Hyrum, Utah, was built in 1905–07. It was listed on the National Register of Historic Places in 1982.

It is a two-and-a-half-story "castle" which was, until 1980 at least, the largest private residence in the city of Hyrum. It was the home of Hyrum-born Soren Hanson, a businessman and mayor of Hyrum in the early 20th century, who at one time was "the largest dealer in eggs in the Intermountain West."
