= Johnson–Hansen House =

Historic house in Utah, United States

- U.S. National Register of Historic Places
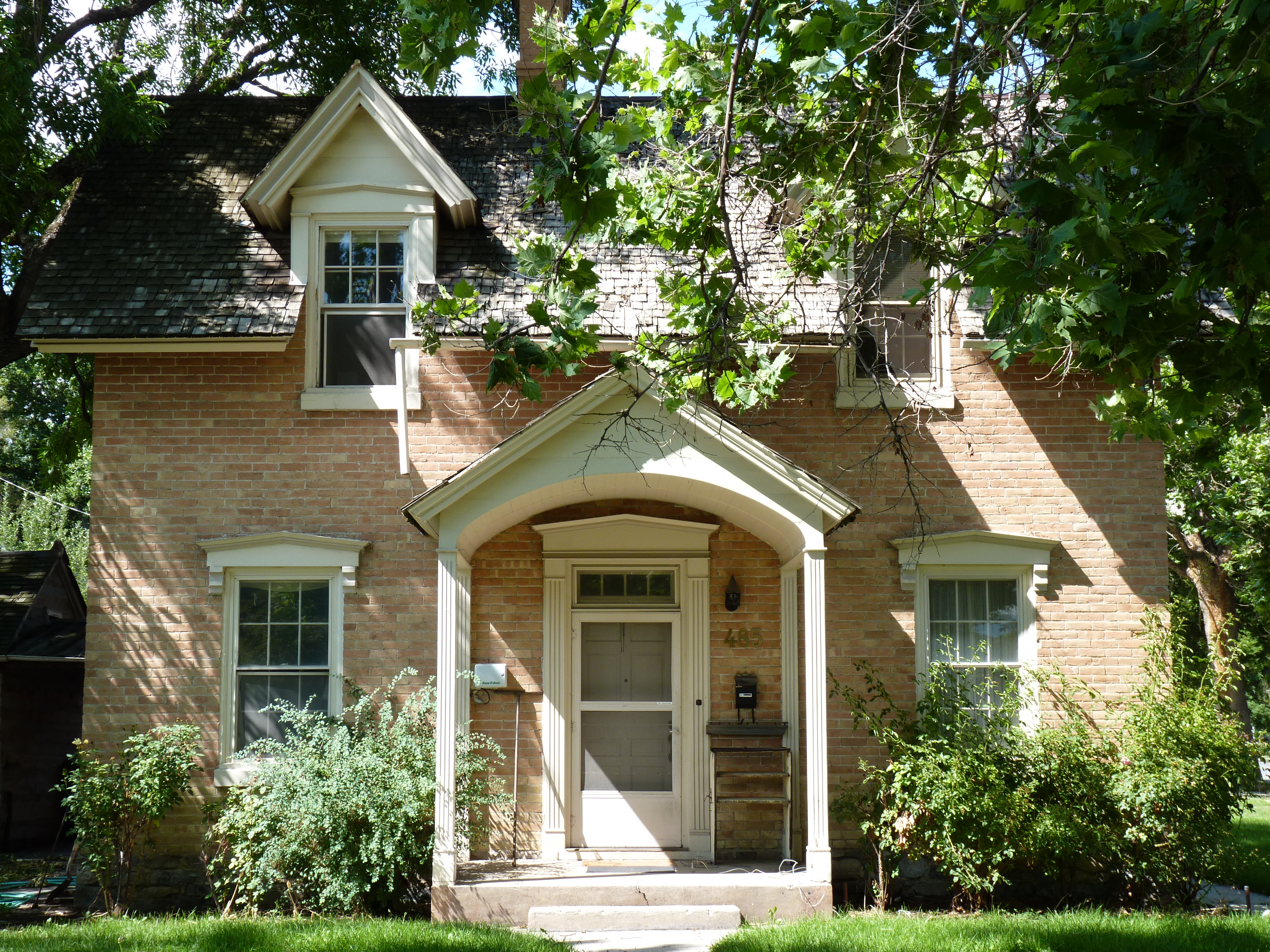
- Johnson-Hansen House, July 2011

- Location within Utah Location within the United States
- Location: 485 East 400 South; Provo, Utah; United States
- Coordinates: 40°13′43″N 111°38′50″W
- Built: 1870
- Architect: Neils Johnson
- Architectural style: Gothic
- NRHP reference No.: 94001346
- Added to NRHP: December 1, 1994

The Johnson–Hansen House is a historic house located in Provo, Utah, United States, that is listed on the National Register of Historic Places.

== Description ==
Located at 485 East 400 South, the Neils Johnson home is both architecturally and historically significant. "The log cabin, brick house, and garage, built between 1870 and 1938, describe settlement patterns and periods of development in Provo. Linking the brick historic home with a "modern" garage through the log cabin symbolizes the connection between past, present, and future. These structures are architecturally significant as excellent examples of local 1870s architecture and as a unique, late 1930s blend of nostalgic and modern influences on residential design (Historic Provo p. 25)."

=== The plat of the City of Zion ===
Provo was first occupied in 1849 when the first fort was built. People began moving outside the fort in 1850-51, and when two canals were dug to irrigate the fields in the 1850s, agriculture was the primary industry. Utah settlement patterns were based on the plat of the City of Zion that was outlined by the Mormon prophet Joseph Smith. The plan, though not fully implemented, served as a model for Mormon settlements across the west under the direction of Brigham Young. The plats were strictly organized, being one mile square, ten acres each and forty rods square, and the lots were laid off alternately within the squares, setting up what were considered to be garden views from the houses. There was to be space for each house to have a small yard in the front, and the houses were to be built primarily of stone and brick. The towns were set out in a grid pattern with the public buildings and church located in the center of town, surrounded by residences, with the outlying areas being used as farmlands. The plat of Zion's design is described in the following:

"As soon as it was considered safe to move out of the fort, instead of making a home on his piece of land as the ordinary pioneer farmer would have done, the Provo settler, following the advice of President Young and the example of the older colony, selected a site and made his home in the platted part of the city. Each family had a quarter of a block -- perhaps more -- on which was the dwelling house... Each morning the farmer and his sons went to their work on the farm, returning to their town home in the evening."

The purpose of combining town and farm life was to provide better protection against the Indians and to provide a greater opportunity for a religious and social life.

=== Niels Johnson and Ray Hansen ===
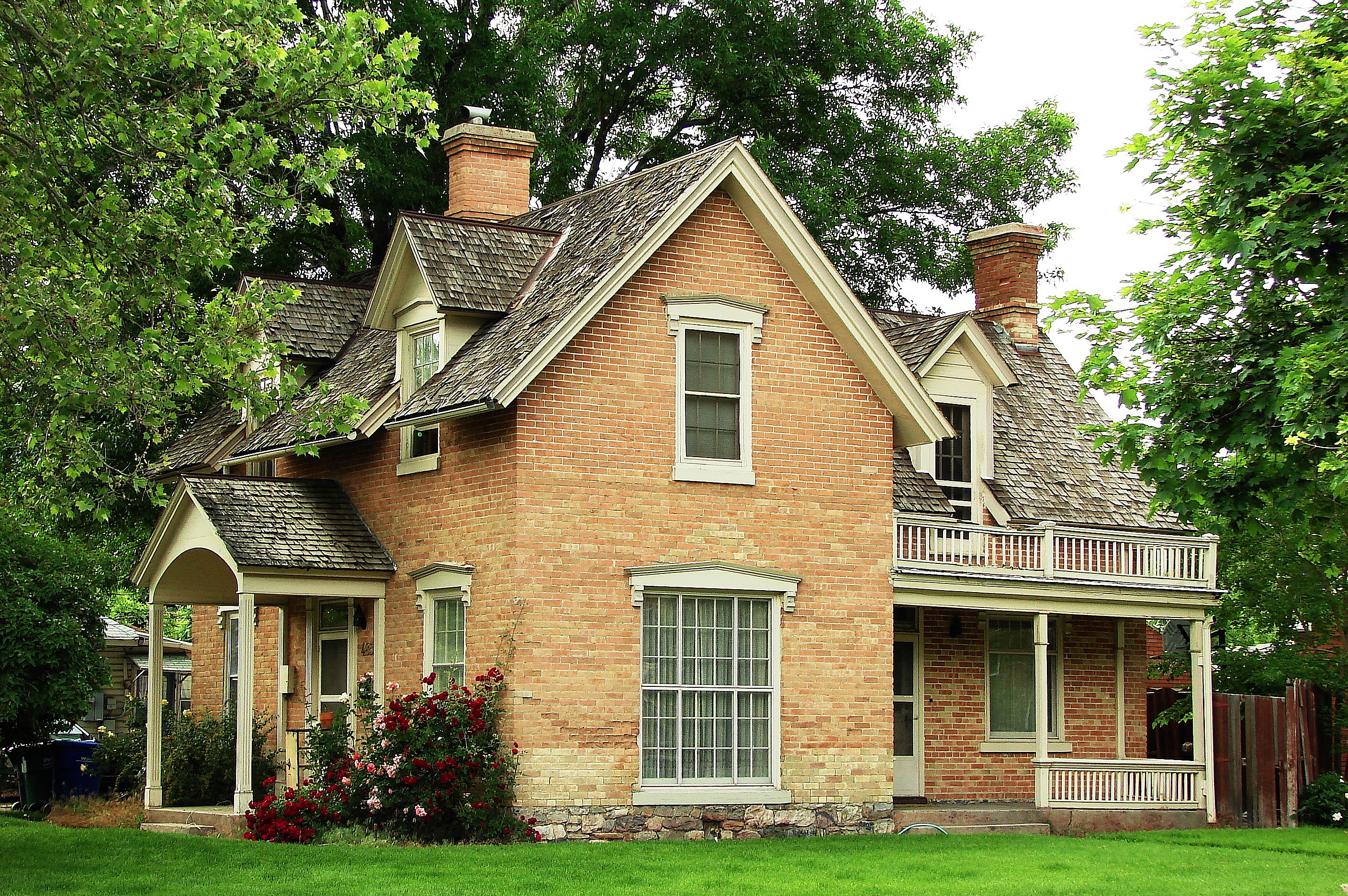
Johnson–Hansen House, June 2009

Born on August 5, 1848, in the country of Denmark, Neils Johnson was both a farmer and a sexton for the city cemetery. He was married to Josephine C.M. who was born in Norway on December 17, 1846. Together they had five children, although three of them died before 1898. Johnson lived in this home between 1871 and 1923, and was listed as residing at 356 South 500 East for four years afterward. Albert L. and Beatrice Hulick resided at the Neils Johnson home between 1926 and 1929, and J. Lanning Hall in 1930–31, but throughout their tenancies Neils Johnson still owned the home. Johnson died in 1937, bestowing the property to his daughter (two-thirds to Caroline Hinckley and one-third to Christine Hinckley Robinson. Mr. Ray Hansen then purchased the home.

Born in Benjamin, Utah, Ray Hansen was born on February 22, 1902. He was married on July 2, 1927, to Blanche Mcbeth, and they lived at 356 South 500 East in Provo before purchasing the Johnson–Hansen property. Ray Hansen was employed under Pacific States CI and P Co., a pipeline manufacturer. In the year 1939 Mr. Hansen became a foreman, and in 1959 a patternmaker for the same company. He married a second time to Helen Hansen, and he died on June 3, 1989.

=== The house today ===
The Johnson–Hansen home is one of four c.1870s houses remaining within this older, tree-lined residential neighborhood that demonstrate the town grid settlement pattern. These older homes are situated on corner lots and appear to have been laid off alternately within quarter sections of the square blocks. The log building remains as physical evidence of the kinds of structures that were built when Provo was originally settled. Ray Hansen used the log cabin as his gunsmith shop for over 50 years. The reasons he moved the log structure to its current location and connected it to his house and a "modern" garage are not known.

The present owners, Dr. and Mrs. M. Gary Hadfield, have carefully rehabilitated the brick house and log cabin since they purchased the home in 1990. The restoration work included the chemical removal of many layers of paint on both buildings. The home is being maintained as a single family residence. The Neils Johnson Home was designated a Provo City Historic Landmark on April 28, 1995. These structures have been well-maintained and retain their historic integrity and association.

== See also ==
- National Register of Historic Places listings in Utah County, Utah
