= Hanson-Downing House =

- U.S. National Register of Historic Places
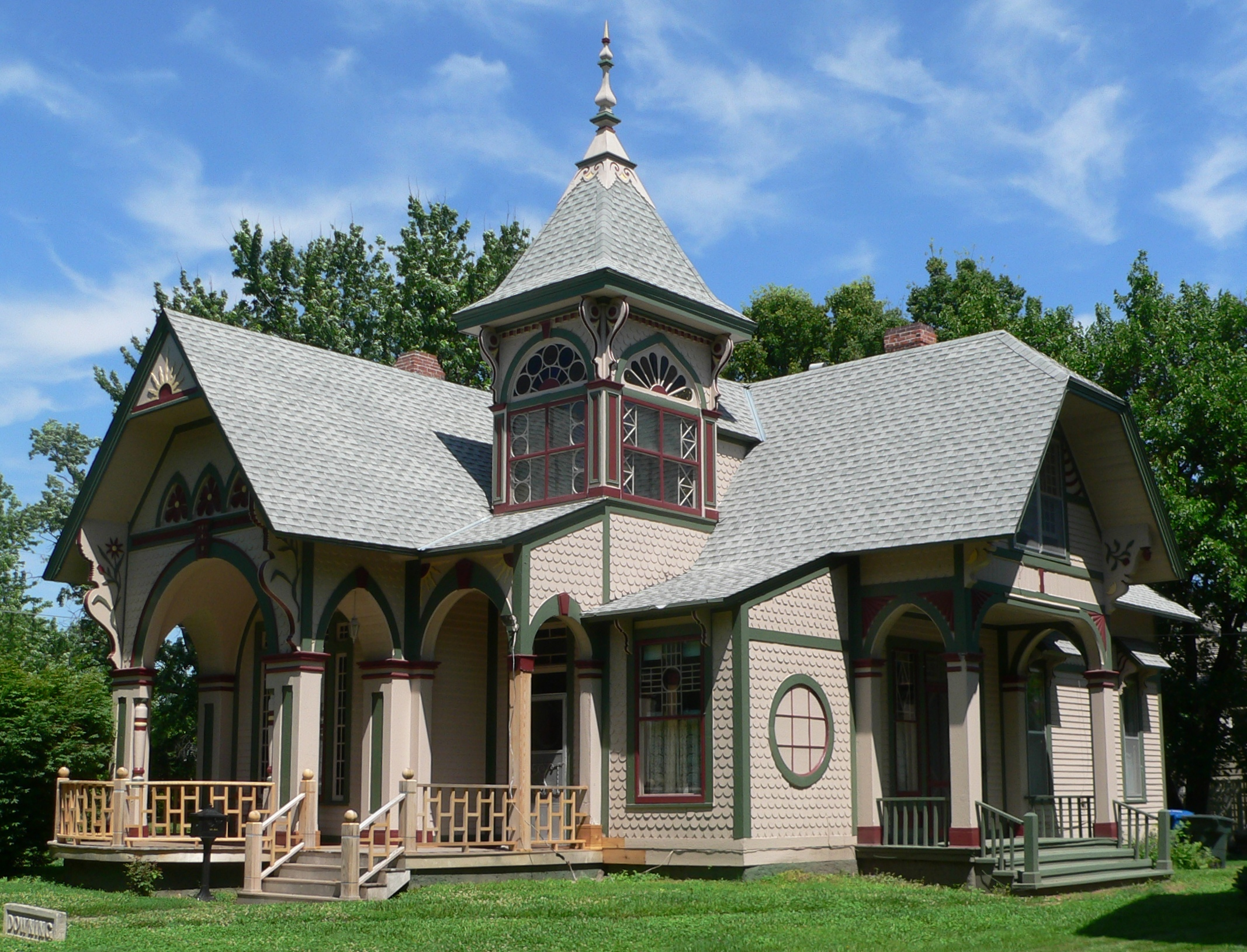
- The house in 2010

- Location within Nebraska Location within the United States
- Location: 723 West 22nd Street, Kearney, Nebraska
- Coordinates: 40°41′53″N 99°05′32″W
- Area: less than one acre
- Built: 1886
- Architectural style: Cottage orne
- NRHP reference No.: 80002440
- Added to NRHP: December 10, 1980

The Hanson-Downing House is a historic house in Kearney, Nebraska. It was built in 1886 as a cottage orné by Charles E. Hanson, a Swedish immigrant. It later belonged to Wallace A. Downing, a businessman in the saddlery and harness industry. Since December 1930, it has housed the Kearney Woman's Club. It has been listed on the National Register of Historic Places since December 10, 1980.
