= Peter Hansen House (Manti, Utah) =

Historic house in Utah, United States

- U.S. National Register of Historic Places
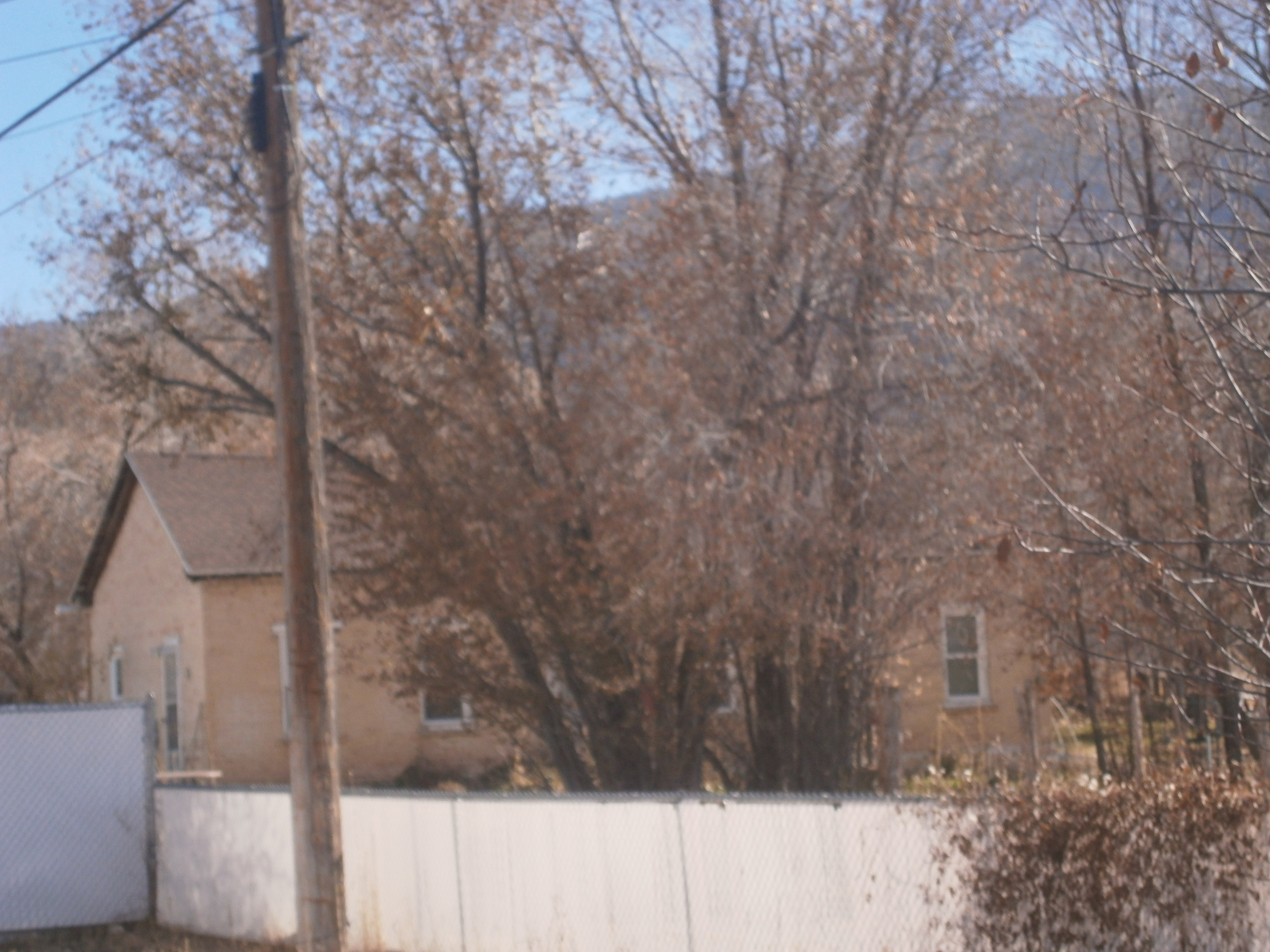
- View from the street is very obscured.

- Location within Utah Location within the United States
- Location: 247 S. 200 East, Manti, Utah
- Coordinates: 39°15′42″N 111°37′56″W
- Area: less than one acre
- Built: 1875
- Built by: Hansen, Peter
- MPS: Scandinavian-American Pair-houses TR
- NRHP reference No.: 83003187
- Added to NRHP: February 1, 1983

The Peter Hansen House, located at 247 S. 200 East in Manti, Utah, was built in 1875. It is historically significant as a Scandinavian-American folk architecture example. It was built by Danish-born brickmason Peter Hansen who immigrated in the 1860s. As brick was rare in Manti before the 1880s, it is believed that Hansen fired bricks for this house in a kiln on the property. The house was sold for $500 in 1882.

It was listed on the National Register of Historic Places in 1983.
