= Peter Hansen House (Pierre, South Dakota) =

Historic house in South Dakota, United States

- U.S. National Register of Historic Places
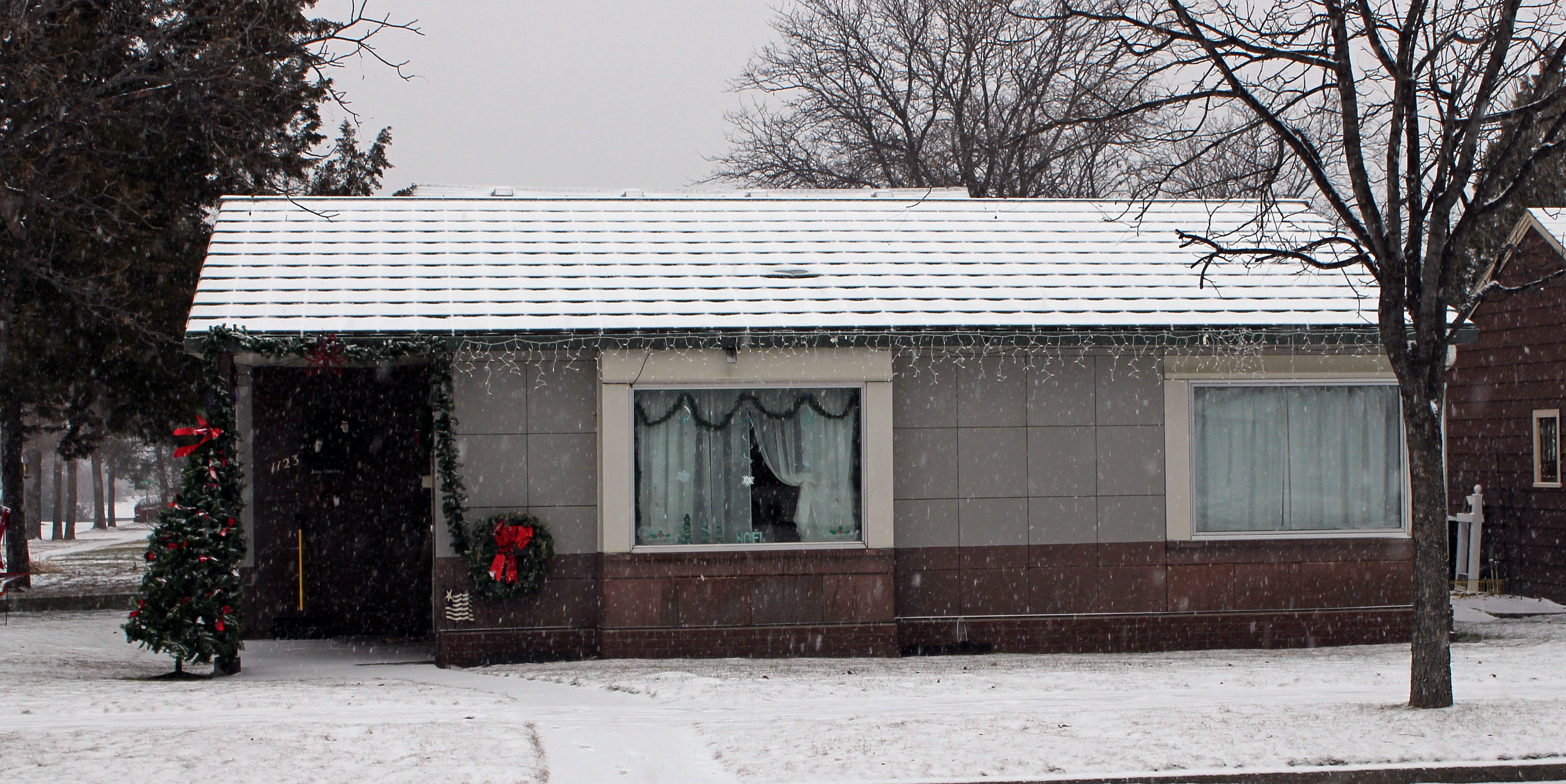

- Location within South Dakota Location within the United States
- Location: 1123 E. Capitol St., Pierre, South Dakota
- Coordinates: 44°22′23″N 100°20′9″W
- Area: less than one acre
- Built: 1949
- Architectural style: Lustron Westchester deluxe
- MPS: Lustron Houses in South Dakota MPS
- NRHP reference No.: 98001410
- Added to NRHP: February 10, 1999

The Peter Hansen House is a Lustron house located at 1123 E. Capitol St. in Pierre, South Dakota. Built in 1949, the house is a Westchester Deluxe model Lustron house, the most popular model of the homes. Lustron houses were steel homes built after World War II to address the housing shortage created by returning soldiers. There are two remaining Lustron houses in Pierre, including the Peter Hansen House, and 38 in South Dakota.

The house was added to the National Register of Historic Places on February 10, 1999.
