= Shelton, Nebraska =

Village in Nebraska, US

- Village
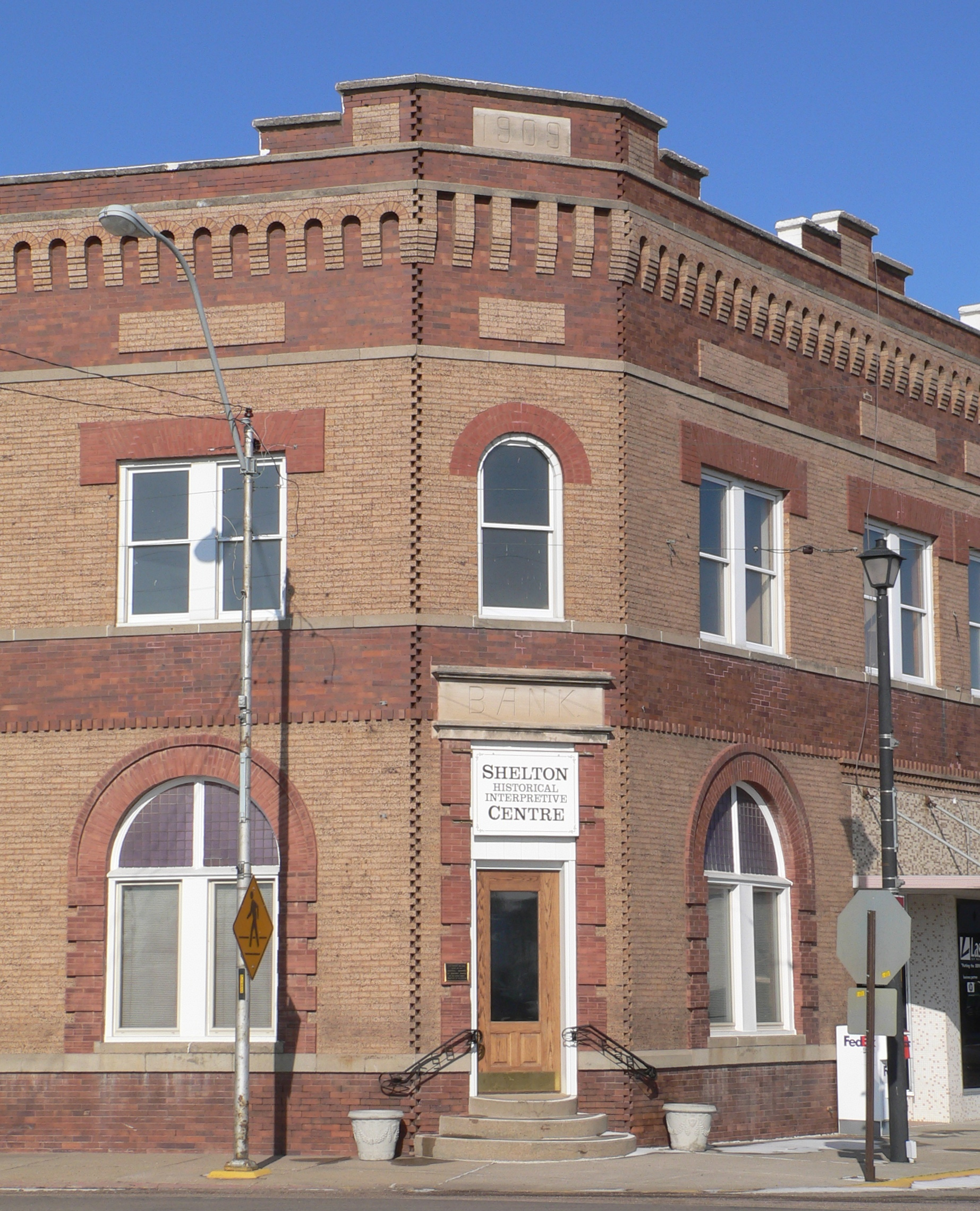
- Shelton Historical Interpretive Centre in Meisner Bank Building

- Location of Shelton, Nebraska
- Coordinates: 40°46′42″N 98°43′46″W
- Country: United States
- State: Nebraska
- Counties: Buffalo, Hall

Area
  - Total: 0.97 sq mi (2.52 km^{2})
  - Land: 0.97 sq mi (2.52 km^{2})
  - Water: 0 sq mi (0.00 km^{2})
- Elevation: 2,018 ft (615 m)

Population (2020)
  - Total: 1,034
  - Density: 1,064.0/sq mi (410.82/km^{2})
- Time zone: UTC-6 (Central (CST))
  - Summer (DST): UTC-5 (CDT)
- ZIP code: 68876
- Area code: 308
- FIPS code: 31-44700
- GNIS feature ID: 2399798
- Website: villageofshelton.com

Shelton is a village in Buffalo and Hall counties, Nebraska, United States. It is part of the Kearney, Nebraska Micropolitan Statistical Area. As of the 2020 census, Shelton had a population of 1,034. It is located west of Grand Island along both the Union Pacific Railroad and U.S. Route 30. Nebraska Link 10-D connects Shelton with Interstate 80.

== Geography ==
According to the United States Census Bureau, the village has a total area of 0.73 square miles (1.89 km^{2}), all land.

The downtown business district is situated near the banks of the Wood River and the historic Lincoln Highway (now U.S. Highway 30) passes through Shelton.

== History ==
Shelton, evolving from Wood River Centre, is one of the older communities in Nebraska. The first European settler to live in the area was a Mormon by the name of Joseph Johnson in 1858. His store, blacksmithery, wagon repair shop, tintype gallery, bakery, place where meals could be obtained, and printing office served early pioneers. The "Huntsman's Echo", his publication, was the first newspaper west of Omaha and was established in April 1860. His establishment (Johnson's Ranche) found itself as an important point of supply serving Mormons and other travelers on the Council Bluffs Road.

Prior to service by the railroad, The Great Western Stage Company established a stage station at Wood River Center in 1860 to serve its Fort Kearny route. The Union Pacific Railroad came to the area in 1866; with additional settlers, the need to establish government was realized. Patrick Walsh, Martin Slattery, and a Sergeant Cody petitioned the governor to organize Buffalo County in 1869. Wood River Centre (Shelton) was selected through election to be the county seat. Within a year, the seat was moved to Gibbon.

Patrick Walsh, the community postman, wrote the Postmaster General in 1873 with the plea to change the name of Wood River Centre to Shelton to avoid confusion with Wood River, a community to the east. The post office name was changed from Wood River Center to Shelton on February 3, 1873. Shelton held the name of Wood River Center from 1860 to about 1873. No further correspondence about the naming of Shelton is recorded. The name, Shelton, is derived from the name of an auditor for the Union Pacific Railroad, Nathan Shelton.

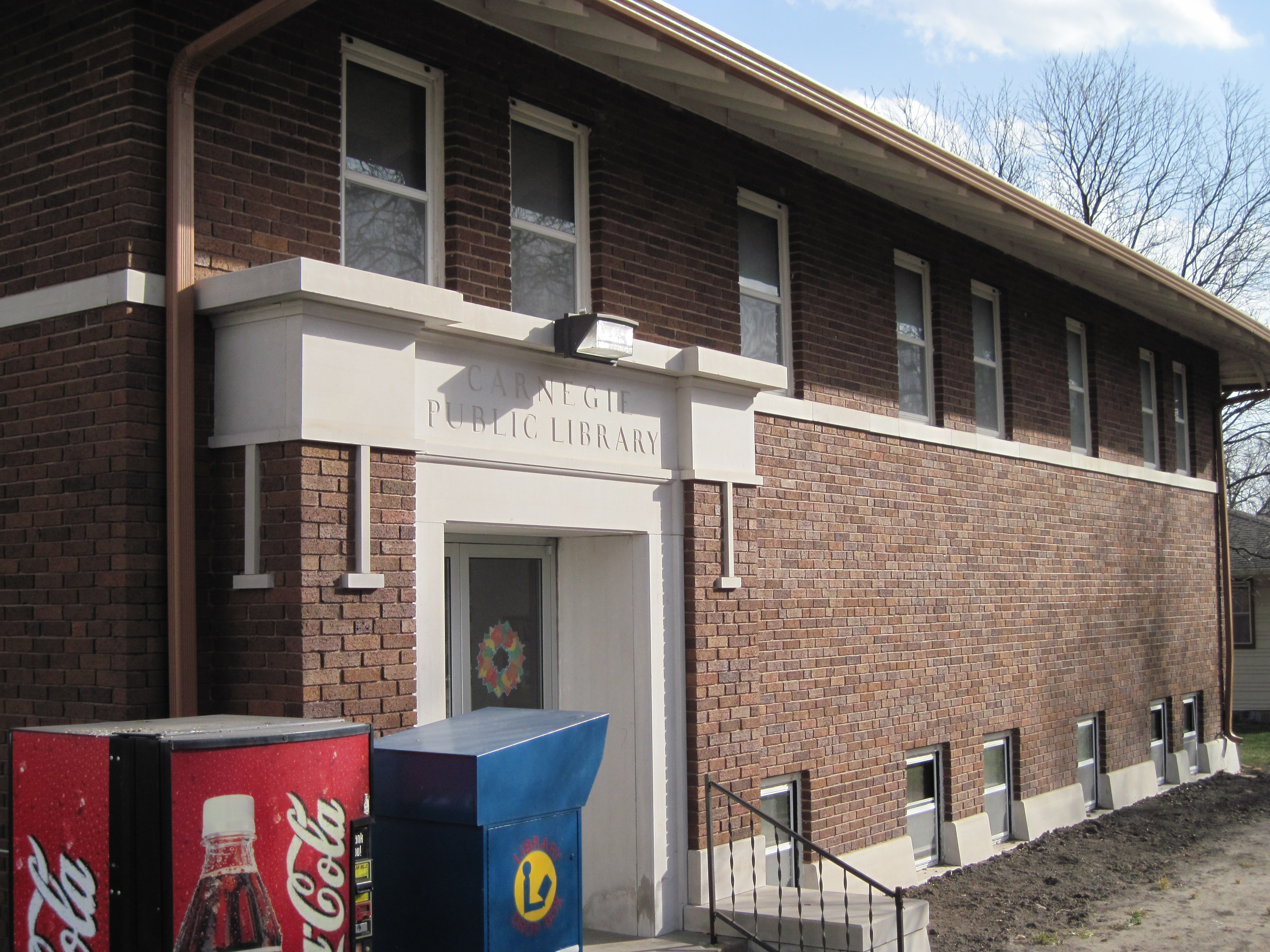
Shelton Township Library, Shelton NE

The original townsite was surveyed from the homestead farm of Patrick Walsh, followed by a survey from the Union Pacific Railway Company. It was 1876 before the Union Pacific established a station. With incorporation in 1882, the community grew and was home to "The Shelton Clipper" formerly "The Shelton Clarion", several banks, and a community school. As early as 1866, people of the Shelton area organized together to form the first schoolhouse in Buffalo County. By 1876, a new school district was organized; it was legally known as No. 19 in Buffalo County. In January 1908, the community library was officially organized as the Shelton Public Library with a village tax being levied for its support. A Carnegie Library building was funded on April 7, 1913.

The population of Shelton has been relatively consistent since its early years, always maintaining a population around 1,000 individuals. The population of Shelton in 1910 was 1,005.

In 1983, Shelton was featured in CBS's On The Road.

== Demographics ==
Historical population
Census	Pop.	Note	%±
1890	706		—
1900	861		22.0%
1910	1,005		16.7%
1920	1,087		8.2%
1930	927		−14.7%
1940	983		6.0%
1950	1,032		5.0%
1960	904		−12.4%
1970	1,028		13.7%
1980	1,046		1.8%
1990	954		−8.8%
2000	1,140		19.5%
2010	1,059		−7.1%
2020	1,034		−2.4%
U.S. Decennial Census

=== 2010 census ===
As of the census of 2010, there were 1,059 people, 391 households, and 283 families living in the village. The population density was 1,450.7 inhabitants per square mile (560.1/km^{2}). There were 442 housing units at an average density of 605.5 per square mile (233.8/km^{2}). The racial makeup of the village was 85.6% White, 0.5% African American, 0.6% Native American, 12.1% from other races, and 1.2% from two or more races. Hispanic or Latino of any race were 18.4% of the population.

There were 391 households, of which 43.0% had children under the age of 18 living with them, 58.3% were married couples living together, 10.2% had a female householder with no husband present, 3.8% had a male householder with no wife present, and 27.6% were non-families. 25.1% of all households were made up of individuals, and 12.3% had someone living alone who was 65 years of age or older. The average household size was 2.71 and the average family size was 3.23.

The median age in the village was 34.7 years. 31.5% of residents were under the age of 18; 6.5% were between the ages of 18 and 24; 24.6% were from 25 to 44; 25.5% were from 45 to 64; and 11.8% were 65 years of age or older. The gender makeup of the village was 50.1% male and 49.9% female.

=== 2000 census ===
As of the census of 2000, there were 1,140 people, 425 households, and 308 families living in the village. The population density was 1,551.5 inhabitants per square mile (599.0/km^{2}). There were 460 housing units at an average density of 626.0 per square mile (241.7/km^{2}). The racial makeup of the village was 87.98% White, 0.79% African American, 0.26% Native American, 10.18% from other races, and 0.79% from two or more races. Hispanic or Latino of any race were 16.67% of the population.

There were 425 households, out of which 38.6% had children under the age of 18 living with them, 61.9% were married couples living together, 7.1% had a female householder with no husband present, and 27.3% were non-families. 24.9% of all households were made up of individuals, and 13.2% had someone living alone who was 65 years of age or older. The average household size was 2.68 and the average family size was 3.18.

The median age in Shelton was 35 years. The age distribution was: 31.4% under the age of 18, 5.4% from 18 to 24, 29.1% from 25 to 44, 19.2% from 45 to 64, and 14.8% aged 65 years or older. For every 100 females, there were 93.2 males. For every 100 females age 18 and over, there were 89.3 males.

As of 2000 the median income for a household in the village was $37,583, and the median income for a family was $42,381. Males had a median income of $28,864 versus $20,972 for females. The per capita income for the village was $16,232. About 7.2% of families and 12.1% of the population were below the poverty line, including 15.5% of those under age 18 and 13.5% of those age 65 or over.
