= Hastings micropolitan area, Nebraska =

Hastings micropolitan area
- Micropolitan statistical area
- Hastings, NE Micropolitan Statistical Area
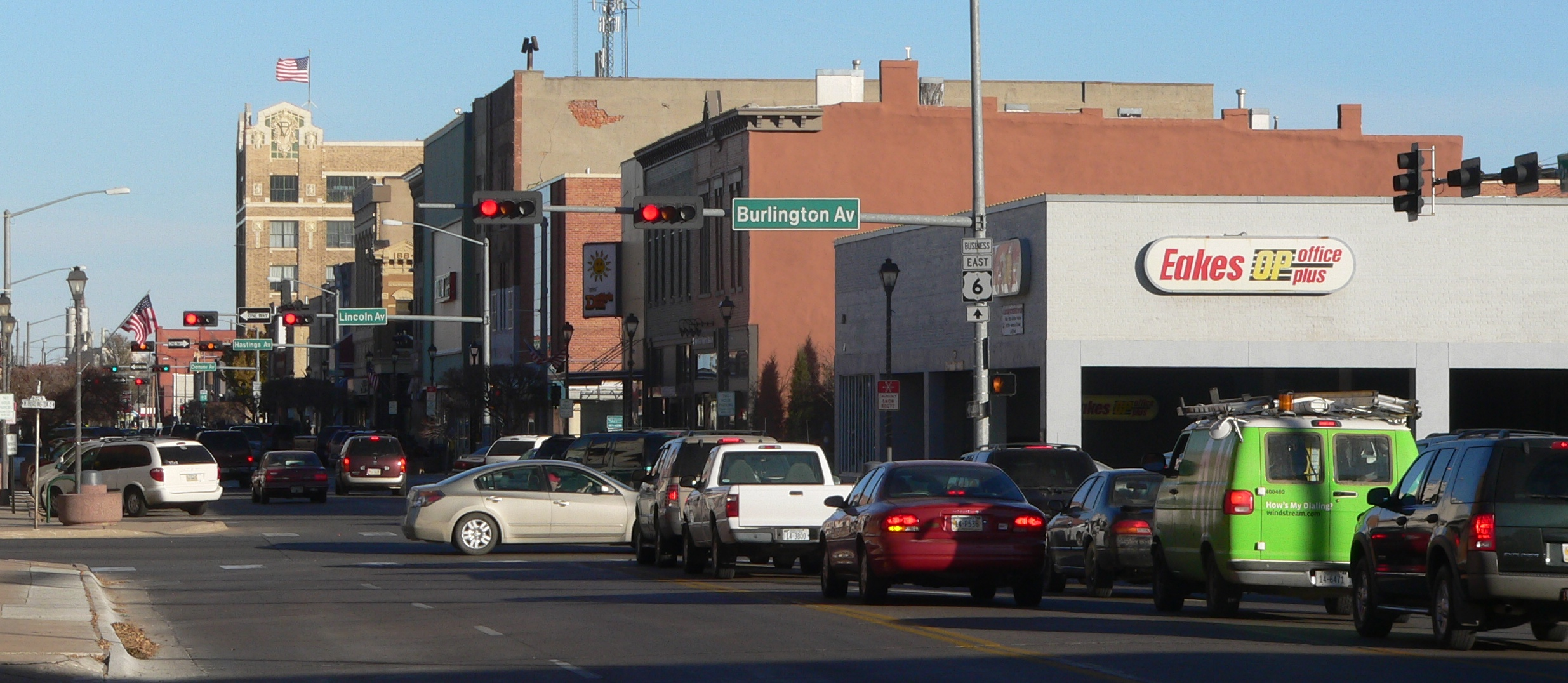
- Downtown Hastings: 2nd Street, looking eastward, November 2012
Interactive Map of Hastings, NE μSA
City of Hastings
Hastings, NE μSA
- Country: United States
- State: Nebraska
- Largest city: Hastings
- Time zone: UTC−6 (CST)
  - Summer (DST): UTC−5 (CDT)

The Hastings micropolitan statistical area, as defined by the United States Census Bureau, is an area consisting of two counties in Nebraska, anchored by the city of Hastings.

As of the 2000 census, the μSA had a population of 38,190 (though a July 1, 2009 estimate placed the population at 39,529).

== Counties ==
- Adams
- Clay
- Webster

== Communities ==
- Places with 20,000 or more inhabitants
  - Hastings (Principal City)
- Places with 1,000 to 2,500 inhabitants
  - Sutton
- Places with 500 to 1,000 inhabitants
  - Clay Center
  - Edgar
  - Harvard
  - Juniata
  - Kenesaw
- Places with less than 500 inhabitants
  - Ayr
  - Deweese
  - Fairfield
  - Glenvil
  - Holstein
  - Ong
  - Prosser
  - Roseland
  - Saronville
  - Trumbull

== Townships ==
- Ayr
- Blaine
- Cottonwood
- Denver
- Edgar
- Eldorado
- Fairfield
- Glenvil
- Hanover
- Harvard
- Highland
- Inland
- Juniata
- Kenesaw
- Leicester
- Lewis

- Little Blue
- Logan (Adams County)
- Logan (Clay County)
- Lone Tree
- Lynn
- Marshall
- Roseland
- School Creek
- Sheridan
- Silver Lake
- Spring Ranch
- Sutton
- Verona
- Wanda
- West Blue
- Zero

== Demographics ==
As of the census of 2000, there were 38,190 people, 14,897 households, and 9,945 families residing within the μSA. The racial makeup of the μSA was 95.10% White, 0.56% African American, 0.35% Native American, 1.36% Asian, 0.03% Pacific Islander, 1.85% from other races, and 0.75% from two or more races. Hispanic or Latino of any race were 4.38% of the population.

The median income for a household in the μSA was $35,710, and the median income for a family was $42,581. Males had a median income of $29,082 versus $20,553 for females. The per capita income for the μSA was $17,589.

== See also ==
- Nebraska census statistical areas
