= Nebraska Highway 74 =

State highway in Nebraska, U.S.

State Highway 74

Route information
- Maintained by NDOT
- Length: 97.71 mi (157.25 km)
- Existed: 1935–present

Major junctions
- West end: N-10 in Minden
- US 281 east of Ayr; N-14 east of Fairfield; US 81 south of Geneva
- East end: N-15 east of Tobias

Location
- Country: United States
- State: Nebraska
- Counties: Kearney, Adams, Clay, Fillmore, Saline

Highway system
- Nebraska State Highway System; Interstate; US; State; Link; Spur; State Spurs; Recreation
← US 73	→ US 75

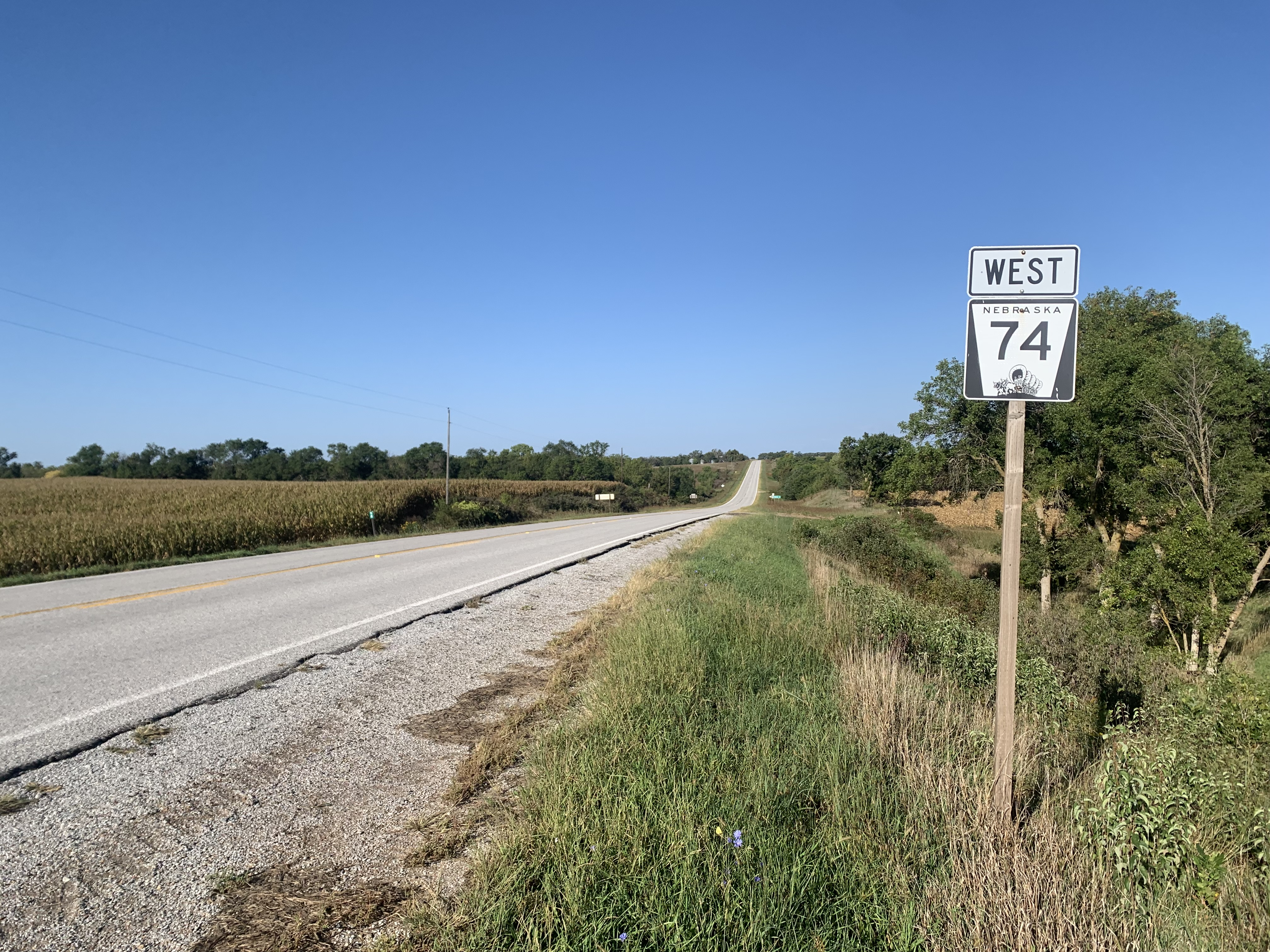
Nebraska Highway 74 in Saline County, Nebraska

Nebraska Highway 74 is a highway in southern Nebraska. Its western terminus is at an intersection with Nebraska Highway 10 in Minden. Its eastern terminus is at an intersection with Nebraska Highway 15 east of Tobias.

== Route description ==
Nebraska Highway 74 begins in Minden at an intersection with NE 10. It leaves Minden heading in an eastward orientation into farmland, turning periodically to the south before passing through Norman and Holstein. East of Holstein, the highway passes through Roseland before turning to the south and east again. After passing through Ayr, NE 74 intersects with US 281 and runs concurrently with it for just over a mile. After US 281 turns to the north, NE 74 will continue eastward, passing through Fairfield and the Army National Guard Training Site to the northwest of Fairfield.

East of Fairfield, the highway meets NE 14 and runs concurrently southward with it for a mile before splitting off to the east again. NE 74 will pass through Shickley as it heads eastward. Further east, it intersects with US 81 south of Geneva. Continuing to the east, the highway passes through Tobias. After leaving Tobias, it continues east to NE 15 which is where it terminates.

== Major intersections ==
County	Location	mi	km	Destinations	Notes
Kearney	Minden	0.00	0.00	N-10 (Brown Avenue)	Western terminus; road continues as 1st Street
Kearney	Lincoln Township	1.00	1.61	Truck Route to N-10 north / US 6 / US 34	Access via 33 Road
Adams	Zero–Ayr township line	30.53	49.13	US 281 south – Red Cloud	Western end of US 281 overlap
Adams	Zero–Ayr township line	31.89– 32.21	51.32– 51.84	US 281 north – Hastings	Eastern end of US 281 overlap
Clay	Spring Ranch–Glenvil township line	39.66	63.83	S-18E north – Glenvil	
Clay	Fairfield–Edgar–Marshall–Lone Tree township quadpoint	50.68	81.56	N-14 north – Clay Center	Western end of N-14 overlap
Clay	Fairfield–Edgar township line	51.68	83.17	N-14 south – Superior	Eastern end of N-14 overlap
Clay	Logan Township	62.67	100.86	S-18F south – Ong	
Fillmore	Shickley	68.99	111.03	S-30B south – Shickley	
Fillmore	Hamilton–Belle Prairie township line	75.69	121.81	US 81 – Hebron, York	
Fillmore	Belle Prairie Township	76.19	122.62	S-30D south – Strang	
Fillmore	Franklin Township	83.26	133.99	S-30C south – Ohiowa	
Saline	South Fork Township	97.71	157.25	N-15 – Seward, Fairbury	Eastern terminus; road continues unpaved as County Road T
1.000 mi = 1.609 km; 1.000 km = 0.621 mi: Concurrency terminus

== See also ==
- List of state highways in Nebraska
