= List of Nebraska Connecting Link, Spur, and Recreation Highways =

- Standard route shields

Highway names
- Interstates: Interstate X (I-X)
- US Highways: U.S. Route X (US-X)
- State: Highway X (N-X)
- Link: Link L-XY (L-XY)
- Spur: Spur S-XY (S-XY)
- Recreation Road: Recreation Road R-XY (R-XY)

System links
- Nebraska State Highway System; Interstate; US; State; Link; Spur; State Spurs; Recreation

Nebraska Connecting Link, Nebraska Spur, and Nebraska Recreation Road highways are a secondary part of the Nebraska highway system. They connect small towns and state parks to the primary Nebraska highway system. All of these highways are maintained by the Nebraska Department of Transportation.

A connecting link, or simply a link, highway connects two primary highways. A spur highway is a highway which goes from a primary highway to a city or state park not on any other highway. A recreation road is a road in a state park, which is designated as such by the Nebraska Game and Parks Commission, though maintained by NDOT.

Highways are generally marked in the format of S-x-Y or L-x-Y, where S or L indicates whether it is a spur or a link, x is the county the highway is in, with ranking in alphabetical order (1 is Adams County, while 93 is York County), and Y is the letter which "numbers" the highway. Recreation Roads are typically unsigned.

== History ==
In 1955, the Nebraska Legislature passed a law requiring all incorporated communities with a population over 100 to be included in the state highway system. The original numbering system required placing a single digit in front of the highway number it was connecting with. In 1971, the system was changed to the current system.

== Connecting Links ==
| Number | Length (mi) | Length (km) | Southern or western terminus | Northern or eastern terminus | Counties | Formed | Removed | Notes |
|---|---|---|---|---|---|---|---|---|
| L-1E | 0.21 | 0.34 | US 281 east of Ayr | N-74 east of Ayr | Adams | 1971 | current | Unsigned turning lane |
| L-2C | — | — | N-14 east of Royal | US 20 east of Royal | Antelope | c. 1971 | 1996 | demolished |
| L-6A | 0.10 | 0.16 | N-14 southeast of Albion | N-39 southeast of Albion | Boone | 1971 | current | Turning lane from N-14 to N-39; may be the shortest signed highway in Nebraska |
| L-7E | 10.27 | 16.53 | N-2 in Hemingford | N-87 east of Hemingford | Box Butte | 2000 | current | Formerly an alignment of N-87; segment east of US 385 previously a segment of US 385 |
| L-10B | 1.98 | 3.19 | I-80 south of Odessa | US 30 south of Odessa | Buffalo | 1971 | current | |
| L-10C | 3.89 | 6.26 | I-80 south of Gibbon | US 30 south of Gibbon | Buffalo | 1971 | current | |
| L-10D | 3.99 | 6.42 | I-80 south of Shelton | US 30 south of Shelton | Buffalo | 1971 | current | |
| L-10E | 0.30 | 0.48 | US 30 in Elm Creek | US 183 in Elm Creek | Buffalo | — | — | Turning lane from US 30 to US 183 |
| L-10F | 0.54 | 0.87 | US 30 east of Kearney | N-10 east of Kearney | Buffalo | 2016 | current | Allows access between US 30 and the new East Kearney Bypass, N-10 |
| L-14D | 0.46 | 0.74 | N-15/N-59 north of Laurel | US 20 north of Laurel | Cedar | 1971 | 2015 | |
| L-17B | 0.72 | 1.16 | I-80 south of Potter | US 30 in Potter | Cheyenne | 1971 | current | |
| L-17C | 1.07 | 1.72 | I-80 southwest of Brownson | US 30 southwest of Brownson | Cheyenne | 1971 | current | |
| L-17D | — | — | I-80 south of Sidney | US 30 in Sidney | Cheyenne | 1971 | 1984 | Replaced by a rerouted N-19 |
| L-17E | 3.05 | 4.91 | I-80 south of Sunol | US 30 south of Sunol | Cheyenne | 1971 | current | |
| L-17F | 2.31 | 3.72 | I-80 south of Lodgepole | US 30 in Lodgepole | Cheyenne | 1971 | current | |
| L-17J | 2.43 | 3.91 | I-80 in Sidney | US 30 in Sidney | Cheyenne | 1971 | current | |
| L-20A | 5.37 | 8.64 | N-51 in Beemer | US 275 north of Beemer | Cuming | 1971 | current | Former Spur 151 |
| L-22A | — | — | US 20 west of South Sioux City | US 77 north of South Sioux City | Dakota | 1971 | 1979 | Decommissioned when US 20 was rerouted on I-129 and US 75 was rerouted over the South Sioux City bypass |
| L-23D | 0.26 | 0.42 | US 20 west of Chadron | US 385 west of Chadron | Dawes | 1971 | current | Turning lane from US 385 to US 20 |
| L-24A | 1.80 | 2.90 | I-80 west of Lexington | US 30 west of Lexington | Dawson | 1971 | current | |
| L-24B | 3.88 | 6.24 | I-80 south of Overton | US 30 in Overton | Dawson | 1971 | current | |
| L-24D | 0.28 | 0.45 | US 30 in Gothenburg | N-47 in Gothenburg | Dawson | 1971 | current | Follows Avenue D, then 11th Street in Gothenburg |
| L-25A | 0.63 | 1.01 | I-80 south of Chappell | US 385 in Chappell | Deuel | 1971 | current | |
| L-25B | 1.10 | 1.77 | I-80 south of Big Springs | US 138 in Big Springs | Deuel | 1971 | current | |
| L-25C | — | — | US 138 north of Big Springs | US 30 north of Big Springs | Deuel | 1971 | 1999 | Demolished when US 30/US 138 intersection was redone |
| L-26D | 0.35 | 0.56 | S-26B near Concord | N-116 near Concord | Dixon | 1971 | 2002 | Demolished when intersection was redone |
| L-28B | 3.39 | 5.46 | US 275 south of Waterloo | US 6/N-31 in Elkhorn | Douglas | 1971 | current | Highway is freeway for entire length. |
| L-28D | 0.25 | 0.40 | US 275 south of Waterloo | L-28B south of Waterloo | Douglas | 1971 | 2006 | Decommissioned when L-28B was converted to a freeway |
| L-28E | 0.53 | 0.85 | N-92 south of Waterloo | US 275 south of Waterloo | Douglas | 1971 | current | Highway marked as West N-92 westbound and West US 275 eastbound |
| L-28G | 0.23 | 0.37 | US 275 south of Waterloo | L-28D south of Waterloo | Douglas | 1971 | 2006 | Decommissioned when L-28B was converted to a freeway |
| L-28H | 0.25 | 0.40 | US 75 in Omaha | I-680 in Omaha | Douglas | 1971 | current | 31st Street in Omaha |
| L-28K | 3.36 | 5.41 | N-64 in Omaha | N-133 in Omaha | Douglas | 1976 | current | From west to east, follows Blair High Road, Military Road, and Northwest Radial Highway in Omaha |
| L-30E | 1.20 | 1.93 | US 81 in Fairmont | US 6 in Fairmont | Fillmore | 1971 | 2001 | demolished when US 81 was widened to four lanes |
| L-30F | 0.36 | 0.58 | N-74 in Strang | US 81 in Strang | Fillmore | 1971 | 2002 | demolished when US 81 was widened to four lanes |
| L-30G | 0.36 | 0.58 | US 81 in Strang | N-74 in Strang | Fillmore | 1971 | 2002 | demolished when US 81 was widened to four lanes |
| L-31D | 1.20 | 1.93 | US 136 west of Franklin | N-10 in Franklin | Franklin | 1971 | current | |
| L-34F | — | — | US 136 southwest of Beatrice | US 77 south of Beatrice | Gage | 1971 | 1994 | Now Locust Road |
| L-34G | — | — | US 77 | N-41 | Gage | — | 1994 | eliminated when the junction was redone |
| L-34H | 0.31 | 0.50 | N-112 west of Blue Springs | US 77 west of Blue Springs | Gage | 1971 | current | Turning lane from N-112 to US 77; unsigned |
| L-36A | — | — | N-91 near Burwell | N-11 near Burwell | Garfield | 1971 | 1991 | demolished |
| L-40C | 5.60 | 9.01 | I-80 south of Alda | US 30 in Alda | Hall | 1971 | current | |
| L-40G | 0.36 | 0.58 | US 30 in Wood River | N-11 in Wood River | Hall | 2013 | current | Established in 2013 when N-11 was rerouted over US 30, rather than being concurrent with it. |
| L-41D | 0.54 | 0.87 | I-80 south of Hampton | US 34 in Hampton | Hamilton | 1971 | current | |
| L-44C | 0.81 | 1.30 | US 6 west of Culbertson | US 6/US 34 west of Culbertson | Hitchcock | 1971 | current | Connector ramp from US 6 to US 6/US 34 |
| L-45B | 5.74 | 9.24 | US 275 in of Ewing | US 20 north of Ewing | Holt | 1971 | current | Former Spur 420 |
| L-50A | 7.01 | 11.28 | N-44 west of Newark | N-10 east of Newark | Kearney | 1971 | current | Access road to Fort Kearny State Historical Park |
| L-51A | 1.10 | 1.77 | I-80 south of Brule | US 30 in Brule | Keith | 1971 | current | |
| L-51B | 1.00 | 1.61 | I-80 southeast of Roscoe | US 30 east of Roscoe | Keith | 1971 | current | |
| L-51C | 1.05 | 1.69 | I-80 south of Paxton | US 30 in Paxton | Keith | 1971 | current | |
| L-53A | 1.12 | 1.80 | I-80 south of Dix | US 30 in Dix | Kimball | 1973 | current | |
| L-53B | 0.41 | 0.66 | I-80 east of Pine Bluffs, Wyoming | US 30 east Pine Bluffs, Wyoming | Kimball | 1971 | current | Highway contains a portion of Business Loop 80 |
| L-53C | 2.72 | 4.38 | I-80 south of Bushnell | US 30 in Bushnell | Kimball | 1971 | current | |
| L-53D | — | — | US 30 east of Kimball | Potter | Kimball | 1974 | 1978 | replaced by relocated US 30 |
| L-53E | 0.40 | 0.64 | N-71 east of Kimball | US 30 in Kimball | Kimball | 1973 | current | |
| L-55K | 0.70 | 1.13 | US 6 in Lincoln | Reentering Lincoln City Limits | Lancaster | 1971 | current | Includes interchange with I-80; despite designation, behaves more like a spur. |
| L-55L | — | — | I-80 in Lincoln | I-180/US 34 in Lincoln | Lancaster | 1971 | 1984 | Former Spur 434; now Cornhusker Highway |
| L-55W | 2.28 | 3.67 | US 77 in Lincoln | N-2 in Lincoln | Lancaster | 1992 | 2022 | Turned over to the city during the building of the Lincoln South Beltway and rerouting of N-2 |
| L-55X | 2.67 | 4.30 | US 6 in Lincoln | I-80/US 77 in Lincoln | Lancaster | 1992 | current | |
| L-56C | 1.98 | 3.19 | I-80 south of Hershey | US 30 in Hershey | Lincoln | 1971 | current | |
| L-56D | 2.27 | 3.65 | I-80 south of Brady | US 30 in Brady | Lincoln | 1971 | current | |
| L-56G | 2.02 | 3.25 | I-80 in North Platte | US 30 in North Platte | Lincoln | 1984 | current | Commemorative name of "Twist" Newberry Access Highway |
| L-59B | 0.35 | 0.56 | N-45 north of Newman Grove | N-32 north of Newman Grove | Madison | 1971 | current | Part of N-32/N-45 junction |
| L-61D | 0.18 | 0.29 | US 30 southwest of Clarks | N-92 southwest of Clarks | Merrick | 1971 | current | Part of US 30/N-92 junction; unsigned |
| L-62A | 9.08 | 14.61 | US 26 north of Bayard | US 385 north of Bridgeport | Morrill | 1971 | current | |
| L-63A | 3.11 | 5.01 | N-39 north of Genoa | N-22 north of Genoa | Nance | 1971 | current | |
| L-64D | — | — | N-105 south of Johnson | US 136 south of Johnson | Nemaha | 1971 | 1996 | Demolished when the intersection was redone |
| L-67E | 0.25 | 0.40 | N-50 west of Table Rock | N-4 west of Table Rock | Pawnee | 1971 | current | Part of N-4/N-50 junction; unsigned |
| L-67F | — | — | N-50 north of Pawnee City | N-65 north of Pawnee City | Pawnee | — | — | |
| L-67G | — | — | N-8 in Pawnee City | N-65 in Pawnee City | Pawnee | — | — | demolished |
| L-71D | — | — | US 81 in Columbus | US 30 in Columbus | Platte | 1971 | 1992 | Replaced by relocated US 81; the old location of US 81 is now Howard Boulevard |
| L-71E | — | — | US 30 near Columbus | US 81 near Columbus | Platte | 1971 | 1986 | now an access road; partially demolished |
| L-76E | 0.93 | 1.50 | N-33 in Dorchester | US 6/N-15 north of Dorchester | Saline | 1971 | current | Shortcut for US 6/N-15/N-33 junction |
| L-79C | — | — | US 26 in Henry | N-92 in Lyman | Scotts Bluff | — | 1986 | Now Holloway Road / County Road 2 |
| L-79D | — | — | US 26 in Morrill | N-92 | Scotts Bluff | 1971 | 1986 | Former Spur 226; now Morrill Road / County Road 8 |
| L-79E | 2.14 | 3.44 | N-92 west of Minatare | US 26 in Melbeta | Scotts Bluff | 1971 | current | |
| L-79G | 2.13 | 3.43 | N-92 west of Scottsbluff | N-71 in Scottsbluff | Scotts Bluff | 1986 | 2004 | Replaced by rerouted N-92 (old route is now Old Oregon Trail) |
| L-80E | 11.72 | 18.86 | US 6 in Friend | I-80 north of Beaver Crossing | Saline, Seward | 1982 | current | Highway extends into Saline County and also serves Beaver Crossing; originally continued north to US 34 |
| L-80F | 5.70 | 9.17 | I-80 south of Utica | US 34 in Utica | Seward | 1971 | current | |
| L-80G | 5.65 | 9.09 | I-80 south of Goehner | US 34 north of Tamora | Seward | 1971 | current | |
| L-80H | 0.68 | 1.09 | US 6 north of Milford | I-80 north of Milford | Seward | 1971 | current | Provides access from I-80 to US 6 |
| L-82A | 3.01 | 4.84 | N-10 east of Hazard | N-68 west of Rockville | Sherman | 1971 | current | |
| L-85F | 0.60 | 0.97 | US 81 southwest of Hebron | US 136 southwest of Hebron | Thayer | 1971 | current | Provides access from US 81 to US 136 |
| L-91D | 0.25 | 0.40 | N-4 south of Blue Hill | US 281 south of Blue Hill | Webster | 1971 | 2002 | demolished |
| L-93B | 5.62 | 9.04 | I-80 south of Waco | US 34 in Waco | York | 1971 | current | |
| L-93E | 4.68 | 7.53 | I-80 south of Waco | US 34 west of York | York | 1971 | 2010 | decommissioned between 2008 and 2010; now Road H |
Former

== Spurs ==
| Number | Length (mi) | Length (km) | Southern or western terminus | Northern or eastern terminus | Counties | Formed | Removed | Notes |
|---|---|---|---|---|---|---|---|---|
| S-1A | 3.01 | 4.84 | US 6 / US 34 south of Kenesaw | Kenesaw | Adams | 1971 | current | Former Spur 206 |
| S-1B | 1.01 | 1.63 | US 6 / US 34 south of Juniata | Juniata | Adams | 1971 | current | Former Spur 306 |
| S-1C | 1.15 | 1.85 | US 6 / US 34 west of Hastings | Hastings Correctional Center | Adams | 1971 | current | Former Spur 406 |
| S-1D | 5.46 | 8.79 | US 34 / US 281 west of Trumbull | Trumbull | Adams | 1971 | current | Former Spur 134 |
| S-2B | 0.51 | 0.82 | Brunswick | US 20 north of Brunswick | Antelope | 1971 | current | Former Spur 520 |
| S-4A | 4.08 | 6.57 | Harrisburg | N-71 east of Harrisburg | Banner | 1971 | current | Former Spur 129 |
| S-5A | 0.1 | 0.16 | Dunning | N-2 east of Dunning | Blaine | 1971 | current | |
| S-7A | 6.2 | 10.0 | N-87/US 385 | Box Butte-Garden county line | Box Butte | 1971 | 2000 | decommissioned when US 385 was rerouted to no longer intersect; now Dodge Road |
| S-8A | 0.24 | 0.39 | N-12 south of Naper | Naper | Boyd | 1971 | current | |
| S-9A | 0.5 | 0.80 | Long Pine | US 20 / US 183 / N-7 north of Long Pine | Brown | 1971 | current | |
| S-10A | 0.49 | 0.79 | Kearney Youth Development Center near Kearney | US 30 in Kearney | Buffalo | 1971 | 1994 | Given to the city of Kearney; now 30th Avenue |
| S-11A | 0.53 | 0.85 | Craig | N-32 north of Craig | Burt | 1971 | current | |
| S-12A | 7.26 | 11.68 | N-15 south of Schuyler | Linwood | Butler | 1971 | current | Former Spur 115 and Spur 215 |
| S-12B | 13.1 | 21.1 | N-15 north of David City | Abie | Butler | 1971 | current | Highway goes east from N-15 to Bruno, then north from Bruno to Abie |
| S-12C | 5.1 | 8.2 | Ulysses | N-15 / N-66 east of Ulysses | Butler | 1971 | current | Former Spur 315 |
| S-12D | 0.25 | 0.40 | N-66 south of Dwight | Dwight | Butler | 1971 | current | |
| S-12E | 5.92 | 9.53 | Surprise | N-92 west of Rising City | Butler | 1971 | current | Former Spur 292 |
| S-12F | 1.21 | 1.95 | Brainard | N-92 north of Brainard | Butler | 1971 | current | Former Spur 392 |
| S-13A | 0.72 | 1.16 | N-1 south of Murdock | Murdock | Cass | 1971 | current | Former Spur 150 |
| S-13B | 4.2 | 6.8 | Alvo | US 34 south of Alvo | Cass | 1971 | 1986 | Former Spur 234 and Spur 534; became part of an extended N-63 |
| S-13C | 1.04 | 1.67 | Avoca | US 34 north of Avoca | Cass | 1971 | current | Former portion of N-50A |
| S-13D | 0.93 | 1.50 | US 34 south of Nehawka | Nehawka | Cass | 1971 | current | |
| S-13E | 4.8 | 7.7 | South Bend | N-50 south of Louisville | Cass | 1971 | 1994 | Became part of an extended N-66 |
| S-13F | 0.5 | 0.80 | N-50 west of Manley | Manley | Cass | 1971 | current | |
| S-13H | 2.65 | 4.26 | N-66 south of Cedar Creek | Cedar Creek | Cass | 1971 | current | |
| S-13J | 3.4 | 5.5 | Weeping Water | US 34 south of Weeping Water | Cass | 1971 | 1986 | Now 144th Street |
| S-13K | 1.88 | 3.03 | N-50 west of Weeping Water | Weeping Water | Cass | 1971 | current | Former portion of N-50A |
| S-14A | 2.17 | 3.49 | Fordyce | N-12 north of Fordyce | Cedar | 1971 | current | |
| S-14B | 0.27 | 0.43 | N-12 south of Wynot | Wynot | Cedar | 1971 | current | |
| S-14C | 0.81 | 1.30 | Magnet | N-59 north of Magnet | Cedar | 1971 | current | |
| S-14H | 5.37 | 8.64 | N-12 south of St. Helena | St. Helena | Cedar | 1971 | current | |
| S-15A | 6.7 | 10.8 | Champion | US 6 in Imperial | Chase | 1971 | current | Highway also serves Champion Mill Park; former Spur 106 |
| S-16A | 0.12 | 0.19 | N-12 northeast of Valentine | Fort Niobrara National Wildlife Refuge | Cherry | 1971 | current | |
| S-16B | 13.47 | 21.68 | Valentine National Wildlife Refuge | US 83 south of Valentine | Cherry | 1971 | current | Former Spur 214 and portion of Spur 483 |
| S-16F | 18.9 | 30.4 | Samuel R. McKelvie National Forest | US 20 in Nenzel | Cherry | 1971 | current | |
| S-17A | 2.2 | 3.5 | Road 32S | L-17C | Cheyenne | 1971 | 1996 | Former Spur 230 |
| S-18A | 2.41 | 3.88 | US 6 south of Harvard | Harvard | Clay | 1971 | current | Former Spur 506 |
| S-18B | 4.01 | 6.45 | N-14 west of Edgar | Edgar | Clay | 1971 | current | Former Spur 214 |
| S-18C | 5.03 | 8.10 | Deweese | N-14 east of Deweese | Clay | 1971 | current | Former Spur 314 |
| S-18D | 4.71 | 7.58 | U.S. Meat Animal Research Center west of Clay Center | N-14 / N-41 in Clay Center | Clay | 1971 | current | |
| S-18E | 4.51 | 7.26 | N-74 south of Glenvil | Glenvil | Clay | 1971 | current | Former Spur 174 |
| S-18F | 1.46 | 2.35 | Ong | N-74 north of Ong | Clay | 1971 | current | Former Spur 274 |
| S-18G | 1.26 | 2.03 | US 6 south of Saronville | Saronville | Clay | 1971 | current | |
| S-19A | 0.19 | 0.31 | Leigh | N-91 north of Leigh | Colfax | 1971 | current | |
| S-19B | 0.25 | 0.40 | N-91 south of Clarkson | Clarkson | Colfax | 1971 | current | |
| S-19C | 0.25 | 0.40 | N-91 south of Howells | Howells | Colfax | 1971 | current | |
| S-21A | 6.25 | 10.06 | N-2 in Anselmo | Victoria Springs State Recreation Area | Custer | 1971 | current | Former Spur 302 |
| S-21B | 0.72 | 1.16 | N-40 south of Callaway | Callaway | Custer | 1971 | current | |
| S-21C | 7.36 | 11.84 | US 183 west of Comstock | Comstock | Custer | 1971 | current | Former Spur 1183 |
| S-23A | 1.93 | 3.11 | US 20 south of Whitney | Whitney | Dawes | 1971 | current | Former N-120 |
| S-24C | 0.11 | 0.18 | N-40 southwest of Eddyville | Eddyville | Dawson | — | — | |
| S-26A | 1.29 | 2.08 | Waterbury | US 20 north of Waterbury | Dixon | 1971 | current | Former Spur 620 |
| S-26B | 2.76 | 4.44 | N-116 west of Concord | University of Nebraska Northeast Experimental Station east of Concord | Dixon | 1971 | current | Former Spur 1116; passes through Concord |
| S-26E | 2.21 | 3.56 | N-12 in Ponca | Ponca State Park | Dixon | 1971 | current | |
| S-27A | 0.26 | 0.42 | N-91 south of Dodge | Dodge | Dodge | 1971 | current | |
| S-27D | 0.55 | 0.89 | US 275 / N-91 south of Hooper | Hooper | Dodge | — | — | |
| S-27E | 0.24 | 0.39 | US 77 | Inglewood | Dodge | 2024 | current | Added as state maintained access to Inglewood after highway redesign south of the city routed US 77 around Inglewood and Fremont. |
| S-28F | 0.09 | 0.14 | Bennington city limits | N-36 south of Bennington | Douglas | 1971 | 2015 | Now 156th Street; until 2000, continued further south in Bennington |
| S-28J | 1.29 | 2.08 | N-36 south of Washington | Washington | Douglas | 1976 | current | Highway enters Washington County |
| S-28L | 0.31 | 0.50 | N-64 north of Waterloo | Waterloo city limits | Douglas | — | 2006 | Decommissioned when L-28B was converted to a freeway; now J C Robinson Boulevard |
| S-29A | 0.3 | 0.48 | US 34/N-61 north of Benkelman | Benkelman city limits | Dundy | 1971 | 2006 | Given to the city of Benkelman; now A Street |
| S-30A | 1.24 | 2.00 | N-41 in Geneva | Nebraska Youth Development Center | Fillmore | 1971 | 1979 | Former portion of Spur 430, cancelled in exchange for creating S-30J (which was decommissioned by 2004); now 1st Street |
| S-30B | 0.33 | 0.53 | Shickley | N-74 north of Shickley | Fillmore | 1971 | current | |
| S-30C | 0.33 | 0.53 | Ohiowa | N-74 north of Ohiowa | Fillmore | 1971 | current | |
| S-30D | 0.31 | 0.50 | Strang | N-74 north of Strang | Fillmore | 1971 | current | |
| S-30H | 0.38 | 0.61 | Milligan | N-41 north of Milligan | Fillmore | — | — | |
| S-30J | 1.24 | 2.00 | Nebraska Youth Development Center | US 81 near Geneva | Fillmore | 1979 | 2004 | Given to the city of Geneva; now R Street and 1st Street |
| S-31A | 2.61 | 4.20 | N-10 west of Upland | Upland | Franklin | 1971 | current | Former Spur 210 |
| S-31B | 4.51 | 7.26 | Hildreth | N-10 east of Hildreth | Franklin | 1971 | current | Former Spur 310 |
| S-31C | 1.68 | 2.70 | Naponee | US 136 north of Naponee | Franklin | 1971 | current | Former Spur 2136 |
| S-34A | 2.59 | 4.17 | N-8 south of Liberty | Liberty | Gage | 1971 | current | Former Spur 208 |
| S-34B | 4.65 | 7.48 | N-41 south of Firth | Firth | Gage | 1971 | current | Former Spur 341; highway enters Lancaster County |
| S-34C | 0.24 | 0.39 | Adams | N-41 north of Adams | Gage | 1971 | current | |
| S-34D | 0.59 | 0.95 | US 77 west of Pickrell | Pickrell | Gage | 1971 | current | |
| S-34E | — | — | US 77 in Beatrice | Beatrice State Developmental Center | Gage | 1971 | 1977 | Now Lincoln Avenue |
| S-40A | — | — | Cornhusker Ordinance Plant (now Cornhusker Army Ammunition Plant) | US 281 in Grand Island | Hall | 1971 | 1978 | Decommissioned when the plant closed; now Old Potash Highway |
| S-40B | 0.16 | 0.26 | US 34/US 281 near Doniphan | Doniphan | Hall | 1971 | 2008 | Given to the city of Doniphan; now Platte River Drive |
| S-40D | 6.09 | 9.80 | Prosser | N-11 / I-80 (exit 300) south of Wood River | Hall | 1971 | current | Highway enters Adams County |
| S-41A | 1.51 | 2.43 | US 34 south of Phillips | Phillips | Hamilton | 1971 | current | Former portion of Spur 402 |
| S-41B | 6.71 | 10.80 | Giltner | US 34 west of Aurora | Hamilton | 1971 | current | Former Spur 502; highway intersects I-80 at Exit 324 |
| S-41C | 0.38 | 0.61 | Marquette | N-14 east of Marquette | Hamilton | 1971 | current | |
| S-42A | 4.15 | 6.68 | US 183 west of Huntley | Huntley | Harlan | 1971 | current | Former Spur 2183 |
| S-43A | 0.23 | 0.37 | US 6 south of Hamlet | Hamlet | Hayes | 1971 | current | |
| S-45A | 4.22 | 6.79 | US 20 south of Page | Page | Holt | 1971 | current | Former Spur 320 |
| S-47A | 0.15 | 0.24 | Farwell | N-92 north of Farwell | Howard | 1971 | current | |
| S-48A | 0.38 | 0.61 | Steele City | N-8 north of Steele City | Jefferson | 1971 | current | |
| S-49A | 0.83 | 1.34 | N-50 west of Cook | Cook | Johnson | 1971 | current | |
| S-49B | 0.23 | 0.37 | N-62 south of Elk Creek | Elk Creek | Johnson | 1971 | current | |
| S-49C | 0.23 | 0.37 | US 136 west of Crab Orchard | Crab Orchard | Johnson | 1971 | current | |
| S-54A | 0.24 | 0.39 | Verdigre | N-14 / N-84 east of Verdigre | Knox | 1971 | current | |
| S-54B | 3.04 | 4.89 | N-59 south of Winnetoon | Winnetoon | Knox | 1971 | current | |
| S-54D | 8.38 | 13.49 | N-12 east of Niobrara | Santee | Knox | 1971 | current | |
| S-55A | 5.11 | 8.22 | Denton | US 6 west of Lincoln | Lancaster | 1971 | current | Former Spur 806 |
| S-55B | 1.75 | 2.82 | Sprague | N-33 north of Sprague | Lancaster | 1971 | current | |
| S-55C | 0.75 | 1.21 | Lincoln Air Park | US 34 northwest of Lincoln | Lancaster | 1971 | current | Former Spur 334 |
| S-55D | 0.5 | 0.80 | Panama | N-43 east of Panama | Lancaster | 1971 | current | |
| S-55E | 1.4 | 2.3 | Davey | US 77 east of Davey | Lancaster | 1971 | current | |
| S-55F | 2.28 | 3.67 | US 77 / N-33 west of Roca | Roca | Lancaster | 1971 | current | Former Spur 277 and Spur 377 |
| S-55G | 3.82 | 6.15 | US 77 west of Hickman | Hickman | Lancaster | 1971 | current | Former Spur 477 |
| S-55H | 3.9 | 6.3 | Hallam | US 77 north of Cortland | Lancaster | 1971 | current | Former Spur 577 |
| S-55J | 0.49 | 0.79 | N-79 west of Raymond | Raymond | Lancaster | 1971 | current | |
| S-55M | 2.33 | 3.75 | Malcolm | US 34 southeast of Malcolm | Lancaster | 1971 | current | |
| S-56A | 3.88 | 6.24 | Fort McPherson National Cemetery | US 30 in Maxwell | Lincoln | 1971 | current | Former Spur 330; highway intersects Interstate 80 at Exit 190 |
| S-56B | 0.19 | 0.31 | University of Nebraska North Platte Experimental Station | US 83 south of North Platte | Lincoln | 1971 | 2004 | Now State Farm Road |
| S-57A | 2.25 | 3.62 | US 83 / N-92 west of Gandy | Gandy | Logan | 1971 | current | Former Spur 583 |
| S-59A | — | — | Business US 275 in Norfolk | Norfolk Regional Center | Madison | 1971 | 2001 | Former Spur 1275; now 557th Avenue/Victory Road; original route (cancelled 1994) now 1st Street and Benjamin Avenue |
| S-61A | 1.75 | 2.82 | N-92 south of Palmer | Palmer | Merrick | 1971 | current | Former Spur 192 |
| S-64A | 0.48 | 0.77 | Julian | US 75 east of Julian | Nemaha | 1971 | current | Highway on Nemaha County-Otoe County border |
| S-64B | 0.44 | 0.71 | N-105 west of Johnson | Johnson | Nemaha | 1971 | current | |
| S-64E | 4.86 | 7.82 | N-67 northeast of Shubert | Indian Cave State Park | Nemaha | 1971 | current | Highway lies on border with Richardson County and also enters it briefly |
| S-64G | 0.62 | 1.00 | N-67 south of Peru | Peru | Nemaha | 1971 | current | |
| S-65A | 5.19 | 8.35 | Oak | N-4 north of Oak | Nuckolls | 1971 | current | Former Spur 204 |
| S-66A | 8.02 | 12.91 | Douglas | N-2 at Palmyra | Otoe | 1971 | current | Former Spur 802 |
| S-66C | 2.79 | 4.49 | N-50 west of Otoe | Otoe | Otoe | 1971 | current | Former Spur 350 |
| S-66D | 0.5 | 0.80 | Talmage | N-67 east of Talmage | Otoe | 1971 | current | |
| S-66E | 6.18 | 9.95 | Burr | N-50 east of Burr | Otoe | 1971 | current | |
| S-67A | 0.2 | 0.32 | Lewiston | N-4 north of Lewiston | Pawnee | 1971 | current | |
| S-67B | 2.59 | 4.17 | Steinauer | N-50 east of Steinauer | Pawnee | 1971 | current | Former Spur 550 |
| S-67C | 3.03 | 4.88 | southwest of Pawnee City | N-65 south of Pawnee City | Pawnee | 1971 | current | Former Spur 165; highway is gravel |
| S-70A | 1.25 | 2.01 | US 20 south of McLean | McLean | Pierce | 1971 | current | |
| S-71A | 0.92 | 1.48 | Humphrey | US 81 east of Humphrey | Platte | 1971 | current | |
| S-71B | 0.97 | 1.56 | Platte Center | US 81 east of Platte Center | Platte | 1971 | current | Former Spur 181 |
| S-71C | 0.25 | 0.40 | Creston | N-91 north of Creston | Platte | 1971 | current | |
| S-71F | 1.3 | 2.1 | Cornlea | N-91 north of Cornlea | Platte | 1971 | current | |
| S-76A | 4.35 | 7.00 | US 6 south of Cordova | Cordova | Saline | 1971 | current | Former Spur 606; highway enters Seward County |
| S-76B | — | — | N-33 south of Dorchester | Dorchester | Saline | — | — | Now Washington Avenue |
| S-76C | 0.76 | 1.22 | Western | N-15 east of Western | Saline | 1971 | current | |
| S-76D | 7.01 | 11.28 | Swanton | N-41 north of Swanton | Saline | 1971 | current | Former Spur 241 |
| S-77B | — | — | US 75 in Bellevue | Offutt Air Force Base | Sarpy | 1974 | 1992 | Access road into Offutt Air Force Base; decommissioned due to completion of US 75 |
| S-77C | — | — | US 75 in Bellevue | Offutt Air Force Base | Sarpy | 1974 | 1992 | Access road into Offutt Air Force Base; decommissioned due to completion of US 75 |
| S-78B | 0.6 | 0.97 | N-66 south of Ithaca | Ithaca | Saunders | 1971 | current | |
| S-78C | 0.29 | 0.47 | Memphis | N-66 east of Memphis | Saunders | 1971 | current | |
| S-78D | 0.67 | 1.08 | Weston | N-92 north of Weston | Saunders | 1971 | current | Former Spur 492 |
| S-78E | 4.03 | 6.49 | N-92 south of Malmo | Malmo | Saunders | 1971 | current | Former Spur 592 |
| S-78F | 0.25 | 0.40 | Mead | N-92 at Mead | Saunders | 1971 | current | |
| S-78G | 0.17 | 0.27 | N-92 at Yutan | Yutan | Saunders | 1971 | 2008 | Now 2nd Street |
| S-78H | 0.58 | 0.93 | Cedar Bluffs | N-109 east of Cedar Bluffs | Saunders | 1971 | current | |
| S-78J | 0.74 | 1.19 | N-64 south of Leshara | Leshara | Saunders | 1971 | current | |
| S-79A | — | — | F Road | US 26 in Henry | Scotts Bluff | 1971 | 1986 | Former Spur 126; also entered Sioux County; County Road A and Henry Road (County Road 3) |
| S-79B | — | — | Scotts Bluff-Sioux County Line | US 26 in Morrill | Scotts Bluff | 1971 | 1986 | Now County Road 9 |
| S-79H | 2.07 | 3.33 | Terrytown | N-92 in Scottsbluff | Scotts Bluff | 1971 | current | Former alignment of N-71 |
| S-80A | — | — | Pleasant Dale | I-80 north of Pleasant Dale | Seward | 1971 | 1975 | Former Spur 415, became part of an extended N-103 |
| S-80B | 2.01 | 3.23 | N-15 west of Bee | Bee | Seward | 1971 | current | |
| S-80C | 3.54 | 5.70 | Staplehurst | N-15 east of Staplehurst | Seward | 1971 | current | Former Spur 515 |
| S-80D | 3.47 | 5.58 | US 34 south of Garland | Garland | Seward | 1971 | current | Former Spur 702 |
| S-80E | — | — | US 6 in Friend | US 34 east of Utica | Seward | 1971 | 1984 | Originally ended in Beaver Crossing; extended south to Friend in 1982; redesignated as Link 80E |
| S-85A | 0.75 | 1.21 | Byron | N-8 north of Byron | Thayer | 1971 | current | |
| S-85B | 0.28 | 0.45 | Hubbell | N-8 north of Hubbell | Thayer | 1971 | current | |
| S-85C | 0.25 | 0.40 | US 81 west of Bruning | Bruning | Thayer | 1971 | current | |
| S-85D | 0.94 | 1.51 | US 81 west of Belvidere | Belvidere | Thayer | 1971 | current | |
| S-85E | 0.16 | 0.26 | Deshler | US 136 north of Deshler | Thayer | 1971 | current | |
| S-85H | 0.17 | 0.27 | Hebron | US 81 east of Hebron | Thayer | 1999 | current | |
| S-86A | 0.46 | 0.74 | N-2 south of Seneca | Seneca | Thomas | 1971 | current | |
| S-86B | 3.44 | 5.54 | Nebraska National Forest (Bessey Ranger District) | N-2 west of Halsey | Thomas | 1971 | current | Former Spur 202 |
| S-87A | 1.07 | 1.72 | N-9 west of Thurston | Thurston | Thurston | 1971 | current | Former Spur 109 |
| S-87B | 2.51 | 4.04 | Rosalie | US 77 east of Rosalie | Thurston | 1971 | current | Former Spur 177 |
| S-89A | 0.08 | 0.13 | US 30 south of Kennard | Kennard | Washington | 1971 | current | |
| S-90A | 0.25 | 0.40 | N-35 south of Hoskins | Hoskins | Wayne | 1971 | current | |
| S-90B | 0.18 | 0.29 | N-35 west of Winside | Winside | Wayne | 1971 | current | |
| S-91A | 1.86 | 2.99 | N-4 south of Bladen | Bladen | Webster | 1971 | current | Former Spur 104 |
| S-91B | 3.6 | 5.8 | US 281 west of Cowles | Cowles | Webster | 1971 | current | Former Spur 1281 |
| S-93A | 7 | 11 | Henderson | US 34 west of Bradshaw | York | 1971 | current | Former Spur 602; intersects Interstate 80 at Exit 342 |
| S-93C | 0.3 | 0.48 | Benedict | US 81 east of Benedict | York | 1971 | current | |
| S-93D | 0.55 | 0.89 | Nebraska Correctional Center for Women near York | US 81 near York | York | 1971 | current | |
| S-93F | 0.27 | 0.43 | McCool Junction | US 81 north of McCool Junction | York | 1971 | current | Rerouted in 2001 after the US 81 bypass was completed |
Former

== Recreation Roads ==
| Number | Length (mi) | Length (km) | Southern or western terminus | Northern or eastern terminus | Counties | Formed | Removed | Notes |
|---|---|---|---|---|---|---|---|---|
| R-2A | — | — | — | — | Antelope | — | — | Grove Lake Recreation Road, Ashfall Fossil Beds State Historical Park |
| R-2D | — | — | — | — | Antelope | — | — | Ashfall State Historical Park Recreation Road, Ashfall Fossil Beds State Historical Park |
| R-7B | — | — | — | — | Box Butte | — | — | Box Butte Recreation Road, Box Butte Reservoir State Recreation Area |
| R-9B | — | — | — | — | Brown | — | — | Long Pine Recreation Road, Long Pine State Recreation Area |
| R-10H | — | — | — | — | Buffalo | — | — | Windmill State Recreation Road, Windmill State Recreation Area |
| R-13L | — | — | — | — | Cass | — | — | Louisville Lakes Recreation Road, Louisville State Recreation Area |
| R-13M | — | — | — | — | Cass | — | — | Plattsmouth Waterfowl Area Recreation Road, Schilling Wildlife Management Area |
| R-13N | — | — | — | — | Cass | — | — | Platte River Recreation Road, Platte River State Park |
| R-13P | — | — | — | — | Cass | — | — | Eugene T. Mahoney State Park Recreation Road, Eugene T. Mahoney State Park |
| R-15B | — | — | — | — | Chase | — | — | Enders Lake Recreation Road, Enders Reservoir State Recreation Area |
| R-15C | — | — | — | — | Chase | — | — | Champion Mill State Historical Park Recreation Road, Champion Mill State Historical Park |
| R-16C | — | — | — | — | Cherry | — | — | Merritt Reservoir Recreation Road, Merritt Reservoir State Recreation Area |
| R-16D | — | — | — | — | Cherry | — | — | Valentine Fish Hatchery Recreation Road, Minnechaduza Creek |
| R-23E | — | — | — | — | Dawes | — | — | Chadron State Park Recreation Road, Chadron State Park |
| R-23F | — | — | — | — | Dawes | — | — | Smiley Canyon State Wildlife Area Road, Fort Robinson State Park |
| R-23G | — | — | — | — | Dawes | — | — | Fort Robinson State Park Recreation Road, Fort Robinson State Park |
| R-27B | — | — | — | — | Dodge | — | — | Fremont Lakes Recreation Road, Fremont Lakes State Recreation Area |
| R-27C | — | — | — | — | Dodge | — | — | Dead Timber Recreation Road, Dead Timber State Recreation Area |
| R-28C | — | — | — | — | Douglas | — | — | Two Rivers Recreation Road, Two Rivers State Recreation Area |
| R-32A | — | — | — | — | Frontier | — | — | Red Willow Reservoir Recreation Road, Red Willow Reservoir State Recreation Area |
| R-34J | — | — | — | — | Gage | — | — | Rockford Lake Recreation Road, Rockford State Recreation Area |
| R-34K | — | — | — | — | Gage | — | — | Big Indian Reservoir Recreation Road, Big Indian Creek Reservoir 12-1 |
| R-34L | — | — | — | — | Gage | — | — | Big Indian Reservoir Recreation Road, Big Indian Creek Reservoir 12-1 |
| R-35A | — | — | — | — | Garden | — | — | Ash Hollow State Historical Park Recreation Road, Ash Hollow State Historical Park |
| R-35B | — | — | — | — | Garden | — | — | Windlass Hill Recreation Road, Ash Hollow State Historical Park |
| R-37A | — | — | — | — | Gosper | — | — | Johnson Lake Recreation Road, Johnson Lake State Recreation Area |
| R-40E | — | — | — | — | Hall | — | — | Mormon Island Recreation Road, Mormon Island State Recreation Area |
| R-44A | — | — | — | — | Hitchcock | — | — | Macklin Bay Recreation Road, Swanson Reservoir State Recreation Area |
| R-44B | — | — | — | — | Hitchcock | — | — | Swanson Reservoir Recreation Road, Swanson Reservoir State Recreation Area |
| R-48B | — | — | — | — | Jefferson | — | — | Rock Creek Station Recreation Road, Rock Creek Station State Historical Park |
| R-50B | — | — | — | — | Kearney | — | — | Fort Kearney Recreation Area Road, Fort Kearny State Recreation Area |
| R-50C | — | — | — | — | Kearney | — | — | Fort Kearney State Historical Park Recreation Road, Fort Kearny State Historical Park |
| R-51E | — | — | — | — | Keith | — | — | Lake McConaughy South Recreation Road, Lake McConaughy State Recreation Area |
| R-51F | — | — | — | — | Keith | — | — | Lake Ogallala Recreation Road, Lake Ogallala State Recreation Area |
| R-51G | — | — | — | — | Keith | — | — | Martin Bay Recreation Road, Lake McConaughy State Recreation Area |
| R-51H | — | — | — | — | Keith | — | — | Cedar Vue Recreation Road, Lake McConaughy State Recreation Area |
| R-54C | — | — | — | — | Knox | — | — | Wiegand Recreation Road, Lewis and Clark State Recreation Area |
| R-54F | — | — | — | — | Knox | — | — | Niobrara State Park Recreation Road, Niobrara State Park |
| R-55N | — | — | — | — | Lancaster | — | — | Blue Stem Lake Recreation Area Road, Bluestem State Recreation Area |
| R-55P | — | — | — | — | Lancaster | — | — | Wagon Train Lake Recreation Area Road, Wagon Train State Recreation Area |
| R-55R | — | — | — | — | Lancaster | — | — | Conestoga Lake Recreation Area Road, Conestoga State Recreation Area |
| R-55T | — | — | — | — | Lancaster | — | — | Branched Oak Lake Recreation Road, Branched Oak State Recreation Area |
| R-55U | — | — | — | — | Lancaster | — | — | Pawnee Lake Recreation Road, Pawnee State Recreation Area |
| R-55V | — | — | — | — | Lancaster | — | — | Kildeer Lake Recreation Road, Kildeer State Special Use Area |
| R-56E | — | — | — | — | Lincoln | — | — | Scouts Rest Ranch Recreation Road, Buffalo Bill Ranch State Historical Park |
| R-56F | — | — | — | — | Lincoln | — | — | Maloney Reservoir Recreation Road, Buffalo Bill Ranch State Historical Park |
| R-62B | — | — | — | — | Morrill | — | — | Bridgeport Recreation Road, Bridgeport State Recreation Area |
| R-62F | — | — | — | — | Morrill | — | — | Chimney Rock Recreation Road, Chimney Rock National Historic Site |
| R-64F | — | — | — | — | Nemaha | — | — | Indian Cave Recreation Road, Indian Cave State Park |
| R-64H | — | — | — | — | Nemaha | — | — | Brownville Recreation Road, Brownville State Recreation Area |
| R-67D | — | — | — | — | Pawnee | — | — | Burchard Lake Recreation Road, Burchard Lake State Park |
| R-69A | — | — | — | — | Phelps | — | — | Sacramento Game Farm Recreation Road, Sacramento-Wilcox Wildlife Management Area |
| R-71G | — | — | — | — | Platte | — | — | Lake North Recreation Road, Lake North Campground |
| R-73A | — | — | — | — | Red Willow | — | — | Medicine Creek Reservoir Recreation Road, Medicine Creek State Recreation Area |
| R-78K | — | — | — | — | Saunders | — | — | Memphis Lake Recreation Road, Memphis State Recreation Area |
| R-82B | — | — | — | — | Sherman | — | — | Sherman Lake Recreation Road, Sherman Reservoir State Recreation Area |
| R-85G | — | — | — | — | Thayer | — | — | Alexandria Lakes Recreation Road, Alexandria State Recreation Area |
| R-88B | — | — | — | — | Valley | — | — | Fort Hartsuff Recreation Road, Fort Hartsuff State Historical Park |
| R-89B | — | — | — | — | Washington | — | — | Fort Atkinson State Historical Park Recreation Road, Fort Atkinson State Historical Park |
| R-92A | — | — | — | — | Wheeler | — | — | Pibel Lake Recreation Road, Pibel Lake State Recreation Area |
