= Belle Prairie Township =

Belle Prairie Township may refer to:

- Belle Prairie Township, Livingston County, Illinois
- Belle Prairie Township, Morrison County, Minnesota
- Belle Prairie Township, Fillmore County, Nebraska
