= Inland Township =

Inland Township may refer to the following places in the United States:

- Inland Township, Cedar County, Iowa
- Inland Township, Michigan
- Inland Township, Clay County, Nebraska
