= Deweese, Nebraska =

Village in Clay County, Nebraska, United States

- Village
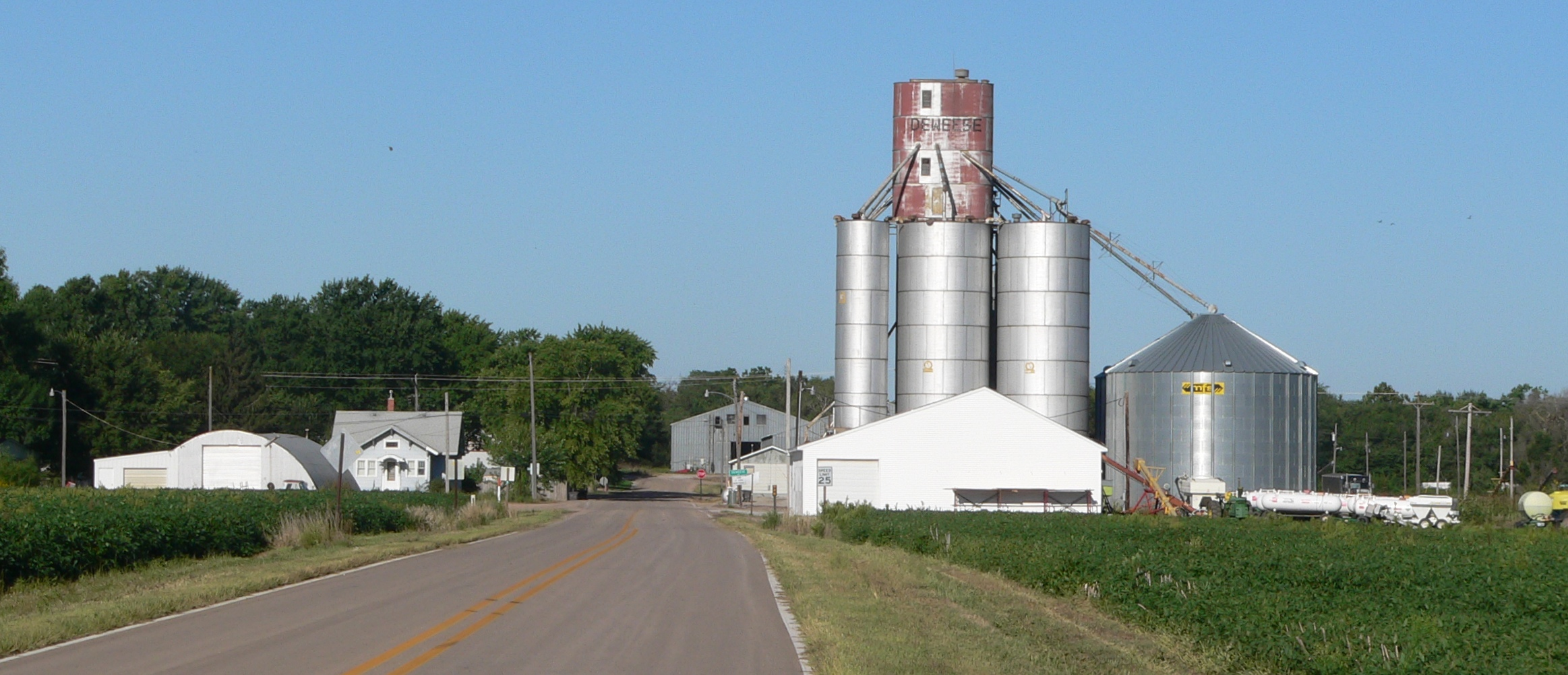
- West along Nebraska Spur 18C at Deweese, September 2010

- Location of Deweese, Nebraska
- Coordinates: 40°21′17″N 98°08′21″W
- Country: United States
- State: Nebraska
- County: Clay

Area
  - Total: 0.13 sq mi (0.33 km^{2})
  - Land: 0.13 sq mi (0.33 km^{2})
  - Water: 0 sq mi (0.00 km^{2})
- Elevation: 1,693 ft (516 m)

Population (2020)
  - Total: 43
  - Estimate (2021): 43
  - Density: 340/sq mi (130/km^{2})
- Time zone: UTC-6 (Central (CST))
  - Summer (DST): UTC-5 (CDT)
- ZIP code: 68934
- Area code: 402
- FIPS code: 31-12945
- GNIS feature ID: 2398718

Deweese is a village in Clay County, Nebraska, United States. The population was 43 at the 2020 census. It is part of the Hastings, Nebraska Micropolitan Statistical Area.

== History ==
Deweese was platted in 1885 when the Burlington and Missouri River Railroad was extended to that point. It was named for James W. Deweese, a railroad attorney.

== Geography ==
According to the United States Census Bureau, the village has a total area of 0.13 square miles (0.34 km^{2}), all land.

== Demographics ==
Historical population
Census	Pop.	Note	%±
1920	144		—
1930	156		8.3%
1940	134		−14.1%
1950	115		−14.2%
1960	100		−13.0%
1970	86		−14.0%
1980	69		−19.8%
1990	74		7.2%
2000	80		8.1%
2010	67		−16.2%
2020	42		−37.3%
2021 (est.)	43	▲	2.4%
U.S. Decennial Census

=== 2010 census ===
As of the census of 2010, there were 67 people, 29 households, and 17 families living in the village. The population density was 515.4 inhabitants per square mile (199.0/km^{2}). There were 37 housing units at an average density of 284.6 per square mile (109.9/km^{2}). The racial makeup of the village was 100.0% White.

There were 29 households, of which 34.5% had children under the age of 18 living with them, 48.3% were married couples living together, 3.4% had a female householder with no husband present, 6.9% had a male householder with no wife present, and 41.4% were non-families. 41.4% of all households were made up of individuals, and 6.9% had someone living alone who was 65 years of age or older. The average household size was 2.31 and the average family size was 3.24.

The median age in the village was 43.5 years. 26.9% of residents were under the age of 18; 13.4% were between the ages of 18 and 24; 13.5% were from 25 to 44; 32.8% were from 45 to 64; and 13.4% were 65 years of age or older. The gender makeup of the village was 59.7% male and 40.3% female.

=== 2000 census ===
As of the census of 2000, there were 80 people, 35 households, and 17 families living in the village. The population density was 855.9 inhabitants per square mile (330.5/km^{2}). There were 43 housing units at an average density of 460.0 per square mile (177.6/km^{2}). The racial makeup of the village was 98.75% White, 1.25% from other races. Hispanic or Latino of any race were 1.25% of the population.

There were 35 households, out of which 28.6% had children under the age of 18 living with them, 40.0% were married couples living together, 5.7% had a female householder with no husband present, and 48.6% were non-families. 42.9% of all households were made up of individuals, and 25.7% had someone living alone who was 65 years of age or older. The average household size was 2.29 and the average family size was 3.22.

In the village, the population was spread out, with 33.8% under the age of 18, 35.0% from 25 to 44, 12.5% from 45 to 64, and 18.8% who were 65 years of age or older. The median age was 37 years. For every 100 females, there were 116.2 males. For every 100 females age 18 and over, there were 103.8 males.

As of 2000 the median income for a household in the village was $22,500, and the median income for a family was $31,250. Males had a median income of $23,125 versus $13,125 for females. The per capita income for the village was $13,018. There were no families and 2.9% of the population living below the poverty line, including no under eighteens and none of those over 64.

== See also ==
- List of municipalities in Nebraska
