= Verona, Nebraska =

Unincorporated community in Clay County, Nebraska, United States

- Unincorporated community
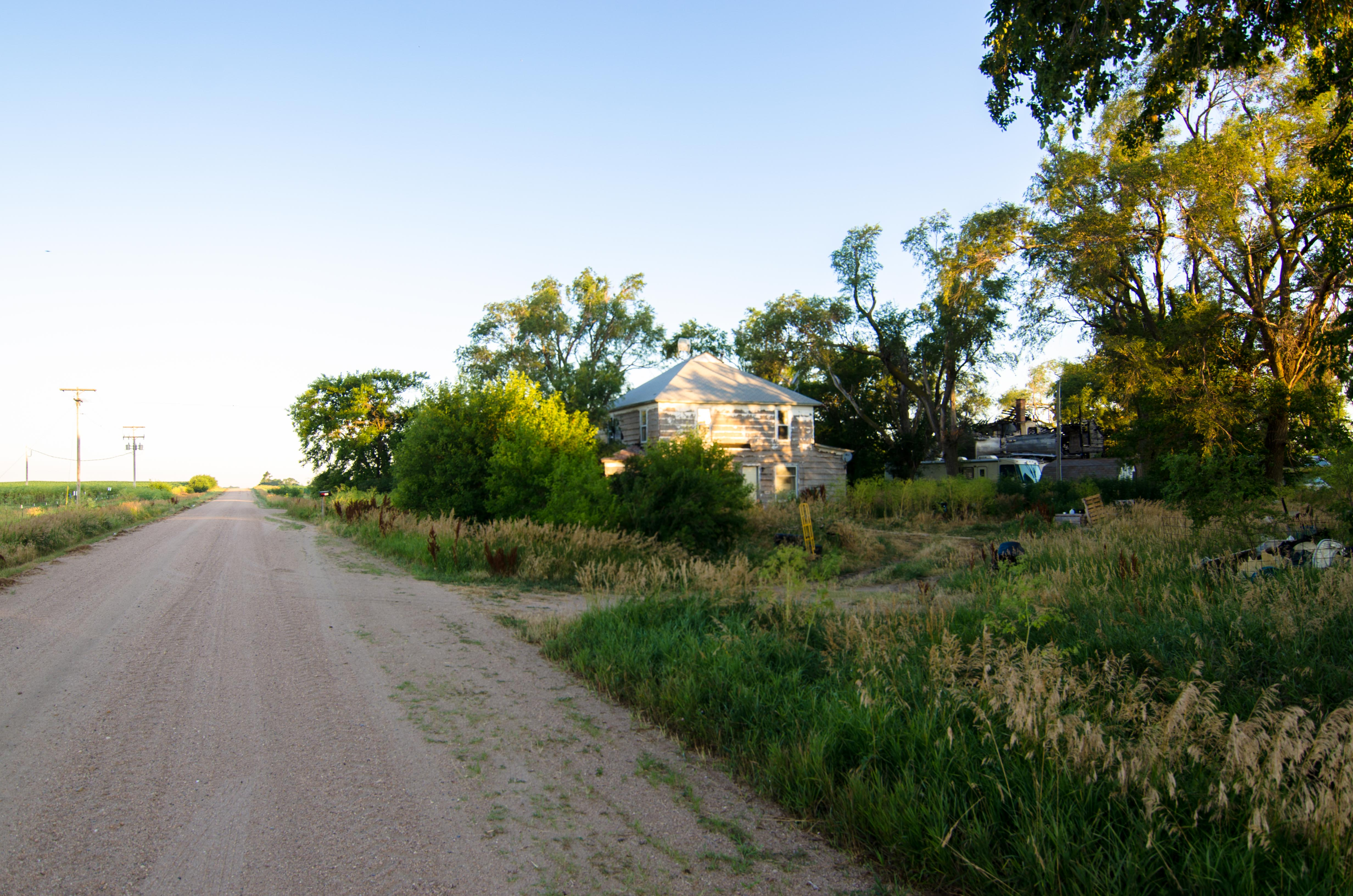
- Road 315 in Verona, July 2017

- Location within the state of Nebraska
- Coordinates: 40°33′13″N 97°57′58″W
- Country: United States
- State: Nebraska
- County: Clay
- Elevation: 1,772 ft (540 m)
- Time zone: UTC-6 (Central (CST))
  - Summer (DST): UTC-5 (CDT)
- ZIP codes: 68933
- FIPS code: 31-24055
- GNIS feature ID: 834374

Verona is an unincorporated community in Clay County, Nebraska, United States.

== History ==
Verona was named in 1884 for the Veronica family of pioneer settlers. A post office was established in Verona in 1887, and remained in operation until it was discontinued in 1954.
