= Edgar, Nebraska =

- City
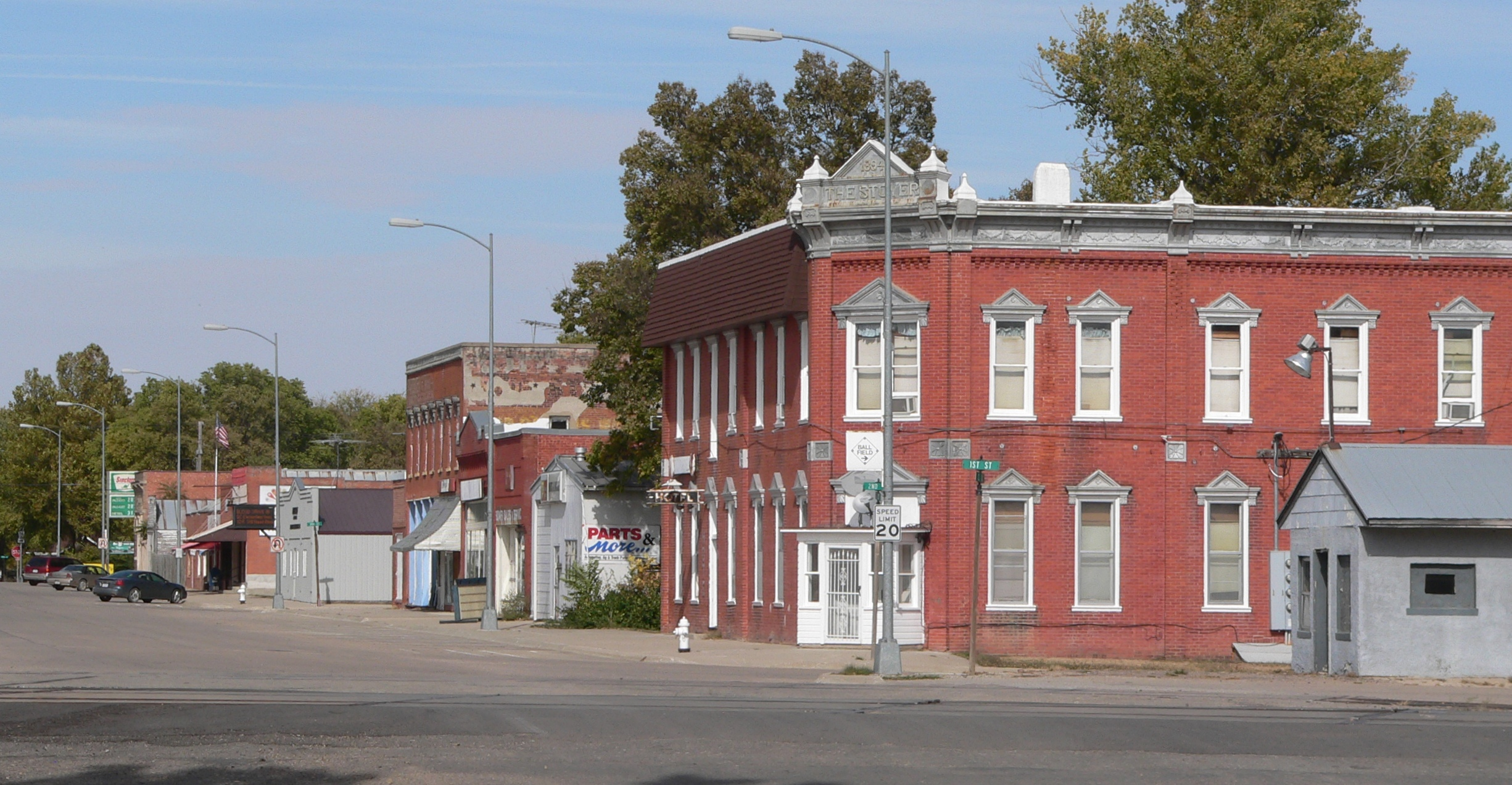
- Downtown Edgar: C Street

- Location of Edgar, Nebraska
- Coordinates: 40°22′06″N 97°58′16″W
- Country: United States
- State: Nebraska
- County: Clay

Area
  - Total: 0.79 sq mi (2.05 km^{2})
  - Land: 0.79 sq mi (2.05 km^{2})
  - Water: 0 sq mi (0.00 km^{2})
- Elevation: 1,729 ft (527 m)

Population (2020)
  - Total: 428
  - Density: 542.0/sq mi (209.26/km^{2})
- Time zone: UTC-6 (Central (CST))
  - Summer (DST): UTC-5 (CDT)
- ZIP code: 68935
- Area code: 402
- FIPS code: 31-14450
- GNIS feature ID: 2394616
- Website: www.ci.edgar.ne.us

Edgar is a city in Clay County, Nebraska, United States. As of the 2020 census, Edgar had a population of 428. It is part of the Hastings, Nebraska Micropolitan Statistical Area.

== History ==
The first post office at Edgar was established in 1872. Edgar was platted as a town in 1873, when the railroad was extended to that point. It was named for the son of a pioneer settler.

== Geography ==
According to the United States Census Bureau, the city has a total area of 0.79 square miles (2.05 km^{2}), all land.

== Demographics ==
Historical population
Census	Pop.	Note	%±
1880	577		—
1890	1,105		91.5%
1900	1,040		−5.9%
1910	1,080		3.8%
1920	906		−16.1%
1930	987		8.9%
1940	708		−28.3%
1950	724		2.3%
1960	730		0.8%
1970	707		−3.2%
1980	705		−0.3%
1990	600		−14.9%
2000	539		−10.2%
2010	498		−7.6%
2020	428		−14.1%
U.S. Decennial Census

=== 2010 census ===
As of the census of 2010, there were 498 people, 212 households, and 120 families living in the city. The population density was 630.4 inhabitants per square mile (243.4/km^{2}). There were 256 housing units at an average density of 324.1 per square mile (125.1/km^{2}). The racial makeup of the city was 97.6% White, 0.2% Native American, 1.4% from other races, and 0.8% from two or more races. Hispanic or Latino of any race were 2.6% of the population.

There were 212 households, of which 27.4% had children under the age of 18 living with them, 48.1% were married couples living together, 6.1% had a female householder with no husband present, 2.4% had a male householder with no wife present, and 43.4% were non-families. 39.2% of all households were made up of individuals, and 20.7% had someone living alone who was 65 years of age or older. The average household size was 2.22 and the average family size was 3.01.

The median age in the city was 44 years. 22.5% of residents were under the age of 18; 7.1% were between the ages of 18 and 24; 21% were from 25 to 44; 23.2% were from 45 to 64; and 25.9% were 65 years of age or older. The gender makeup of the city was 50.0% male and 50.0% female.

=== 2000 census ===
As of the census of 2000, there were 539 people, 240 households, and 150 families living in the city. The population density was 707.2 inhabitants per square mile (273.1/km^{2}). There were 285 housing units at an average density of 373.9 per square mile (144.4/km^{2}). The racial makeup of the city was 97.77% White, 0.56% African American, 1.11% Native American, 0.19% Asian, 0.37% from other races. Hispanic or Latino of any race were 0.74% of the population.

There were 240 households, out of which 25.8% had children under the age of 18 living with them, 52.1% were married couples living together, 7.5% had a female householder with no husband present, and 37.5% were non-families. 34.2% of all households were made up of individuals, and 22.1% had someone living alone who was 65 years of age or older. The average household size was 2.25 and the average family size was 2.87.

In the city, the population was spread out, with 24.1% under the age of 18, 5.2% from 18 to 24, 24.7% from 25 to 44, 22.3% from 45 to 64, and 23.7% who were 65 years of age or older. The median age was 42 years. For every 100 females, there were 98.2 males. For every 100 females age 18 and over, there were 94.8 males.

The median income for a household in the city was $29,191, and the median income for a family was $39,286. Males had a median income of $27,417 versus $17,000 for females. The per capita income for the city was $18,447. About 4.9% of families and 7.5% of the population were below the poverty line, including 8.4% of those under age 18 and 10.1% of those age 65 or over.

=== Sedan ===
Sedan is an unincorporated area about 4.5 miles southeast of Edgar on the intersection of Nebraska 65a Spur and County Road 348 in Nuckolls County, which runs next to the Union Pacific railroad. It is the site of an Aurora Cooperative grain elevator facility. The United States Postal Service does not recognize Sedan, and requires mail to be addressed to Edgar using its zip code.
