= Eldorado, Nebraska =

Unincorporated community in Nebraska, United States

- Unincorporated Community
- Location within Nebraska Location within the United States
- Coordinates: 40.7°N 98°W
- Country: United States
- State: Nebraska
- County: Clay

Eldorado is an unincorporated community in Clay County, Nebraska, United States.

== History ==
Eldorado is derived from a Spanish name meaning "golden" and the community was so named by account of its golden soil. A post office was established at El Dorado in 1888, and remained in operation until it was discontinued in 1942.
