= Howard Bradley Smith =

American author, lecturer, and memory expert

- Born: 1894; Ong, Nebraska
- Died: 1894 (aged -1–0)
- Occupations: author, lecturer, educator, memory expert
- Spouse: Myrtle Adee (m. 1920; div) Elisabeth Ross (m. 1936)
- Children: Ivan (b. 1922); Gregg (b. 1931); Karen (b. 1937)

Howard Bradley Smith was an author, lecturer and memory expert.

With the post–World War II economic expansion requiring improved bureaucratic organization, Smith authored two books focused on the new pursuit of "executive skills": How to Remember Names and Faces and Developing Your Executive Ability. From the 1940s through the 1960s, under the banner of the Redpath Lecture Bureau (previously Boston Lyceum Bureau), he made lecture appearances demonstrating a mnemonic approach to remembering names and faces. During the late 1950s he lectured on improved executive skills and memory for the Dale Carnegie Institute.

== Early life, marriage, and family ==
Smith was born in Ong, Nebraska in 1894 and attended Peru State College, where he received his A.B. and M.Ed. and served as editor of The Peru Normalite. Smith moved to Chicago in 1920 where he married Mildred Adee and had two sons, Ivan Smith (b. 1922) and Gregg Smith (b. 1931). In 1936 he married Elisabeth Ross and had a daughter, Karen (b. 1937).
