= Trumbull, Nebraska =

Village in Nebraska, US

- Village
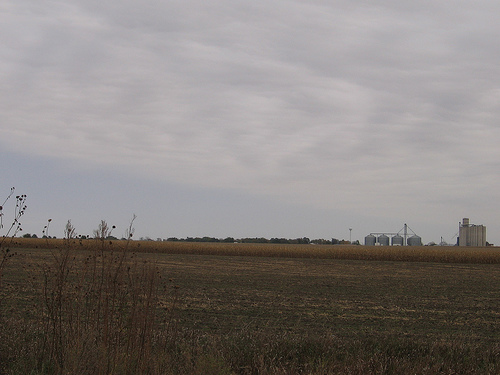
- Skyline of Trumbull

- Location of Trumbull, Nebraska
- Coordinates: 40°40′48″N 98°16′24″W
- Country: United States
- State: Nebraska
- Counties: Clay, Adams
- Townships: Leicester, West Blue
- Platted: 1886

Area
  - Total: 0.43 sq mi (1.12 km^{2})
  - Land: 0.43 sq mi (1.12 km^{2})
  - Water: 0 sq mi (0.00 km^{2})
- Elevation: 1,877 ft (572 m)

Population (2020)
  - Total: 198
  - Estimate (2021): 197
  - Density: 449.7/sq mi (173.64/km^{2})
- Time zone: UTC-6 (Central (CST))
  - Summer (DST): UTC-5 (CDT)
- ZIP code: 68980
- Area code: 402
- FIPS code: 31-49285
- GNIS feature ID: 2400006

Trumbull is a village in Clay and Adams counties in Nebraska, United States. The population was 198 at the 2020 census. It is part of the Hastings, Nebraska Micropolitan Statistical Area.

== History ==
Trumbull was platted in 1886 when the Burlington and Missouri River Railroad was extended to that point. Unverified stories purport that the farmer who donated the land to found Trumbull gave the land to the village under the sole condition that the sale of alcohol be expressly forbidden within the village limits; causing this rule to be written in the village charter.

== Geography ==
Trumbull is located almost entirely in Clay County; only a small portion of the village lies in Adams County.

According to the United States Census Bureau, the village has a total area of 0.43 square miles (1.11 km^{2}), all land.

== Demographics ==
Historical population
Census	Pop.	Note	%±
1920	236		—
1930	181		−23.3%
1940	126		−30.4%
1950	150		19.0%
1960	173		15.3%
1970	220		27.2%
1980	216		−1.8%
1990	225		4.2%
2000	212		−5.8%
2010	205		−3.3%
2020	194		−5.4%
2021 (est.)	197	▲	1.5%
U.S. Decennial Census

=== 2010 census ===
As of the census of 2010, there were 205 people, 74 households, and 59 families living in the village. The population density was 476.7 inhabitants per square mile (184.1/km^{2}). There were 83 housing units at an average density of 193.0 per square mile (74.5/km^{2}). The racial makeup of the village was 94.6% White, 0.5% African American, 2.9% from other races, and 2.0% from two or more races. Hispanic or Latino of any race were 4.4% of the population.

There were 74 households, of which 41.9% had children under the age of 18 living with them, 66.2% were married couples living together, 5.4% had a female householder with no husband present, 8.1% had a male householder with no wife present, and 20.3% were non-families. 17.6% of all households were made up of individuals, and 5.4% had someone living alone who was 65 years of age or older. The average household size was 2.77 and the average family size was 3.08.

The median age in the village was 35.8 years. 32.2% of residents were under the age of 18; 5.4% were between the ages of 18 and 24; 22.6% were from 25 to 44; 25.4% were from 45 to 64; and 14.6% were 65 years of age or older. The gender makeup of the village was 48.3% male and 51.7% female.

=== 2000 census ===
As of the census of 2000, there were 212 people, 76 households, and 63 families living in the village. The population density was 489.4 inhabitants per square mile (189.0/km^{2}). There were 80 housing units at an average density of 184.7 per square mile (71.3/km^{2}). The racial makeup of the village was 99.53% White, and 0.47% Asian.

There were 76 households, out of which 43.4% had children under the age of 18 living with them, 72.4% were married couples living together, 7.9% had a female householder with no husband present, and 15.8% were non-families. 15.8% of all households were made up of individuals, and 3.9% had someone living alone who was 65 years of age or older. The average household size was 2.79 and the average family size was 3.08.

In the village, the population was spread out, with 33.0% under the age of 18, 7.1% from 18 to 24, 28.3% from 25 to 44, 22.6% from 45 to 64, and 9.0% who were 65 years of age or older. The median age was 34 years. For every 100 females, there were 87.6 males. For every 100 females age 18 and over, there were 97.2 males.

The median income for a household in the village was $39,375, and the median income for a family was $46,042. Males had a median income of $30,179 versus $20,000 for females. The per capita income for the village was $17,907. 6.3% of the population and 1.8% of families were below the poverty line. 10.9% of those under the age of 18 and none of those 65 and older were living below the poverty line.

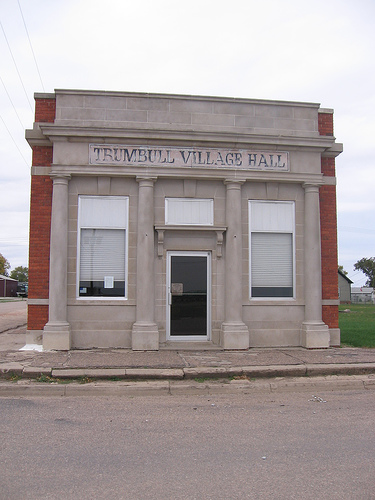
Trumbull Village Hall

== Education ==
Trumbull Schools consolidated with Doniphan Public schools in 2000 to form Doniphan-Trumbull Public Schools. All classes for grades kindergarten through 12th grade are taught at the School Building in Doniphan.

== Community Center ==
The village of Trumbull contains a community center where many events take place. Opportunities to rent different sections of the building are also available. The community center is recognized as the Trumbull Community Center and is owned by the Trumbull Community Center Corporation, which is a public charity organized in 2008 with an exemption from federal income tax under section 501(c)(3) of the Internal Revenue Code.

== Notable people ==
- Nelson M. Holderman, Medal of Honor recipient
- Fannie Wylie, Nebraska legislator

== See also ==
- List of municipalities in Nebraska
