= Clay Center, Nebraska =

- City
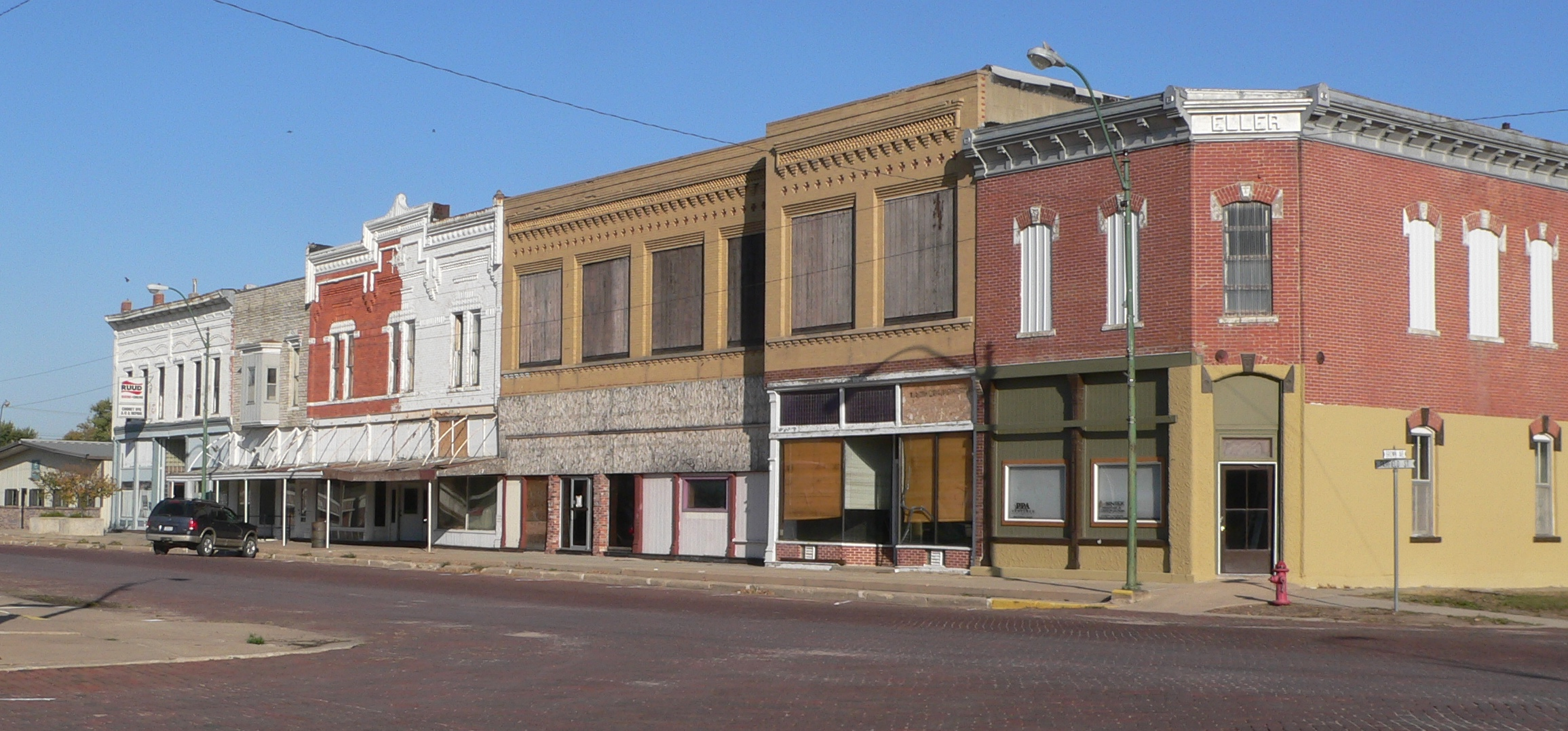
- Downtown Clay Center

- Location of Clay Center, Nebraska
- Coordinates: 40°31′32″N 98°03′18″W
- Country: United States
- State: Nebraska
- County: Clay

Government
  - Mayor: L. Wayne Johnson

Area
  - Total: 0.73 sq mi (1.89 km^{2})
  - Land: 0.73 sq mi (1.89 km^{2})
  - Water: 0 sq mi (0.00 km^{2})
- Elevation: 1,782 ft (543 m)

Population (2020)
  - Total: 735
  - Density: 1,005.3/sq mi (388.13/km^{2})
- Time zone: UTC-6 (Central (CST))
  - Summer (DST): UTC-5 (CDT)
- ZIP code: 68933
- Area code: 402
- FIPS code: 31-09375
- GNIS feature ID: 837923
- Website: claycenterne.com

Clay Center is a city in and the county seat of Clay County, Nebraska, United States. It is part of the Hastings, Nebraska Micropolitan Statistical Area. As of the 2020 census, Clay Center had a population of 735.

== History ==
Clay Center was laid out in 1879. The city was named after Henry Clay, a statesman from Kentucky. A post office has been in operation at Clay Center since 1879.

== Geography ==
According to the United States Census Bureau, the city has a total area of 0.72 square miles (1.86 km^{2}), all land.

=== Climate ===
Climate data for Clay Center, Nebraska (1991–2020 normals, extremes 1971–present)
Month	Jan	Feb	Mar	Apr	May	Jun	Jul	Aug	Sep	Oct	Nov	Dec	Year
Record high °F (°C)	76 (24)	80 (27)	89 (32)	95 (35)	99 (37)	106 (41)	106 (41)	107 (42)	102 (39)	95 (35)	84 (29)	76 (24)	107 (42)
Mean daily maximum °F (°C)	35.4 (1.9)	40.0 (4.4)	51.9 (11.1)	62.7 (17.1)	72.8 (22.7)	83.7 (28.7)	87.2 (30.7)	85.1 (29.5)	78.4 (25.8)	65.5 (18.6)	51.0 (10.6)	38.7 (3.7)	62.7 (17.1)
Daily mean °F (°C)	25.8 (−3.4)	29.6 (−1.3)	40.2 (4.6)	50.6 (10.3)	61.6 (16.4)	72.6 (22.6)	76.4 (24.7)	74.2 (23.4)	66.1 (18.9)	53.3 (11.8)	39.8 (4.3)	29.3 (−1.5)	51.6 (10.9)
Mean daily minimum °F (°C)	16.1 (−8.8)	19.3 (−7.1)	28.6 (−1.9)	38.5 (3.6)	50.4 (10.2)	61.4 (16.3)	65.7 (18.7)	63.3 (17.4)	53.9 (12.2)	41.0 (5.0)	28.6 (−1.9)	19.8 (−6.8)	40.6 (4.8)
Record low °F (°C)	−25 (−32)	−27 (−33)	−15 (−26)	3 (−16)	24 (−4)	35 (2)	42 (6)	42 (6)	21 (−6)	9 (−13)	−11 (−24)	−39 (−39)	−39 (−39)
Average precipitation inches (mm)	0.58 (15)	0.62 (16)	1.32 (34)	2.57 (65)	5.34 (136)	4.20 (107)	4.15 (105)	3.85 (98)	2.25 (57)	2.36 (60)	1.37 (35)	0.97 (25)	29.78 (756)
Average snowfall inches (cm)	4.5 (11)	5.9 (15)	1.5 (3.8)	1.4 (3.6)	0.0 (0.0)	0.0 (0.0)	0.0 (0.0)	0.0 (0.0)	0.0 (0.0)	0.4 (1.0)	1.5 (3.8)	3.3 (8.4)	18.5 (47)
Average precipitation days (≥ 0.01 in)	2.9	3.7	5.1	7.0	9.7	7.9	8.1	7.4	6.0	5.1	3.6	3.8	70.3
Average snowy days (≥ 0.1 in)	2.3	2.4	1.0	0.5	0.0	0.0	0.0	0.0	0.0	0.2	0.8	2.2	9.4
Source: NOAA

== Demographics ==
Historical population
Census	Pop.	Note	%±
1880	68		—
1890	390		473.5%
1900	590		51.3%
1910	1,065		80.5%
1920	965		−9.4%
1930	933		−3.3%
1940	715		−23.4%
1950	824		15.2%
1960	792		−3.9%
1970	952		20.2%
1980	962		1.1%
1990	825		−14.2%
2000	861		4.4%
2010	760		−11.7%
2020	735		−3.3%
U.S. Decennial Census

=== 2010 census ===
As of the census of 2010, there were 760 people, 332 households, and 214 families residing in the city. The population density was 1,055.6 inhabitants per square mile (407.6/km^{2}). There were 360 housing units at an average density of 500.0 per square mile (193.1/km^{2}). The racial makeup of the city was 95.4% White, 0.4% African American, 0.1% Asian, 2.2% from other races, and 1.8% from two or more races. Hispanic or Latino of any race were 4.6% of the population.

There were 332 households, of which 27.7% had children under the age of 18 living with them, 54.8% were married couples living together, 7.2% had a female householder with no husband present, 2.4% had a male householder with no wife present, and 35.5% were non-families. 32.8% of all households were made up of individuals, and 13.8% had someone living alone who was 65 years of age or older. The average household size was 2.27 and the average family size was 2.89.

The median age in the city was 42.8 years. 23.7% of residents were under the age of 18; 7.4% were between the ages of 18 and 24; 21.5% were from 25 to 44; 30.4% were from 45 to 64; and 17% were 65 years of age or older. The gender makeup of the city was 49.6% male and 50.4% female.

=== 2000 census ===
As of the census of 2000, there were 861 people, 343 households, and 243 families residing in the city. The population density was 1,215.3 inhabitants per square mile (469.2/km^{2}). There were 373 housing units at an average density of 526.5 per square mile (203.3/km^{2}). The racial makeup of the city was 96.17% White, 0.58% African American, 0.23% Native American, 0.93% Asian, 1.16% from other races, and 0.93% from two or more races. Hispanic or Latino of any race were 3.02% of the population.

There were 343 households, out of which 35.9% had children under the age of 18 living with them, 60.6% were married couples living together, 7.6% had a female householder with no husband present, and 28.9% were non-families. 27.4% of all households were made up of individuals, and 11.7% had someone living alone who was 65 years of age or older. The average household size was 2.50 and the average family size was 3.04.

In the city, the population was spread out, with 28.6% under the age of 18, 6.2% from 18 to 24, 25.7% from 25 to 44, 26.2% from 45 to 64, and 13.4% who were 65 years of age or older. The median age was 38 years. For every 100 females, there were 91.3 males. For every 100 females age 18 and over, there were 90.4 males.

As of 2000 the median income for a household in the city was $36,597, and the median income for a family was $45,893. Males had a median income of $30,982 versus $20,446 for females. The per capita income for the city was $17,577. About 7.6% of families and 9.1% of the population were below the poverty line, including 14.5% of those under age 18 and 1.7% of those age 65 or over.

== Education ==
Accredited "A" by the State Board of Education, Clay Center High School (CCHS) has an exceptional academic reputation with test scores consistently above the state and national averages.

The K-12 system enjoys a modern high school facility and gym. In the past five years, CCHS has earned five state championships in various sports. An experienced administration and staff provide an average 1 to 10 teacher-to-pupil ratio. Community scholarships are available to graduating seniors.

Served by Educational Service Unit No. 9 of Hastings, CCHS receives resources and expertise for its teachers and students.

Clay Center is located near several post-secondary institutions. It is one and one-half hours from the University of Nebraska–Lincoln and University of Nebraska at Kearney; one-half hour from Hastings College and the Mary Lanning School of Nursing, and 20 minutes from Central Community College in Hastings.

== Notable people ==
- Joseph D. Leitch, U.S. Army major general
- Abby Miller, actress
- Joe Saldana, race-car driver
- Howard Bradley Smith, (author)
