= Lewis Township, Clay County, Nebraska =

Lewis Township
- Township
- Location in Clay County
- Coordinates: 40°34′09″N 098°00′02″W
- Country: United States
- State: Nebraska
- County: Clay

Area
  - Total: 35.58 sq mi (92.16 km^{2})
  - Land: 35.56 sq mi (92.11 km^{2})
  - Water: 0.019 sq mi (0.05 km^{2}) 0.05%
- Elevation: 1,765 ft (538 m)

Population (2020)
  - Total: 125 ▼
  - Density: 4.4/sq mi (1.7/km^{2})
- GNIS feature ID: 0838085

Lewis Township is one of sixteen townships in Clay County, Nebraska, United States. The population was 125 at the 2020 census. A 2021 estimate placed the township's population at 125.

== See also ==
- County government in Nebraska
