= Fairfield, Nebraska =

- City
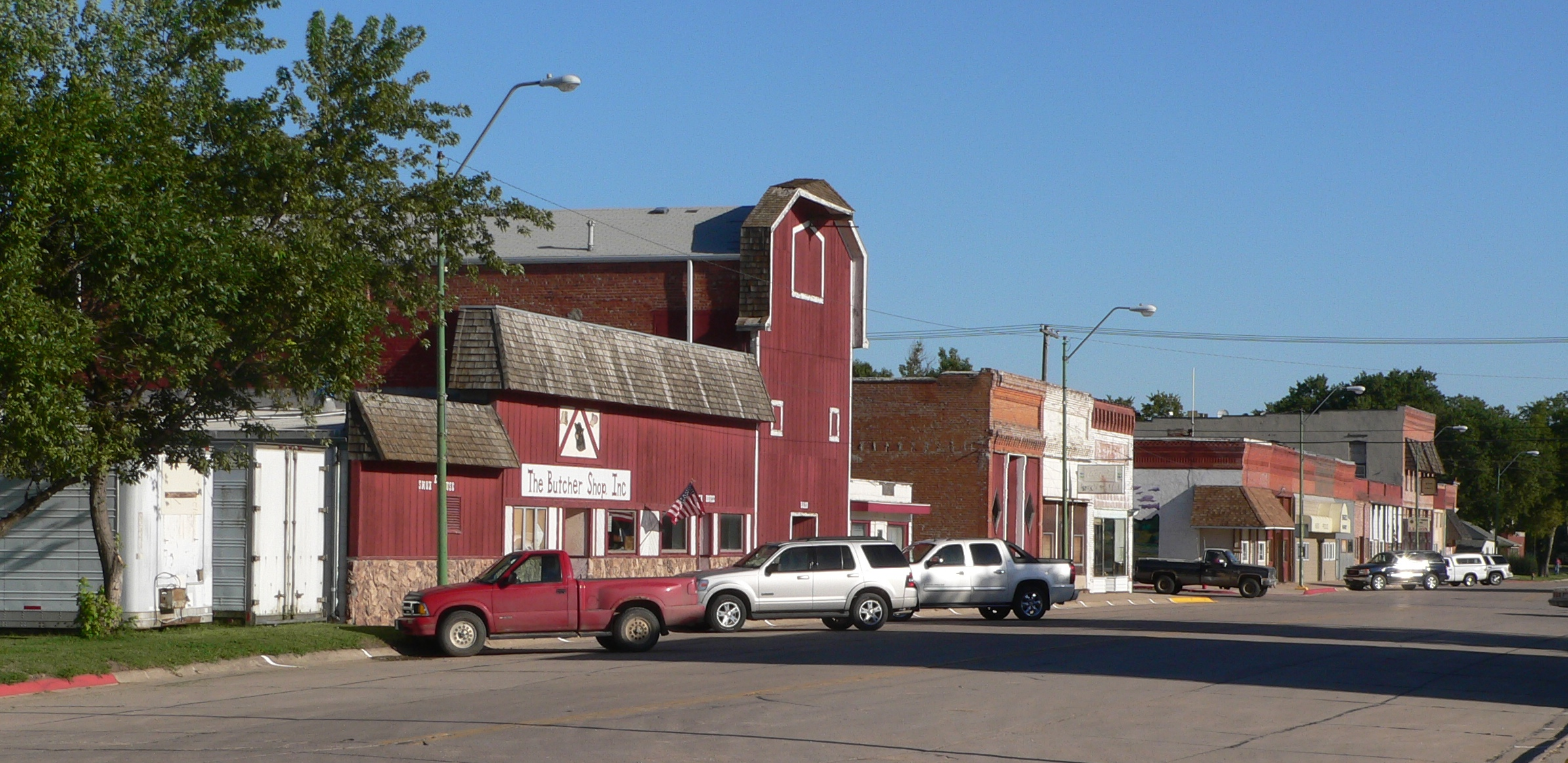
- Downtown Fairfield: D Street

- Location of Fairfield, Nebraska
- Coordinates: 40°25′56″N 98°06′12″W
- Country: United States
- State: Nebraska
- County: Clay

Area
  - Total: 0.72 sq mi (1.86 km^{2})
  - Land: 0.72 sq mi (1.86 km^{2})
  - Water: 0 sq mi (0.00 km^{2})
- Elevation: 1,778 ft (542 m)

Population (2020)
  - Total: 330
  - Density: 458.8/sq mi (177.16/km^{2})
- Time zone: UTC-6 (Central (CST))
  - Summer (DST): UTC-5 (CDT)
- ZIP code: 68938
- Area code: 402
- FIPS code: 31-16445
- GNIS feature ID: 2394733

Fairfield is a city in Clay County, Nebraska, United States. As of the 2020 census, Fairfield had a population of 330. It is part of the Hastings, Nebraska Micropolitan Statistical Area.

== History ==
Fairfield got its start in 1872 with the construction of the railroad through the territory.

== Geography ==
According to the United States Census Bureau, the city has a total area of 0.72 square miles (1.86 km^{2}), all land.

== Demographics ==
Historical population
Census	Pop.	Note	%±
1900	1,203		—
1910	1,054		−12.4%
1920	784		−25.6%
1930	757		−3.4%
1940	640		−15.5%
1950	503		−21.4%
1960	495		−1.6%
1970	487		−1.6%
1980	543		11.5%
1990	458		−15.7%
2000	467		2.0%
2010	387		−17.1%
2020	330		−14.7%
U.S. Decennial Census

=== 2010 census ===
As of the census of 2010, there were 387 people, 155 households, and 109 families living in the city. The population density was 537.5 inhabitants per square mile (207.5/km^{2}). There were 198 housing units at an average density of 275.0 per square mile (106.2/km^{2}). The racial makeup of the city was 99.2% White, 0.3% Native American, and 0.5% from two or more races. Hispanic or Latino people of any race were 0.8% of the population.

There were 155 households, of which 34.2% had children under the age of 18 living with them, 50.3% were married couples living together, 11.6% had a female householder with no husband present, 8.4% had a male householder with no wife present, and 29.7% were non-families. 27.1% of all households were made up of individuals, and 11.6% had someone living alone who was 65 years of age or older. The average household size was 2.50 and the average family size was 3.00.

The median age in the city was 40 years. 27.4% of residents were under the age of 18; 6.5% were between the ages of 18 and 24; 20.3% were from 25 to 44; 29.4% were from 45 to 64; and 16.3% were 65 years of age or older. The gender makeup of the city was 51.2% male and 48.8% female.

=== 2000 census ===
As of the census of 2000, there were 467 people, 185 households, and 132 families living in the city. The population density was 639.1 inhabitants per square mile (246.8/km^{2}). There were 213 housing units at an average density of 291.5 per square mile (112.5/km^{2}). The racial makeup of the city was 98.29% White, 0.21% African American, 0.21% Native American, and 1.28% from two or more races. Hispanic or Latino people of any race were 1.71% of the population.

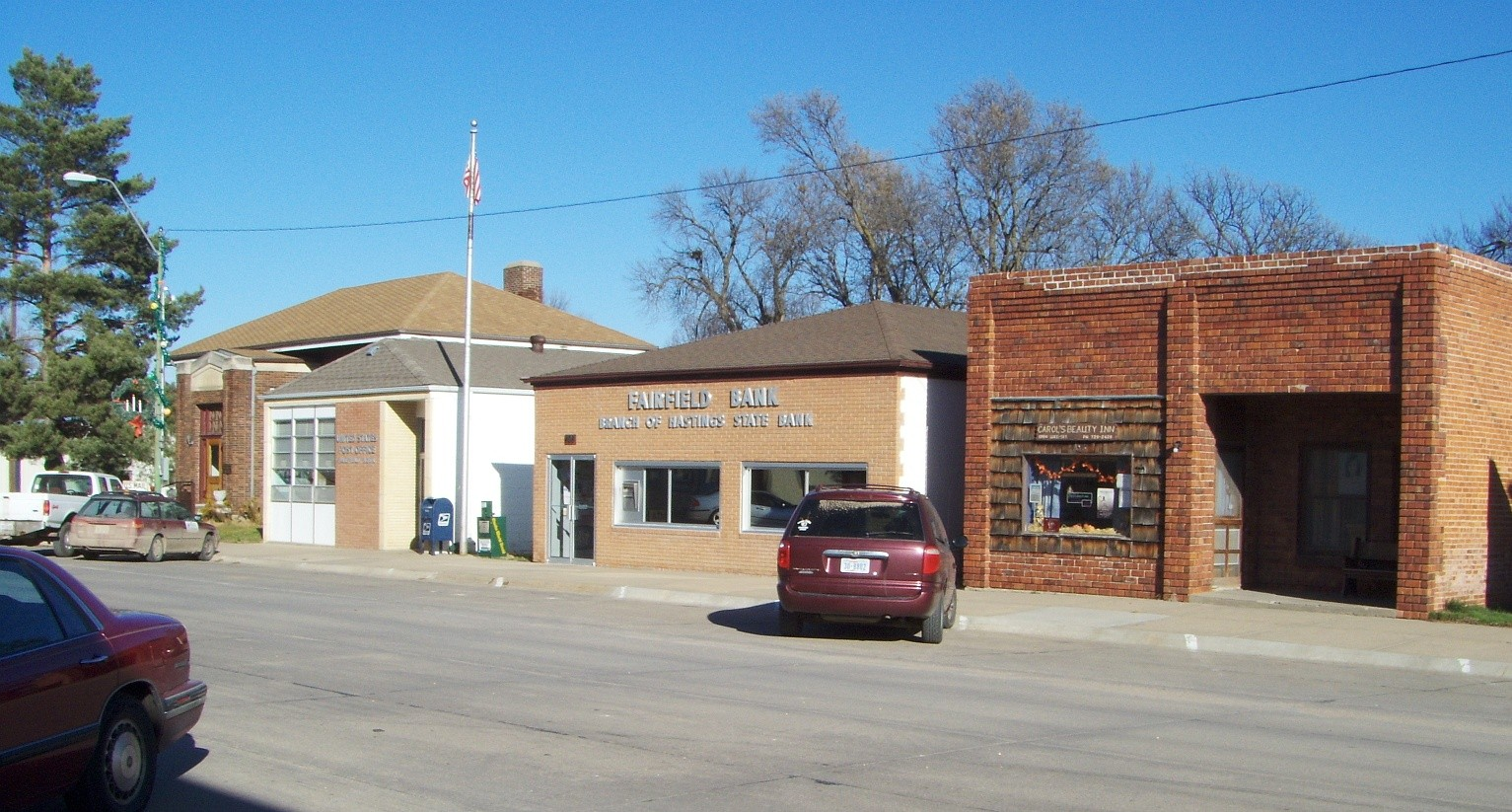
Closer view of D Street

There were 185 households, out of which 30.8% had children under the age of 18 living with them, 61.6% were married couples living together, 6.5% had a female householder with no husband present, and 28.6% were non-families. 25.9% of all households were made up of individuals, and 14.1% had someone living alone who was 65 years of age or older. The average household size was 2.52 and the average family size was 3.01.

In the city, the population was spread out, with 27.8% under the age of 18, 4.1% from 18 to 24, 27.6% from 25 to 44, 20.8% from 45 to 64, and 19.7% who were 65 years of age or older. The median age was 41 years. For every 100 females, there were 94.6 males. For every 100 females age 18 and over, there were 92.6 males.

The median income for a household in the city was $31,477, and the median income for a family was $37,000. Males had a median income of $26,806 versus $19,063 for females. The per capita income for the city was $15,815. About 12.3% of families and 15.3% of the population were below the poverty line, including 11.5% of those under age 18 and 12.1% of those age 65 or over.

== Education ==
Public education is provided by Sandy Creek Jr/Sr. High School. This school is home to a few notable programs like 74 Creative, FFA, CougarVision, Skills USA and NCAPS. Sandy Creek is an ESU 9 school.

== Notable person ==
- Samuel Roy McKelvie, 19th governor of Nebraska and the 13th lieutenant governor of Nebraska; born in Fairfield
