= Sheridan Township, Clay County, Nebraska =

Sheridan Township
- Township
- Location in Clay County
- Coordinates: 40°28′43″N 097°52′58″W
- Country: United States
- State: Nebraska
- County: Clay

Area
  - Total: 36.01 sq mi (93.27 km^{2})
  - Land: 36.01 sq mi (93.27 km^{2})
  - Water: 0 sq mi (0 km^{2}) 0%
- Elevation: 1,719 ft (524 m)

Population (2020)
  - Total: 77 ▼
  - Density: 2.6/sq mi (1/km^{2})
- GNIS feature ID: 0838243

Sheridan Township is one of sixteen townships in Clay County, Nebraska, United States. The population was 77 at the 2020 census. A 2021 estimate placed the township's population at 77.

== See also ==
- County government in Nebraska
