= Eldorado Township, Clay County, Nebraska =

Eldorado Township
- Township
- Location in Clay County
- Coordinates: 40°39′44″N 097°59′10″W
- Country: United States
- State: Nebraska
- County: Clay

Area
  - Total: 35.76 sq mi (92.61 km^{2})
  - Land: 35.76 sq mi (92.61 km^{2})
  - Water: 0 sq mi (0 km^{2}) 0%
- Elevation: 1,765 ft (538 m)

Population (2020)
  - Total: 96 ▼
  - Density: 4.1/sq mi (1.6/km^{2})
- GNIS feature ID: 0837977

Eldorado Township is one of sixteen townships in Clay County, Nebraska, United States. The population was 96 at the 2020 census. A 2021 estimate placed the township's population at 96.

== See also ==
- County government in Nebraska
