= Harvard Township, Clay County, Nebraska =

Harvard Township
- Township
- Location in Clay County
- Coordinates: 40°39′00″N 098°06′14″W
- Country: United States
- State: Nebraska
- County: Clay

Area
  - Total: 35.60 sq mi (92.21 km^{2})
  - Land: 35.59 sq mi (92.17 km^{2})
  - Water: 0.012 sq mi (0.03 km^{2}) 0.03%
- Elevation: 1,800 ft (550 m)

Population (2020)
  - Total: 1,085 ▼
  - Density: 32/sq mi (12.3/km^{2})
- ZIP code: 68944
- Area codes: 402 and 531
- GNIS feature ID: 0838050

Harvard Township is one of sixteen townships in Clay County, Nebraska, United States. The population was 1,085 at the 2020 census. A 2021 estimate placed the township's population at 1,085.

== See also ==
- County government in Nebraska
