= Sutton Township, Clay County, Nebraska =

Sutton Township
- Township
- Location in Clay County
- Coordinates: 40°33′56″N 097°52′40″W
- Country: United States
- State: Nebraska
- County: Clay

Area
  - Total: 34.60 sq mi (89.61 km^{2})
  - Land: 34.58 sq mi (89.55 km^{2})
  - Water: 0.027 sq mi (0.07 km^{2}) 0.08%
- Elevation: 1,745 ft (532 m)

Population (2020)
  - Total: 117 ▼
  - Density: 4.7/sq mi (1.8/km^{2})
- GNIS feature ID: 0838278

Sutton Township is one of sixteen townships in Clay County, Nebraska, United States. The population was 117 at the 2020 census. A 2021 estimate placed the township's population at 117.

== See also ==
- County government in Nebraska
