= Saronville, Nebraska =

- Village
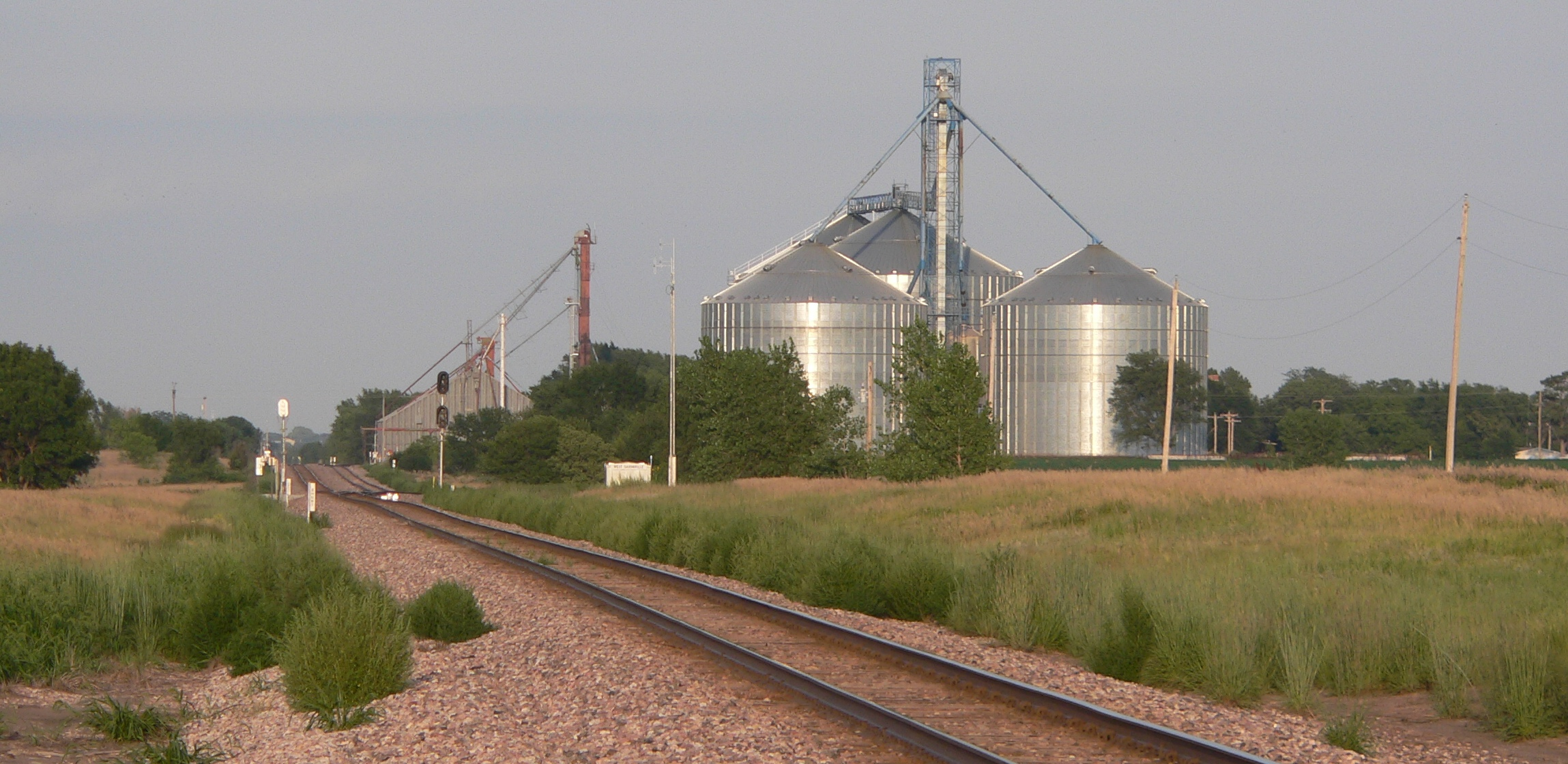
- Saronville, seen from the west

- Location of Saronville, Nebraska
- Coordinates: 40°36′10″N 97°56′20″W
- Country: United States
- State: Nebraska
- County: Clay

Area
  - Total: 0.15 sq mi (0.39 km^{2})
  - Land: 0.15 sq mi (0.39 km^{2})
  - Water: 0 sq mi (0.00 km^{2})
- Elevation: 1,749 ft (533 m)

Population (2020)
  - Total: 35
  - Estimate (2021): 35
  - Density: 230/sq mi (90/km^{2})
- Time zone: UTC-6 (Central (CST))
  - Summer (DST): UTC-5 (CDT)
- ZIP code: 68975
- Area code: 402
- FIPS code: 31-43755
- GNIS feature ID: 2399186

Saronville is a village in Clay County, Nebraska, United States. The population was 35 at the 2020 census. It is part of the Hastings, Nebraska Micropolitan Statistical Area.

== History ==
Saronville was founded in 1882 when the railroad was extended to that point. A majority of the early settlers being natives of Sweden caused the name Saron to be selected, after a Swedish village.

== Geography ==
According to the United States Census Bureau, the village has a total area of 0.15 square miles (0.39 km^{2}), all land.

== Demographics ==
Historical population
| Census | Pop. | Note | %± |
|---|---|---|---|
| 1920 | 141 | | — |
| 1930 | 148 | | 5.0% |
| 1940 | 124 | | −16.2% |
| 1950 | 87 | | −29.8% |
| 1960 | 71 | | −18.4% |
| 1970 | 74 | | 4.2% |
| 1980 | 63 | | −14.9% |
| 1990 | 38 | | −39.7% |
| 2000 | 61 | | 60.5% |
| 2010 | 47 | | −23.0% |
| 2020 | 35 | | −25.5% |
| 2021 (est.) | 35 | Steady | 0.0% |
U.S. Decennial Census

=== 2010 census ===
As of the census of 2010, there were 47 people, 18 households, and 13 families residing in the village. The population density was 313.3 inhabitants per square mile (121.0/km^{2}). There were 19 housing units at an average density of 126.7 per square mile (48.9/km^{2}). The racial makeup of the village was 97.9% White and 2.1% from two or more races. Hispanic or Latino of any race were 8.5% of the population.

There were 18 households, of which 27.8% had children under the age of 18 living with them, 66.7% were married couples living together, 5.6% had a male householder with no wife present, and 27.8% were non-families. 22.2% of all households were made up of individuals, and 5.6% had someone living alone who was 65 years of age or older. The average household size was 2.61 and the average family size was 3.15.

The median age in the village was 34.5 years. 21.3% of residents were under the age of 18; 17.1% were between the ages of 18 and 24; 16.9% were from 25 to 44; 21.3% were from 45 to 64; and 23.4% were 65 years of age or older. The gender makeup of the village was 51.1% male and 48.9% female.

=== 2000 census ===
As of the census of 2000, there were 61 people, 20 households, and 15 families residing in the village. The population density was 416.4 inhabitants per square mile (160.8/km^{2}). There were 20 housing units at an average density of 136.5 per square mile (52.7/km^{2}). The racial makeup of the village was 96.72% White, 1.64% African American, 1.64% from other races. Hispanic or Latino of any race were 1.64% of the population.

There were 20 households, out of which 45.0% had children under the age of 18 living with them, 65.0% were married couples living together, 10.0% had a female householder with no husband present, and 25.0% were non-families. 25.0% of all households were made up of individuals, and 10.0% had someone living alone who was 65 years of age or older. The average household size was 3.05 and the average family size was 3.73.

In the village, the population was spread out, with 37.7% under the age of 18, 8.2% from 18 to 24, 24.6% from 25 to 44, 14.8% from 45 to 64, and 14.8% who were 65 years of age or older. The median age was 32 years. For every 100 females, there were 79.4 males. For every 100 females age 18 and over, there were 100.0 males.

As of 2000 the median income for a household in the village was $30,000, and the median income for a family was $31,250. Males had a median income of $31,250 versus $21,250 for females. The per capita income for the village was $10,507. There were 23.5% of families and 18.6% of the population living below the poverty line, including 22.7% of under eighteens and 14.3% of those over 64.
