= Lynn Township, Clay County, Nebraska =

Lynn Township
- Township
- Location in Clay County
- Coordinates: 40°34′01″N 098°06′11″W
- Country: United States
- State: Nebraska
- County: Clay

Area
  - Total: 35.55 sq mi (92.08 km^{2})
  - Land: 35.55 sq mi (92.08 km^{2})
  - Water: 0 sq mi (0 km^{2}) 0%
- Elevation: 1,778 ft (542 m)

Population (2020)
  - Total: 70 ▼
  - Density: 2.6/sq mi (1/km^{2})
- GNIS feature ID: 0838120

Lynn Township is one of sixteen townships in Clay County, Nebraska, United States. The population was 70 at the 2020 census. A 2021 estimate placed the township's population at 70.

== See also ==
- County government in Nebraska
