= School Creek Township, Clay County, Nebraska =

School Creek Township
- Township
- Location in Clay County
- Coordinates: 40°38′57″N 097°53′21″W
- Country: United States
- State: Nebraska
- County: Clay

Area
  - Total: 35.62 sq mi (92.25 km^{2})
  - Land: 35.62 sq mi (92.25 km^{2})
  - Water: 0 sq mi (0 km^{2}) 0%
- Elevation: 1,740 ft (530 m)

Population (2020)
  - Total: 147 ▼
  - Density: 4.4/sq mi (1.7/km^{2})
- ZIP code: 68979
- Area codes: 402 and 531
- GNIS feature ID: 0838235

School Creek Township is one of sixteen townships in Clay County, Nebraska, United States. The population was 147 at the 2020 census. A 2021 estimate placed the township's population at 146.

== See also ==
- County government in Nebraska
