= Sedan, Nebraska =

Unincorporated community in Nebraska, U.S.

Coordinates: 40.34251°N 97.89726°W

Sedan is an unincorporated community in Nuckolls County, Nebraska, United States.

== History ==
A post office named Coy was established at Sedan in 1900, before later being renamed Sedan in 1906, and remained in operation until it was discontinued in 1951. It was named after Sedan, in France. This naming was chosen by the Burlington and Missouri River Railroad, which established the settlement.
