= Lone Tree Township, Clay County, Nebraska =

Lone Tree Township
- Township
- Location in Clay County
- Coordinates: 40°28′35″N 098°05′59″W
- Country: United States
- State: Nebraska
- County: Clay

Area
  - Total: 35.72 sq mi (92.52 km^{2})
  - Land: 35.40 sq mi (91.68 km^{2})
  - Water: 0.33 sq mi (0.85 km^{2}) 0.92%
- Elevation: 1,788 ft (545 m)

Population (2020)
  - Total: 91 ▼
  - Density: 3.6/sq mi (1.4/km^{2})
- GNIS feature ID: 0838110

Lone Tree Township is one of sixteen townships in Clay County, Nebraska, United States. The population was 91 at the 2020 census. A 2021 estimate placed the township's population at 91.

== See also ==
- County government in Nebraska
