= Glenvil Township, Clay County, Nebraska =

Glenvil Township
- Township
- Location in Clay County
- Coordinates: 40°29′07″N 098°13′54″W
- Country: United States
- State: Nebraska
- County: Clay

Area
  - Total: 35.70 sq mi (92.45 km^{2})
  - Land: 35.70 sq mi (92.45 km^{2})
  - Water: 0 sq mi (0 km^{2}) 0%
- Elevation: 1,831 ft (558 m)

Population (2020)
  - Total: 391 ▼
  - Density: 13/sq mi (5/km^{2})
- GNIS feature ID: 0838027

Glenvil Township is one of sixteen townships in Clay County, Nebraska, United States. The population was 391 at the 2020 census. A 2021 estimate placed the township's population at 389.

== See also ==
- County government in Nebraska
