= Fairfield Township, Clay County, Nebraska =

Fairfield Township
- Township
- Location in Clay County
- Coordinates: 40°23′28″N 098°06′33″W
- Country: United States
- State: Nebraska
- County: Clay

Area
  - Total: 36.13 sq mi (93.58 km^{2})
  - Land: 36.12 sq mi (93.55 km^{2})
  - Water: 0.012 sq mi (0.03 km^{2}) 0.03%
- Elevation: 1,762 ft (537 m)

Population (2020)
  - Total: 516 ▼
  - Density: 20/sq mi (7.6/km^{2})
- GNIS feature ID: 0837999

Fairfield Township is one of sixteen townships in Clay County, Nebraska, United States. The population was 516 at the 2020 census. A 2021 estimate placed the township's population at 512.

== See also ==
- County government in Nebraska
