= Marshall Township, Clay County, Nebraska =

Marshall Township
- Township
- Location in Clay County
- Coordinates: 40°28′26″N 097°59′08″W
- Country: United States
- State: Nebraska
- County: Clay

Area
  - Total: 35.8 sq mi (92.6 km^{2})
  - Land: 35.8 sq mi (92.6 km^{2})
  - Water: 0 sq mi (0 km^{2}) 0%
- Elevation: 1,770 ft (540 m)

Population (2020)
  - Total: 54 ▼
  - Density: 1.6/sq mi (0.6/km^{2})
- GNIS feature ID: 0838130

Marshall Township is one of sixteen townships in Clay County, Nebraska, United States. The population was fifty- four (54) at the 2020 census. A 2021 estimate placed the township's population at 54. Marshall Township, NE is a Very High Risk area for tornados. According to records, the largest tornado in the Marshall Township area was an F5 in 1964 that caused 50 injuries and 4 deaths. There have been 250 tornadoes since 1950, with an average of 3 tornadoes a year. The county has a significantly lower crime rate than the country as a whole and a mere 3.1% unemployment.

== See also ==
- County government in Nebraska
