= Spring Ranch Township, Clay County, Nebraska =

Spring Ranch Township
- Township
- Location in Clay County
- Coordinates: 40°23′29″N 098°13′13″W
- Country: United States
- State: Nebraska
- County: Clay

Area
  - Total: 35.63 sq mi (92.28 km^{2})
  - Land: 35.63 sq mi (92.28 km^{2})
  - Water: 0 sq mi (0 km^{2}) 0%
- Elevation: 1,703 ft (519 m)

Population (2020)
  - Total: 150 ▼
  - Density: 4.9/sq mi (1.9/km^{2})
- GNIS feature ID: 0838269

Spring Ranch Township is one of sixteen townships in Clay County, Nebraska, United States. The population was 150 at the 2020 census. A 2021 estimate placed the township's population at 149.

== See also ==
- County government in Nebraska
- Spring Ranch, Nebraska, a Clay County ghost town
