= Edgar Township, Clay County, Nebraska =

Edgar Township
- Township
- Location in Clay County
- Coordinates: 40°23′31″N 098°00′02″W
- Country: United States
- State: Nebraska
- County: Clay

Area
  - Total: 35.97 sq mi (93.16 km^{2})
  - Land: 35.93 sq mi (93.06 km^{2})
  - Water: 0.039 sq mi (0.1 km^{2}) 0.11%
- Elevation: 1,729 ft (527 m)

Population (2020)
  - Total: 501
  - Density: 18/sq mi (6.9/km^{2})
- ZIP code: 68935
- Area codes: 402 and 531
- GNIS feature ID: 0837976

Edgar Township is one of sixteen townships in Clay County, Nebraska, United States. The population was 501 at the 2020 census. A 2021 estimate placed the township's population at 498.

== See also ==
- County government in Nebraska
