= Belle Prairie Township, Fillmore County, Nebraska =

Belle Prairie Township
- Township
- Location in Fillmore County
- Coordinates: 40°23′40″N 097°32′18″W
- Country: United States
- State: Nebraska
- County: Fillmore

Area
  - Total: 36.0 sq mi (93.2 km^{2})
  - Land: 36.0 sq mi (93.2 km^{2})
  - Water: 0 sq mi (0 km^{2}) 0%
- Elevation: 1,578 ft (481 m)

Population (2020)
  - Total: 114 ▼
  - Density: 3.17/sq mi (1.22/km^{2})
- GNIS feature ID: 0837875

Belle Prairie Township is one of fifteen townships in Fillmore County, Nebraska, United States. The population was 114 at the 2020 census.

The village of Strang lies within the township.
