= Inland Township, Clay County, Nebraska =

Inland Township
- Township
- Location in Clay County
- Coordinates: 40°34′06″N 098°13′17″W
- Country: United States
- State: Nebraska
- County: Clay

Area
  - Total: 35.67 sq mi (92.38 km^{2})
  - Land: 35.65 sq mi (92.34 km^{2})
  - Water: 0.015 sq mi (0.04 km^{2}) 0.04%
- Elevation: 1,847 ft (563 m)

Population (2020)
  - Total: 100 ▼
  - Density: 3.1/sq mi (1.2/km^{2})
- GNIS feature ID: 0838067

Inland Township is one of sixteen townships in Clay County, Nebraska, United States. The population was 100 at the 20020 census. A 2021 estimate placed the township's population at 99.

== See also ==
- County government in Nebraska
