= Clay County, Nebraska =

County in Nebraska, United States

- County
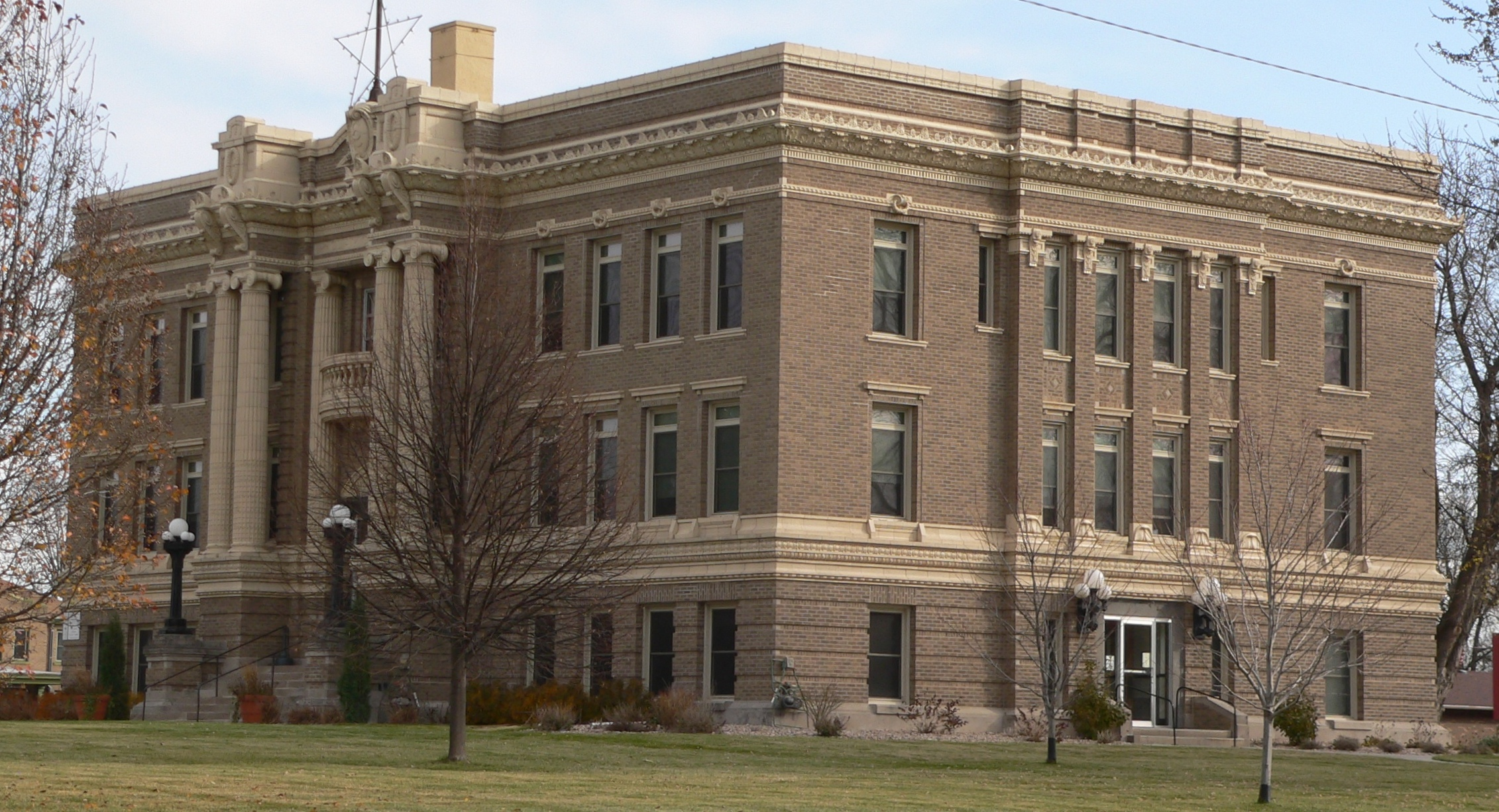
- Clay County Courthouse in Clay Center

- Location within the U.S. state of Nebraska
- Coordinates: 40°31′N 98°03′W
- Country: United States
- State: Nebraska
- Founded: 1855 (authorized); 1871 (organized)
- Named for: Henry Clay
- Seat: Clay Center
- Largest city: Sutton

Area
  - Total: 574 sq mi (1,490 km^{2})
  - Land: 572 sq mi (1,480 km^{2})
  - Water: 1.2 sq mi (3.1 km^{2}) 0.2%

Population (2020)
  - Total: 6,104
  - Estimate (2025): 6,170 ▲
  - Density: 11/sq mi (4.2/km^{2})
- Time zone: UTC−6 (Central)
  - Summer (DST): UTC−5 (CDT)
- Congressional district: 3rd
- Website: www.claycounty.ne.gov

Clay County is a county in the U.S. state of Nebraska. As of the 2020 United States census, the population was 6,104. Its county seat is Clay Center. The county was formed in 1855, and was organized in 1871. It was named for Henry Clay, a member of the United States Senate from Kentucky, who went on to become United States Secretary of State. In the Nebraska license plate system, Clay County is represented by the prefix 30 (it had the 30th-largest number of vehicles registered in the county when the license plate system was established in 1922).

== Geography ==
According to the US Census Bureau, the county has an area of 574 square miles (1,490 km^{2}), of which 572 square miles (1,480 km^{2}) is land and 1.2 square miles (3.1 km^{2}) (0.2%) is water.

=== Major highways ===
- U.S. Highway 6
- Nebraska Highway 14
- Nebraska Highway 41
- Nebraska Highway 74

=== Adjacent counties ===
- York County – northeast
- Fillmore County – east
- Thayer County – southeast
- Nuckolls County – south
- Webster County – southwest
- Adams County – west
- Hamilton County – north

=== Protected areas ===
- Alberding Lagoon National Wildlife Management Area
- Bluewing Wildlife Management Area
- Eckhardt Lagoon National Wildlife Management Area
- Green Wing State Wildlife Management Area
- Hansen Lagoon National Wildlife Management Area
- Harms Federal Waterfowl Production Area
- Hultine Federal Waterfowl Production Area
- Kissinger Basin State Wildlife Management Area
- Lange Lagoon National Wildlife Management Area
- Massie Federal Waterfowl Production Area
- Meadowlark Federal Waterfowl Production Area
- Moger Lagoon National Wildlife Management Area
- Sandpiper Federal Waterfowl Production Area
- Schuck Federal Waterfowl Production Area
- Smith Lagoon National Wildlife Management Area
- White Front Wildlife Management Area

== Demographics ==
Historical population
Census	Pop.	Note	%±
1860	165		—
1870	54		−67.3%
1880	11,294		20,814.8%
1890	16,310		44.4%
1900	15,735		−3.5%
1910	15,729		0.0%
1920	14,486		−7.9%
1930	13,571		−6.3%
1940	10,445		−23.0%
1950	8,700		−16.7%
1960	8,717		0.2%
1970	8,266		−5.2%
1980	8,106		−1.9%
1990	7,213		−11.0%
2000	7,039		−2.4%
2010	6,542		−7.1%
2020	6,104		−6.7%
2025 (est.)	6,170	▲	1.1%
US Decennial Census; 1790-1960 1900-1990; 1990-2000 2010

=== 2020 census ===
As of the 2020 census, the county had a population of 6,104. The median age was 42.8 years. 24.2% of residents were under the age of 18 and 22.2% of residents were 65 years of age or older. For every 100 females there were 103.2 males, and for every 100 females age 18 and over there were 103.4 males age 18 and over.

The racial makeup of the county was 90.1% White, 0.2% Black or African American, 0.6% American Indian and Alaska Native, 0.2% Asian, 0.0% Native Hawaiian and Pacific Islander, 3.9% from some other race, and 5.1% from two or more races. Hispanic or Latino residents of any race comprised 8.6% of the population.

0.0% of residents lived in urban areas, while 100.0% lived in rural areas.

There were 2,509 households in the county, of which 29.3% had children under the age of 18 living with them and 19.1% had a female householder with no spouse or partner present. About 28.0% of all households were made up of individuals and 13.1% had someone living alone who was 65 years of age or older.

There were 2,817 housing units, of which 10.9% were vacant. Among occupied housing units, 78.5% were owner-occupied and 21.5% were renter-occupied. The homeowner vacancy rate was 3.0% and the rental vacancy rate was 8.9%.

=== 2000 census ===
As of the 2000 United States census, there were 7,039 people, 2,756 households, and 1,981 families in the county. The population density was 12 people per square mile (4.6 people/km^{2}). There were 3,066 housing units at an average density of 5 per square mile (1.9/km^{2}). The racial makeup of the county was 97.57% White, 0.17% Black or African American, 0.31% Native American, 0.30% Asian, 1.24% from other races, and 0.41% from two or more races. 3.48% of the population were Hispanic or Latino of any race. 49.4% were of German, 7.2% English, 7.2% American, 5.4% Swedish and 5.3% Irish ancestry.

There were 2,756 households, out of which 32.90% had children under the age of 18 living with them, 63.70% were married couples living together, 5.50% had a female householder with no husband present, and 28.10% were non-families. 25.70% of all households were made up of individuals, and 13.10% had someone living alone who was 65 years of age or older. The average household size was 2.52 and the average family size was 3.03.

The county population contained 27.30% under the age of 18, 5.90% from 18 to 24, 25.30% from 25 to 44, 23.60% from 45 to 64, and 18.00% who were 65 years of age or older. The median age was 40 years. For every 100 females, there were 95.10 males. For every 100 females age 18 and over, there were 95.00 males.

The median income for a household in the county was $34,259, and the median income for a family was $39,541. Males had a median income of $28,321 versus $19,870 for females. The per capita income for the county was $16,870. About 8.50% of families and 10.40% of the population were below the poverty line, including 13.40% of those under age 18 and 6.60% of those age 65 or over.

== Communities ==
=== Cities ===
- Clay Center (county seat)
- Edgar
- Fairfield
- Harvard
- Sutton

=== Villages ===
- Deweese
- Glenvil
- Ong
- Saronville
- Trumbull

=== Census-designated place ===
- Inland

=== Unincorporated communities ===
- Eldorado
- Verona

=== Townships ===
- Edgar
- Eldorado
- Fairfield
- Glenvil
- Harvard
- Inland
- Leicester
- Lewis
- Logan
- Lone Tree
- Lynn
- Marshall
- School Creek
- Sheridan
- Spring Ranch
- Sutton

== Politics ==
Clay County voters are reliably Republican. In only one national election since 1936 has the county selected the Democratic Party candidate.

United States presidential election results for Clay County, Nebraska
Year	Republican		Democratic		Third party(ies)	
Year	No.	%	No.	%	No.	%
1900	1,932	50.46%	1,826	47.69%	71	1.85%
1904	2,118	59.48%	701	19.69%	742	20.84%
1908	1,891	47.80%	1,939	49.01%	126	3.19%
1912	557	15.23%	1,694	46.31%	1,407	38.46%
1916	1,737	45.46%	1,975	51.69%	109	2.85%
1920	3,392	67.73%	1,466	29.27%	150	3.00%
1924	2,758	50.32%	1,716	31.31%	1,007	18.37%
1928	4,105	69.27%	1,767	29.82%	54	0.91%
1932	2,320	36.39%	3,878	60.82%	178	2.79%
1936	2,856	48.26%	2,932	49.54%	130	2.20%
1940	3,576	66.98%	1,763	33.02%	0	0.00%
1944	3,375	68.81%	1,530	31.19%	0	0.00%
1948	2,511	61.24%	1,589	38.76%	0	0.00%
1952	3,559	76.14%	1,115	23.86%	0	0.00%
1956	3,099	71.42%	1,240	28.58%	0	0.00%
1960	3,005	69.30%	1,331	30.70%	0	0.00%
1964	1,879	48.43%	2,001	51.57%	0	0.00%
1968	2,273	66.58%	935	27.39%	206	6.03%
1972	2,542	74.70%	861	25.30%	0	0.00%
1976	2,254	60.87%	1,369	36.97%	80	2.16%
1980	2,739	71.63%	840	21.97%	245	6.41%
1984	2,920	77.74%	811	21.59%	25	0.67%
1988	2,352	67.78%	1,097	31.61%	21	0.61%
1992	1,824	50.84%	802	22.35%	962	26.81%
1996	1,982	59.86%	880	26.58%	449	13.56%
2000	2,326	72.35%	774	24.07%	115	3.58%
2004	2,543	76.21%	743	22.27%	51	1.53%
2008	2,177	71.78%	780	25.72%	76	2.51%
2012	2,232	75.74%	667	22.63%	48	1.63%
2016	2,422	79.02%	477	15.56%	166	5.42%
2020	2,848	79.78%	632	17.70%	90	2.52%
2024	2,677	80.66%	577	17.38%	65	1.96%

== See also ==
- National Register of Historic Places listings in Clay County, Nebraska
