= Logan Township, Clay County, Nebraska =

Logan Township
- Township
- Location in Clay County
- Coordinates: 40°23′39″N 097°52′54″W
- Country: United States
- State: Nebraska
- County: Clay

Area
  - Total: 36.21 sq mi (93.78 km^{2})
  - Land: 36.17 sq mi (93.68 km^{2})
  - Water: 0.039 sq mi (0.1 km^{2}) 0.11%
- Elevation: 1,690 ft (515 m)

Population (2020)
  - Total: 106 ▼
  - Density: 3.9/sq mi (1.5/km^{2})
- GNIS feature ID: 0838103

Logan Township is one of sixteen townships in Clay County, Nebraska, United States. The population was 106 at the 2020 census. A 2021 estimate placed the township's population at 106.

== See also ==
- County government in Nebraska
