= Ong, Nebraska =

- Village
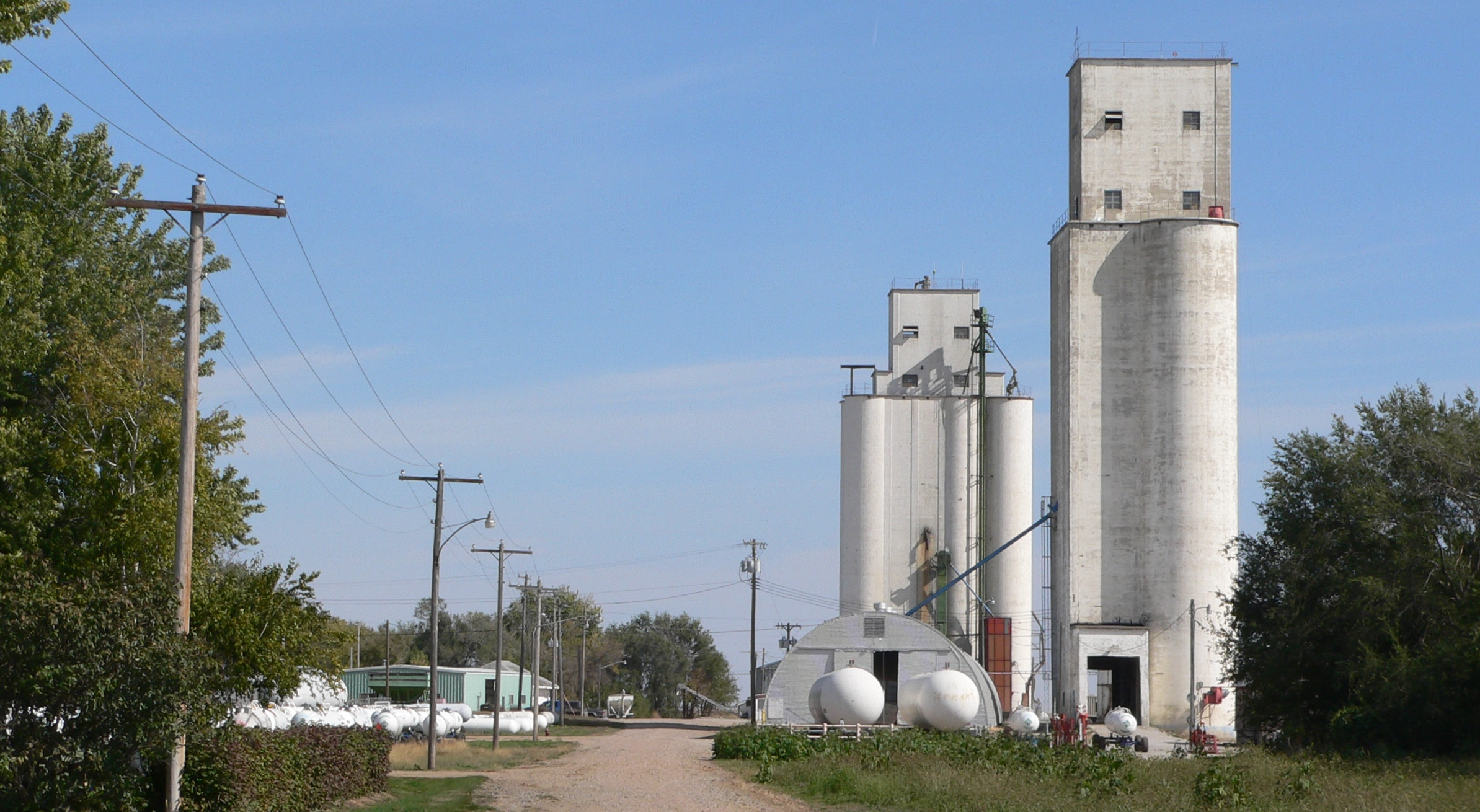
- Grain elevators in Ong

- Location of Ong, Nebraska
- Coordinates: 40°23′54″N 97°50′21″W
- Country: United States
- State: Nebraska
- County: Clay

Area
  - Total: 0.29 sq mi (0.74 km^{2})
  - Land: 0.29 sq mi (0.74 km^{2})
  - Water: 0 sq mi (0.00 km^{2})
- Elevation: 1,683 ft (513 m)

Population (2020)
  - Total: 49
  - Estimate (2021): 49
  - Density: 170/sq mi (66/km^{2})
- Time zone: UTC-6 (Central (CST))
  - Summer (DST): UTC-5 (CDT)
- ZIP code: 68452
- Area code: 402
- FIPS code: 31-37140
- GNIS feature ID: 2399576

Ong is a village in Clay County, Nebraska, United States. The population was 49 at the 2020 census. It is part of the Hastings, Nebraska Micropolitan Statistical Area.

== History ==
Ong was platted in 1886 when the Burlington and Missouri River Railroad was extended to that point. It was named for Judge Joseph Eli Ong (1845-1912), the original owner of the town site.

== Geography ==
According to the United States Census Bureau, the village has a total area of 0.29 square miles (0.75 km^{2}), all land.

== Demographics ==
Historical population
Census	Pop.	Note	%±
1910	285		—
1920	265		−7.0%
1930	250		−5.7%
1940	193		−22.8%
1950	173		−10.4%
1960	128		−26.0%
1970	129		0.8%
1980	104		−19.4%
1990	69		−33.7%
2000	67		−2.9%
2010	63		−6.0%
2020	49		−22.2%
2021 (est.)	49	Steady	0.0%
U.S. Decennial Census

=== 2010 census ===
At the 2010 census there were 63 people, 32 households, and 17 families in the village. The population density was 217.2 inhabitants per square mile (83.9/km^{2}). There were 41 housing units at an average density of 141.4 per square mile (54.6/km^{2}). The racial makeup of the village was 100.0% White. Hispanic or Latino of any race were 3.2%.

Of the 32 households 18.8% had children under the age of 18 living with them, 40.6% were married couples living together, 12.5% had a female householder with no husband present, and 46.9% were non-families. 37.5% of households were one person and 12.5% were one person aged 65 or older. The average household size was 1.97 and the average family size was 2.53.

The median age in the village was 50.5 years. 17.5% of residents were under the age of 18; 3.2% were between the ages of 18 and 24; 19.1% were from 25 to 44; 42.8% were from 45 to 64; and 17.5% were 65 or older. The gender makeup of the village was 46.0% male and 54.0% female.

=== 2000 census ===
As of the census of 2000, there were 67 people, 34 households, and 17 families in the village. The population density was 238.4 inhabitants per square mile (92.0/km^{2}). There were 42 housing units at an average density of 149.4 per square mile (57.7/km^{2}). The racial makeup of the village was 100.00% White.

Of the 34 households 17.6% had children under the age of 18 living with them, 50.0% were married couples living together, and 47.1% were non-families. 44.1% of households were one person and 20.6% were one person aged 65 or older. The average household size was 1.97 and the average family size was 2.78.

The age distribution was 20.9% under the age of 18, 23.9% from 25 to 44, 31.3% from 45 to 64, and 23.9% 65 or older. The median age was 46 years. For every 100 females, there were 97.1 males. For every 100 females age 18 and over, there were 89.3 males.

The median household income was $30,417, and the median family income was $16,250. Males had a median income of $26,250 versus $26,250 for females. The per capita income for the village was $19,871. There were 36.4% of families and 28.8% of the population living below the poverty line, including 53.8% of under eighteens and none of those over 64.
