= Cottonwood Township, Nebraska =

Cottonwood Township, Nebraska may refer to the following places in Nebraska:

- Cottonwood Township, Adams County, Nebraska
- Cottonwood Township, Nance County, Nebraska
- Cottonwood Township, Phelps County, Nebraska

== See also ==
- Cottonwood Township (disambiguation)
