= National Register of Historic Places listings in Adams County, Nebraska =

Location of Adams County in Nebraska

Adams County, Nebraska, United States, has 22 properties and districts listed on the National Register of Historic Places. There are also two former listings.

The locations of National Register properties and districts for which the latitude and longitude coordinates are included below may be seen on a map.

This National Park Service list is complete through NPS recent listings posted October 30, 2026.

== Current listings ==
	Name on the Register	Image	Date listed	Location	City or town	Description
1	William Brach House	William Brach House	February 1, 1979 (#79001429)	823 N. Lincoln Ave. 40°35′33″N 98°23′27″W	Hastings	
2	Burlington Station	Burlington Station	March 29, 1978 (#78001693)	1st St. and St. Joseph Ave. 40°35′02″N 98°23′13″W	Hastings	
3	Central Hastings Historic District	Central Hastings Historic District	August 21, 2003 (#03000795)	Roughly 7th to 12th; Colorado Ave. to Bellevue Ave. 40°35′35″N 98°23′23″W	Hastings	
4	Chautauqua Pavilion	Chautauqua Pavilion	October 19, 1978 (#78001692)	Chautauqua Park; 40°35′14″N 98°24′44″W	Hastings	
5	Clarke Hotel	Clarke Hotel	December 7, 1987 (#87002094)	233 N. Hastings Ave. 40°35′09″N 98°23′24″W	Hastings	
6	Farrell Block	Farrell Block	May 1, 1979 (#79001430)	533-537 2nd St., and 112 Denver Ave. 40°35′06″N 98°23′17″W	Hastings	
7	Foote Clinic	Foote Clinic	March 22, 2016 (#16000104)	422 N. Hastings Ave. 40°35′16″N 98°23′23″W	Hastings	
8	Hastings Brewery Building and Bottling Works	Hastings Brewery Building and Bottling Works	June 30, 2015 (#15000391)	219 W. 2nd St. 40°35′06″N 98°23′02″W	Hastings	
9	Hastings College	Hastings College	July 31, 2017 (#100001393)	710 N. Turner Ave. 40°35′26″N 98°22′29″W	Hastings	
10	Hastings Downtown Historic District		December 18, 2018 (#100003090)	Roughly bounded by W 3rd St., Burlington Northern RR, N Colorado & N Burlington Aves. 40°35′07″N 98°23′19″W	Hastings	
11	Hastings Masonic Temple	Hastings Masonic Temple	October 31, 2024 (#100010947)	411 North Hastings Avenue; 40°35′15″N 98°23′24″W	Hastings	
12	Hastings Municipal Airport Hangar-Building No. 1	Hastings Municipal Airport Hangar-Building No. 1	July 22, 2005 (#05000722)	3100 E. 12th St. 40°35′51″N 98°25′33″W	Hastings	
13	Heartwell Park Historic District	Heartwell Park Historic District	March 9, 2000 (#00000168)	105-106 Lakeside Dr., 110-602 Forest Boulevard, and 923 and 1109 N. Elm St. 40°35′43″N 98°22′40″W	Hastings	
14	Jackson-Einspahr Sod House	Jackson-Einspahr Sod House	November 8, 2006 (#06000994)	Address Restricted	Holstein	
15	McCormick Hall	McCormick Hall	May 12, 1975 (#75001086)	Hastings College campus 40°35′32″N 98°22′25″W	Hastings	
16	McCue-Trausch Farmstead	McCue-Trausch Farmstead	March 9, 2000 (#00000165)	Northeastern quarter of Section 12, Township 6 North, Range 11 West; 40°30′32″N 98°29′49″W	Hastings	
17	Nebraska Loan and Trust Company Building	Nebraska Loan and Trust Company Building	May 1, 1979 (#79001431)	2nd St. and Lincoln Ave. 40°35′08″N 98°23′28″W	Hastings	
18	Nowlan-Dietrich House	Nowlan-Dietrich House	April 17, 1979 (#79001432)	1105 N. Kansas Ave. 40°35′45″N 98°23′09″W	Hastings	
19	St. Mark's Episcopal Pro-Cathedral	St. Mark's Episcopal Pro-Cathedral	November 30, 1987 (#87002086)	Junction of 4th and Burlington; 40°35′16″N 98°23′29″W	Hastings	
20	Stein Brothers Building	Stein Brothers Building	May 1, 1979 (#79001433)	630 W. 2nd St. 40°35′07″N 98°23′20″W	Hastings	
21	Thirty-Two Mile Station Site	Thirty-Two Mile Station Site	February 20, 1975 (#75001088)	Osage Ave between Assumption and Oak Ridge Rds; 40°31′20″N 98°28′49″W	Hastings	Site of stage and Pony Express station, burned by Indians in 1864
22	Victory Building	Victory Building	March 31, 1987 (#86003379)	2nd at Saint Joseph Ave. 40°35′06″N 98°23′13″W	Hastings	

== Former listings ==
	Name on the Register	Image	Date listed	Date removed	Location	City or town	Description
1	Antioch School	Antioch School	September 28, 1988 (#88000914)	March 22, 2016	Near Crooked Creek; 40°22′43″N 98°17′48″W	Pauline	
2	Ringland Hall		May 12, 1975 (#75001087)	July 7, 2004	Hastings College campus	Hastings	Demolished in 1987.

== See also ==
- List of National Historic Landmarks in Nebraska
- National Register of Historic Places listings in Nebraska
