= Cottonwood Township =

Cottonwood Township may refer to:

- Cottonwood Township, Cumberland County, Illinois
- Cottonwood Township, Chase County, Kansas
- Cottonwood Township, Brown County, Minnesota
- Cottonwood Township, Adams County, Nebraska
- Cottonwood Township, Nance County, Nebraska
- Cottonwood Township, Phelps County, Nebraska
- Cottonwood Township, Mountrail County, North Dakota, in Mountrail County, North Dakota
