= West Blue (disambiguation) =

West Blue may refer to one of the following:

- West Blue Mountain (New Mexico)
- West Blue Township, Adams County, Nebraska
- West Blue Township, Fillmore County, Nebraska
- a fictional sea in the manga and anime series One Piece
