= Ingleside =

Ingleside may refer to:

== Australia ==
- Ingleside, New South Wales, a suburb of Sydney, Australia
- Ingleside, Queensland, a neighbourhood in City of Gold Coast

== Canada ==
- Ingleside, Ontario, a town in Ontario, Canada

== United States ==
- Ingleside, San Francisco, California
- Ingleside (Safety Harbor, Florida), listed on the National Register of Historic Places (NRHP)
- Ingleside, Illinois
- Ingleside, Kentucky
- Ingleside, Louisiana
- Ingleside, Maryland
- Ingleside (Catonsville, Maryland), a former historic house
- Ingleside, Massachusetts
- Ingleside, Michigan
- Ingleside, Nebraska
- Ingleside, New York
- Ingleside (Alexandria Bay, New York), NRHP-listed
- Ingleside, North Carolina
- Ingleside (Iron Station, North Carolina), NRHP-listed
- Ingleside (Spartanburg County, South Carolina), a formerly NRHP-listed house in Spartanburg County, South Carolina
- Ingleside, Texas
- Ingleside, Norfolk, Virginia
- Ingleside (Washington, D.C.), NRHP-listed
- Ingleside (Radford, Virginia), a 1789 historic home at Ingles Ferry
- Ingleside (Amelia Courthouse, Virginia), NRHP-listed
- Ingleside (Oak Grove, Virginia), NRHP-listed
- Ingleside (Ridgeway, Virginia), NRHP-listed
- Ingleside, West Virginia
- Ingleside (Moorefield, West Virginia), NRHP-listed

== Transportation ==
- Ingleside station, a commuter rail station in Ingleside, Illinois
- K Ingleside, a light rail line in San Francisco, California

== See also ==
- Ingleside on the Bay, Texas
- Naval Station Ingleside, Ingleside, Texas
- Anne of Ingleside
