= Patrick Leonard (disambiguation) =

Patrick Leonard (born 1956) is an American musician.

Patrick Leonard may also refer to:

- Patrick Leonard (baseball) (born 1992), American baseball player
- Patrick Leonard (footballer) (1877–?), Scottish professional footballer
- Patrick Leonard (politician), Irish politician, businessman and landowner
- Patrick James Leonard (1847–1899), Medal of Honor recipient
- Patrick Thomas Leonard (1828–1905), Medal of Honor recipient
