= Juniata =

Juniata may refer to:

== Places in the United States ==
=== In Michigan ===
- Juniata Station, Michigan or Juniata, a railway station in Fremont Township, Tuscola County
- Juniata Township, Michigan, a civil township of Tuscola County

=== In Nebraska ===
- Juniata Township, Adams County, Nebraska
  - Juniata, Nebraska, a village in Juniata Township

=== In Pennsylvania ===
- Juniata, Philadelphia, a neighborhood in Philadelphia
- Juniata College, a private, liberal arts college in Huntingdon
- Juniata County, Pennsylvania
- Juniata River, a tributary of the Susquehanna River and source for most of the other names
- Juniata Terrace, Pennsylvania, a borough in Mifflin County
- Juniata Township, Bedford County, Pennsylvania
- Juniata Township, Blair County, Pennsylvania
- Juniata Township, Huntingdon County, Pennsylvania
- Juniata Township, Perry County, Pennsylvania

== Ships ==
- USS Juniata, the name of various United States Navy ships
- SS Juniata, former name of the Milwaukee Clipper, a Great Lakes steamer

== Other ==
- Onojutta-Haga, or Juniata (Iottecas), a former Native American tribe of Pennsylvania
- Juniata (train), a New York-Pittsburgh passenger train operated by Pennsylvania Railroad and Penn Central
- Juniata Formation, a bedrock formation in Pennsylvania
- Juniata Terminal Company, locomotive leasing and railcar-storage company
- Juniata Valley Railroad, a short line railroad in Pennsylvania
- Juniata and Southern Railway, a former rail line in Pennsylvania
