= West Blue Township, Nebraska =

West Blue Township, Nebraska may refer to the following places:

- West Blue Township, Adams County, Nebraska
- West Blue Township, Fillmore County, Nebraska
