= Juniata Township =

Juniata Township may refer to the following places in the United States:

- Juniata Township, Michigan
- Juniata Township, Adams County, Nebraska
- Juniata Township, Bedford County, Pennsylvania
- Juniata Township, Blair County, Pennsylvania
- Juniata Township, Huntingdon County, Pennsylvania
- Juniata Township, Perry County, Pennsylvania
