= Hansen, Nebraska =

Unincorporated community in Adams and Hall counties in Nebraska, United States

- Unincorporated community
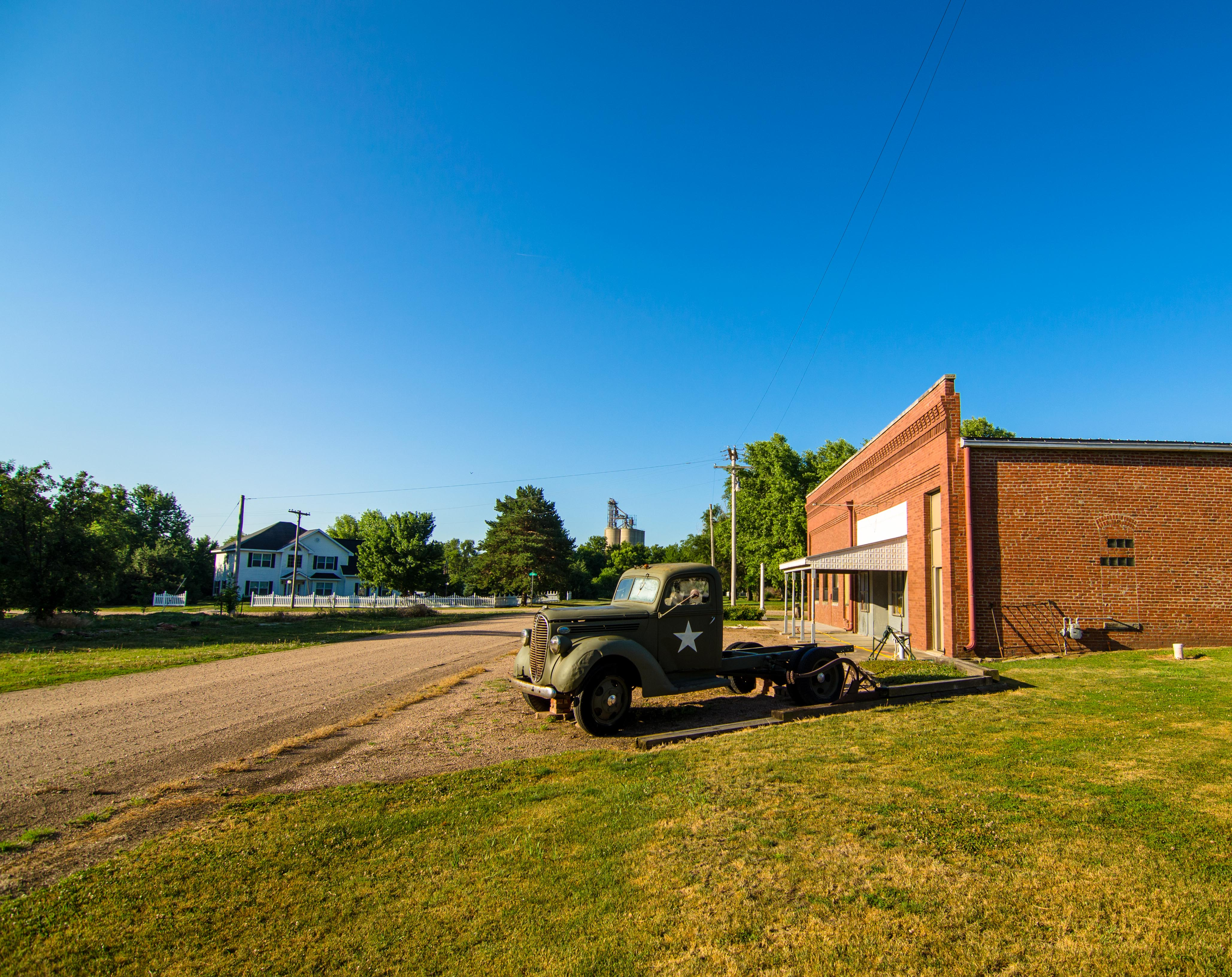
- Hansen, July 2017

- Location within the state of Nebraska
- Coordinates: 40°41′47″N 98°22′13″W
- Country: United States
- State: Nebraska
- County: Adams, Hall
- Townships: West Blue, Doniphan
- Founded: 1879
- Elevation: 1,949 ft (594 m)
- Time zone: UTC-6 (Central (CST))
  - Summer (DST): UTC-5 (CDT)
- ZIP codes: 68901
- Area code: 402
- GNIS feature ID: 829775

Hansen is an unincorporated community in Adams and Hall counties in Nebraska, United States.

== History ==
Hansen got its start in the year 1879 when the railroad was extended to that point. Hansen was named in honor of a railroad official.

A post office was opened in Hansen in 1879, and remained in operation until it was discontinued in 1955.
