= George W. Thompson (Medal of Honor) =

United States Army private

- Born: 1847; Victory, New York, United States
- Died: unknown
- Military career
- Allegiance: United States
- Branch: United States Army
- Service years: 1866 - 1872
- Rank: Private
- Unit: 2nd U.S. Cavalry
- Conflicts: Indian Wars
- Awards: Medal of Honor

George Washington Thompson (1847 – unknown) was a Private in the U.S. Army who served with the 2nd U.S. Cavalry during the Indian Wars. He was one of five men received the Medal of Honor for gallantry fighting the Plains Indians at the Little Blue River in Little Blue, Nebraska on May 15, 1870.

== Biography ==
George Washington Thompson was born in Victory, New York in 1847. He enlisted in the Army from Syracuse, New York in March 1866, and was assigned to Company C of the 2nd U.S. Cavalry. Thompson was sent out west where he served on the frontier for most of his military career and took part in campaigns against the Plains Indians during the early 1870s.

On May 15, 1870, while searching for stray horses near the Little Blue River (near present-day Little Blue, Nebraska), Thompson and five other cavalrymen were ambushed by a hostile band of 50 Indians. He and his comrades distinguished themselves in battle, killing three and wounding seven of their attackers, before finally managing to drive them off after two hours of fighting. For his actions, Thompson was cited for "gallantry in action" and received the Medal of Honor, along with Privates Thomas Hubbard, Heth Canfield, Michael Himmelsback and Sergeant Patrick James Leonard, a month later.

On May 16, 1872, nearly two years after the battle at Little Blue, Thompson tried to desert the regiment but was caught the next day. He made his second attempt two months later on July 2, successfully escaping, and thereafter disappeared from public record.

== Medal of Honor citation ==
Rank and organization: Private, Company C, 2d U.S. Cavalry. Place and date: At Little Blue, Nebr., 15 May 1870. Entered service at: ------. Birth: Victory, N.Y. Date of issue: 22 June 1870.

Citation:

Gallantry in action.

== See also ==
- List of Medal of Honor recipients for the Indian Wars
