= Assumption, Nebraska =

Unincorporated community in Nebraska, United States

- Unincorporated community
- Location within Nebraska Location within the United States
- Coordinates: 40°30′36″N 98°34′20″W
- Country: United States
- State: Nebraska
- County: Adams
- Township: Roseland
- Settled: c. 1873
- Named for: Church of the Assumption of the Blessed Virgin Mary
- Elevation: 1,975 ft (602 m)
- Time zone: UTC-6 (Central (CST))
  - Summer (DST): UTC-5 (CDT)
- ZIP code: 68973
- Area code: 402
- GNIS feature ID: 827098

Assumption is an unincorporated community in Roseland Township, Adams County, Nebraska, United States.

== History ==
A colony of German Catholics settled near Assumption circa 1873. The name Assumption is derived from the Church of the Assumption of the Blessed Virgin Mary, established in the 1880s.
