= Roseland Township =

Roseland Township may refer to the following townships in the United States:

- Roseland Township, Kandiyohi County, Minnesota
- Roseland Township, Adams County, Nebraska
