= Nebraska Loan and Trust Company Building =

- U.S. National Register of Historic Places
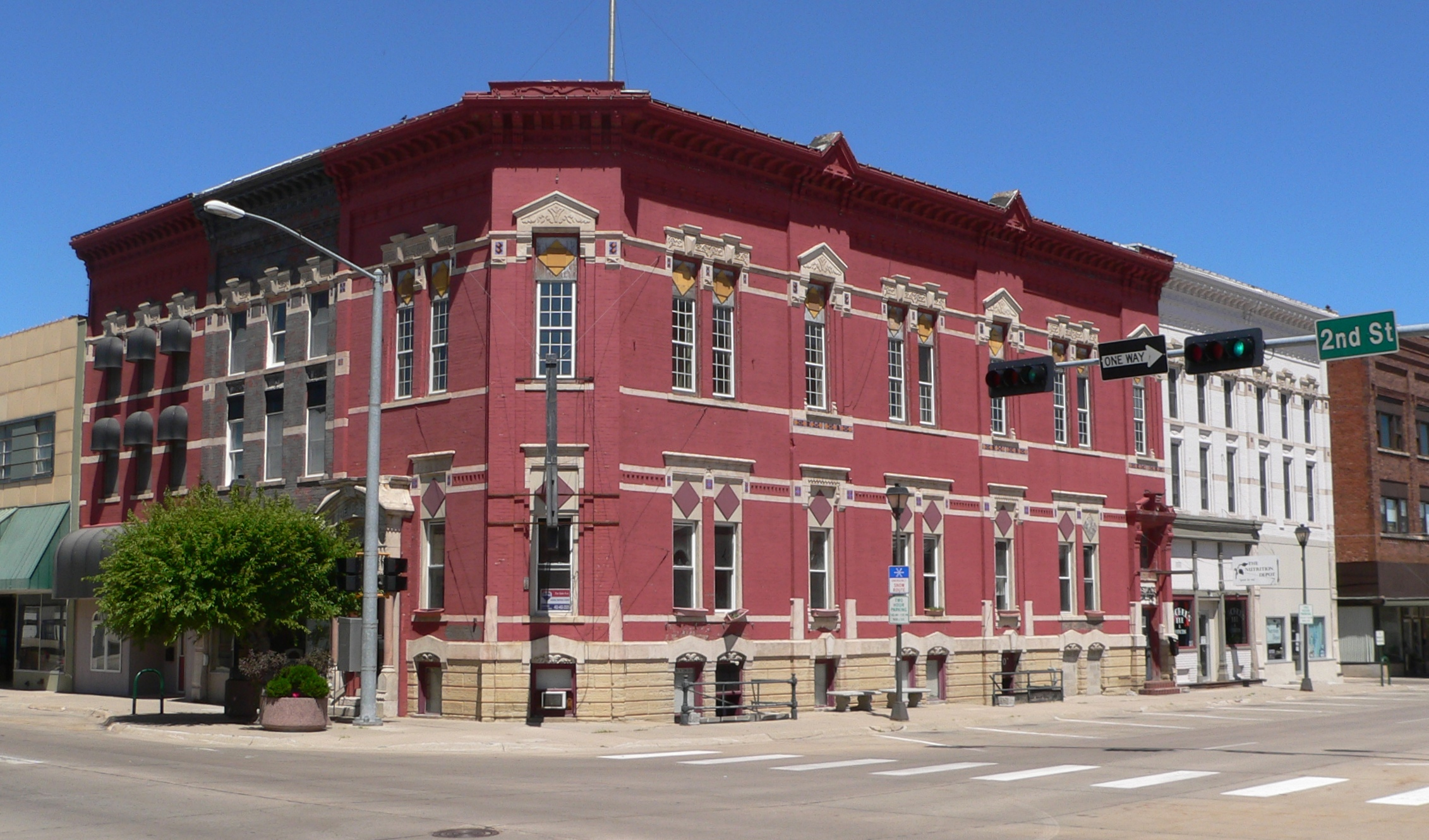
- The building in 2010

- Location within Nebraska Location within the United States
- Location: 2nd Street and Lincoln Avenue, Hastings, Nebraska
- Coordinates: 40°35′08″N 98°23′28″W
- Area: less than one acre
- Built: 1883
- Architectural style: Italianate, High Victorian Italianate
- NRHP reference No.: 79001431
- Added to NRHP: May 1, 1979

The Nebraska Loan and Trust Company Building, also known as the Clarke-Buchanan Building, is a historic building in Hastings, Nebraska. It was built in 1883, and designed in the Italianate architectural style, although the style "conforms to no major American architectural movement." It was the headquarters of the Nebraska Loan and Trust Company from 1884 to 1903, and the Clarke-Buchanan Company from 1903 to 1931. It has been listed on the National Register of Historic Places since May 1, 1979.
