= Zero Township, Adams County, Nebraska =

Township in Nebraska, United States

Coordinates: 40°23′30″N 98°26′16″W

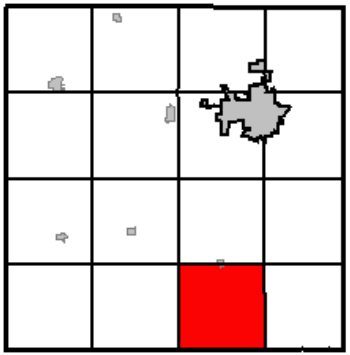
Map of Adams County highlighting Zero Township.

Zero Township is one of sixteen townships in Adams County, Nebraska, United States. The population was 207 at the 2020 census.

A portion of the village of Ayr lies within the township.

== See also ==
- County government in Nebraska
