= Roseland, Nebraska =

Village in Nebraska, US

- Village
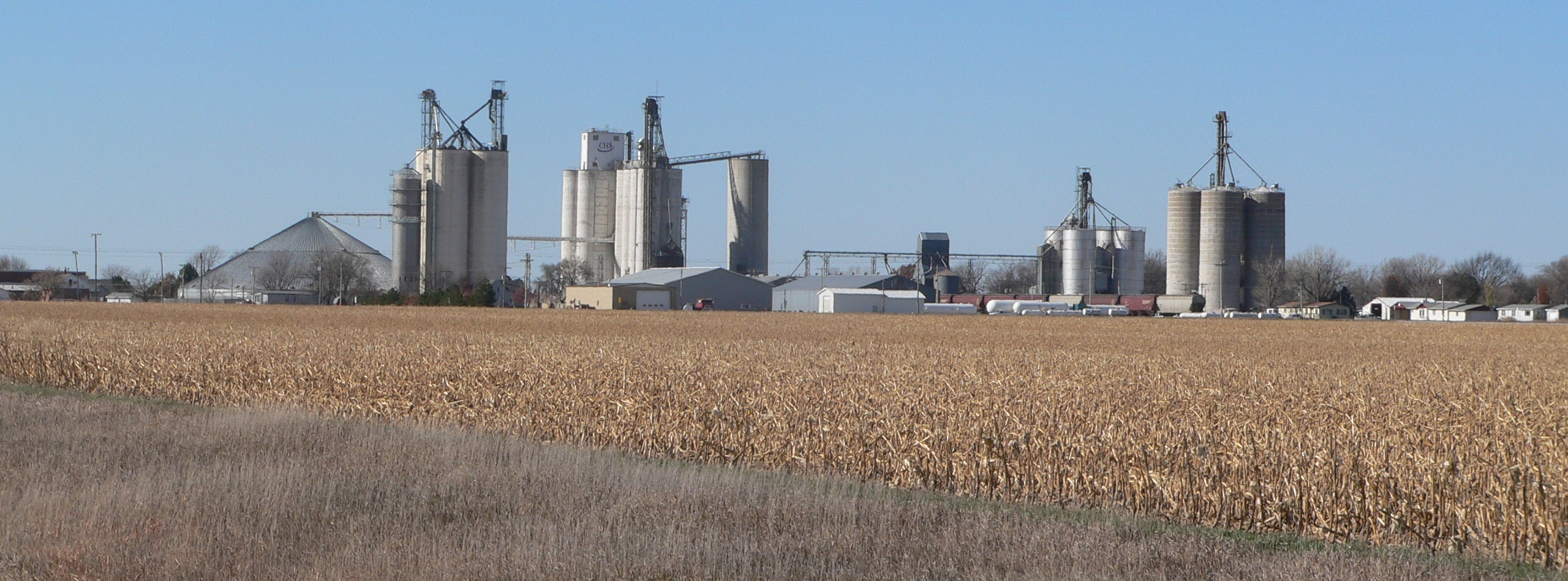
- Roseland, seen from the southeast, November 2012

- Location of Roseland, Nebraska
- Coordinates: 40°28′11″N 98°33′31″W
- Country: United States
- State: Nebraska
- County: Adams
- Township: Roseland
- Founded: 1887
- Incorporated: 1889

Area
  - Total: 0.27 sq mi (0.71 km^{2})
  - Land: 0.27 sq mi (0.71 km^{2})
  - Water: 0 sq mi (0.00 km^{2})
- Elevation: 1,969 ft (600 m)

Population (2020)
  - Total: 260
  - Estimate (2021): 259
  - Density: 950/sq mi (370/km^{2})
- Time zone: UTC-6 (Central (CST))
  - Summer (DST): UTC-5 (CDT)
- ZIP code: 68973
- Area code: 402
- FIPS code: 31-42355
- GNIS feature ID: 2399121
- Website: www.roselandne.com

Roseland is a village in Roseland Township, Adams County, Nebraska, United States. The population was 260 at the 2020 census. It is part of the Hastings, Nebraska Micropolitan Statistical Area.

== History ==
Roseland got its start in the year 1887, following construction of the railroad through the territory. It was named from the wild roses in the area. Roseland was incorporated as a village in 1889.

== Geography ==
According to the United States Census Bureau, the village has a total area of 0.27 square miles (0.70 km^{2}), all land.

== Demographics ==
Historical population
Census	Pop.	Note	%±
1900	227		—
1910	249		9.7%
1920	243		−2.4%
1930	180		−25.9%
1940	187		3.9%
1950	154		−17.6%
1960	163		5.8%
1970	212		30.1%
1980	254		19.8%
1990	247		−2.8%
2000	242		−2.0%
2010	235		−2.9%
2020	263		11.9%
2021 (est.)	259	▼	−1.5%
U.S. Decennial Census

=== 2010 census ===
As of the census of 2010, there were 235 people, 91 households, and 68 families residing in the village. The population density was 870.4 inhabitants per square mile (336.1/km^{2}). There were 98 housing units at an average density of 363.0 per square mile (140.2/km^{2}). The racial makeup of the village was 100.0% White.

There were 91 households, of which 31.9% had children under the age of 18 living with them, 64.8% were married couples living together, 5.5% had a female householder with no husband present, 4.4% had a male householder with no wife present, and 25.3% were non-families. 23.1% of all households were made up of individuals, and 7.7% had someone living alone who was 65 years of age or older. The average household size was 2.58 and the average family size was 2.97.

The median age in the village was 36.8 years. 28.5% of residents were under the age of 18; 5.2% were between the ages of 18 and 24; 22.5% were from 25 to 44; 28.6% were from 45 to 64; and 15.3% were 65 years of age or older. The gender makeup of the village was 49.4% male and 50.6% female.

=== 2000 census ===
As of the census of 2000, there were 242 people, 102 households, and 69 families residing in the village. The population density was 957.0 inhabitants per square mile (369.5/km^{2}). There were 106 housing units at an average density of 419.2 per square mile (161.9/km^{2}). The racial makeup of the village was 95.04% White, 1.24% Native American, 1.24% Asian, 2.07% from other races, and 0.41% from two or more races. Hispanic or Latino of any race were 3.72% of the population.

There were 102 households, out of which 30.4% had children under the age of 18 living with them, 63.7% were married couples living together, 2.0% had a female householder with no husband present, and 31.4% were non-families. 29.4% of all households were made up of individuals, and 14.7% had someone living alone who was 65 years of age or older. The average household size was 2.37 and the average family size was 2.93.

In the village, the population was spread out, with 24.0% under the age of 18, 9.1% from 18 to 24, 28.5% from 25 to 44, 21.5% from 45 to 64, and 16.9% who were 65 years of age or older. The median age was 37 years. For every 100 females, there were 96.7 males. For every 100 females age 18 and over, there were 95.7 males.

As of 2000 the median income for a household in the village was $35,714, and the median income for a family was $41,875. Males had a median income of $30,962 versus $19,063 for females. The per capita income for the village was $15,626. About 3.9% of families and 4.1% of the population were below the poverty line, including 4.3% of those under the age of eighteen and 5.7% of those 65 or over.

== See also ==
- List of municipalities in Nebraska
