= Ayr Township, Adams County, Nebraska =

Township in Nebraska, United States

Coordinates: 40°28′49″N 98°26′43″W

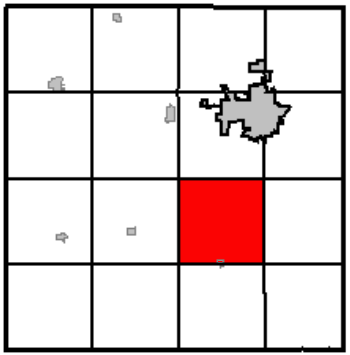
Map of Adams County highlighting Ayr Township.

Ayr Township is one of sixteen townships in Adams County, Nebraska, United States. The population was 452 at the 2020 census.

A portion of the village of Ayr lies within the township.

== See also ==
- County government in Nebraska
