= Prosser, Nebraska =

Village in Adams County, Nebraska, United States

- Village
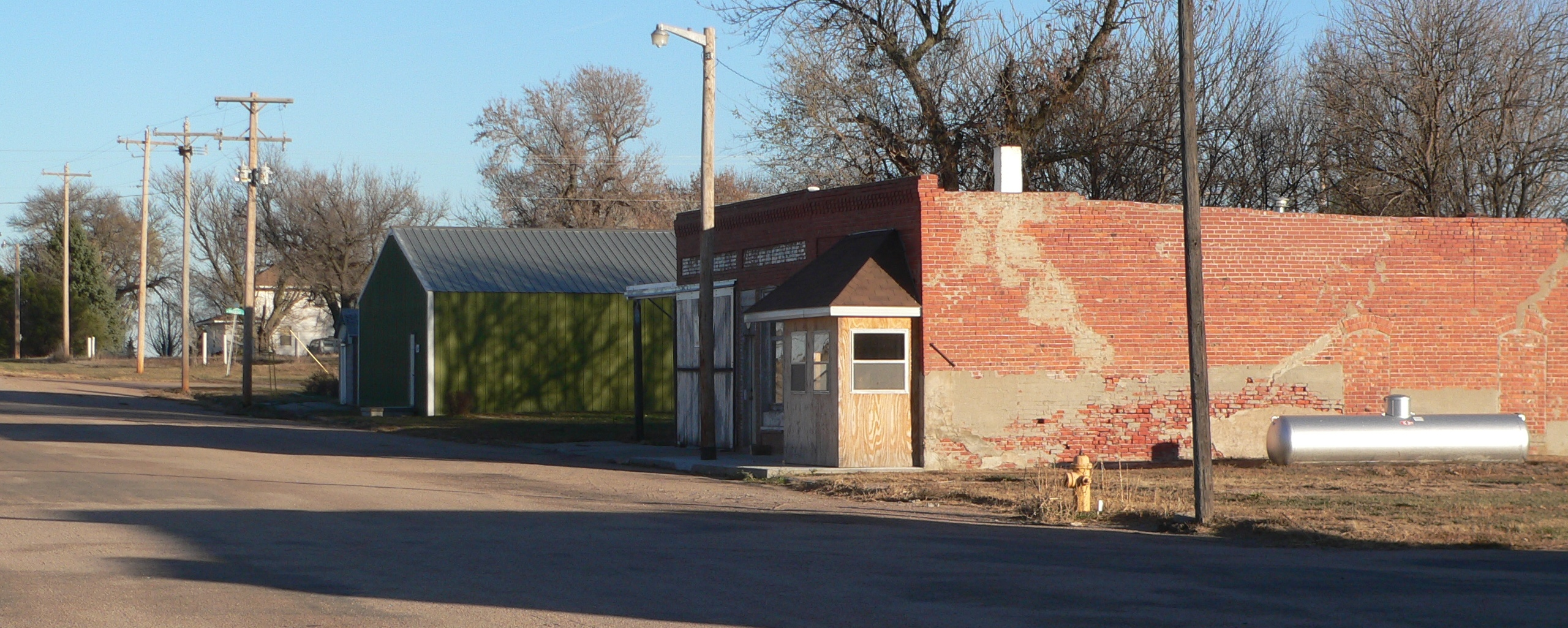
- Virginia Avenue in Prosser, November 2012

- Location of Prosser, Nebraska

- Location within Nebraska Location within the United States
- Coordinates: 40°41′15″N 98°34′41″W
- Country: United States
- State: Nebraska
- County: Adams
- Township: Verona
- Founded: 1888
- Incorporated: 1907
- Named for: T. J. Prosser

Area
  - Total: 0.24 sq mi (0.63 km^{2})
  - Land: 0.24 sq mi (0.63 km^{2})
  - Water: 0 sq mi (0.00 km^{2})
- Elevation: 2,041 ft (622 m)

Population (2020)
  - Total: 73
  - Estimate (2021): 73
  - Density: 300/sq mi (120/km^{2})
- Time zone: UTC-6 (Central (CST))
  - Summer (DST): UTC-5 (CDT)
- ZIP code: 68883
- Area code: 402
- FIPS code: 31-40430
- GNIS feature ID: 2399028

Prosser is a village in Verona Township, Adams County, Nebraska, United States. The population was 73 at the 2020 census. It is part of the Hastings, Nebraska, Micropolitan Statistical Area.

== History ==
Prosser got its start following construction of the railroad through the territory in the spring of 1888. It was named for T. J. Prosser, a railroad official. Prosser was incorporated as a village in 1907.

== Geography ==
According to the United States Census Bureau, the village has a total area of 0.25 square miles (0.65 km^{2}), all land.

== Demographics ==
Historical population
Census	Pop.	Note	%±
1910	163		—
1920	156		−4.3%
1930	144		−7.7%
1940	99		−31.2%
1950	81		−18.2%
1960	70		−13.6%
1970	70		0.0%
1980	98		40.0%
1990	77		−21.4%
2000	94		22.1%
2010	66		−29.8%
2020	76		15.2%
2021 (est.)	73	▼	−3.9%
U.S. Decennial Census

=== 2010 census ===
As of the census of 2010, there were 66 people, 34 households, and 22 families living in the village. The population density was 264.0 inhabitants per square mile (101.9/km^{2}). There were 40 housing units at an average density of 160.0 per square mile (61.8/km^{2}). The racial makeup of the village was 100.0% White.

There were 34 households, of which 11.8% had children under the age of 18 living with them, 61.8% were married couples living together, 2.9% had a female householder with no husband present, and 35.3% were non-families. 32.4% of all households were made up of individuals, and 2.9% had someone living alone who was 65 years of age or older. The average household size was 1.94 and the average family size was 2.41.

The median age in the village was 54.4 years. 12.1% of residents were under the age of 18; 2.9% were between the ages of 18 and 24; 13.6% were from 25 to 44; 60.5% were from 45 to 64; and 10.6% were 65 years of age or older. The gender makeup of the village was 43.9% male and 56.1% female.

=== 2000 census ===
As of the census of 2000, there were 94 people, 37 households, and 26 families living in the village. The population density was 379.0 inhabitants per square mile (146.3/km^{2}). There were 45 housing units at an average density of 181.4 per square mile (70.0/km^{2}). The racial makeup of the village was 98.94% White, 1.06% from other races. Hispanic or Latino of any race were 2.13% of the population.

There were 37 households, out of which 27.0% had children under the age of 18 living with them, 59.5% were married couples living together, 8.1% had a female householder with no husband present, and 29.7% were non-families. 24.3% of all households were made up of individuals, and 8.1% had someone living alone who was 65 years of age or older. The average household size was 2.54 and the average family size was 3.08.

In the village, the population was spread out, with 20.2% under the age of 18, 11.7% from 18 to 24, 26.6% from 25 to 44, 31.9% from 45 to 64, and 9.6% who were 65 years of age or older. The median age was 42 years. For every 100 females, there were 113.6 males. For every 100 females age 18 and over, there were 114.3 males.

As of 2000 the median income for a household in the village was $29,583, and the median income for a family was $38,750. Males had a median income of $21,875 versus $21,250 for females. The per capita income for the village was $17,011. There were 8.3% of families and 21.4% of the population living below the poverty line, including 38.1% of under eighteens and 50.0% of those over 64.

== See also ==
- List of municipalities in Nebraska
