= Verona Township, Adams County, Nebraska =

Township in Nebraska, United States

Coordinates: 40°39′18″N 98°33′17″W

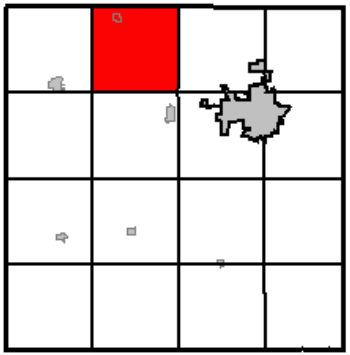
Map of Adams County highlighting Verona Township.

Verona Township is one of sixteen townships in Adams County, Nebraska, United States. The population was 253 at the 2020 census.

The village of Prosser lies within the township.

== See also ==
- County government in Nebraska
