= Ayr, Nebraska =

Village in Nebraska, US

- Village
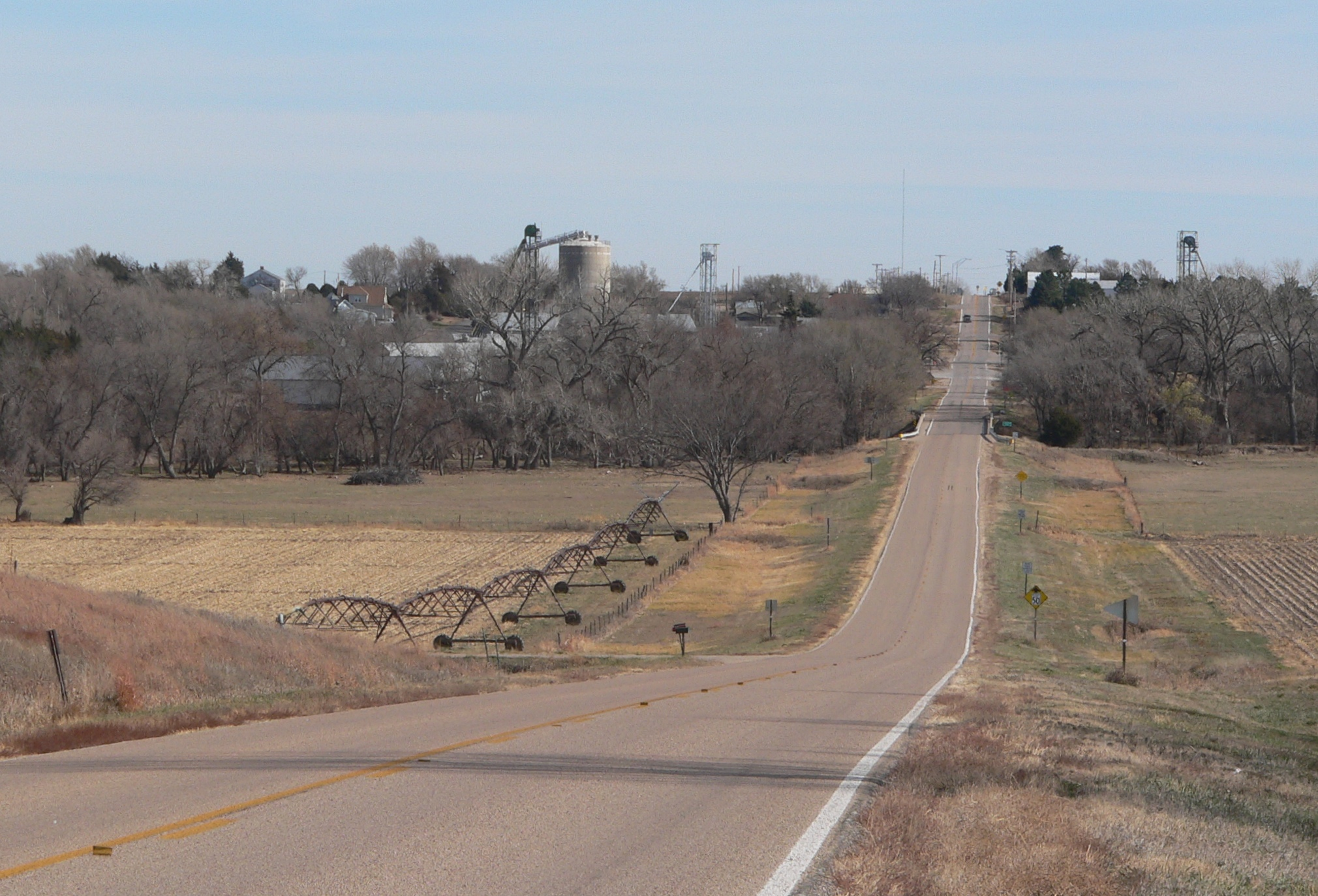
- Ayr, as seen from the west along Nebraska Highway 74, November 2012

- Location of Ayr, Nebraska
- Coordinates: 40°26′16″N 98°26′27″W
- Country: United States
- State: Nebraska
- County: Adams
- Townships: Ayr, Zero
- Founded: 1878
- Incorporated: 1883
- Named after: Doctor Ayr

Area
  - Total: 0.24 sq mi (0.63 km^{2})
  - Land: 0.24 sq mi (0.63 km^{2})
  - Water: 0 sq mi (0.00 km^{2})
- Elevation: 1,831 ft (558 m)

Population (2020)
  - Total: 83
  - Density: 342.6/sq mi (132.27/km^{2})
- Time zone: UTC-6 (Central (CST))
  - Summer (DST): UTC-5 (CDT)
- ZIP code: 68925
- Area code: 402
- FIPS code: 31-02865
- GNIS feature ID: 2398015

Ayr is a village in Ayr and Zero townships Adams County, Nebraska, United States. The population was 83 at the 2020 census. It is part of the Hastings, Nebraska Micropolitan Statistical Area.

== History ==
Ayr got its start in the year 1878, following construction of the railroad through the territory. It was named for Doctor Ayr, a railroad official from Iowa. Ayr was incorporated as a village in 1883.

== Geography ==
According to the United States Census Bureau, the village has a total area of 0.18 square miles (0.47 km^{2}), all land.

=== Climate ===
Climate data for Ayr, Nebraska (coordinates:40.4798°N 98.4026°W, 1991-2020)
| Month | Jan | Feb | Mar | Apr | May | Jun | Jul | Aug | Sep | Oct | Nov | Dec | Year |
|---|---|---|---|---|---|---|---|---|---|---|---|---|---|
| Average precipitation inches (mm) | 0.55 (14) | 0.82 (21) | 1.43 (36) | 2.68 (68) | 5.46 (139) | 4.20 (107) | 3.30 (84) | 3.45 (88) | 2.14 (54) | 2.02 (51) | 1.13 (29) | 0.91 (23) | 28.09 (714) |
| Average precipitation days (≥ 0.01 in) | 3.4 | 4.2 | 6.4 | 8.4 | 10.3 | 9.5 | 7.5 | 8.5 | 6.9 | 6.7 | 3.4 | 5 | 80.2 |
Source: NOAA

== Demographics ==
Historical population
| Census | Pop. | Note | %± |
|---|---|---|---|
| 1880 | 128 | | — |
| 1890 | 173 | | 35.2% |
| 1900 | 141 | | −18.5% |
| 1910 | 142 | | 0.7% |
| 1920 | 164 | | 15.5% |
| 1930 | 177 | | 7.9% |
| 1940 | 152 | | −14.1% |
| 1950 | 121 | | −20.4% |
| 1960 | 111 | | −8.3% |
| 1970 | 140 | | 26.1% |
| 1980 | 112 | | −20.0% |
| 1990 | 101 | | −9.8% |
| 2000 | 98 | | −3.0% |
| 2010 | 94 | | −4.1% |
| 2020 | 83 | | −11.7% |
U.S. Decennial Census

=== 2010 census ===
As of the census of 2010, there were 94 people, 35 households, and 26 families in the village. The population density was 522.2 inhabitants per square mile (201.6/km^{2}). There were 36 housing units at an average density of 200.0 per square mile (77.2/km^{2}). The racial makeup of the village was 100.0% White.

Of the 35 households 34.3% had children under the age of 18 living with them, 65.7% were married couples living together, 2.9% had a female householder with no husband present, 5.7% had a male householder with no wife present, and 25.7% were non-families. 22.9% of households were one person and 8.6% were one person aged 65 or older. The average household size was 2.69 and the average family size was 3.15.

The median age in the village was 43.5 years. 28.7% of residents were under the age of 18; 2.1% were between the ages of 18 and 24; 21.2% were from 25 to 44; 34.1% were from 45 to 64; and 13.8% were 65 or older. The gender makeup of the village was 50.0% male and 50.0% female.

=== 2000 census ===
At the 2000 census there were 98 people, 40 households, and 32 families in the village. The population density was 568.6 inhabitants per square mile (219.5/km^{2}). There were 42 housing units at an average density of 243.7 per square mile (94.1/km^{2}). The racial makeup of the village was 96.94% White, 1.02% Asian, and 2.04% from two or more races.

Of the 40 households 35.0% had children under the age of 18 living with them, 70.0% were married couples living together, 2.5% had a female householder with no husband present, and 20.0% were non-families. 17.5% of households were one person and 2.5% were one person aged 65 or older. The average household size was 2.45 and the average family size was 2.72.

The age distribution was 26.5% under the age of 18, 5.1% from 18 to 24, 27.6% from 25 to 44, 29.6% from 45 to 64, and 11.2% 65 or older. The median age was 36 years. For every 100 females, there were 104.2 males. For every 100 females age 18 and over, there were 100.0 males.

The median household income was $48,125, and the median family income was $51,250. Males had a median income of $31,250 versus $16,250 for females. The per capita income for the village was $16,179. There were no families and 4.5% of the population living below the poverty line, including no under eighteens and none of those over 64.

== See also ==
- List of municipalities in Nebraska
- Adams County, Nebraska
