= McCormick Hall =

- U.S. National Register of Historic Places
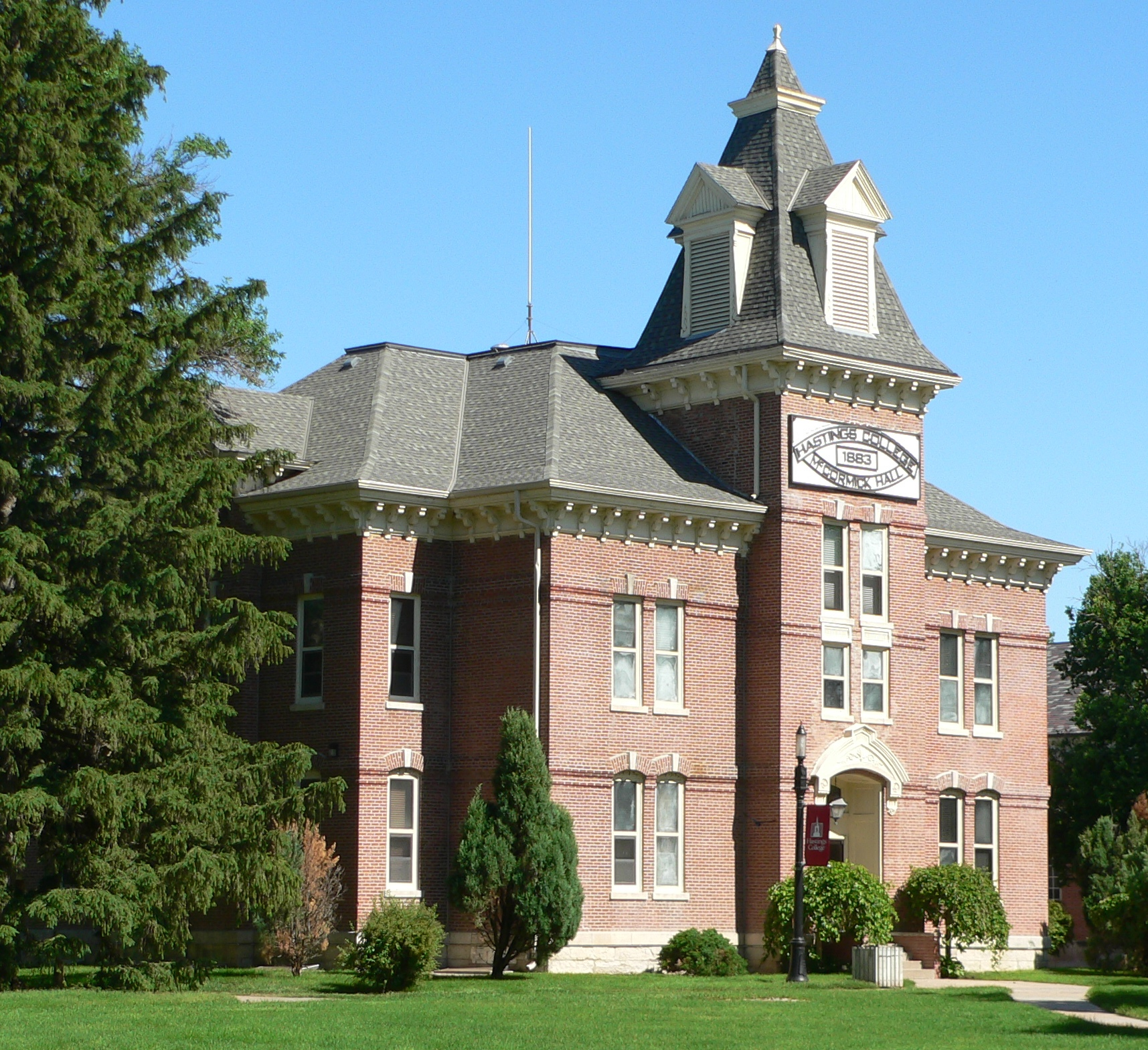
- The building in 2010

- Location within Nebraska Location within the United States
- Location: Hastings College campus, Hastings, Nebraska
- Coordinates: 40°35′32″N 98°22′25″W
- Area: less than one acre
- Built: 1883
- Architectural style: Italianate
- NRHP reference No.: 75001086
- Added to NRHP: May 12, 1975

McCormick Hall is a historic building on the campus of Hastings College in Hastings, Nebraska, United States. It was built in 1883–1884, and designed in the Italianate architectural style. It was the first building on campus, and it housed the departments of English, Journalism, Speech, Drama, Mathematics and Chemistry. There was also a Presbyterian chapel on the second floor, later a theatre. It has been listed on the National Register of Historic Places since May 12, 1975.
