= William Brach House =

- U.S. National Register of Historic Places
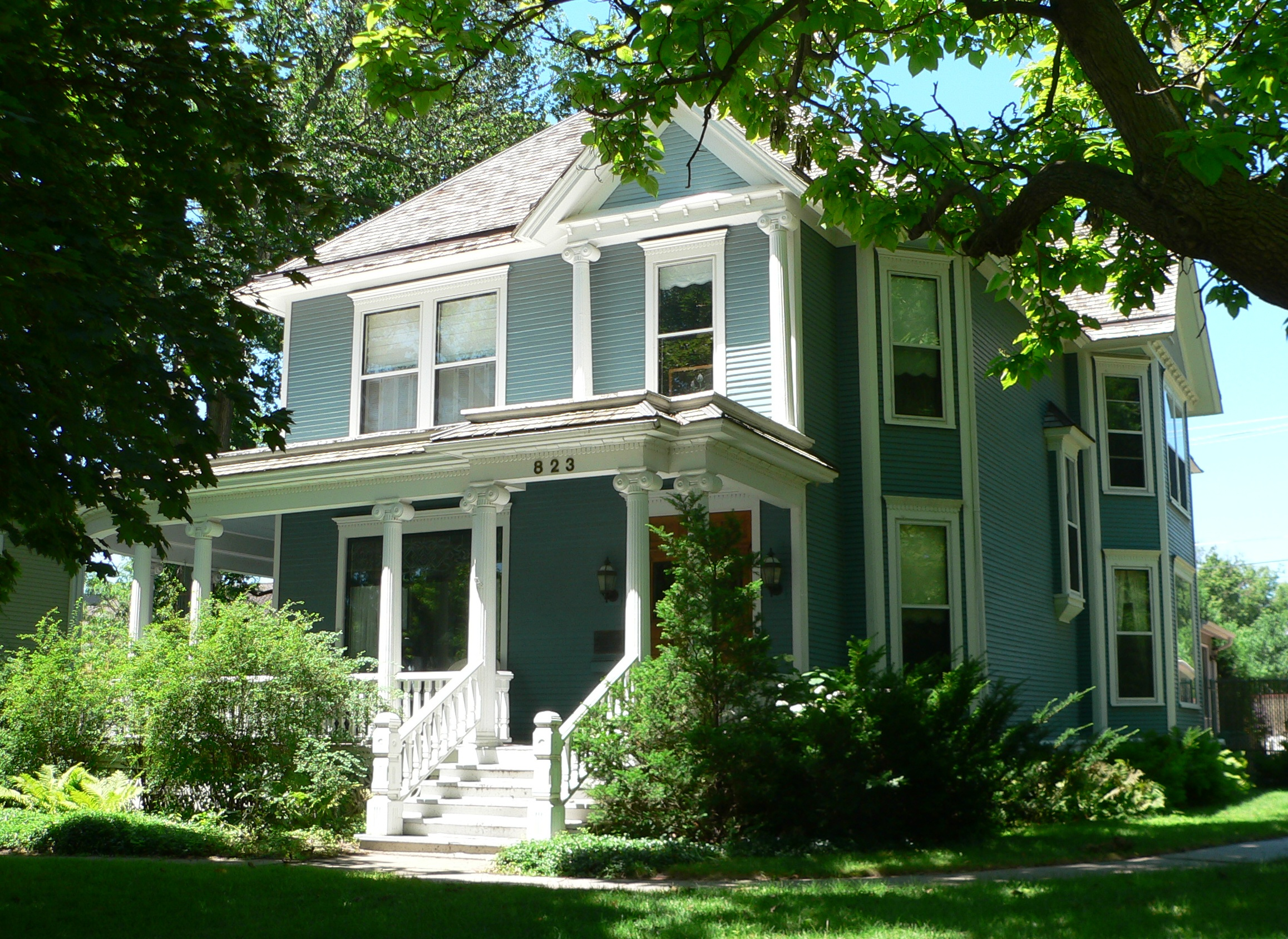
- The house in 2010

- Location within Nebraska Location within the United States
- Location: 823 North Lincoln Avenue, Hastings, Nebraska
- Coordinates: 40°35′33″N 98°23′27″W
- Area: less than one acre
- Built: 1884
- Architectural style: Classical Revival, Queen Anne
- NRHP reference No.: 79001429
- Added to NRHP: February 1, 1979

The William Brach House is a historic house in Hastings, Nebraska. It was built in 1884 for William Brach, his wife Charlotte and their two sons, and designed in the Queen Anne architectural style. Brach was a German immigrant and Freemason who settled in Hastings and worked as the manager of a dry goods store called Wolfbach Brothers founded by some of his relatives; and he became its president when it changed its name to Wolbach & Brach in 1907. Brach was also a civic and political leader in Hastings, where he served on the board of aldermen in 1892. The house was purchased and redesigned in the Classical Revival style by Volney B. Trimble and his wife, Mary Blackman, in 1899. Trimble worked as a grocer, and he served as a councilmember in 1922–1925. The house has been listed on the National Register of Historic Places since February 1, 1979.
