= Hayland, Nebraska =

Unincorporated community in Nebraska, U.S.

Coordinates: 40°39′53″N 98°35′14″W

Hayland is an unincorporated community in Adams County, Nebraska, United States.

== History ==
Hayland got its start in the year 1912, following construction of the railroad through the territory.

The town initially called Meyersville, was renamed after nearby prairies. In 1917 the village's population was 15. The post office was established in 1914 and closed in 1943. The town bank opened on August 1, 1913. Haylands school closed in 1942. The peak population was around 50 people before it became a ghost town. 21523
