= Patrick James Leonard =

United States Army sergeant and Medal of Honor recipient

- Born: May 19, 1847; County Meath, Ireland
- Died: January 24, 1899 (aged 51)
- Military career
- Allegiance: United States of America
- Branch: United States Army
- Rank: Sergeant
- Units: Company C, 2d U.S. Cavalry
- Conflicts: Indian Wars
- Awards: Medal of Honor

Patrick James Leonard (May 19, 1847 – January 24, 1899) was a United States Army sergeant who received the Medal of Honor during the Indian Wars. Until 1984, it was believed that Leonard was a double recipient of the Medal of Honor. However, another Irishman, Patrick Thomas Leonard, had also received the Medal of Honor.

== Early life and education ==
Leonard was born in County Meath, Ireland.

== Military career ==
Leonard enlisted at Cincinnati, Ohio. His actions as a sergeant at the Little Blue River near Little Blue Township, Adams County, Nebraska, on May 15, 1870, led to him being awarded the Medal of Honor on June 22, 1870. While searching for stray horses near the river, Leonard and four other soldiers were ambushed by 50 Indians. The men were able to kill three Indians, and wound seven. After repelling the attack, Leonard then escorted two women and a child to the nearest settlement. The other four soldiers (Pvt. Thomas Hubbard, Pvt. Heth Canfield, Pvt. Michael Himmelsback, Pvt. George W. Thompson) also received Medals of Honor.

== Death and legacy ==
Leonard died on January 24, 1899, and was buried in Saint Joseph Cemetery, New Almelo, Kansas.

== Medal of Honor citation ==
Rank and organization: Sergeant, Company C, 2d U.S. Cavalry. Place and date: At Little Blue, Nebr., May 15, 1870. Entered service at: ------. Birth: Ireland. Date of issue: June 22, 1870.

Citation:

Gallantry in action.

== See also ==
- List of Medal of Honor recipients
- List of Medal of Honor recipients for the Indian Wars
