= Nowlan-Dietrich House =

- U.S. National Register of Historic Places
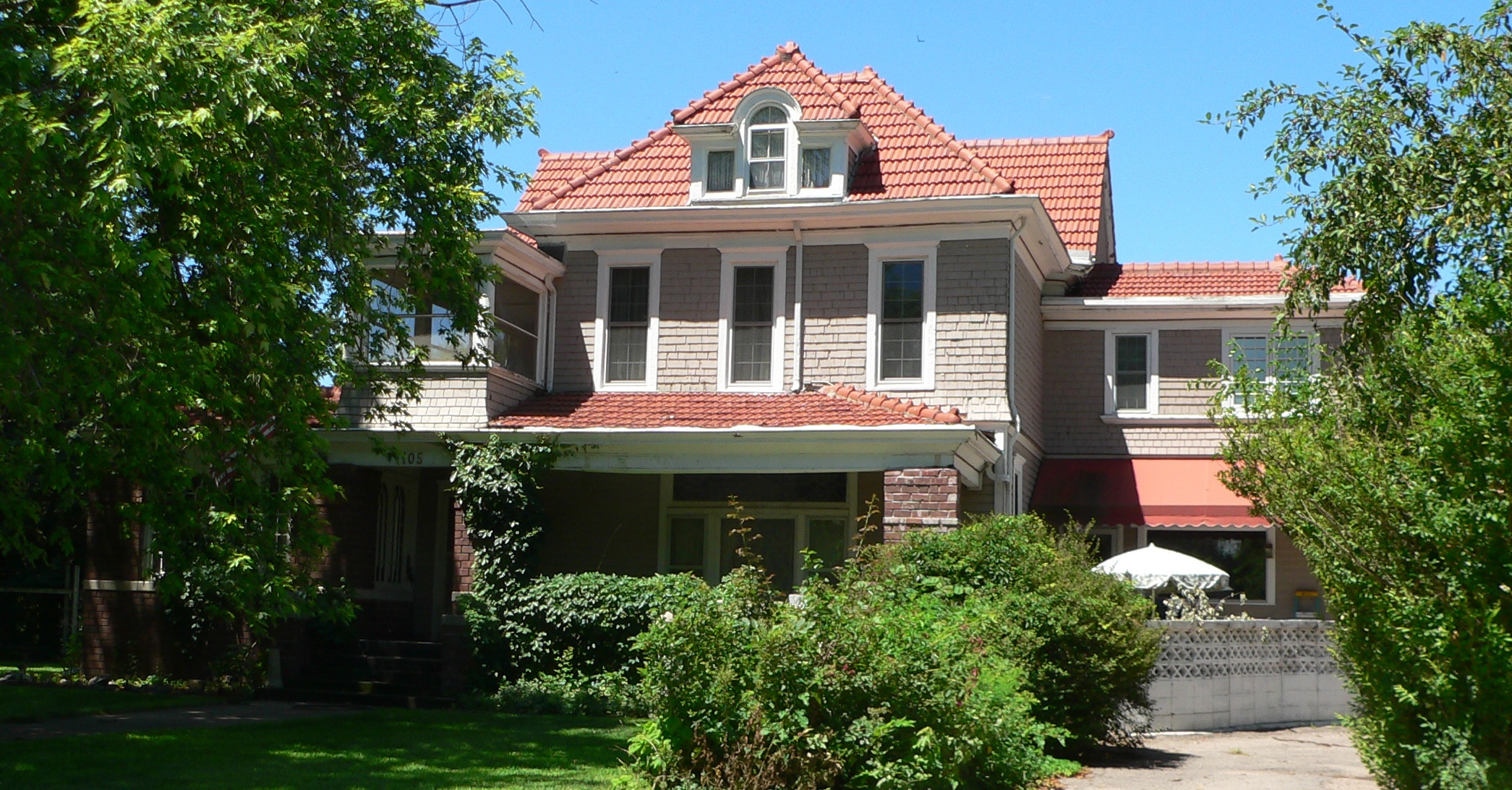
- The house in 2010

- Location within Nebraska Location within the United States
- Location: 1105 North Kansas Avenue, Hastings, Nebraska
- Coordinates: 40°35′45″N 98°23′09″W
- Area: less than one acre
- Built: 1886–1887; 139 years ago
- NRHP reference No.: 79001432
- Added to NRHP: April 17, 1979

The Nowlan-Dietrich House is a historic house in Hastings, Nebraska, USA. It was built in 1886–1887 for A. J. Nowlan, a grocer. In 1909, it was acquired by Charles Henry Dietrich, who had been the 11th Governor of Nebraska in 1901 and a United States Senator from Nebraska from 1901 to 1905. Dietrich and his second wife, Margretta, remodelled the house significantly. It remained Dietrich's primary residence until his death.

The house has been listed on the National Register of Historic Places since April 17, 1979.
