= Stein Brothers Building =

- U.S. National Register of Historic Places
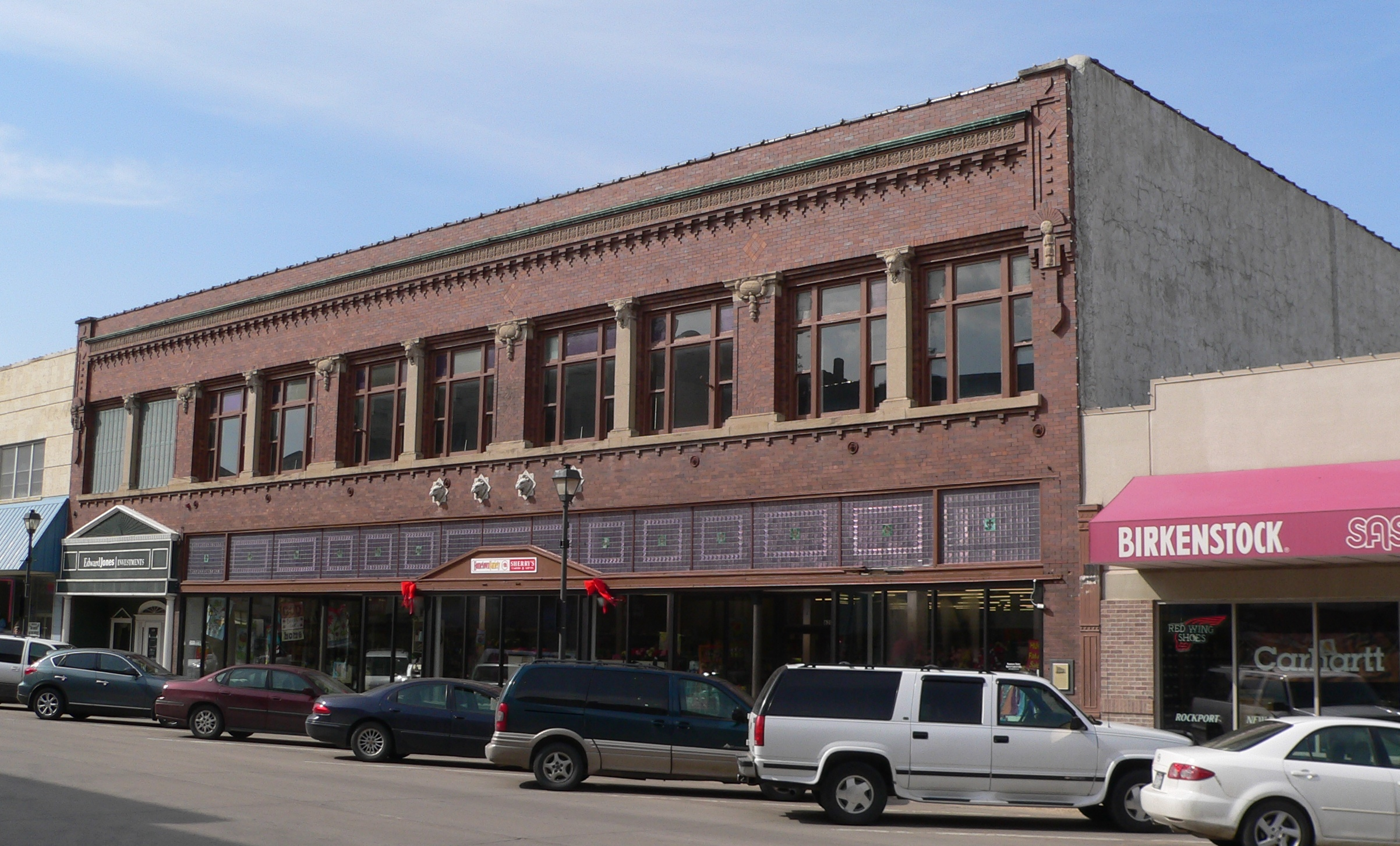
- The building in 2010

- Location within Nebraska Location within the United States
- Location: 630 West 2nd Street, Hastings, Nebraska
- Coordinates: 40°35′07″N 98°23′20″W
- Area: less than one acre
- Built: 1906
- Architectural style: Prairie School
- NRHP reference No.: 79001433
- Added to NRHP: May 1, 1979

The Stein Brothers Building is a historic building in Hastings, Nebraska. It was built in 1906 for Charles Henry Dietrich, who served as the 11th Governor of Nebraska in 1901 and as a United States Senator from Nebraska from 1901 to 1905. Dietrich rented the building to Herman and Edmund Stein, two brothers who managed a dry goods and hardware store. The building was designed in the Prairie School architectural style. It has been listed on the National Register of Historic Places since May 1, 1979.
