= Kenesaw Township, Adams County, Nebraska =

Township in Nebraska, USA

Coordinates: 40°39′51″N 98°40′18″W

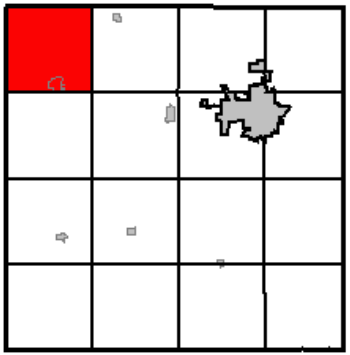
Map of Adams County highlighting Kenesaw Township

Kenesaw Township is one of 16 townships in Adams County, Nebraska, United States. The population was 1,045 at the 2020 census.

The village of Kenesaw lies within the township. The ZIP Code for Kenesaw Township is 68956.

== See also ==
- County government in Nebraska
