= Pauline, Nebraska =

Unincorporated community in Adams County, Nebraska, United States

- Unincorporated community
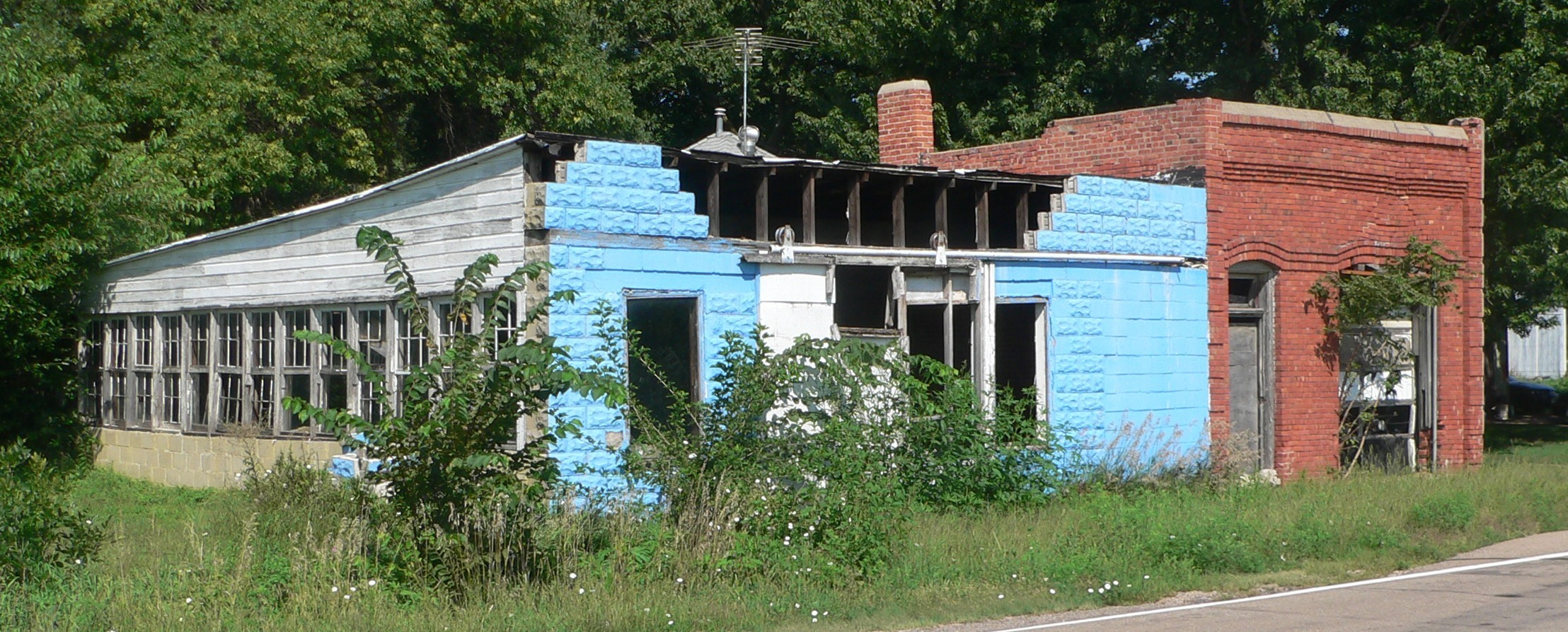
- Buildings on Showboat Boulevard in Pauline, August 2017

- Location within the state of Nebraska
- Coordinates: 40°24′59″N 98°20′44″W
- Country: United States
- State: Nebraska
- County: Adams
- Township: Little Blue
- Platted: 1887
- Named for: Pauline S. Ragan
- Elevation: 1,768 ft (539 m)
- Time zone: UTC-6 (Central (CST))
  - Summer (DST): UTC-5 (CDT)
- ZIP code: 68941
- Area code: 402
- GNIS feature ID: 832000

Pauline is an unincorporated community in Little Blue Township, Adams County, Nebraska, United States.

== History ==
Pauline was laid out in 1887 when the railroad was extended to that point. It was named for Pauline S. Ragan, the wife of a railroad official. A post office was established at Pauline in 1888, and remained in operation until it was discontinued in 1967.
