= George Jay Lapp =

American Menonite missionary (1879–1951)

George Jay Lapp (May 26, 1879 – January 25, 1951) was an American missionary to India for the Mennonites. He was ordained in 1905 and became a Bishop in 1928 while in India. Lapp served as interim president of Goshen College from February 1918 until June 1919.

== Biography ==
Born May 26, 1879, in Juniata, Nebraska, George Jay Lapp was one of Samuel W. and Sarah Gross Lapp's eight children. He attended the Elkhart Institute in 1901 and Northwestern University for two years after that. Lapp earned a B.A. from Goshen College in 1913, and an M.R.E from Bethany Seminary in 1930, and a B.D. at Goshen Biblical Seminary in 1947. George Jay Lapp died in Goshen, Indiana on January 25, 1951.

George Jay Lapp served as a missionary in the Central Provinces of India from 1905 to 1945 with several extended furloughs. He founded the Mennonite Bible School in India in 1910 and served as its director until its merger with the Dhamtari Christian Academy in 1931. Ordained in 1905, George Jay Lapp was made a bishop while in India in 1928. While Lapp is best known for his mission work, he also served on the Mennonite Board of Education and the Mennonite Publishing Board.

Lapp was a prolific essayist in the Mennonite press, particularly the Gospel Herald, the denominational newspaper of the "Old" Mennonite Church. Lapp also wrote two books about his Christian service in India: Our Mission in India: A Brief History of the American Mennonite Mission at Dhamtari, C.P., India, Together with Facts Throwing Light upon India as a Mission Field (1921), and The Christian Church and Rural India : a Report on Christian Rural Reconstruction and Welfare Service by the Christian Forces of India and Burma (1938).
