= Farrell Block =

- U.S. National Register of Historic Places
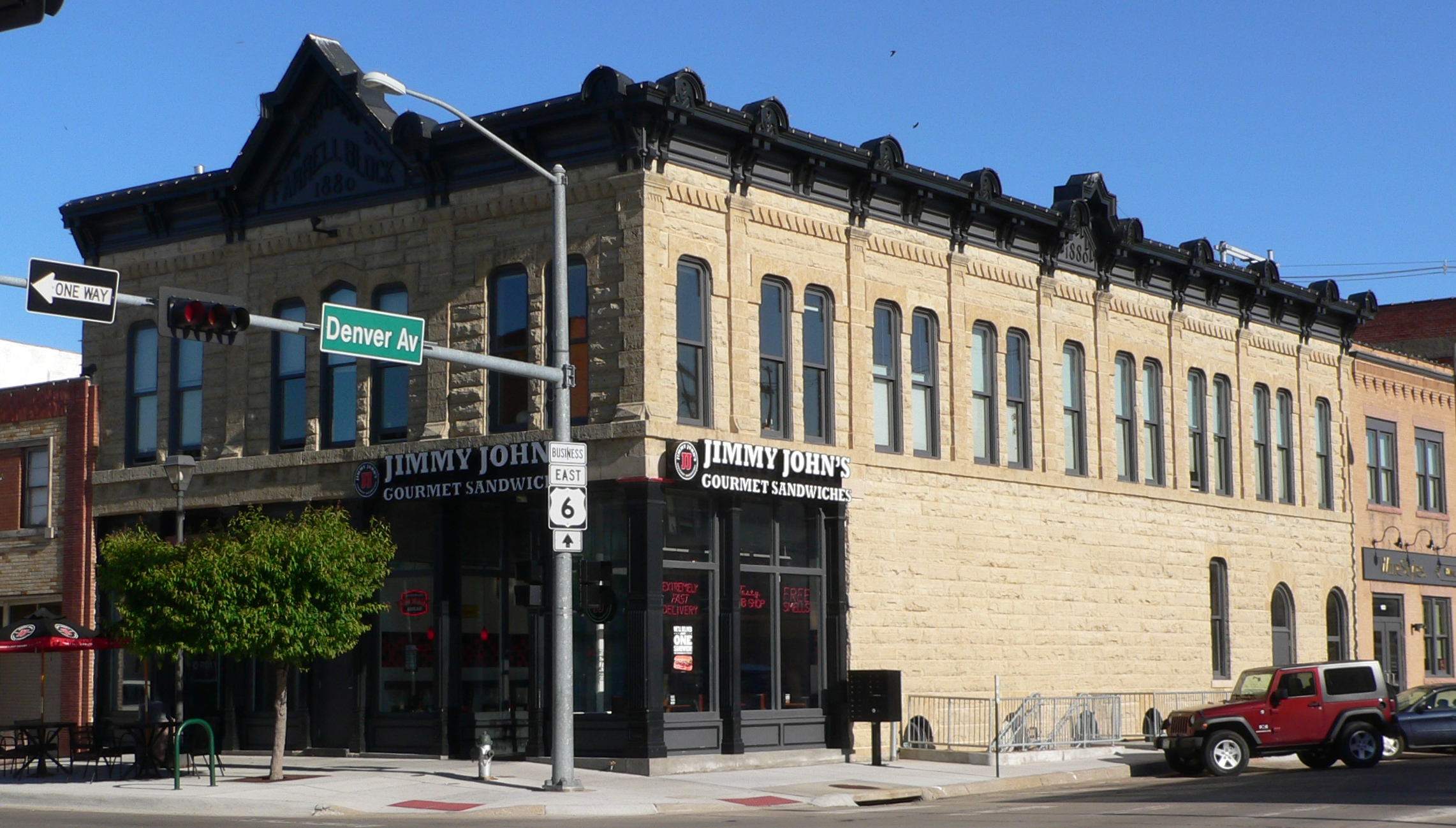
- The building in 2010

- Location within Nebraska Location within the United States
- Location: 533--537 2nd Street, and 112 Denver Avenue, Hastings, Nebraska
- Coordinates: 40°35′06″N 98°23′17″W
- Area: less than one acre
- Built: 1880
- Architect: Charles Rittenhouse
- NRHP reference No.: 79001430
- Added to NRHP: May 1, 1979

The Farrell Block is a historic commercial building in Hastings, Nebraska. It was built in 1880 for Thomas E. Farrell, a surveyor for the St. Joseph and Denver Railroad Company and a co-founder of the city of Hastings. Farrell also served on Hastings' city council in 1874, 1875, and 1887. The second floor houses the county courthouse until a courthouse was completed in 1890. The building, designed by architect Charles Rittenhouse, has been listed on the National Register of Historic Places since May 1, 1979.
