= Foote Clinic =

- U.S. National Register of Historic Places
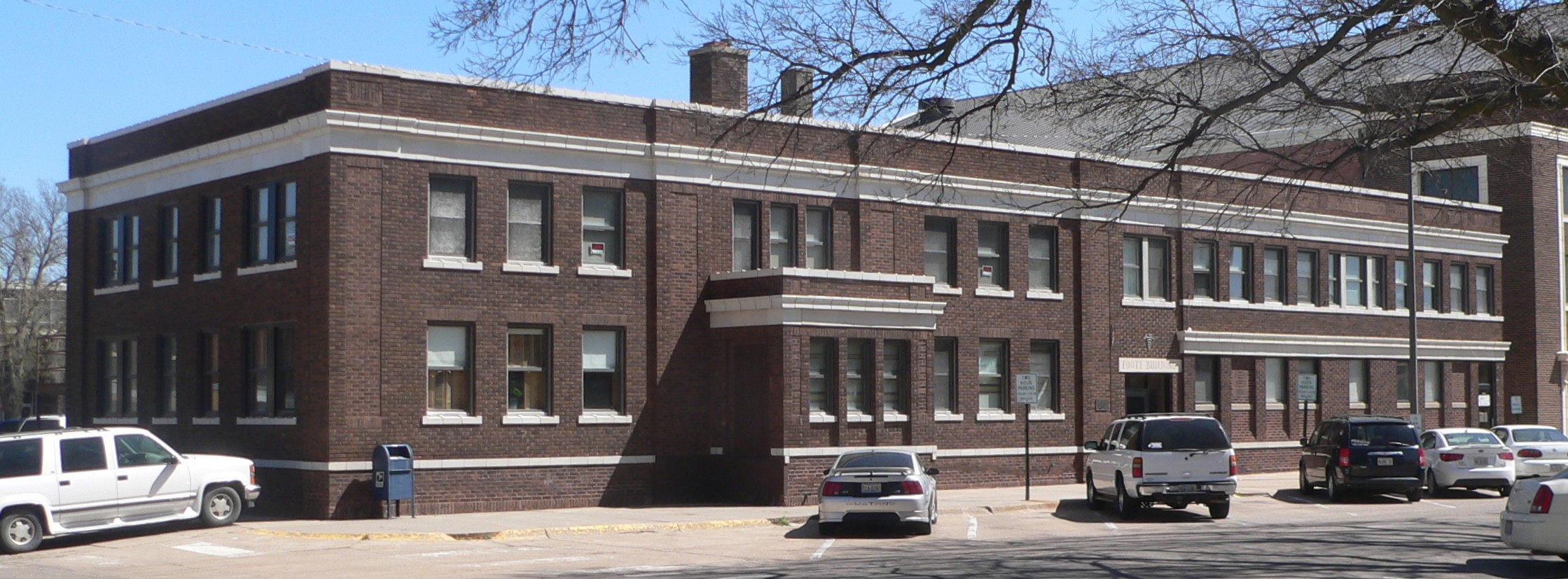
- The Foote Clinic in 2016

- Location within Nebraska Location within the United States
- Location: Hastings, Nebraska
- Coordinates: 40°35′16″N 98°23′23″W
- Built: 1924
- NRHP reference No.: 16000104
- Added to NRHP: March 22, 2016

The Foote Clinic is a historic two-story building in Hastings, Nebraska, United States. It was built in 1923-1924 for Dr. Eugene C. Foote, a physician who specialized in the treatment of the eye, the ear, the nose and the throat. Foote retired in 1968, and his sons and grandsons practised medicine in the same building; they were also specialists of the eye, the ear, the nose and the throat. The building has been listed on the National Register of Historic Places since March 22, 2016.
