= Wanda Township, Adams County, Nebraska =

Township in Adams County, Nebraska, U.S.

Coordinates: 40°34′30″N 98°39′45″W

Wanda Township is one of sixteen townships in Adams County, Nebraska, United States. The population was 133 at the 2020 census.

== See also ==
- County government in Nebraska
