= Kenesaw, Nebraska =

Village in Adams County, Nebraska, United States

- Village
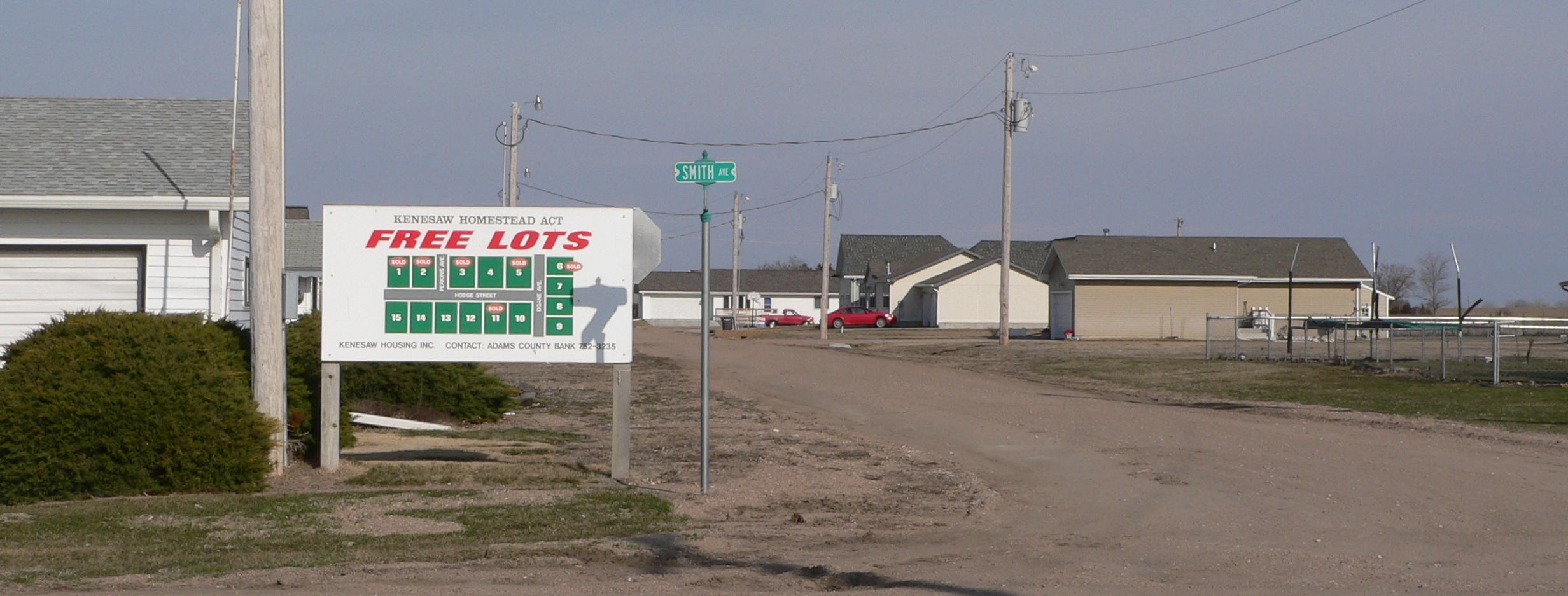
- Sign promoting Kenesaw Homestead Act at subdivision entrance, March 2010

- Logo

- Location of Kenesaw, Nebraska
- Coordinates: 40°37′08″N 98°39′27″W
- Country: United States
- State: Nebraska
- County: Adams
- Township: Kenesaw
- Founded: 1872
- Named for: Battle of Kennesaw Mountain

Area
  - Total: 1.06 sq mi (2.74 km^{2})
  - Land: 1.06 sq mi (2.74 km^{2})
  - Water: 0 sq mi (0.00 km^{2})
- Elevation: 2,051 ft (625 m)

Population (2020)
  - Total: 917
  - Estimate (2021): 913
  - Density: 867/sq mi (335/km^{2})
- Time zone: UTC-6 (Central (CST))
  - Summer (DST): UTC-5 (CDT)
- ZIP code: 68956
- Area code: 402
- FIPS code: 31-25160
- GNIS feature ID: 2398336
- Website: kenesaw.org

Kenesaw is a village in Kenesaw Township, Adams County, Nebraska, United States. The population was 917 at the 2020 census. It is part of the Hastings, Nebraska Micropolitan Statistical Area.

== History ==
Kenesaw got its start in the year 1872, following construction of the Burlington railroad through the territory. Its name commemorates the Battle of Kennesaw Mountain in the American Civil War.

In a 2004 attempt to increase the population and school enrollment, the village offered free home lots on the condition that the new owner build a house within a year. Three weeks after the publication of the offer, seven of the fifteen available lots had been claimed.

== Geography ==
According to the United States Census Bureau, the village has a total area of 0.79 square miles (2.05 km^{2}), all land.

== Demographics ==
Historical population
Census	Pop.	Note	%±
1900	504		—
1910	657		30.4%
1920	646		−1.7%
1930	614		−5.0%
1940	551		−10.3%
1950	584		6.0%
1960	546		−6.5%
1970	728		33.3%
1980	854		17.3%
1990	818		−4.2%
2000	873		6.7%
2010	880		0.8%
2020	919		4.4%
2021 (est.)	917	▼	−0.2%
U.S. Decennial Census

=== 2010 census ===
As of the census of 2010, there were 880 people, 326 households, and 227 families living in the village. The population density was 1,113.9 inhabitants per square mile (430.1/km^{2}). There were 350 housing units at an average density of 443.0 per square mile (171.0/km^{2}). The racial makeup of the village was 98.5% White, 0.1% African American, 0.2% Native American, 0.3% Asian, and 0.8% from two or more races. Hispanic or Latino of any race were 0.9% of the population.

There were 326 households, of which 36.8% had children under the age of 18 living with them, 61.0% were married couples living together, 4.9% had a female householder with no husband present, 3.7% had a male householder with no wife present, and 30.4% were non-families. 26.1% of all households were made up of individuals, and 13.5% had someone living alone who was 65 years of age or older. The average household size was 2.56 and the average family size was 3.12.

The median age in the village was 40.2 years. 26.7% of residents were under the age of 18; 6.9% were between the ages of 18 and 24; 22.8% were from 25 to 44; 26.3% were from 45 to 64; and 17.3% were 65 years of age or older. The gender makeup of the village was 48.5% male and 51.5% female.

=== 2000 census ===
As of the census of 2000, there were 873 people, 318 households, and 232 families living in the village. The population density was 1,022.0 inhabitants per square mile (394.6/km^{2}). There were 345 housing units at an average density of 403.9 per square mile (155.9/km^{2}). The racial makeup of the village was 99.20% White, 0.23% Native American, and 0.57% from two or more races. Hispanic or Latino of any race were 0.69% of the population.

There were 318 households, out of which 36.5% had children under the age of 18 living with them, 65.1% were married couples living together, 5.7% had a female householder with no husband present, and 27.0% were non-families. 24.5% of all households were made up of individuals, and 14.8% had someone living alone who was 65 years of age or older. The average household size was 2.54 and the average family size was 3.03.

In the village, the population was spread out, with 27.5% under the age of 18, 4.2% from 18 to 24, 25.5% from 25 to 44, 21.1% from 45 to 64, and 21.6% who were 65 years of age or older. The median age was 40 years. For every 100 females, there were 94.0 males. For every 100 females age 18 and over, there were 88.4 males.

As of 2000 the median income for a household in the village was $37,050, and the median income for a family was $45,500. Males had a median income of $28,125 versus $18,917 for females. The per capita income for the village was $16,206. About 2.2% of families and 3.5% of the population were below the poverty line, including 3.0% of those under age 18 and 3.8% of those age 65 or over.

== Notable people ==
- Sandy Dennis, theater and Academy Award-winning film actress, grew up in Kenesaw
