= Adams County, Nebraska =

County in Nebraska, United States

- County
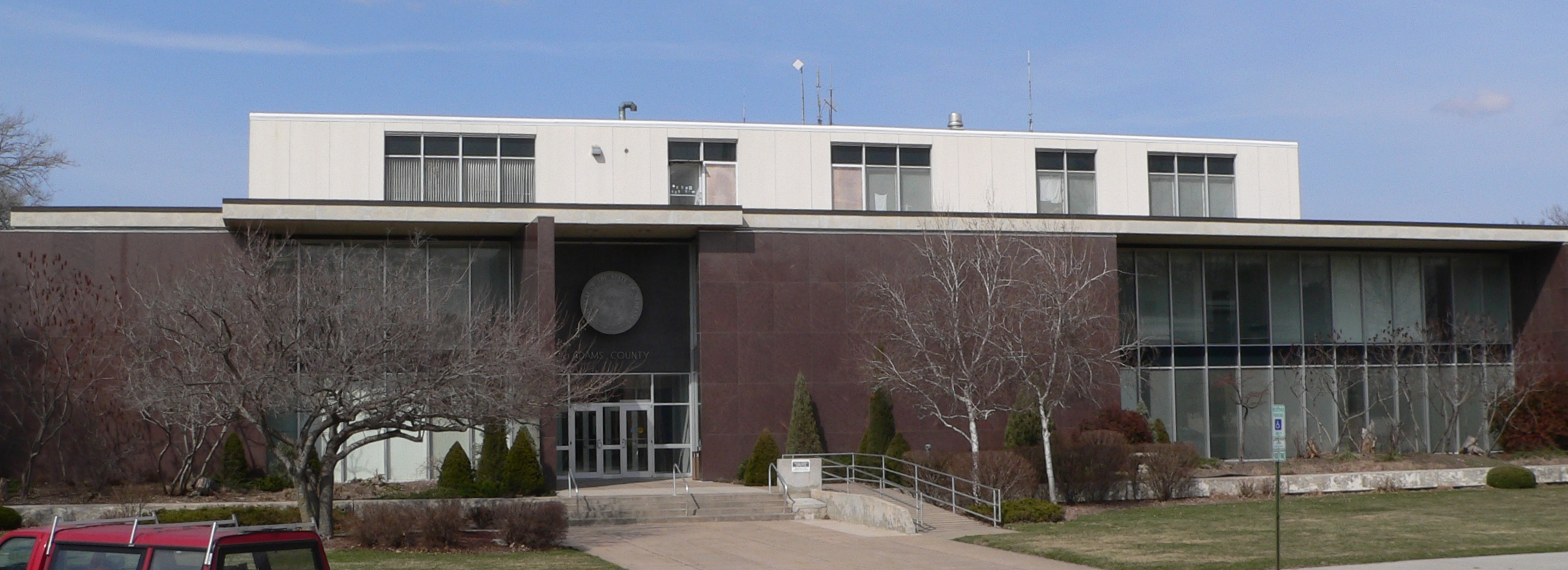
- The Adams County Courthouse in Hastings

- Location within the U.S. state of Nebraska
- Coordinates: 40.520632°N 98.500044°W
- Country: United States
- State: Nebraska
- Founded: February 16, 1867 (created); December 12, 1871 (organized)
- Named for: John Adams
- Seat: Hastings
- Largest city: Hastings

Area
  - Total: 564.231 sq mi (1,461.35 km^{2})
  - Land: 563.260 sq mi (1,458.84 km^{2})
  - Water: 0.971 sq mi (2.51 km^{2}) 0.17%

Population (2020)
  - Total: 31,205
  - Estimate (2025): 31,071 ▼
  - Density: 55.401/sq mi (21.390/km^{2})
- Time zone: UTC−6 (Central)
  - Summer (DST): UTC−5 (CDT)
- Area code: 402 and 531
- Congressional district: 3rd
- Website: adamscountyne.gov
- • Nebraska county number 01 • Nebraska license plate prefix 14

Adams County is a county located in the U.S. state of Nebraska. As of the 2020 census, the population was 31,205, and was estimated to be 31,071 in 2025. The county seat and the largest city is Hastings.

Adams County comprises the Hastings, NE Micropolitan Statistical Area.

In the Nebraska license plate system, Adams County was represented by the prefix "14" (as it had the 14th-largest number of vehicles registered in the state when the license plate system was established in 1922).

== History ==
Adams county was created on February 16, 1867 and organized on December 12, 1871. It is named for John Adams, the second President of the United States.

== Geography ==
According to the United States Census Bureau, the county has a total area of 564.231 square miles (1,461.35 km^{2}), of which 563.260 square miles (1,458.84 km^{2}) is land and 0.971 square miles (2.51 km^{2}) (0.17%) is water. It is the 66th-largest county in Nebraska by total area.

=== Major highways ===
- U.S. Highway 6
- U.S. Highway 34
- U.S. Highway 281
- Nebraska Highway 74

=== Transit ===
- Amtrak California Zephyr (Hastings station)

=== Adjacent counties ===
- Hamilton County – northeast
- Clay County – east
- Webster County – south
- Kearney County – west
- Buffalo County – northwest
- Hall County – north

== History ==
Adams County, Nebraska, was established on February 16, 1867, and named in honor of John Adams, the second President of the United States. The first settlers began to arrive in the late 1860s, following the Homestead Act of 1862, which encouraged settlement by providing land to those who would develop and farm it. The initial settlement was somewhat slow due to Adams County's location in the Great Plains, often considered inhospitable because of its harsh climate and lack of timber. The establishment of the city of Hastings in 1872 by the Burlington and Missouri River Railroad, however, marked a significant turning point. The town of Juniata was initially the county seat, but after a contentious election in 1877, Hastings became the county seat due to its strategic location at the junction of two railroads.

Adams county's growth thereafter was closely tied to the expansion of the railroad. The advent of railroad access to the county led to an influx of settlers, and by the mid-1870s, Adams County had seen substantial development in agriculture, particularly in the cultivation of wheat, corn, and other grains, as well as in the breeding of livestock. The railroad not only brought settlers but also markets for their produce, transforming Adams County into an agricultural hub.

== Demographics ==
Historical population
Census	Pop.	Note	%±
1870	19		—
1880	10,235		53,768.4%
1890	24,303		137.4%
1900	18,840		−22.5%
1910	20,900		10.9%
1920	22,621		8.2%
1930	26,275		16.2%
1940	24,576		−6.5%
1950	28,855		17.4%
1960	28,944		0.3%
1970	30,553		5.6%
1980	30,656		0.3%
1990	29,625		−3.4%
2000	31,151		5.2%
2010	31,364		0.7%
2020	31,205		−0.5%
2025 (est.)	31,071	▼	−0.4%
U.S. Decennial Census; 1790–1960 1900–1990; 1990–2000 2010–2020

=== 2020 census ===
As of the 2020 census, the county had a population of 31,205. The median age was 38.1 years. 23.6% of residents were under the age of 18 and 18.6% of residents were 65 years of age or older. For every 100 females there were 97.3 males, and for every 100 females age 18 and over there were 96.3 males age 18 and over.

The racial makeup of the county was 85.4% White, 0.8% Black or African American, 0.6% American Indian and Alaska Native, 1.4% Asian, 0.0% Native Hawaiian and Pacific Islander, 5.0% from some other race, and 6.8% from two or more races. Hispanic or Latino residents of any race comprised 11.7% of the population.

79.5% of residents lived in urban areas, while 20.5% lived in rural areas.

There were 12,690 households in the county, of which 29.0% had children under the age of 18 living with them and 26.2% had a female householder with no spouse or partner present. About 31.5% of all households were made up of individuals and 14.5% had someone living alone who was 65 years of age or older.

There were 13,806 housing units, of which 8.1% were vacant. Among occupied housing units, 66.8% were owner-occupied and 33.2% were renter-occupied. The homeowner vacancy rate was 1.4% and the rental vacancy rate was 8.2%.

=== 2000 census ===
As of the 2000 census, there were 31,151 people, 12,141 households, and 7,964 families in the county. The population density was 55 people per square mile (21 people/km^{2}). There were 13,014 housing units at an average density of 23 per square mile (8.9/km^{2}). The racial makeup of the county was 94.54% White, 0.64% Black or African American, 0.36% Native American, 1.60% Asian, 0.04% Pacific Islander, 1.99% from other races, and 0.83% from two or more races. 4.58% of the population were Hispanic or Latino of any race. 45.6% were of German, 7.9% Irish, 7.7% English and 7.3% American ancestry.

There were 12,141 households, out of which 30.90% had children under the age of 18 living with them, 54.40% were married couples living together, 8.30% had a female householder with no husband present, and 34.40% were non-families. 28.60% of all households were made up of individuals, and 13.00% had someone living alone who was 65 years of age or older. The average household size was 2.43 and the average family size was 3.00.

The county population included 24.40% under the age of 18, 11.90% from 18 to 24, 26.20% from 25 to 44, 21.70% from 45 to 64, and 15.90% who were 65 years of age or older. The median age was 36 years. For every 100 females, there were 96.10 males. For every 100 females age 18 and over, there were 92.80 males.

The median income for a household in the county was $37,160, and the median income for a family was $45,620. Males had a median income of $29,842 versus $21,236 for females. The per capita income for the county was $18,308. About 5.50% of families and 9.30% of the population were below the poverty line, including 10.40% of those under age 18 and 6.70% of those age 65 or over.

== Politics ==
Adams County voters have been strongly Republican. In only three national elections since 1916 has the county selected the Democratic Party candidate, all in national landslide victories for the party.

United States presidential election results for Adams County, Nebraska
Year	Republican		Democratic		Third party(ies)	
Year	No.	%	No.	%	No.	%
1900	1,992	47.36%	2,114	50.26%	100	2.38%
1904	2,315	60.02%	898	23.28%	644	16.70%
1908	1,987	43.81%	2,337	51.53%	211	4.65%
1912	796	19.10%	2,117	50.79%	1,255	30.11%
1916	2,041	41.93%	2,657	54.58%	170	3.49%
1920	4,849	69.19%	1,932	27.57%	227	3.24%
1924	4,824	56.51%	2,353	27.57%	1,359	15.92%
1928	7,194	70.63%	2,926	28.73%	66	0.65%
1932	3,915	39.41%	5,611	56.48%	408	4.11%
1936	4,094	38.55%	6,126	57.68%	401	3.78%
1940	6,630	60.60%	4,311	39.40%	0	0.00%
1944	7,165	60.84%	4,612	39.16%	0	0.00%
1948	5,560	54.45%	4,652	45.55%	0	0.00%
1952	9,033	70.69%	3,745	29.31%	0	0.00%
1956	8,186	66.93%	4,045	33.07%	0	0.00%
1960	7,932	64.51%	4,364	35.49%	0	0.00%
1964	5,586	46.45%	6,441	53.55%	0	0.00%
1968	7,191	63.29%	3,524	31.02%	647	5.69%
1972	8,841	72.47%	3,359	27.53%	0	0.00%
1976	7,623	59.37%	4,959	38.62%	257	2.00%
1980	8,500	65.52%	3,372	25.99%	1,101	8.49%
1984	9,127	75.09%	2,945	24.23%	83	0.68%
1988	8,073	65.59%	4,156	33.77%	79	0.64%
1992	6,365	48.36%	3,460	26.29%	3,338	25.36%
1996	6,924	55.41%	3,935	31.49%	1,637	13.10%
2000	8,162	65.62%	3,686	29.63%	590	4.74%
2004	9,233	69.49%	3,791	28.53%	262	1.97%
2008	8,252	62.47%	4,685	35.47%	273	2.07%
2012	8,316	65.64%	4,062	32.06%	292	2.30%
2016	9,287	68.73%	3,302	24.44%	924	6.84%
2020	10,085	68.83%	4,213	28.75%	355	2.42%
2024	10,077	69.92%	4,100	28.45%	235	1.63%

== Communities ==
=== City ===
- Hastings (county seat)

=== Villages ===
- Ayr
- Holstein
- Juniata
- Kenesaw
- Prosser
- Roseland
- Trumbull

=== Unincorporated communities ===
- Assumption
- Hansen
- Hayland
- Ingleside
- Pauline

=== Townships ===
- Ayr
- Blaine
- Cottonwood
- Denver
- Hanover
- Highland
- Juniata
- Kenesaw
- Little Blue
- Logan
- Roseland
- Silver Lake
- Verona
- Wanda
- West Blue
- Zero

== See also ==
- National Register of Historic Places listings in Adams County, Nebraska
