= Ingleside, Nebraska =

Unincorporated community in Adams County, Nebraska, United States

Coordinates: 40°34′48″N 98°26′39″W

Ingleside is an unincorporated community in Adams County, Nebraska, United States.

== History ==
A post office was established at Ingleside in 1905, and remained in operation until it was discontinued in 1972. Ingleside is a name meaning "fireside". It was also listed as the location of the Ingleside Hospital for the Insane (later named the Hastings State Hospital).
