= Ingleside (Safety Harbor, Florida) =

Historic house in Florida, United States

- U.S. National Register of Historic Places
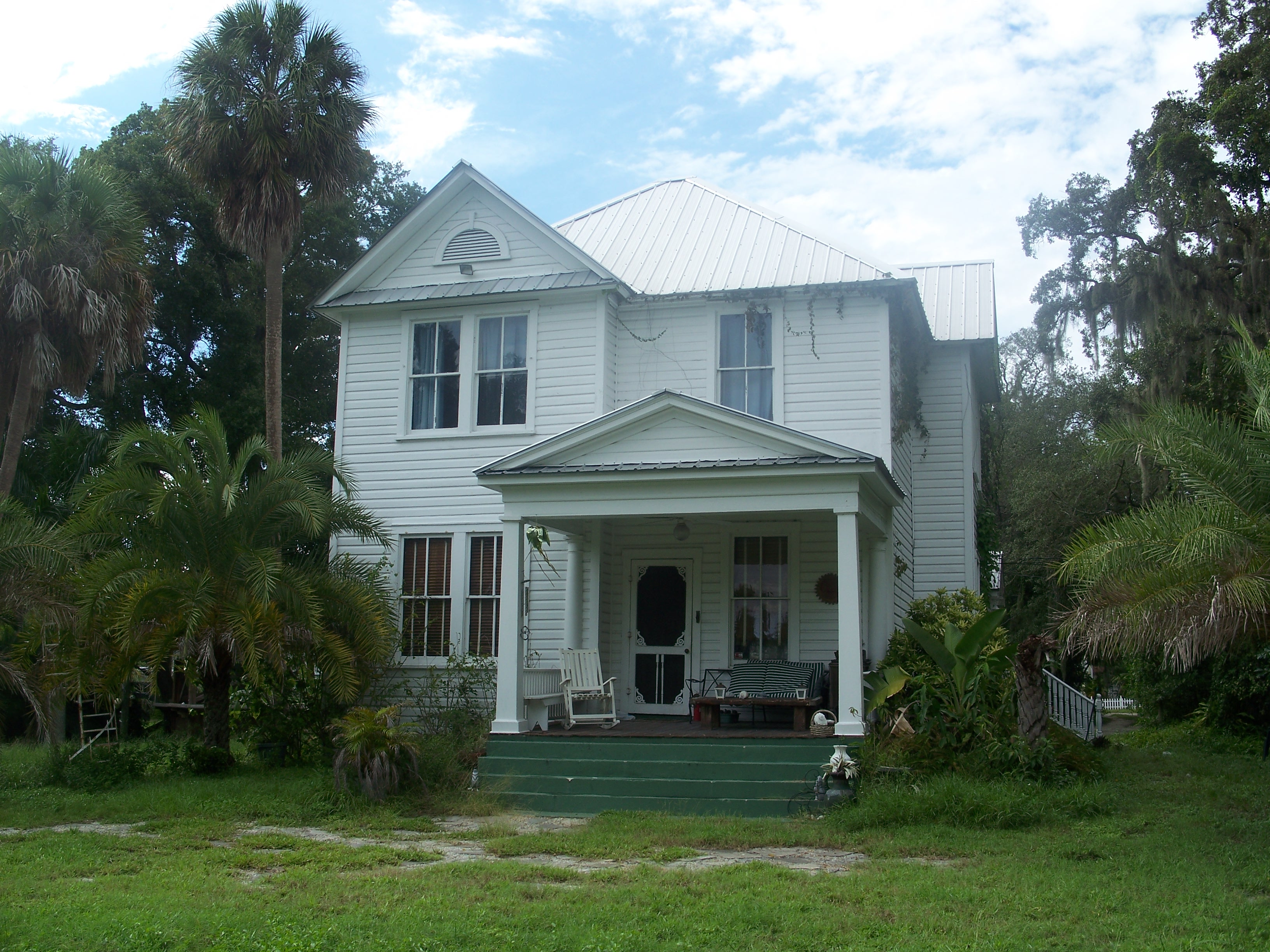

- Location within Florida Location within the United States
- Location: 333 S. Bayshore Blvd., Safety Harbor, Florida
- Coordinates: 27°59′18″N 82°41′25″W
- Built: 1889
- NRHP reference No.: 92000405
- Added to NRHP: April 28, 1992

Ingleside (also known as the William B. F. Leech House) is a historic home in Safety Harbor, Florida. It is located at 333 South Bayshore Boulevard. On April 28, 1992, it was added to the U.S. National Register of Historic Places.

== References and external links ==
- Pinellas County listings at National Register of Historic Places
- Pinellas County listings at Florida's Office of Cultural and Historical Programs

== Gallery ==
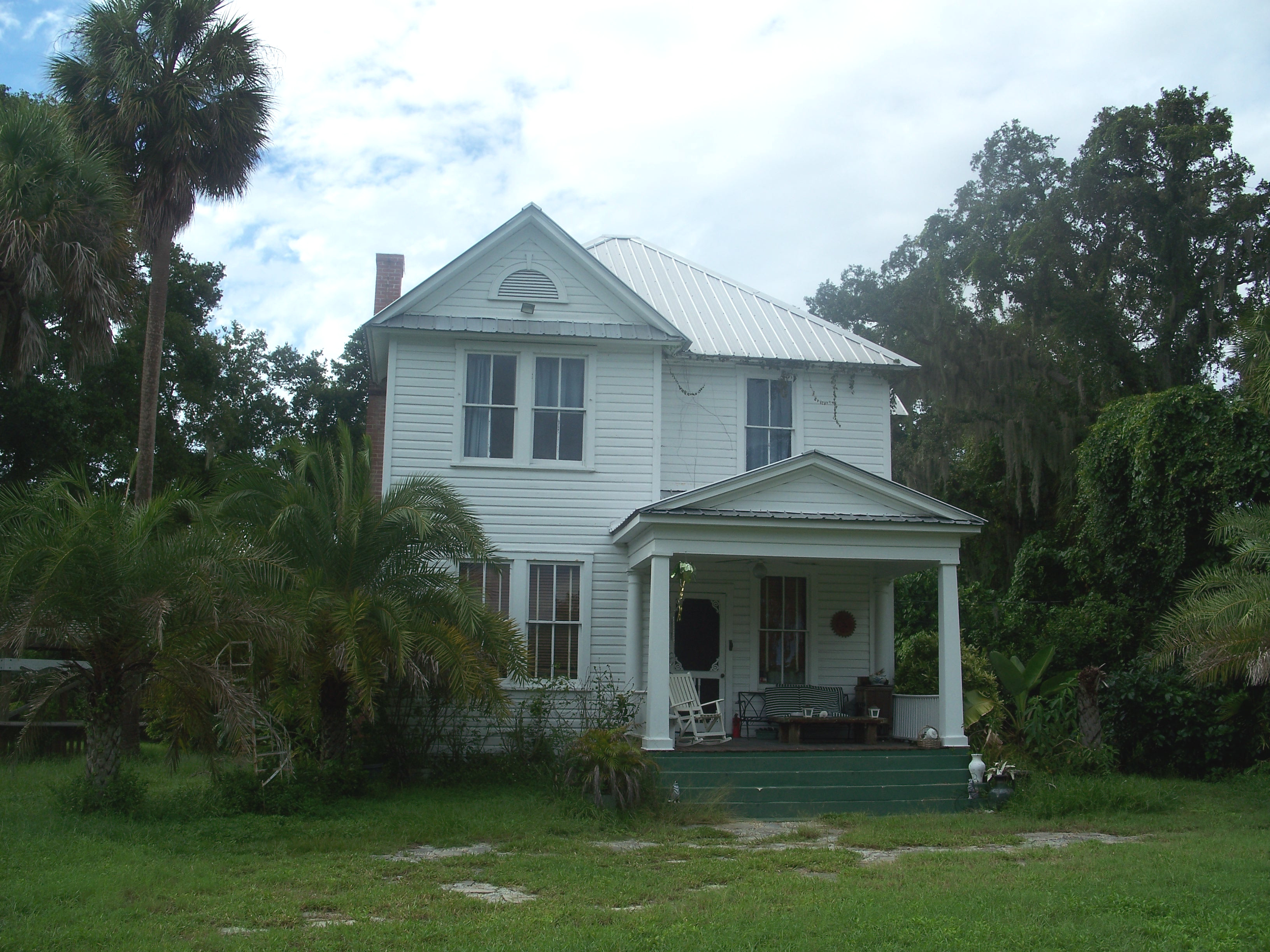

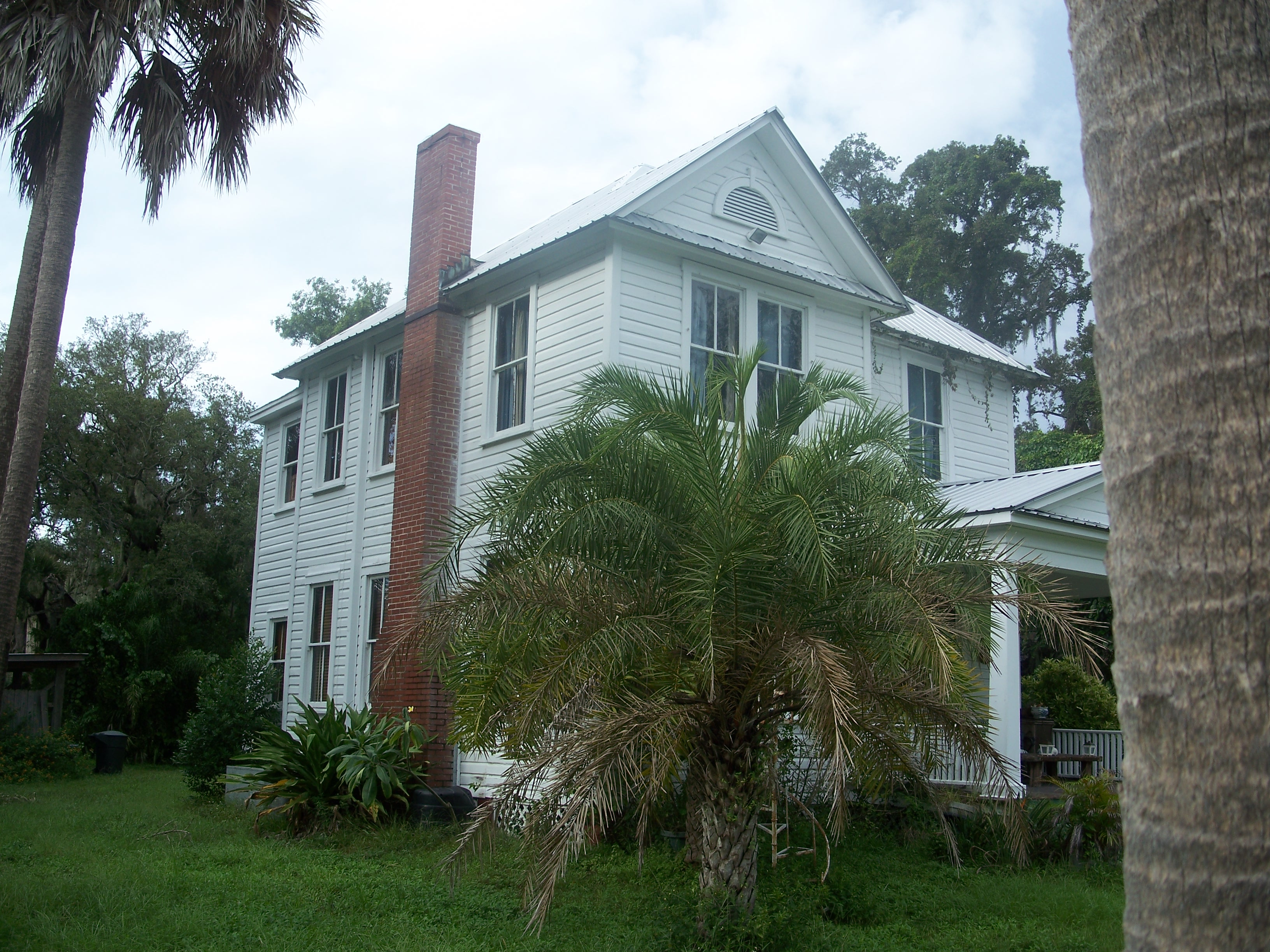

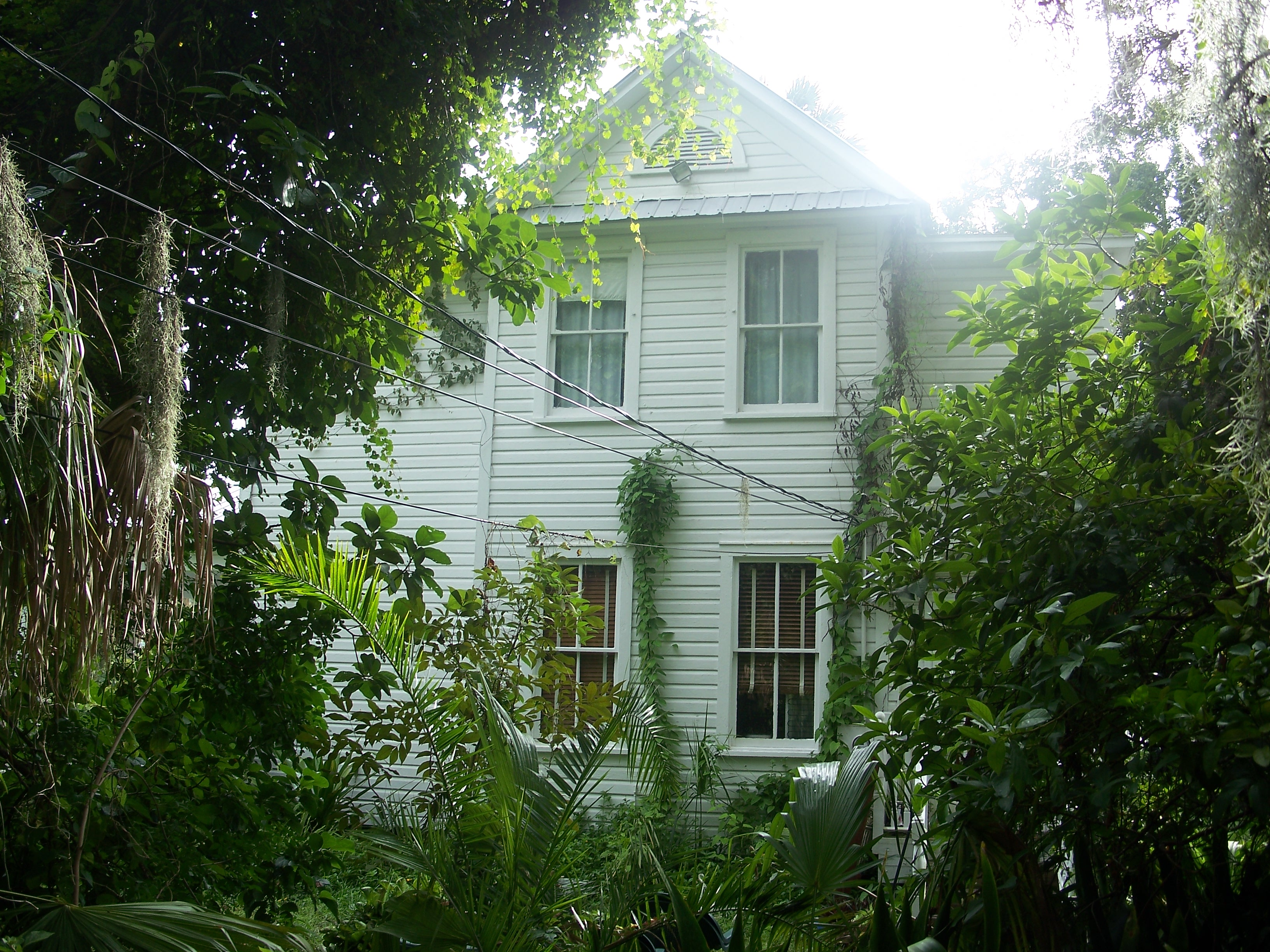
