= Hastings Brewery Building and Bottling Works =

- U.S. National Register of Historic Places
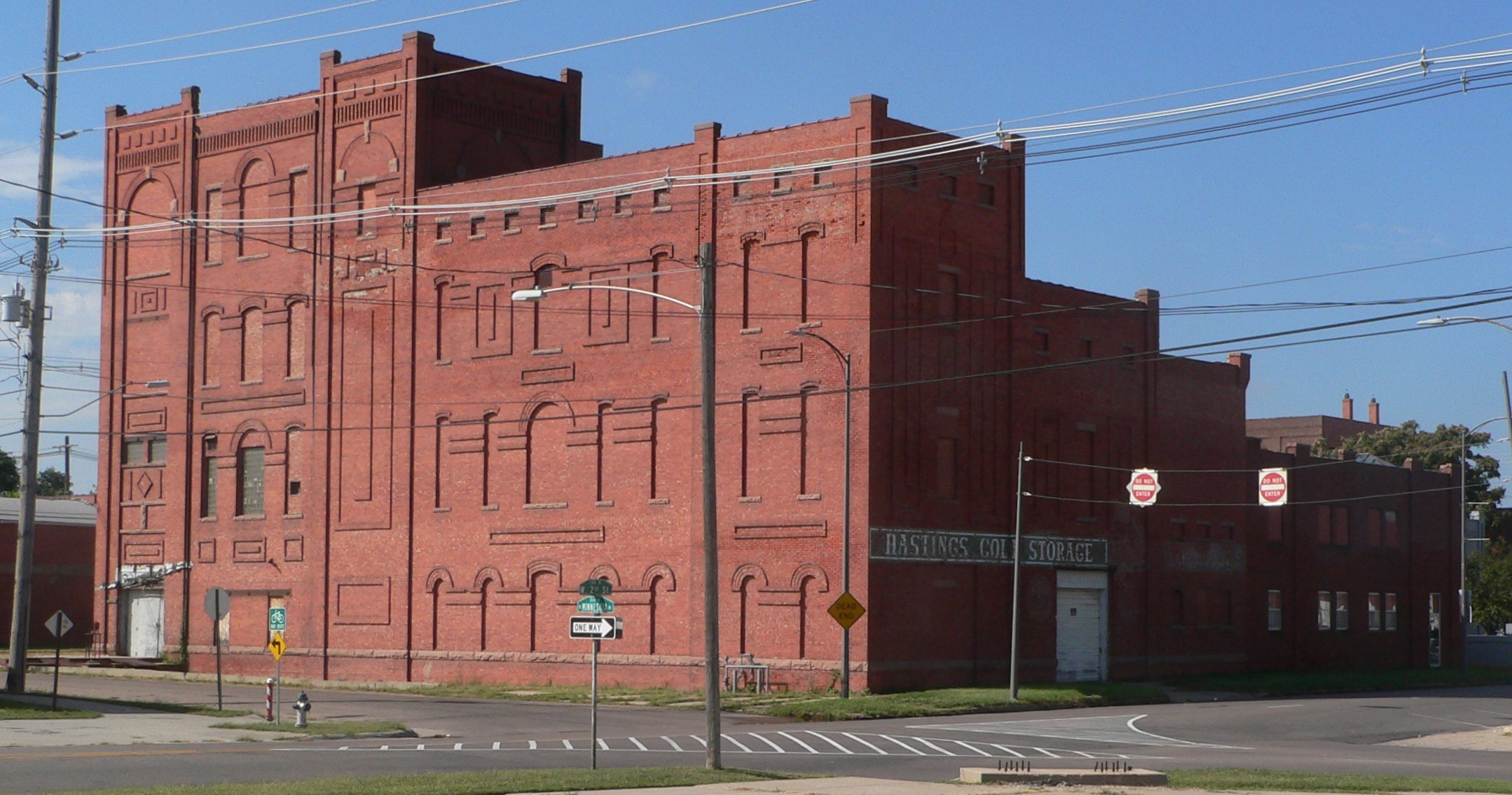
- The Hastings Brewery Building pictured in 2015
- Location: Hastings, Nebraska
- Built: 1907
- Architectural style: Rundbogenstil
- NRHP reference No.: 15000391
- Added to NRHP: 31 July 2017

Hastings Brewery Building and Bottling Works is a historic building located in Hastings, Nebraska. Built in 1907, it is notable for being a pre-Prohibition brewery and its Rundbogenstil style.

== History ==
The Hastings Brewing Company, formed in 1906, constructed the building in 1907. The company specialized in manufacturing lagers. In 1910, an accompanying bottling plant designed by C. W. Way was built. By 1911, Hastings was the second largest brewery in the state. When Prohibition went into effect in 1917, the company reorganized as Hastings Cream and Beverage Company. It produced ice cream and non-alcoholic beverages until 1919.

In 1923, Karl Kauf and George Rinderspacher moved their meat processing and grocery wholesale business into the brewery. In 1929, K & R was one of the three largest businesses in Hastings. Business boomed in the 1930s, allowing them to add new storage facilities and equipment. Sometime in the 1980s, the building stopped its meat and food processing operations and was used as cold storage.

In 1988, the building was sold to Terrance Welsh and Tom Di Martino of T & T Enterprises. It was presumably used as a warehouse. In 2013, the building was sold and in 2018, opened as an affordable apartment complex.
