= Juniata, Nebraska =

Village in Adams County, Nebraska, United States

- Village
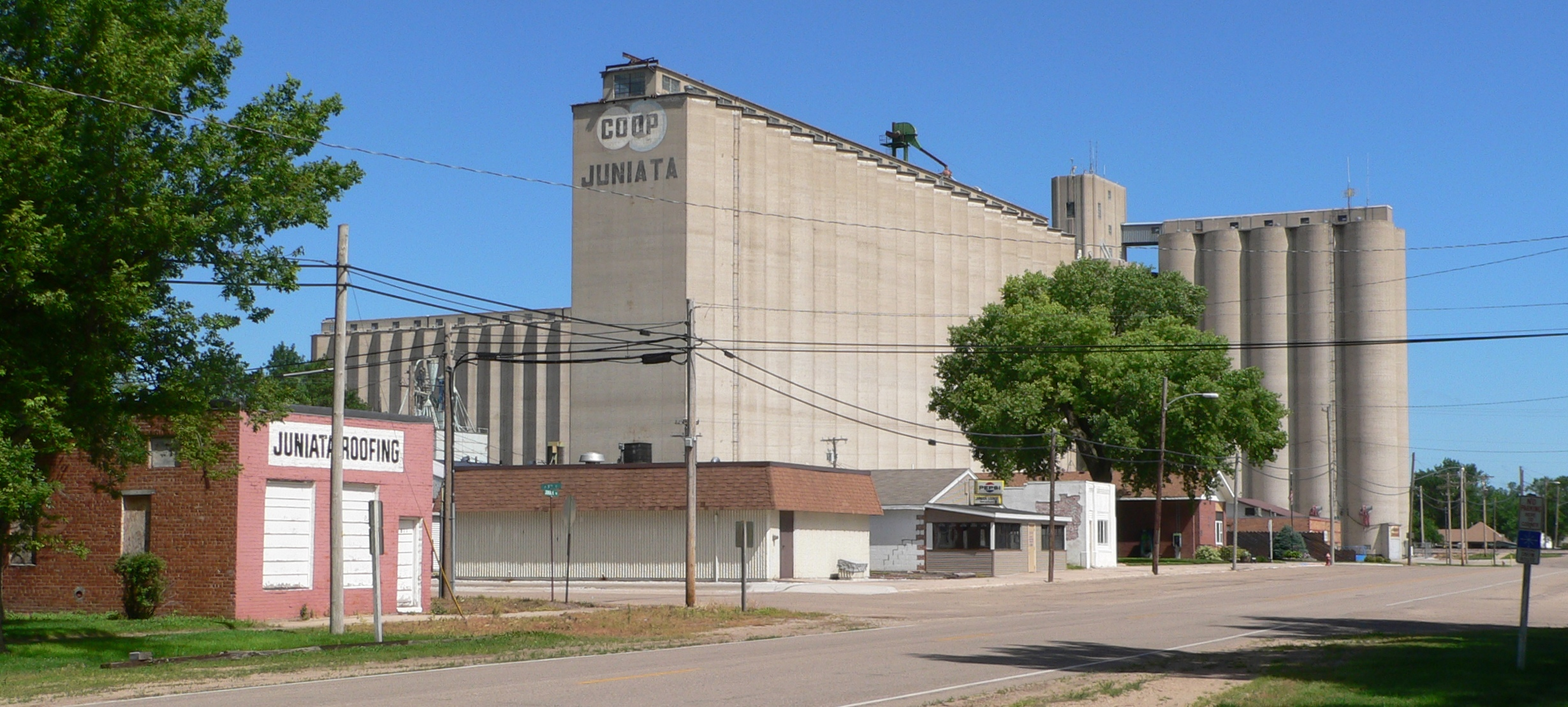
- Downtown Juniata and grain elevators, June 2010

- Location of Juniata, Nebraska
- Coordinates: 40°35′25″N 98°30′25″W
- Country: United States
- State: Nebraska
- County: Adams
- Township: Juniata
- Founded: 1871
- Named for: Juniata River

Area
  - Total: 0.68 sq mi (1.75 km^{2})
  - Land: 0.68 sq mi (1.75 km^{2})
  - Water: 0 sq mi (0.00 km^{2})
- Elevation: 1,965 ft (599 m)

Population (2020)
  - Total: 744
  - Estimate (2021): 740
  - Density: 1,100/sq mi (425/km^{2})
- Time zone: UTC-6 (Central (CST))
  - Summer (DST): UTC-5 (CDT)
- ZIP code: 68955
- Area code: 402
- FIPS code: 31-24950
- GNIS feature ID: 2398318
- Website: villageofjuniata.com

Juniata is a village in Juniata Township, Adams County, Nebraska, United States. The population was 744 at the 2020 census. It is part of the Hastings, Nebraska Micropolitan Statistical Area.

== History ==
Juniata was named by the Burlington Railroad for a river in Pennsylvania and is the oldest town in Adams County. It was platted, organized, and became the county seat in late 1871, the first school district in the county was established there, and the first newspaper in the county, the Adams County Gazette, was published there. During the 1870s the Commercial Hotel, south of the railroad depot, was one of the largest in Nebraska west of Lincoln. It was demolished in 1879. On April 12, 1872, the county commissioners declined a request from the St. Joseph and Denver City Railroad for $75,000 in bonds to build 25 miles of track, reasoning that the line would be built anyway and would logically cross the Burlington line at Juniata. Instead the railroad laid its tracks seven miles east and set up the new town of Hastings, which in September 1878 won a five-year Great County Seat War and became the county seat. Juniata continued to grow and now has more residents than in the 1880s. However, it has suffered a number of disastrous fires, the last in 1961, and in 1960 a tornado destroyed the 2-story town pump with bandstand that had been built in 1904 at the intersection of Juniata Avenue and Tenth Street. Because of its proximity to Hastings, Juniata is today a commuter suburb.

== Geography ==
According to the United States Census Bureau, the village has a total area of 0.68 square miles (1.76 km^{2}), all land.

== Demographics ==
Historical population
| Census | Pop. | Note | %± |
|---|---|---|---|
| 1880 | 494 | | — |
| 1890 | 528 | | 6.9% |
| 1900 | 543 | | 2.8% |
| 1910 | 471 | | −13.3% |
| 1920 | 329 | | −30.1% |
| 1930 | 367 | | 11.6% |
| 1940 | 338 | | −7.9% |
| 1950 | 365 | | 8.0% |
| 1960 | 422 | | 15.6% |
| 1970 | 480 | | 13.7% |
| 1980 | 703 | | 46.5% |
| 1990 | 811 | | 15.4% |
| 2000 | 693 | | −14.5% |
| 2010 | 755 | | 8.9% |
| 2020 | 748 | | −0.9% |
| 2021 (est.) | 740 | ▼ | −1.1% |
U.S. Decennial Census

=== 2010 census ===
As of the census of 2010, there were 755 people, 299 households, and 214 families residing in the village. The population density was 1,110.3 inhabitants per square mile (428.7/km^{2}). There were 312 housing units at an average density of 458.8 per square mile (177.1/km^{2}). The racial makeup of the village was 95.1% White, 0.1% African American, 0.5% Native American, 0.1% Asian, 3.2% from other races, and 0.9% from two or more races. Hispanic or Latino of any race were 3.4% of the population.

There were 299 households, of which 36.5% had children under the age of 18 living with them, 53.5% were married couples living together, 11.4% had a female householder with no husband present, 6.7% had a male householder with no wife present, and 28.4% were non-families. 24.1% of all households were made up of individuals, and 6.7% had someone living alone who was 65 years of age or older. The average household size was 2.53 and the average family size was 2.98.

The median age in the village was 39.7 years. 26.2% of residents were under the age of 18; 7.5% were between the ages of 18 and 24; 23.7% were from 25 to 44; 33.2% were from 45 to 64; and 9.5% were 65 years of age or older. The gender makeup of the village was 51.8% male and 48.2% female.

=== 2000 census ===
As of the census of 2000, there were 693 people, 274 households, and 198 families residing in the village. The population density was 1,319.3 inhabitants per square mile (509.4/km^{2}). There were 295 housing units at an average density of 561.6 per square mile (216.8/km^{2}). The racial makeup of the village was 98.56% White, 0.43% African American, 0.29% Native American, 0.14% Asian, and 0.58% from two or more races. Hispanic or Latino of any race were 0.58% of the population.

There were 274 households, out of which 37.6% had children under the age of 18 living with them, 56.2% were married couples living together, 10.9% had a female householder with no husband present, and 27.4% were non-families. 23.7% of all households were made up of individuals, and 5.5% had someone living alone who was 65 years of age or older. The average household size was 2.53 and the average family size was 2.99.

In the village, the population was spread out, with 28.7% under the age of 18, 7.6% from 18 to 24, 29.6% from 25 to 44, 25.1% from 45 to 64, and 8.9% who were 65 years of age or older. The median age was 36 years. For every 100 females, there were 99.1 males. For every 100 females age 18 and over, there were 101.6 males.

As of 2000 the median income for a household in the village was $32,833, and the median income for a family was $39,250. Males had a median income of $26,300 versus $21,750 for females. The per capita income for the village was $15,009. About 6.2% of families and 8.5% of the population were below the poverty line, including 14.3% of those under age 18 and none of those age 65 or over.

== Notable people ==
- George Jay Lapp, Mennonite bishop

== See also ==
- List of municipalities in Nebraska
