= Patrick Thomas Leonard =

Patrick Thomas Leonard Sr.
- Born: 1828; Broadford, County Clare, Ireland
- Died: March 1, 1905 (aged 76–77)
- Military career
- Allegiance: United States of America
- Branch: United States Army
- Rank: Sergeant
- Units: Company A, 23d U.S. Infantry
- Conflicts: Indian Wars
- Awards: Medal of Honor

Patrick Thomas Leonard (1828 – March 1, 1905) was a United States Army sergeant who received the Medal of Honor during the Indian Wars. Until 1984, it was believed that Leonard was a double recipient of the Medal of Honor. However, another Irishman, Patrick James Leonard had also received the Medal of Honor.

== Early life and education ==
Leonard was born in Broadford, County Clare, Ireland, to John and Mary Leonard.

== Marriage and family ==
Patrick Thomas Leonard married Ellen Connaughton. Together they had five children: Mary, Patrick Thomas Leonard Jr., Margaret, John (Ireland) and Ellen M. (New York).

== Military career ==
Leonard enlisted at Camp Three Forks, Idaho Territory, and was stationed there during the late 1860s and early 1870s. His actions as a corporal at Grace Creek near Fort Hartsuff, Nebraska on April 28, 1876, lead to him being awarded the Medal of Honor on August 26, 1876. By the time of his death, he had been promoted to sergeant, as can be seen on his gravestone.

== Death and legacy ==
Leonard died of paralysis at his home in Leavenworth, Kansas, on March 1, 1905, and he was buried in Mount Calvary Cemetery in Lansing, Kansas.

== Medal of Honor citation ==
Rank and organization: Corporal, Company A, 23d U.S. Infantry. Place and date: Near Fort Hartsuff, Nebr., April 28, 1876. Entered service at:------. Birth: Ireland. Date of issue: August 26, 1876.

Citation:

Gallantry in charge on hostile Sioux.

== See also ==
- List of Medal of Honor recipients
- List of Medal of Honor recipients for the Indian Wars
