= Juniata Township, Adams County, Nebraska =

Township in Nebraska, United States

Coordinates: 40°33′56″N 98°33′23″W

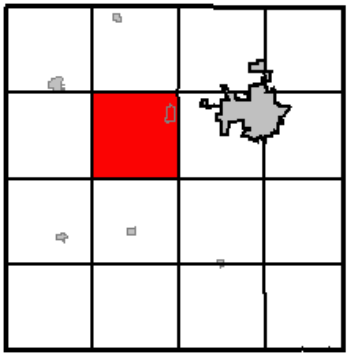
Map of Adams County highlighting Juniata Township.

Juniata Township is one of sixteen townships in Adams County, Nebraska, United States. The population was 957 at the 2020 census.

The village of Juniata lies within the township. The ZIP Code for Juniata Township is 68955.

== See also ==
- County government in Nebraska
