= Cottonwood Township, Nance County, Nebraska =

Cottonwood Township
- Township
- Location in Nance County
- Coordinates: 41°20′06″N 098°13′30″W
- Country: United States
- State: Nebraska
- County: Nance

Area
  - Total: 46.56 sq mi (120.59 km^{2})
  - Land: 45.64 sq mi (118.22 km^{2})
  - Water: 0.92 sq mi (2.37 km^{2}) 1.97%
- Elevation: 1,949 ft (594 m)

Population (2020)
  - Total: 63
  - Density: 1.4/sq mi (0.53/km^{2})
- GNIS feature ID: 0837942

Cottonwood Township is one of twelve townships in Nance County, Nebraska, United States. The population was 63 according to the 2020 census. A 2021 estimate placed the township's population at 63 people.

== See also ==
- County government in Nebraska
