= Roseland Township, Adams County, Nebraska =

Township in Nebraska, United States

Coordinates: 40°29′18″N 98°33′07″W

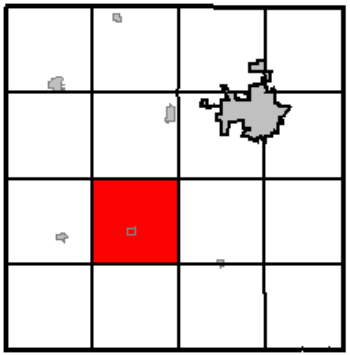
Map of Adams County highlighting Roseland Township.

Roseland Township is one of sixteen townships in Adams County, Nebraska, United States. The population was 431 at the 2020 census.

The village of Roseland lies within the township.

== See also ==
- County government in Nebraska
