= West Blue Township, Fillmore County, Nebraska =

West Blue Township
- Township
- Location in Fillmore County
- Coordinates: 40°39′26″N 097°39′08″W
- Country: United States
- State: Nebraska
- County: Fillmore

Area
  - Total: 36.17 sq mi (93.68 km^{2})
  - Land: 36.16 sq mi (93.66 km^{2})
  - Water: 0.0077 sq mi (0.02 km^{2}) 0.02%
- Elevation: 1,600 ft (500 m)

Population (2020)
  - Total: 66 ▼
  - Density: 1.8/sq mi (0.70/km^{2})
- GNIS feature ID: 0838323

West Blue Township is one of fifteen townships in Fillmore County, Nebraska, United States. The population was 66 at the 2020 census.

A small portion of the village of Fairmont lies within the township.

== See also ==
- County government in Nebraska
