= Cottonwood Township, Phelps County, Nebraska =

Cottonwood Township
- Township
- Location in Phelps County
- Coordinates: 40°38′57″N 099°17′21″W
- Country: United States
- State: Nebraska
- County: Phelps

Area
  - Total: 37.53 sq mi (97.19 km^{2})
  - Land: 37.47 sq mi (97.05 km^{2})
  - Water: 0.054 sq mi (0.14 km^{2}) 0.14%
- Elevation: 2,221 ft (677 m)

Population (2000)
  - Total: 73
  - Density: 2.1/sq mi (0.8/km^{2})
- GNIS feature ID: 0837943

Cottonwood Township is one of 14 townships in Phelps County, Nebraska, United States. The population was 73 at the 2000 census. A 2006 estimate placed the township's population at 76.
