= Cottonwood Township, Adams County, Nebraska =

Township in Nebraska, United States

Coordinates: 40°28′51″N 98°40′00″W

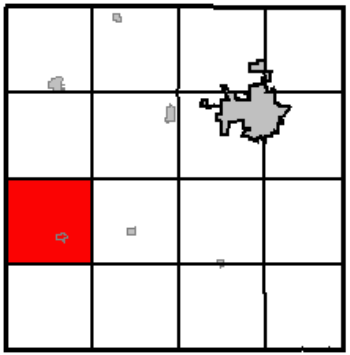
Map of Adams County highlighting Cottonwood Township

Cottonwood Township is one of sixteen townships in Adams County, Nebraska, United States. The population was 282 at the 2020 census.

The village of Holstein lies within the township.

== See also ==
- County government in Nebraska
