= West Blue Township, Adams County, Nebraska =

Township in Nebraska, United States

Coordinates: 40°39′01″N 98°19′31″W

West Blue Township is one of sixteen townships in Adams County, Nebraska, United States. The population was 307 at the 2020 census.

== See also ==
- County government in Nebraska
