= Little Blue Township, Adams County, Nebraska =

Township in Nebraska, United States

Coordinates: 40°23′22″N 98°19′31″W

Little Blue Township is one of sixteen townships located in Adams County, Nebraska, United States. The population was 193 at the 2020 census.

== See also ==
- County government in Nebraska
