= National Register of Historic Places listings in Clay County, Nebraska =

Location of Clay County in Nebraska

Clay County, Nebraska, United States, has 10 properties and districts listed on the National Register of Historic Places.

This National Park Service list is complete through NPS recent listings posted October 30, 2026.

== Current listings ==
	Name on the Register	Image	Date listed	Location	City or town	Description
1	Isaac Newton Clark House	Isaac Newton Clark House	December 15, 1983 (#83003985)	407 W. Cedar St. 40°36′36″N 97°51′52″W	Sutton	c. 1877 frame house of a town founder who championed local rail access and commerce. Built in the Gothic Revival style, which is rare in Nebraska.
2	Clay Center Library and Gymnasium	Clay Center Library and Gymnasium	March 4, 2022 (#100007503)	117 West Edgar St. 40°31′15″N 98°03′19″W	Clay Center	
3	Clay County Courthouse	Clay County Courthouse	January 10, 1990 (#89002240)	Fairfield St. between Alexander and Brown Aves. 40°31′16″N 98°03′18″W	Clay Center	Brick Beaux-Arts county courthouse with terracotta trim, designed by William F. Gernandt and built 1917–19.
4	Deering Bridge	Deering Bridge	June 29, 1992 (#92000748)	County road over School Creek, 2 miles north and 2 miles east of Sutton; 40°38′25″N 97°49′29″W	Sutton	Exemplary 50-foot (15 m) concrete arch bridge built in 1916. Extends into Fillmore County.
5	Fairfield Carnegie Library	Fairfield Carnegie Library	November 29, 2001 (#01001274)	412 N. D St. 40°25′52″N 98°06′20″W	Fairfield	1913 brick Carnegie library with an unusual degree of exterior and interior integrity.
6	Glenvil Fire Hall and Town Jail	Glenvil Fire Hall and Town Jail	July 13, 2022 (#100007937)	Blk. 6, Lot 19 Winters Ave. 40°30′15″N 98°15′06″W	Glenvil	
7	Glenville School	Glenville School	December 31, 1998 (#98001566)	401 S. 5th St. 40°30′08″N 98°15′23″W	Glenvil	1903 public school expanded in 1924 to house kindergarten through high school.
8	Harvard Carnegie Library	Harvard Carnegie Library	March 8, 2022 (#100007504)	309 North Clay St. 40°37′09″N 98°05′50″W	Harvard	
9	Inland School	Inland School	March 28, 2002 (#02000271)	Junction of NWC East Ave. and Edison St. 40°35′37″N 98°13′23″W	Inland	1924 public school that housed kindergarten through high school.
10	St. Martin's Catholic Church	St. Martin's Catholic Church	September 26, 1985 (#85002574)	Northwest of Deweese; 40°21′53″N 98°11′42″W	Deweese	1907 Gothic Revival church designed by James H. Craddock for a Czech immigrant congregation.

== See also ==
- List of National Historic Landmarks in Nebraska
- National Register of Historic Places listings in Nebraska
