= National Register of Historic Places listings in Burt County, Nebraska =

Location of Burt County in Nebraska

Burt County, Nebraska, United States, has 14 properties and districts listed on the National Register of Historic Places.

The sites and districts for which geographic coordinates are listed below can be viewed on a map.

== Current listings ==
	Name on the Register	Image	Date listed	Location	City or town	Description
1	Edward W. and Rose Folsom Bryant House	Edward W. and Rose Folsom Bryant House	August 5, 2004 (#04000804)	104 S. 16th St. 41°46′41″N 96°13′33″W	Tekamah	
2	Burt County Courthouse	Burt County Courthouse	January 10, 1990 (#89002223)	13th St. between M and N Sts. 41°46′43″N 96°13′13″W	Tekamah	
3	Burt County State Bank	Burt County State Bank	March 4, 2009 (#09000068)	246 South 13th Street; 41°46′34″N 96°13′17″W	Tekamah	
4	Deutsche Evangelische Lutherische St. Johannes Kirche	Deutsche Evangelische Lutherische St. Johannes Kirche	August 2, 1982 (#82003183)	Western edge of Section 8, Township 22 North, Range 9 East; 41°53′37″N 96°26′39″W	Lyons	
5	A.B. Fuller House	A.B. Fuller House	July 1, 2020 (#100005334)	400 8th St. 42°00′23″N 96°15′00″W	Decatur	
6	William and Emma Guhl Farmhouse	William and Emma Guhl Farmhouse	July 2, 2008 (#08000600)	1560 Nebraska Highway 77; 41°53′44″N 96°27′50″W	Oakland	
7	E.C. Houston House	E.C. Houston House	March 13, 1986 (#86000338)	319 N. 13th St. 41°46′53″N 96°13′14″W	Tekamah	
8	Logan Creek Site	Logan Creek Site	January 26, 1970 (#70000367)	Address Restricted	Oakland	
9	Oakland City Auditorium	Oakland City Auditorium	March 26, 2019 (#100003570)	401 N. Oakland Ave. 41°50′13″N 96°28′00″W	Oakland	
10	H.S.M. Spielman House	H.S.M. Spielman House	July 17, 1986 (#86001713)	1103 I St. 41°46′24″N 96°13′06″W	Tekamah	Home of farmer H.S.M. Spielman; vernacular Queen Anne style with Neoclassical Revival details.
11	John Henry Stork Log House	John Henry Stork Log House	May 29, 1980 (#80002442)	Southwestern corner of Section 26, Township 21 North, Range 11 East; 41°45′24″N 96°09′04″W	Tekamah	
12	Tekamah Auditorium	Tekamah Auditorium	March 5, 2018 (#100002164)	1315 K St. 41°46′34″N 96°13′19″W	Tekamah	
13	Tekamah Carnegie Library	Tekamah Carnegie Library	March 15, 2005 (#05000155)	204 S. 13th St. 41°46′37″N 96°13′17″W	Tekamah	
14	Tekamah City Bridge	Tekamah City Bridge	June 29, 1992 (#92000766)	U.S. Route 75 over Tekamah Creek; 41°46′36″N 96°13′15″W	Tekamah	

== See also ==
- List of National Historic Landmarks in Nebraska
- National Register of Historic Places listings in Nebraska
