= Burt County State Bank =

- U.S. National Register of Historic Places
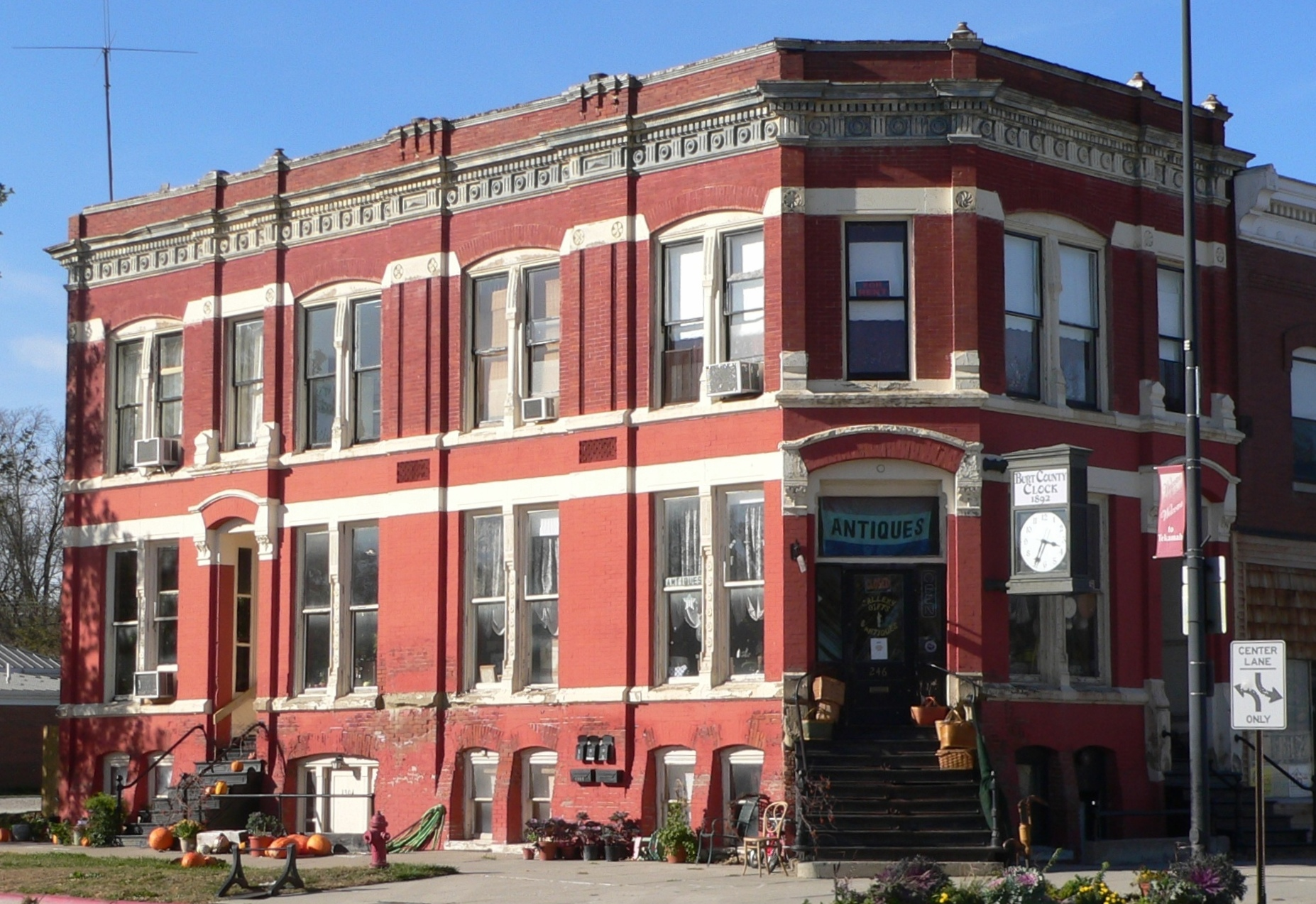
- The building in 2010

- Location within Nebraska Location within the United States
- Location: 246 South 13th Street, Tekamah, Nebraska
- Coordinates: 41°46′34″N 96°13′17″W
- Area: less than one acre
- Built: 1884
- Architectural style: Early Commercial
- NRHP reference No.: 09000068
- Added to NRHP: March 4, 2009

The Burt County State Bank is a historic building in Tekamah, Nebraska. It was built in 1884, and designed in the Commercial style. The first floor housed the Burt County State Bank, run by H. M. Hopewell and Wellington Harington, and the second floor housed law firm offices. It has been listed on the National Register of Historic Places since March 4, 2009.
