= E.C. Houston House =

Historic house in Tekamah, Nebraska

- E. C. Houston House
- U.S. National Register of Historic Places
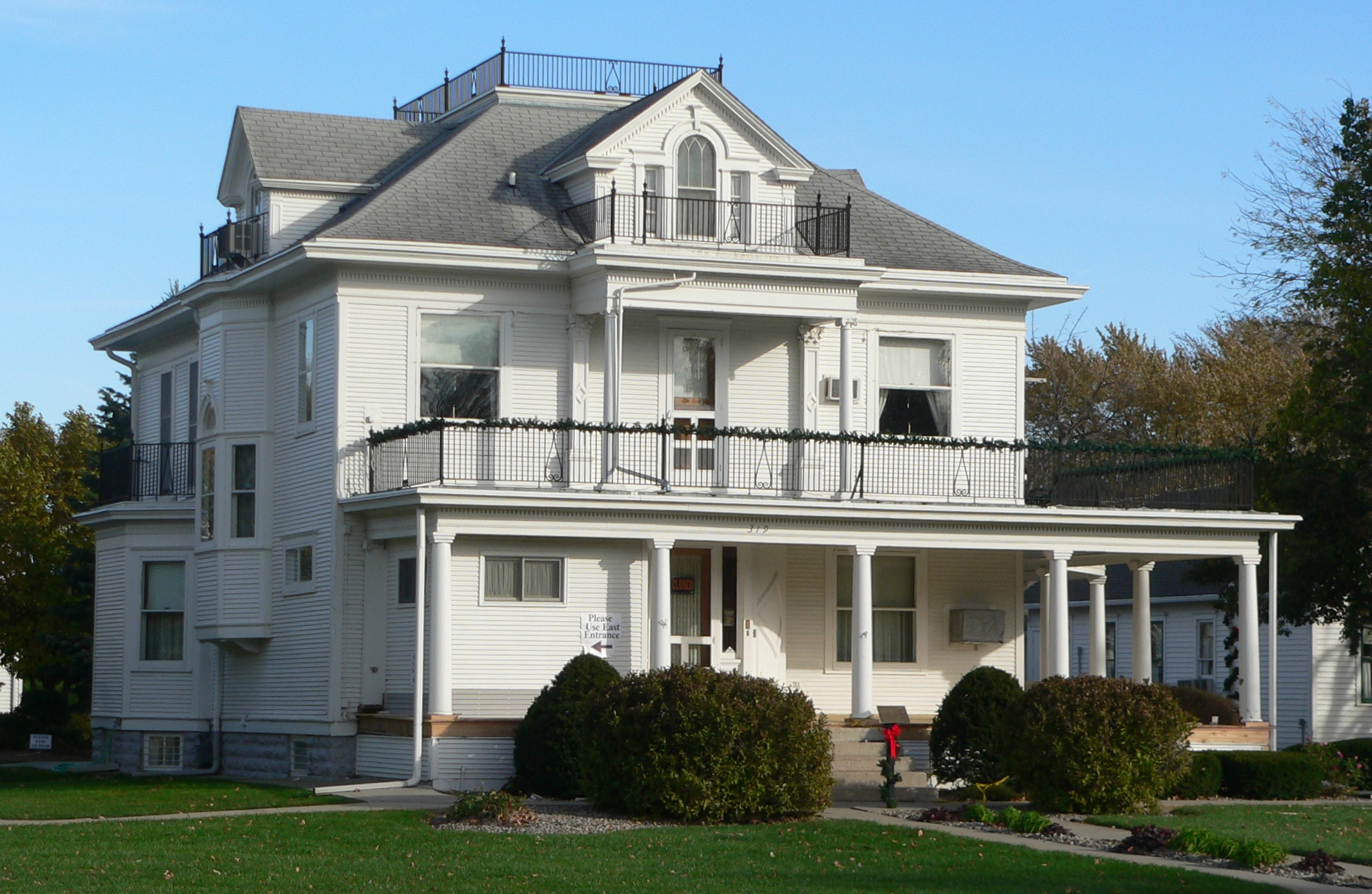
- The house in 2010

- Location within Nebraska Location within the United States
- Location: 319 North Thirteenth Street, Tekamah, Nebraska
- Coordinates: 41°46′53″N 96°13′14″W
- Area: less than one acre
- Built: 1904
- Built by: Joseph Wixer
- Architectural style: Classical Revival
- NRHP reference No.: 86000338
- Added to NRHP: March 13, 1986

The E.C. Houston House is a historic two-story house in Tekamah, Nebraska. It was built by Joseph Wixer in 1904-1905 for E. C. Houston, and designed in the Classical Revival style. Since 1985, it has housed the Burt County Museum. It has been listed on the National Register of Historic Places since March 13, 1986.
