= Isaac Newton Clark House =

- U.S. National Register of Historic Places
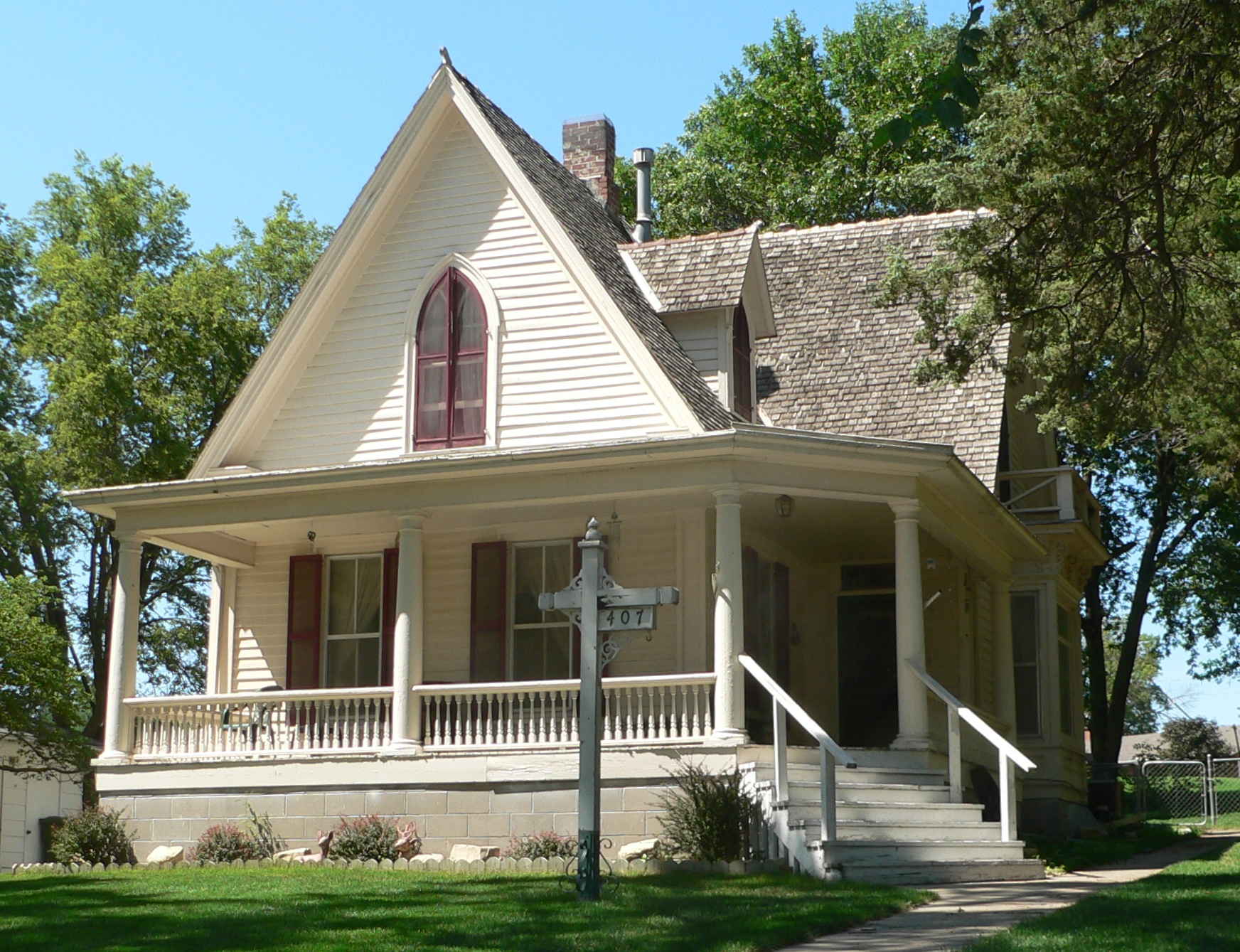
- The house in 2010

- Location within Nebraska Location within the United States
- Location: 468 Cedar Street, Sutton, Nebraska
- Coordinates: 40°36′36″N 97°51′51″W
- Area: less than one acre
- Built: 1877
- Architectural style: Gothic Revival
- NRHP reference No.: 83003985
- Added to NRHP: December 15, 1983

The Isaac Newton Clark House is a historic one-and-a-half-story house in Sutton, Nebraska. It was built in 1877 for Isaac Newton Clark, a teacher-turned-businessman from Ohio who served in the Union Army during the American Civil War in Illinois and eventually co-founded the city of Sutton. The house was designed in the Gothic Revival style, with a Neoclassical porch added in 1916. It has been listed on the National Register of Historic Places since December 15, 1983.
