= Church of the Visitation of the Blessed Virgin Mary (O'Connor, Nebraska) =

Historic church in Nebraska, United States

- U.S. National Register of Historic Places
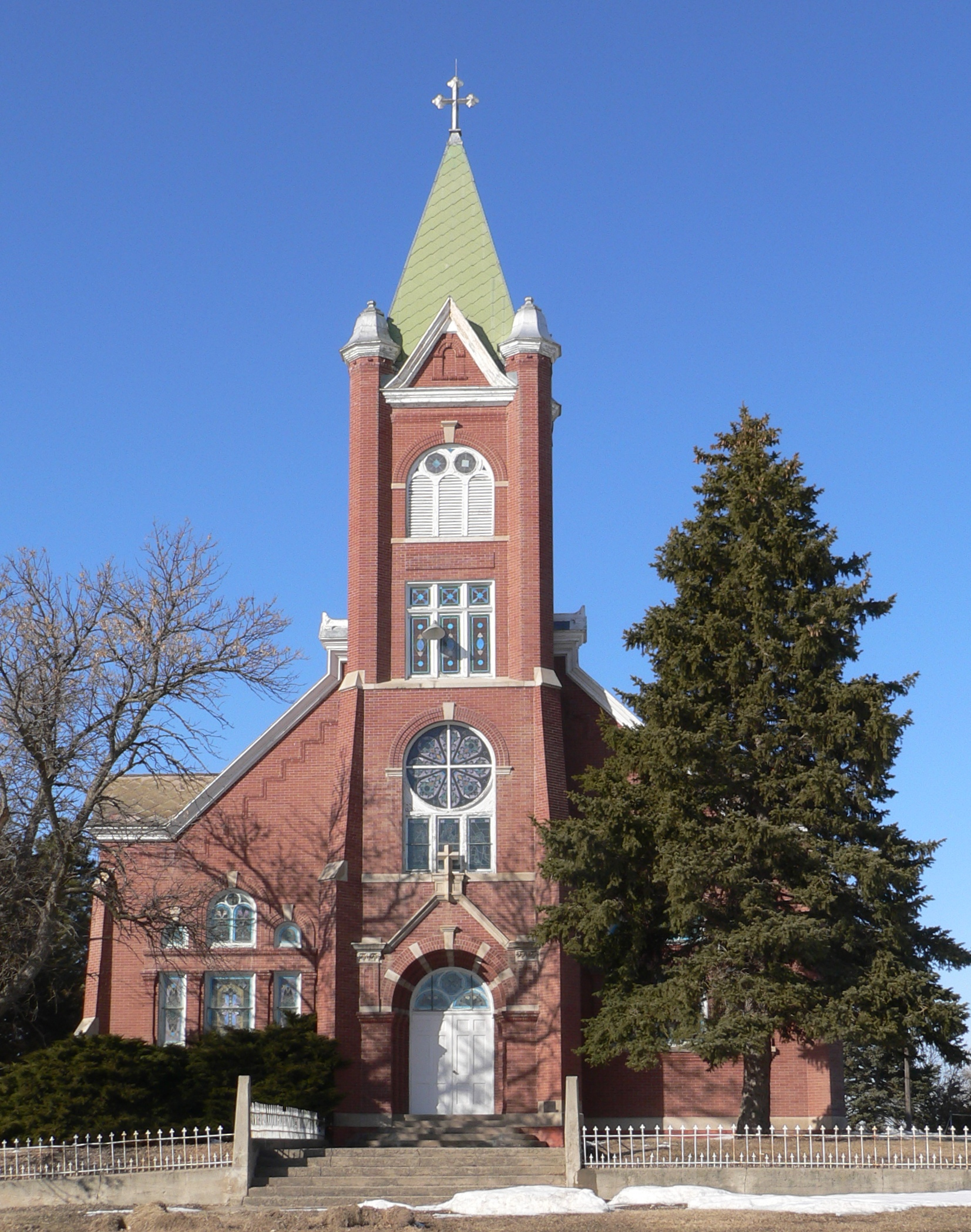

- Location within Nebraska Location within the United States
- Location: Off NE 56, O'Connor, Nebraska
- Coordinates: 41.51084°N 98.47511°W
- Area: 109.7 acres (44.4 ha)
- Built: 1879, 1904-05, 1954-55
- Architect: James H. Craddock
- Architectural style: Romanesque
- NRHP reference No.: 84002472
- Added to NRHP: February 23, 1984

Church of the Visitation of the Blessed Virgin Mary is a church complex off NE 56 in O'Connor, Nebraska. It was added to the National Register of Historic Places in 1984. The listing included three contributing buildings on 109.7 acres (44.4 ha).

It is also known as the O'Connor Church Complex. The main building is the church (1904–05), which is brick and soaring and Romanesque Revival in style. There is also a rectory (1929–30), a plain parish hall (1954–55), a cemetery, and surrounding windbreaks and other land.

The land was purchased in 1879 by the Irish Catholic Colonization Association of the U.S. which was organized in part "to aid the social, economic, and religious conditions of the Irish-American urban poor by assisting their relocation from eastern cities to farms in Minnesota and Nebraska." In total 25,695.9 acres (103.988 km^{2}) in the area was purchased from the Burlington and Missouri Railroad, and townsites of O'Connor and Spalding were opened in 1880.

The church was designed by architect James H. Craddock.

It is located off Nebraska Highway 56.
