= Kiewit Corporation =

American construction company (founded 1884)

Coordinates: 41.265948°N 95.935909°W

- Type: Private
- Industry: Construction, mining, engineering
- Founded: 1884; 142 years ago (Kiewit Brothers)
- Headquarters: 1550 Mike Fahey St., Omaha, Nebraska, U.S.
- Key people: Rick Lanoha (CEO)
- Revenue: US$18.2 billion (2025)
- Net income: ▲US$1,315 million (2025)
- Number of employees: 34,500 (2025)
- Website: www.kiewit.com

Kiewit Corporation is an American construction company based in Omaha, Nebraska, and founded in 1884. It was ranked 247th on the Fortune 500 list in 2025. Privately held, it is one of the largest construction and engineering organizations in North America. It is an employee-owned company.

== History ==
The company was founded in 1884 as Kiewit Brothers Masonry Contractors by Peter and Andrew Kiewit, who were of Dutch descent. Their father, John Kiewit, emigrated from The Hague in 1857, where he learned the trade of brickmaking. John Kiewit established a brickyard in Omaha, Nebraska, where his sons worked and learned the skills for their masonry business. Early projects included the seven-story Lincoln Hotel in Lincoln as stonemasons and the Bekins warehouse as general contractor. It is an employee-owned company.

The original brothers dissolved their partnership in 1904 and the founding Peter Kiewit continued as a sole proprietorship. In 1912, two of his sons, Ralph and George Kiewit, joined their father as partners in the firm. One of their constructions was the Omaha Fire Department Hose Company No. 4 building, erected in 1913. When the founding Peter Kiewit died in 1914, his son Ralph led the company. George and Ralph Kiewit left the company.

The founder's youngest son, Peter Kiewit Jr., joined the firm in 1919. He led the firm from 1924 until his death in 1979. Peter Jr. turned the firm into one of the largest construction companies in the world. He was also very active in the Omaha area, including leadership of the Knights of Ak-Sar-Ben.

In 1931, Peter Kiewit Jr. incorporated the company as Peter Kiewit Sons' Co. The firm began building transportation projects during the Great Depression.

Walter Scott was also a key figure in the growth of Kiewit. Scott was initially hired to work on the tower project at the Nebraska State Capitol and spent the remainder of his career at Kiewit becoming chief engineer.

== Notable projects ==
- Throughout the 1920s the company built several historic buildings around Nebraska including the Livestock Exchange Building (1926), the old Lincoln station (1926), the Nebraska State Capitol Tower (1927), Joslyn Art Museum (1928), and Union Station (Omaha) (1929).

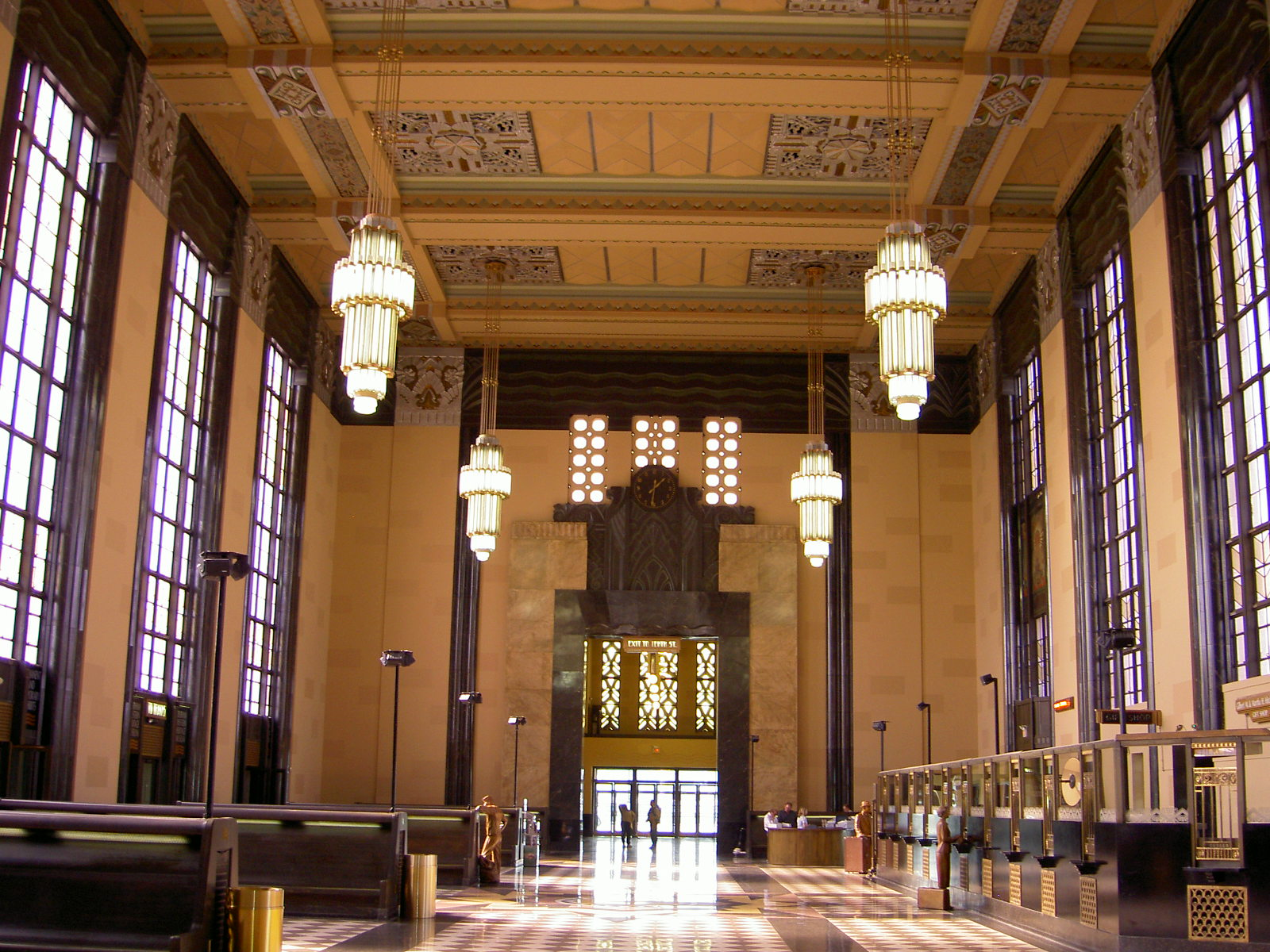
Inside Union Station (Omaha)

- Between 1951 and 1966, Kiewit built Thule Air Base for the U.S. military in Thule, Greenland. Located on the northwest coast of Greenland, the base features a 10,000 foot runway.
- In 1969, Kiewit began constructing the 63rd Street Tunnel between Manhattan and Queens in New York City. The initial project was part of a $2 billion program to expand the New York City Subway and Long Island Rail Road.

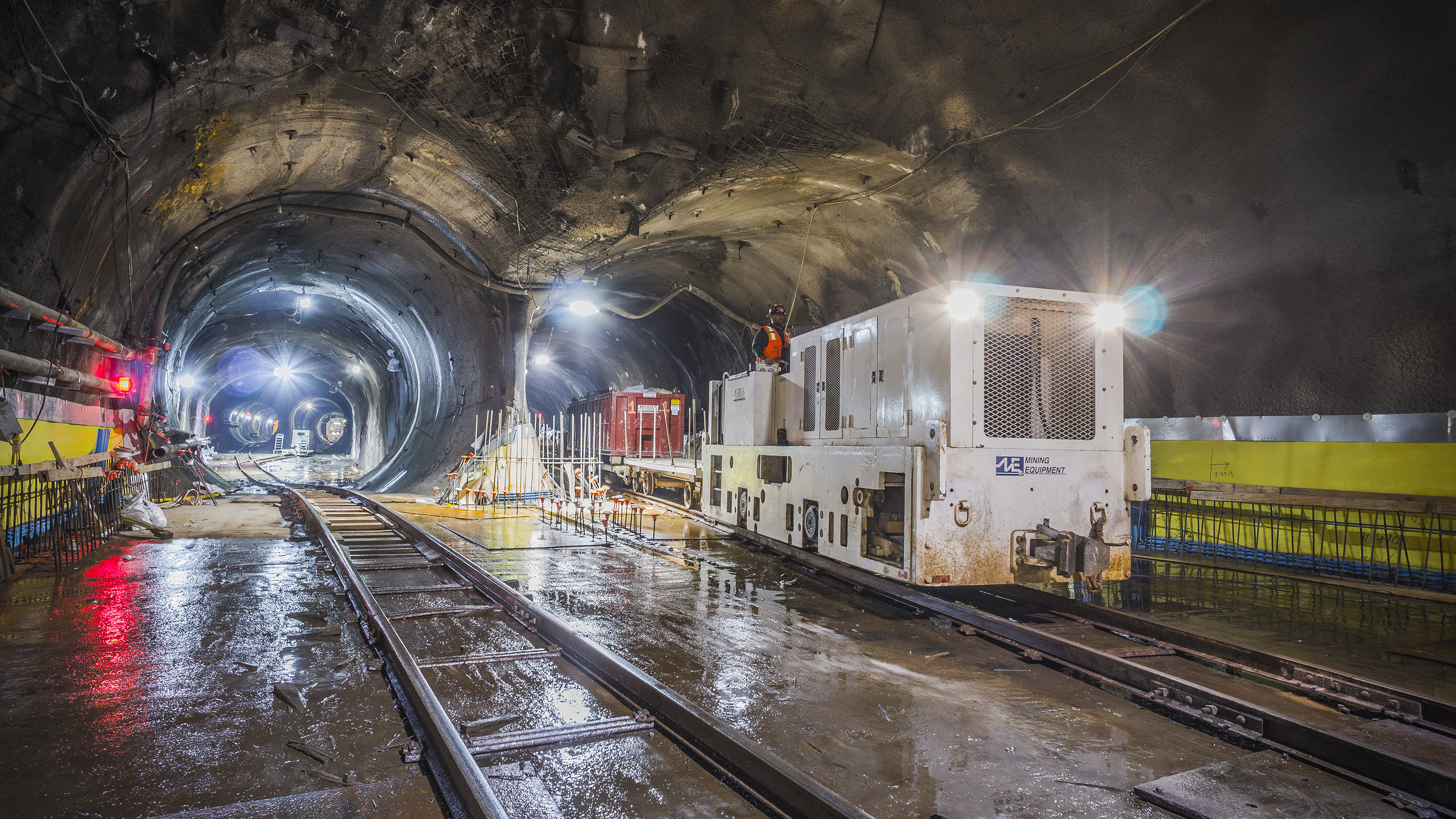
A tunnel cavern for the East Side Access project in New York City

- Between 1980 and 1985, the company built the mile-long $750 million Fort McHenry Tunnel in Baltimore Harbor.
- In the 1990s, Kiewit was part of a joint venture to build the $517 million T-Mobile Park in Seattle, home of the Seattle Mariners baseball team. The project was completed in 1999.
- Ahead of the 2010 Winter Olympics, Kiewit expanded the Sea-to-Sky Highway from Vancouver to Whistler Blackcomb.
- Kiewit Infrastructure South is part of the team constructing the 11.5 mile, six-station Phase II of the Washington Metro's Silver Line in Virginia.
- In September 2024, six months after the Francis Scott Key Bridge collapse, Kiewit won the $73 million contract to design the Francis Scott Key Replacement Bridge. In April 2026, this contract was terminated by Maryland Transportation Authority.

== Leadership ==
Rick Lanoha is the current chief executive officer of Kiewit Corporation. His predecessors include Peter Kiewit, Bob Wilson, Walter Scott Jr., Ken Stinson, and Bruce E. Grewcock. Prior to Grewcock's retirement, on January 1, 2020, Lanoha had served as president and chief operating officer since 2016 and was elected to Kiewit's board of directors in 2009.

Walter Scott, Jr. was first elected to the Peter Kiewit Sons' Incorporated board in 1964. In 1979, he was elected president. When Peter Kiewit died later that same year, Scott was selected to succeed him as chairman.

== Expansions ==
In 1963, Peter Kiewit bought the Omaha World-Herald to keep it locally owned. Under the terms of his will, the employees bought the paper in 1979.

Starting in 1985 (Kiewit built MFS in the early 1990s; Level 3 was built circa 1997 to 1999), Kiewit also constructed a nationwide fiber optic network. This network was later spun off as Level 3 Communications, which became the formal successor corporation to the original Peter Kiewit Sons'.

They have a training facility called Kiewit University in its new Omaha, Nebraska, campus that trains employees from throughout the US.

== Acquired companies ==
- TIC Holdings (The Industrial Company), Steamboat Springs, Colorado (Acquired December 29, 2008)
- Weeks Marine of Cranford, New Jersey (Acquired January 3, 2023)
