= Joseph P. Guth =

American architect

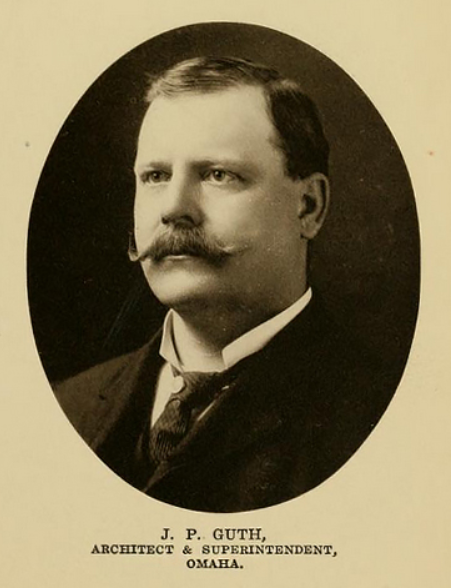
- Guth around 1900
- Born: 24 June 1859; Stuttgart, Kingdom of Württemberg
- Died: 23 April 1928 (aged 68); Omaha, Nebraska, United States
- Citizenship: American
- Occupation: Architect
- Spouse: Bella D. Puls Guth
- Children: Theresa Marie Guth Geisler (1892–1964); Juliabell Dorothy Guth (1894–1964)
- Parent(s): P. J. Guth, Theresa Baumeister Guth

Joseph P. Guth (24 June 1859 – 23 April 1928) was a popular civil engineer, architect and builder in Omaha, Nebraska, starting in the 1880s.

== Biography ==
Guth was born in Stuttgart, Kingdom of Württemberg, and attended schools in the Kingdom of Württemberg and the Kingdom of Bavaria, by then part of the German Empire. His father, J. P. Guth, was a notable architect of government railroad projects in the German Empire in the mid-1800s. Graduating from school in 1879, the younger Guth worked as an architect for two years and decided to emigrate to the United States. Following his father in railroad design, he first worked for the New York, Pennsylvania and Ohio Railroad based in Cleveland, Ohio. Guth soon switched to the Northern Pacific Railroad in Brainerd, Minnesota, and left there to join the Burlington Railroad in Lincoln, Nebraska. He finally landed with the Union Pacific Railroad in Omaha and stayed there until 1887.

He immigrated to the United States in 1884. Originally living in Cleveland, Ohio, Guth partnered with Joseph Dietrick to start an architectural firm; however, by 1891 the partnership had dissolved. Continuing as a sole proprietor, Guth worked business blocks, breweries, factories and warehouses, fire stations, schools, single and multifamily residences, churches and halls in Omaha and across eastern Nebraska. Guth is also credited with designing several industrial brewing buildings for the Storz and Krug breweries in Omaha.

Omaha's prolific apartment designer Henry D. Frankfurt apprenticed under Guth.

Guth practiced architecture until he died in 1928, aged 68, at his 1911 Wirt Street home. He was buried at Forest Lawn Memorial Park in Omaha.

== Notable designs ==
- Prague Hotel (1898) NRHP Omaha
- Eggerss-O'Flyng Building (1902) NRHP Omaha
- St. John's German Evangelical Lutheran Church, (1902) Lyons
- Fepco Building (1903)
- Omaha Casket Company (1905)
- Apartments (1906) 536 S 26th Avenue, Omaha
- Apartments (1906) 554 S 26th Avenue, Omaha
- Schuyler City Hall (1908) NRHP 1020 A Street, Schuyler
- Trimble House (1909)
- Omaha Fire Department Hose Company No. 4 (1913) 999 North 16th Street, Omaha
- St. Luke's Episcopal Church (1913) 2304 2nd Avenue, Kearney
- Druid Hall (1915) 2412 Ames Avenue, Omaha
- Shirby Apartments (1922) 3320 California Street, Omaha
- Single family dwelling (1922) 5116 Nicholas Street, Omaha (Part of the Dundee-Happy Hollow Historic District)
- Single family dwelling (1923) 308 South 52nd Street, Omaha (Part of the Dundee-Happy Hollow Historic District)
- Boulevard Apartments (1923) 606 S 32nd Avenue, Omaha
- Seymour Apartments (1923) 608 S 32nd Avenue, Omaha
- Harriet Court Apartments (1925) 137 N 33rd Street, Omaha
- Augustus B. Slater Residence (1925) local landmark, 1050 South 32nd Street, Omaha

== See also ==
- Thomas Rogers Kimball
- John Latenser, Sr.
- Architecture in Omaha, Nebraska
- Omaha Landmarks
