= Schuyler City Hall =

- U.S. National Register of Historic Places
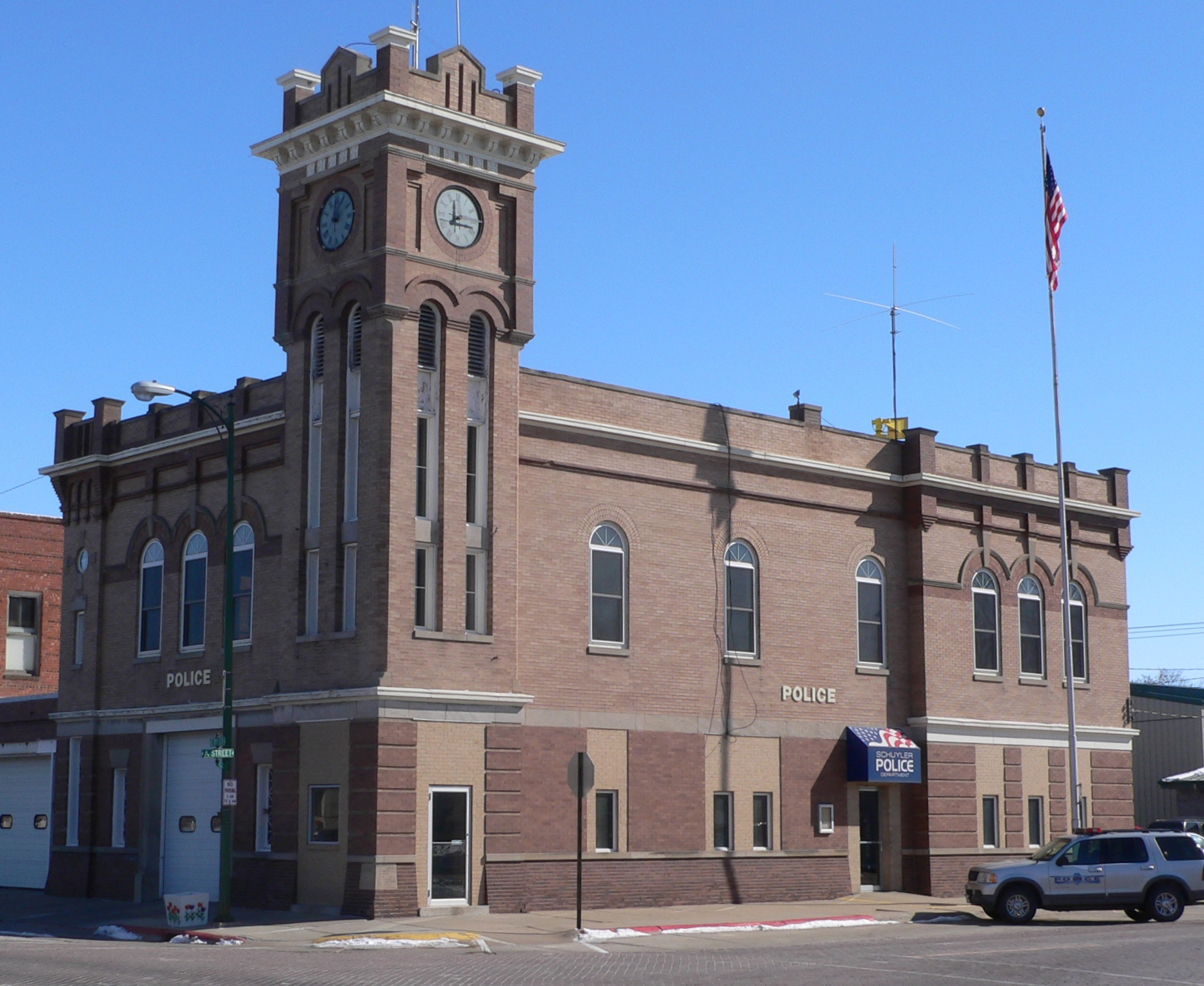
- The building in 2010

- Location within Nebraska Location within the United States
- Location: 1020 A Street, Schuyler, Nebraska
- Coordinates: 41°26′50″N 97°03′29″W
- Area: less than one acre
- Built: 1908
- Architect: Joseph P. Guth
- NRHP reference No.: 81000370
- Added to NRHP: September 3, 1981

The Schuyler City Hall is a historic two-story building with a three-story clock tower in Schuyler, Nebraska. It was built as a city hall in 1908, and designed in the Medieval Italian stye by German-born architect Joseph P. Guth. The Seth Thomas Clock Company clock was added in 1909. The building has been listed on the National Register of Historic Places since September 3, 1981.
