= Omaha Fire Department Hose Company No. 4 =

Historic building in Nebraska, United States

- Interactive map of the Omaha Fire Department Hose Company No. 4 area

General information
- Architectural style: Neoclassical
- Location: Omaha, Nebraska, U.S., 999 North 16th Street
- Coordinates: 41°16′08″N 95°56′12″W
- Completed: 1913 (113 years ago)

Technical details
- Floor count: 2

Design and construction
- Architect: Joseph P. Guth
- Main contractor: Peter Kiewit & Sons

The Omaha Fire Department Hose Company building is located at 999 North 16th Street in Omaha, Nebraska, United States. The former home of Omaha Fire Department's hose company number 4 and designed by German-born architect Joseph P. Guth and built in 1913 by Dutchman Peter Kiewit & Sons, the building is now unoccupied. Charles A. Salter was the chief of the fire department at the time.

In 2011, the Nebraska State Historical Society included the building in its Reconnaissance Survey of Downtown and Columbus Park Omaha, which was prepared for the City of Omaha.

The building has served as the home of horse-drawn fire wagons, a plumbing company, an auto transmission shop, an armored car garage and, its last known use, for storage.

== See also ==
- History of Omaha, Nebraska
