= Saint Martin's Catholic Church =

Historic church in Nebraska, United States

- U.S. National Register of Historic Places
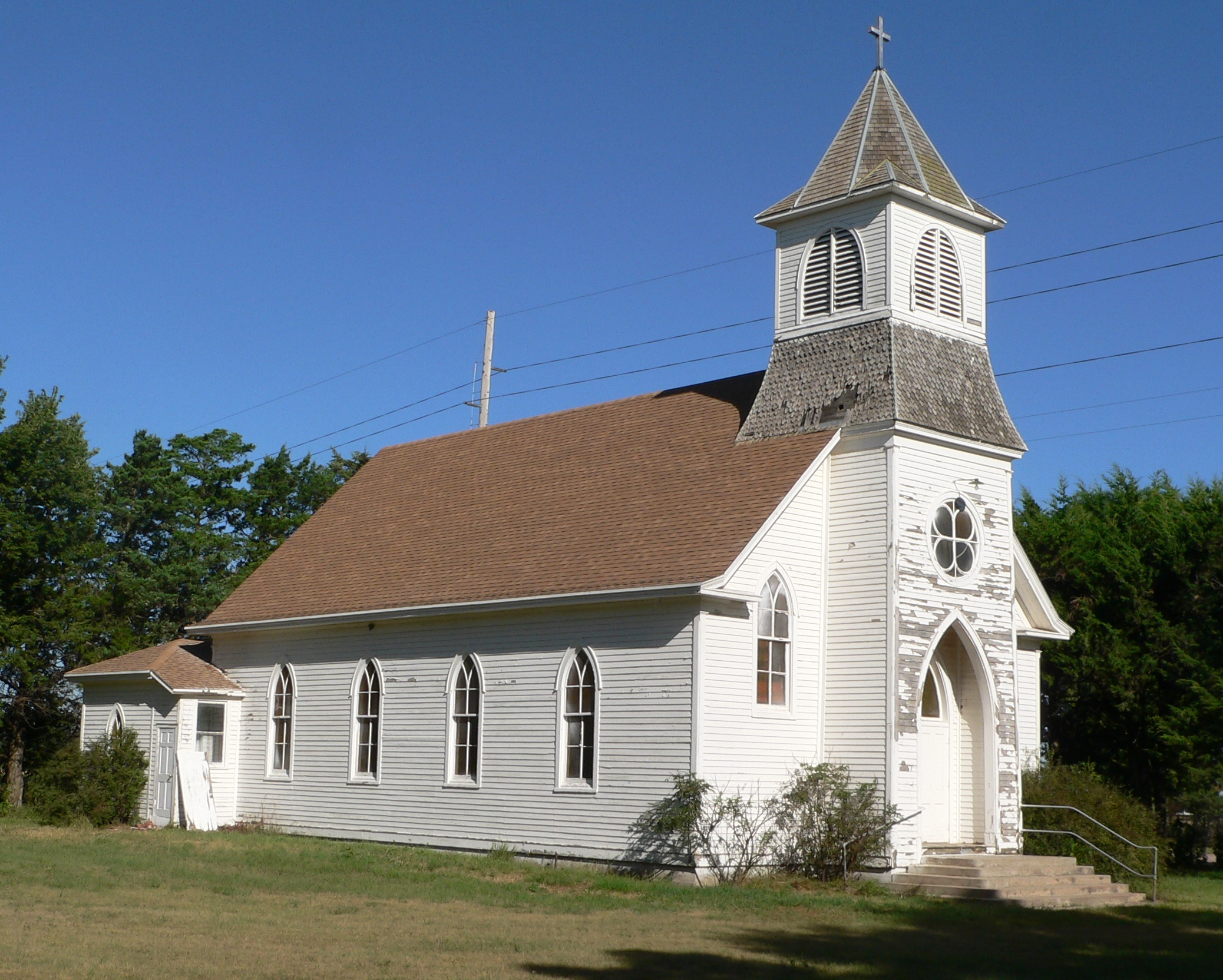

- Location within Nebraska Location within the United States
- Nearest city: Deweese, Nebraska
- Coordinates: 40°21′53″N 98°11′42″W
- Built: 1907
- Built by: King, John E.
- Architect: Craddock, J.H.
- Architectural style: Late Gothic Revival
- NRHP reference No.: 85002574
- Added to NRHP: September 26, 1985

Saint Martin's Catholic Church (also known as Loucky Church) is a Roman Catholic church building near Deweese, Nebraska. The church was built to serve a Czech immigrant congregation.

It was built in 1907–08. It was added to the National Register in 1985.

It is a frame Gothic Revival church on a concrete foundation, and is 32.5 by 48.5 feet (9.9 m × 14.8 m) in plan. It was designed by architect James H. Craddock and built by John E. King for a Czech immigrant congregation.
