= Fairfield Carnegie Library =

- U.S. National Register of Historic Places
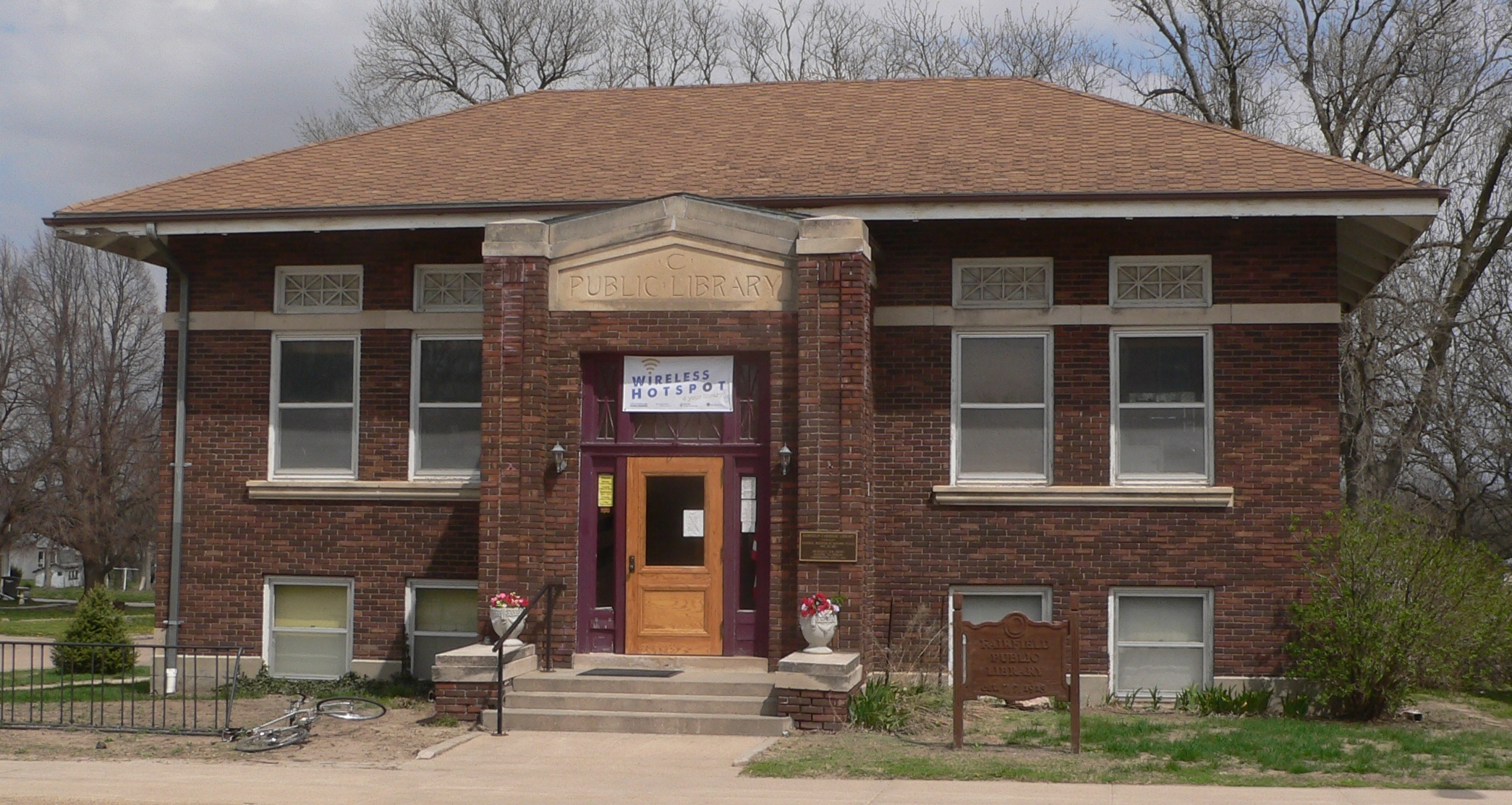
- The library in 2013

- Location within Nebraska Location within the United States
- Location: 412 North D Street, Fairfield, Nebraska
- Coordinates: 40°25′52″N 98°06′17″W
- Area: less than one acre
- Built: 1913
- Built by: T. J. Fowler
- Architect: R. W. Grant
- Architectural style: Prairie vernacular
- MPS: Carnegie Libraries in Nebraska MPS
- NRHP reference No.: 01001274
- Added to NRHP: November 29, 2001

The Fairfield Carnegie Library is a historic building in Fairfield, Nebraska, and a Carnegie library. It was built in 1913 by T. J. Fowler with 6,000 from the Carnegie Corporation of New York. It was designed in Prairie School style by architect R. W. Grant. It has been listed on the National Register of Historic Places since November 29, 2001.
