= Richard W. Grant =

American architect

Richard W. Grant (1862–1939), often known as R. W. Grant, was an architect based in Beatrice, Nebraska. He designed about 70 schools and at least four Carnegie libraries. A number of his works are listed on the National Register of Historic Places (NRHP).

He went to college in Illinois but reported he was self-trained as an architect.

Works include:

- Samuel D. Kilpatrick House (1904–1905), 701 N. 7th, Beatrice, Nebraska, NRHP-listed
- Geneva Carnegie Library (1911–1913), 1043 G, Geneva, Nebraska
- Fairfield Carnegie Library (1913), southwest corner 5th & D, Fairfield, Nebraska, NRHP-listed
- Tekamah Carnegie Library (1914), southwest corner 13th & L, Tekamah, Nebraska, NRHP-listed
- Wymore Carnegie Library (1914–1919), 1021 W B, Wymore
- One or more works in the North Seventh Street Historic District, Beatrice, Nebraska, NRHP-listed

Note: there was a different R.W. Grant, a carpenter, associated with another NRHP-listed work, the Edward M. Gregg Farm, near Jerome, Idaho.
