= Tekamah Carnegie Library =

- U.S. National Register of Historic Places
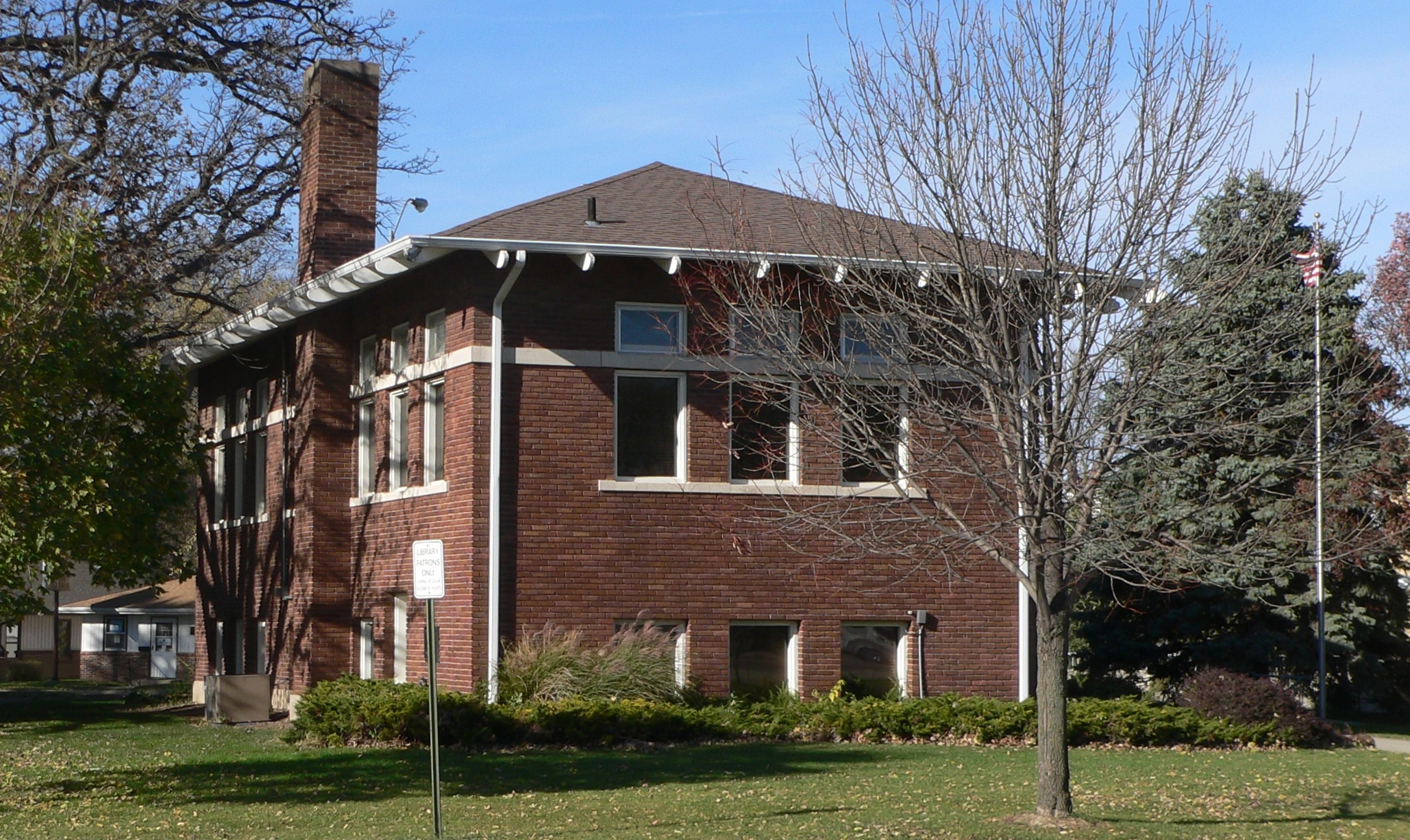
- The library in 2010

- Location within Nebraska Location within the United States
- Location: 204 South 13th Street, Tekamah, Nebraska
- Coordinates: 41°46′37″N 96°13′17″W
- Area: less than one acre
- Built: 1916
- Built by: L.G. Wood
- Architect: R.W. Grant
- Architectural style: Prairie School
- NRHP reference No.: 05000155
- Added to NRHP: March 15, 2005

The Tekamah Carnegie Library is a historic building in Tekamah, Nebraska. It was built as a Carnegie library by L.G. Wood in 1916, and designed in Prairie School style by architect R.W. Grant. It was dedicated on October 25, 1916. It has been listed on the National Register of Historic Places since March 15, 2005.
