= Jacob Volz =

- Born: June 23, 1889; Sutton, Nebraska, US
- Died: July 22, 1965 (aged 76); Portland, Oregon, US
- Burial place: Lincoln Memorial Park, Portland, Oregon
- Military career
- Allegiance: United States of America
- Branch: United States Navy
- Rank: Carpenter's Mate Third Class
- Unit: USS Pampanga
- Conflicts: Philippine–American War
- Awards: Medal of Honor

Jacob Volz (June 23, 1889 – July 22, 1965) was a Carpenter's Mate Third Class in the United States Navy and a Medal of Honor recipient for his role in the Philippine–American War.

He died July 22, 1965, and is buried in Lincoln Memorial Park, Portland, Oregon.

== Medal of Honor citation ==
Rank and organization: Carpenter's Mate Third Class, U.S. Navy. Place and date: Island of Basilan, Philippine Islands, 24 September 1911. Entered service at: Nebraska. Birth: Sutton, Nebr. G.O. No.: 138, 13 December 1911.

Citation:

While attached to the U.S.S. Pampanga, Volz was one of a shore party moving in to capture Mundang, on the island of Basilan, Philippine Islands, on 24 September 1911. Investigating a group of nipa huts close to the trail, the advance scout party was suddenly taken under point-blank fire and rushed by approximately 20 enemy Moros attacking from inside the huts and other concealed positions. Volz responded instantly to calls for help and, finding all members of the scout party writhing on the ground but still fighting, he blazed his rifle into the outlaws with telling effect, destroying several of the Moros and assisting in the rout of the remainder. By his aggressive charging of the enemy under heavy fire and in the face of great odds, Volz contributed materially to the success of the engagement.

== See also ==
- List of Medal of Honor recipients
- List of Philippine–American War Medal of Honor recipients
