= G. William Miller =

American businessman and investment banker (1925–2006)

William Miller
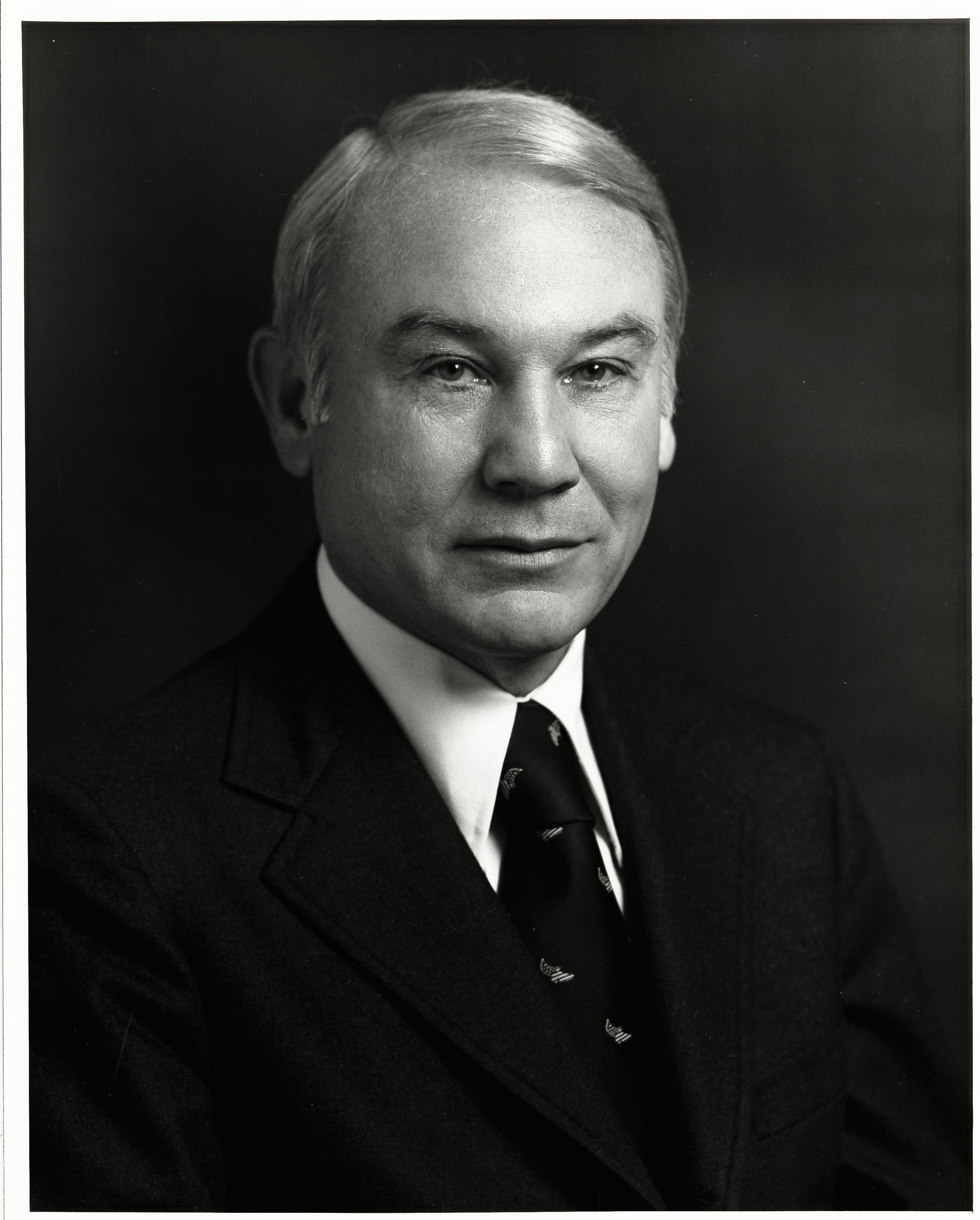

65th United States Secretary of the Treasury
- In office August 6, 1979 – January 20, 1981
- President: Jimmy Carter
- Preceded by: W. Michael Blumenthal
- Succeeded by: Donald Regan

11th Chair of the Federal Reserve
- In office March 8, 1978 – August 6, 1979
- President: Jimmy Carter
- Deputy: Stephen Gardner; Frederick H. Schultz
- Preceded by: Arthur F. Burns
- Succeeded by: Paul Volcker

Member of the Federal Reserve Board of Governors
- In office March 8, 1978 – August 6, 1979
- President: Jimmy Carter
- Preceded by: David Lilly
- Succeeded by: Paul Volcker

Personal details
- Born: George William Miller; March 9, 1925 Sapulpa, Oklahoma, U.S.
- Died: March 17, 2006 (aged 81) Washington, D.C., U.S.
- Party: Democratic
- Spouse: Ariadna Rogojarsky
- Education: Amarillo College (attended); United States Coast Guard Academy (BS); University of California, Berkeley (LLB)

Military service
- Allegiance: United States
- Branch/service: United States Coast Guard
- Years of service: 1945–1949
- Rank: Lieutenant
- Battles/wars: World War II

George William Miller (March 9, 1925 – March 17, 2006) was an American businessman and investment banker who served as the 65th United States secretary of the treasury from 1979 to 1981. A member of the Democratic Party, he also served as the 11th chairman of the Federal Reserve from 1978 to 1979. Miller was the first person to hold both of those posts.

President Jimmy Carter nominated him to succeed Arthur F. Burns as chairman of the Federal Reserve in 1978. Miller came from a corporate world, rather than from economics or finance, an unusual background for a central bank chairman. However, shortly after his appointment, Miller left the Board of Governors to take the position of treasury secretary in the Carter administration, when W. Michael Blumenthal resigned. New York Fed President Paul Volcker was chosen as his successor at the Fed.

== Early life and career ==
George William Miller was born in Sapulpa, Oklahoma, in 1925. His family soon moved to Borger, the largest city in Hutchinson County, Texas, where Miller spent his childhood and picked up the accent he would use into adulthood. The nascent town experienced an oil boom up until the Great Depression, during which it underwent extensive development under the Work Projects Administration. Miller's father, previously a cab driver, became the town's fire chief. After attending Amarillo College for the 1941–1942 school year, he received an appointment to the U.S. Coast Guard Academy, and he graduated from there in 1945 with a B.S. degree in marine engineering. From 1945 to 1949, Miller served as a Coast Guard officer in Asia and on the U.S. West Coast. During his time with the Coast Guard, he met Ariadna Rogojarsky, a Russian emigre; they married in 1946.

After leaving the Coast Guard, Miller enrolled in the Boalt Hall School of Law at the University of California, Berkeley and graduated the top of the class of 1952. From there he joined the law firm of Cravath, Swaine & Moore in New York City.

In 1956, Miller joined the rapidly growing Rhode Island–based conglomerate Textron, Inc as an assistant secretary. He became a vice president of the company in 1957, CFO in 1958, and both the COO and company president in 1960. In the following years, Textron's sales boomed across a range of consumer goods, industrial equipment, and aerospace products. He became Textron's CEO in 1968 and retained that role following his 1974 election as chairman of Textron's board of directors. He held these posts until he joined to the Federal Reserve Board. Despite the economy's weakening state during his time as CEO, Textron's sales grew 65% to $2.8bn as the company operated 180 plants worldwide. This allowed the company's sales and net income to keep pace with the decade's accelerating inflation (albeit with a temporary dip in inflation-adjusted net income during the 1973-75 recession).

In Providence, Miller was active in the Central Congregational Church.

Miller also forayed into politics and public service. From 1963 to 1965, Miller was Chairman of the Industry Advisory Council of the President's Committee on Equal Employment Opportunity. In 1966 and 1967, he was a member of the National Council on the Humanities. Miller also served in the think tank Club of Rome. In 1968, he aided Hubert Humphrey's presidential campaign as chairman of a Democratic-leaning business group. He also played a minor role in Jimmy Carter's 1976 presidential campaign. After Carter's election, Miller chaired the President's Committee on HIRE, which tried to explore the issues surrounding veteran employment.

At the time he joined the Washington-based Federal Reserve Board of Governors in 1978, Miller had been a Class B director of the Federal Reserve Bank of Boston for about eight years (Textron's headquarters is in the Boston Fed's district), and he was on the board of several corporations. He was also a member of the Business Council and the Business Roundtable, and he was Chairman of both the Conference Board and the National Alliance of Businessmen. He also served on two bilateral international economic councils: the US-USSR Trade and Economic Council and the Polish-US Economic Council.

== Federal Reserve Chairman ==
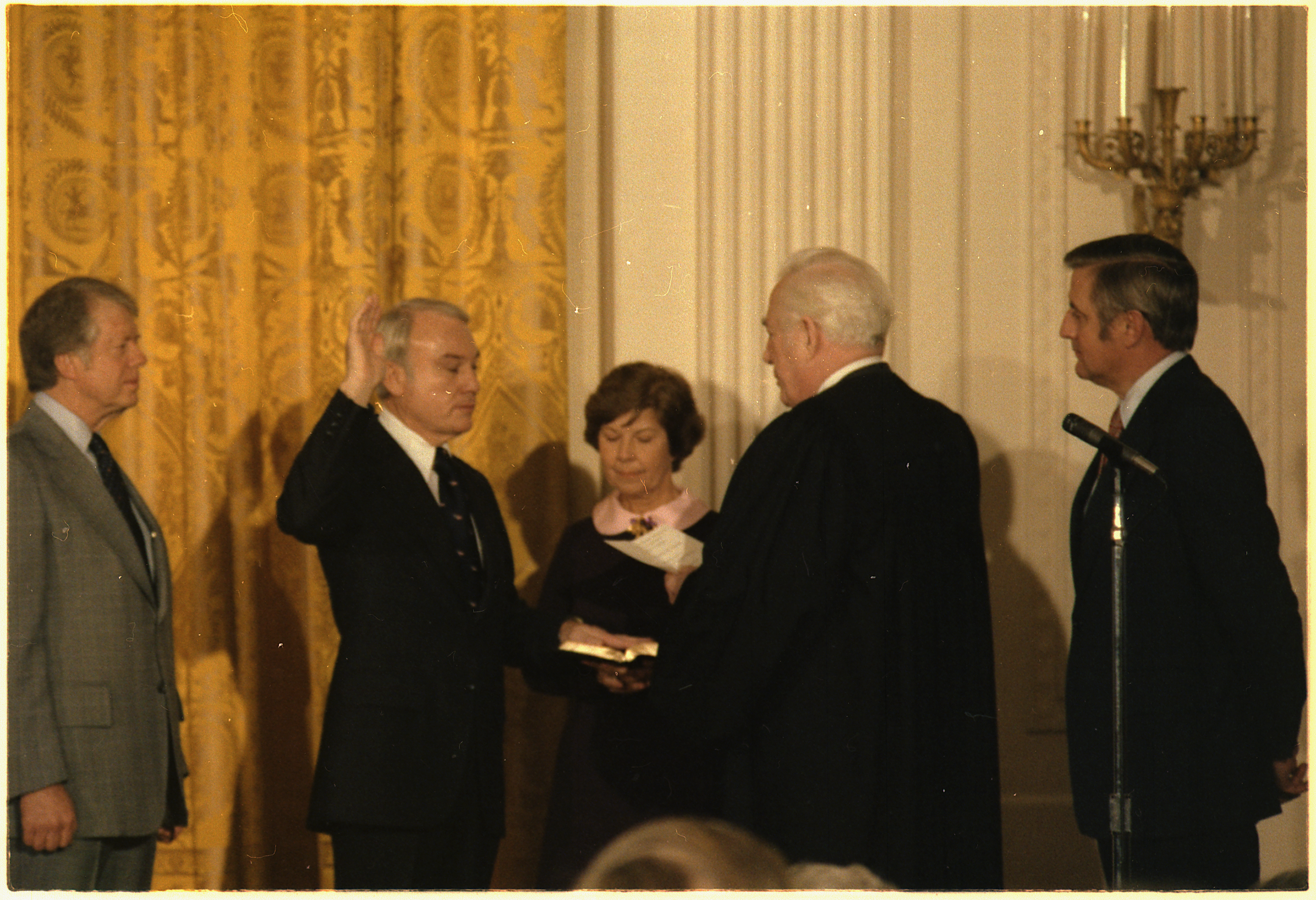
G. William Miller's swearing in ceremony as Federal Reserve Chairman, with Chief Justice Warren E. Burger (right), Vice-President Walter F. Mondale (right), President Jimmy Carter (left), and Ariadna R. Miller (center) in March 1978.

When President Jimmy Carter took office, Nixon-appointee Arthur Burns was the Chairman of the Federal Reserve. President Carter recognized Burns's understanding of the business community, but Burns openly criticized the administration, acted against White House objectives, and (contrary to the administration's goals) prioritized fighting the era's accelerating inflation over unemployment. Consequently, the president asked Vice President Walter Mondale to create a list of candidates to replace Burns when his term as chairman expired. The vice president presented a list of four names. Three (Miller, General Electric's Reginald H. Jones, and DuPont's Irving S. Shapiro) were successful CEOs of large corporations. These men were connected to Washington and the Carter Administration and in their own ways bridged policy and business. Within four days of receiving the short list, President Carter had narrowed it to Miller and the fourth suggestion: Bruce MacLaury, a trained economist with experience at the Treasury under Paul Volcker, at the Brookings Institution, and in different branches of the Federal Reserve System. When President Carter looked for a successor to Miller as Federal Reserve Chairman in 1979, MacLaury was on the short list again (the CEOs Jones and Shapiro were not). As the president decided between Miller and MacLaury in 1978, the people he consulted (including Jones and Shapiro) unanimously favored Miller given his potential to provide leadership while learning technical details on-the-job. When the president spoke with Miller about the position, Miller expressed concern that he lacked the necessary background but agreed to serve in the role if the president wished it.

In anticipation of the end of Burns's term as Fed chairman in March 1978, President Carter announced in December 1977 that Miller was his nominee to replace Burns. The announcement received lukewarm reception as US markets slightly worsened, media coverage expressed uncertainty about the relatively unknown nominee's views, and economists' reactions varied. In this context, Miller sat before the United States Senate Committee on Banking, Housing, and Urban Affairs for the first-ever confirmation hearings for a Federal Reserve chairman. Up until this time, the Senate had questioned and voted on the president's nominees to the Board of Governors while the US president selected the chairman and vice chairman. Some senators were reserved about Miller and challenged his qualifications, and the questions covered a host of issues like Miller's views of the Federal Reserve's independence. Miller voiced support for and belief in the Fed's independence, which (based on Miller's different Senate testimonies) is a position he held before and after his time as the Federal Reserve Chair. Allegations against both Textron and Miller's actions as its leader spurred the committee to investigate the company. Following what one senator called the "most detailed nomination hearings" he had ever seen, Miller was vindicated and unanimously approved by the Senate.

Miller succeeded Arthur Burns as Fed Chairman in March 1978. He inherited a high inflation economy, still suffering from the increase in oil prices from OPEC. The change in the Consumer Price Index was 4.9% in 1976 and 6.7% in 1977. In at least one speech, Miller identified inflation as the nation's primary domestic challenge since (in his view) it was the chief obstacle preventing full employment. Even so, he did not favor aggressive interest rate action that would jeopardize growth. For example, he supported the FOMC's continued policy of placing a tight target range around the federal funds rate that underpins much of the financial system. The modest increases in this target range during Miller's tenure did little to rein in inflation. In contrast, Miller's successor (Paul Volcker) supported more aggressive action (e.g. targeting a growth rate of monetary aggregates instead of a range for the federal funds rate, which allowed for larger and more rapid changes to the federal funds rate). In fact, Miller repeatedly argued during his first year in office that a recession and higher unemployment would accelerate inflation further. Miller also described the economy as being in "great shape" despite the headwinds caused by inflation and other factors.

During Miller's tenure (and arguably in large part due to Miller's preferred policies), the dollar's value decreased substantially. In November 1978, only 11 months into his term, the dollar had fallen nearly 34% against the German mark and almost 42% against the Japanese yen, prompting the Carter administration to launch a "dollar rescue package" including emergency sales from the U.S. gold stock, borrowing from the International Monetary Fund, and auctions of Treasury securities denominated in foreign currencies. This proved only a short-term fix; although temporarily steadying the dollar, it soon resumed its fall. The portmanteau stagflation, the combination of stagnation and inflation, was used increasingly during this time to describe the high rate of inflation, which failed to spur the economy. Even as the situation worsened, Miller insisted that contractionary policies like an overly aggressive interest rate increase would not fight inflation but rather encourage it while hurting the economy's growth.

Miller's restraint in fighting inflation caused distress among members of the Carter Administration itself. Treasury Secretary Blumenthal, Inflation Adviser Alfred Kahn, and Chief Presidential Economist Charles Schultze all advocated for increasing the interest rate prior to the April FOMC 1979 meeting, where Miller opposed such measures. Carter had to admonish his own staff over the press leaks used to carry on the dispute.

Miller's manner of running the Fed did not endear him to his peers or outside observers. Miller was not perceived as having great prestige; not coming from an economics or Wall Street background, he was seen as an "outsider." A 2003 article in The Economist said that "America's central bankers have all made their weight felt across the political sphere, with the possible exception of William Miller, whose brief tenure in 1978-79 was notable for his attempts to ban smoking at the board.". FOMC members who had historically smoked during meetings disregarded Miller's ban. To some extent Miller's outsider status was intentional. Miller tried to "run the Fed as if he were still in charge of a corporation," and he was "much less inclined [than others chairs] to act on his own initiative." It is rare for the influential chair's opinion to not carry the vote at Board of Governors and FOMC meetings, but Miller was outvoted by the Board of Governors at a meeting in 1979 where he opposed an increase in the discount rate, the rate at which the Federal Reserve lends to banks.

Economic historians have generally considered Miller's short tenure unsuccessful. The high inflation that Miller did not rein in required harsh "shock therapy" treatment by his successor, Paul Volcker, to bring inflation under control. That action sent the U.S. economy into recession from 1980 to 1982. Steven Beckner, a Federal Reserve analyst, offered a particularly harsh assessment:

Under Arthur Burns, who chaired the Fed from 1970 to 1978, and under G. William Miller, who was chairman from January 1978 to August 1979, the Fed provided the monetary fuel for an inflation that began as a flicker and grew into a fearsome blaze... If Nixon appointee Burns lit the fire, Miller poured gasoline on it during the administration of President Jimmy Carter. Without question the most partisan and least respected chairman in the Fed's history, this former Textron executive worked in tandem with fellow Carter appointee, Treasury Secretary W. Michael Blumenthal, in pursuit of monetary policies that were expansionist domestically and devaluationist internationally. The goals were to spur employment and exports, with little thought to the dollar's value. By early 1980, inflation was running at 14 percent per year.

— Steven Beckner, Back from the Brink: The Greenspan Years

== Treasury Secretary ==
Miller's signature, as used on American currency

Miller was Fed chairman for just over a year when Carter appointed him Secretary of the Treasury in August 1979, replacing Michael Blumenthal as part of a major cabinet shuffle in which five Cabinet members were replaced. Carter appointed Paul Volcker to replace Miller. He thus became the first person in history to serve as both Treasury Secretary and Chairman of the Federal Reserve. As Treasury Secretary, Miller is best known for his role on the Chrysler Loan Guarantee Board, which oversaw management of a $1.5 billion loan to rescue the carmaker from bankruptcy. This attracted some controversy as the bailout was thought to reward mismanagement and impede fair trade relations between the United States and Japan. Miller agreed that "The administration does not favor, as a general proposition, government aid to private corporations," but thought an exception should be made in Chrysler's case. Chrysler recovered in the early 1980s and paid off the loan early.

Miller is also known for managing the freezing and partial unfreezing of $12 billion in Iranian funds held in the United States during the Iranian hostage crisis. He also pushed through an accord with labor unions on wage-price guidelines that had been "stalemated for months."

Miller's economic policies failed to contain inflation and had little impact on rising unemployment rates. The poor state of the economy was a major factor in Carter's 1980 defeat to Ronald Reagan.

== Later years ==
After Carter's administration ended, Miller founded G. William Miller & Co., a Washington private investment company that he likened to a discreet, Swiss-style merchant bank. He also served positions on a number of charitable and nonprofit organizations. These included treasurer of the American Red Cross, a trustee and director of the Washington Opera, and chairman of the Washington-based H. John Heinz III Center for Science, Economics and the Environment. He also was chairman and chief executive of Federated Stores Inc. (now Macy's, Inc.) from 1990 to 1992.

George William Miller died on March 17, 2006, from idiopathic pulmonary fibrosis, a lung condition, at the age of 81.

Government offices
Preceded by David Lilly	Member of the Federal Reserve Board of Governors; 1978–1979	Succeeded by Paul Volcker
Preceded by Arthur F. Burns	Chairman of the Federal Reserve; 1978–1979	Succeeded by Paul Volcker
Political offices
Preceded by Michael Blumenthal	United States Secretary of the Treasury; 1979–1981	Succeeded by Don Regan
