= Samuel D. Kilpatrick House =

- U.S. National Register of Historic Places
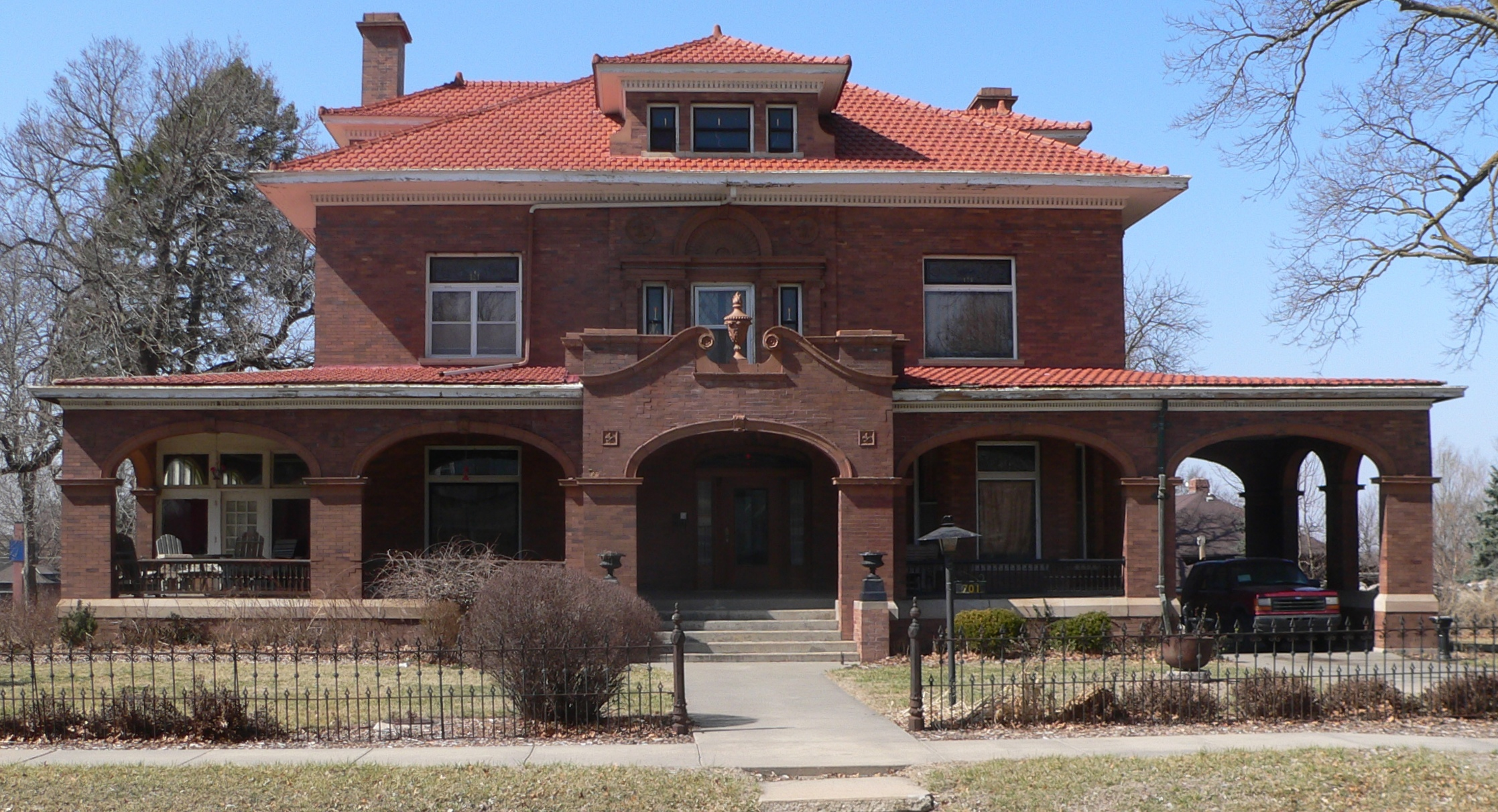
- The house in 2012

- Location within Nebraska Location within the United States
- Location: 701 North 7th Street, Beatrice, Nebraska
- Coordinates: 40°16′22″N 96°44′43″W
- Area: less than one acre
- Built: 1904
- Architect: Richard W. Grant
- Architectural style: Renaissance Revival
- NRHP reference No.: 84000476
- Added to NRHP: December 20, 1984

The Samuel D. Kilpatrick House is a historic house in Beatrice, Nebraska. It was built in 1904–05 for Samuel Davenport Kilpatrick, who lived here with his wife, née Mary Bradt, and their adopted daughter. Kilpatrick was a railroad contractor. With his brothers, he was also a landowner in Nebraska, Kansas, South Dakota, Idaho, Oregon and Texas. The house was designed in the Renaissance Revival style by architect Richard W. Grant. It has been listed on the National Register of Historic Places since December 20, 1984.
