= Robert C. Holland =

American economist and government official (1925–2013)

Robert Holland
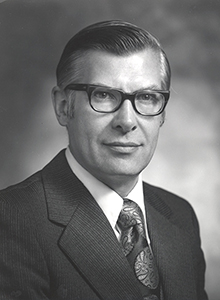

Member of the Federal Reserve Board of Governors
- In office June 11, 1973 – May 15, 1976
- President: Richard Nixon; Gerald Ford
- Preceded by: James Robertson
- Succeeded by: David Lilly

Personal details
- Born: Robert Carl Holland; April 7, 1925 Tekamah, Nebraska, U.S.
- Died: January 3, 2013 (aged 87) Centreville, Virginia, U.S.
- Party: Republican
- Education: University of Pennsylvania (BA, MA, PhD)

Robert Carl Holland (April 7, 1925 – January 3, 2013) was an American economist who served as a member of the Federal Reserve Board of Governors from 1973 to 1976.

== Early life ==
Born in Tekamah, Nebraska, Holland served in the United States Army during World War II. He received his bachelors, masters, and doctorate degrees from the University of Pennsylvania. He died from dementia in Centreville, Virginia.

== Career ==
In 1973, he was appointed to the Federal Reserve Board of Governors by President Richard Nixon. At the Federal Reserve, he made the following statement about credit subsidies:

Our economy, and the financial system that is such an important part of it, rely primarily upon the operation of reasonably free and competitive markets. Such markets work to reward participants who are the most productive, efficient, and responsive to buyer demands. The results are impressive, but they are not perfect. Sometimes they offend either our sense of justice or our humanitarian impulses. At times, a new steel mill can be financed when a family home cannot; or a racetrack can be paid for when a needed hospital cannot. Over the decades, we have valued the workings of our financial markets too much to supersede them, but we certainly have tinkered with them a great deal. Reading our history, we could call small-scale interference with market processes almost as American as apple pie.

== Notes ==
Government offices
Preceded by James Robertson	Member of the Federal Reserve Board of Governors; 1973–1976	Succeeded by David Lilly
