= David M. Lilly (central banker) =

U.S. central banker (1976 – 1978)

Member of the Federal Reserve Board of Governors
- In office 1976–1986
- President: Gerald Ford; Jimmy Carter
- Preceded by: Robert C. Holland
- Succeeded by: George William Miller

Personal details
- Born: June 14, 1917 St. Paul, Minnesota
- Died: February 12, 2014 (aged 96)
- Education: Dartmouth College; Bachelor's degree in economics

David M. Lilly or David Maher Lilly (1917–2014) was chairman of the Toro Company, the former chairman of the Federal Reserve Bank of Minneapolis, former director of both First Bank System and the First National Bank of St. Paul, member of the Federal Reserve Board of Governors, and dean of the University of Minnesota School of Management.

== Early life and career ==
Lilly was born in Saint Paul, Minnesota in 1917 and would later earn a bachelor's degree in economics from Dartmouth College in 1939. After graduating from Dartmouth, he worked in investment banking from 1940 to 1941.

== Career ==
After working in investment banking, he became assistant to the undersecretary of the U.S. Treasury from 1941 to 1942. After serving in the U.S. Army during World War II (1942–1945), he started at The Toro Company (Note: The Toro Company is a lawn maintenance machinery manufacturer based in Minnesota.) in 1945 as vice president and general manager. He was later elected to the board of directors. In 1950, he became the company's president. Starting in 1968 and until his appointment to the Board of Governors, he was chairman of the corporation. In 1976, he was appointed by President Gerald Ford to the Board of Governors. In that same year, Lilly held the following positions:

- Chairman of the board of trustees of Carleton College.
- Member of the Visiting Committee to the Graduate School of Education at Harvard University.
- Member of the Council of the Alumni of Dartmouth College.

Lilly was the successor to Robert C. Holland, who had resigned from the position. Lilly served the two years of the term for the position that had been originally held by Holland. As a member of the Board of Governors, he had described inflation as "a disease that could change the entire fabric of our life unless it is brought under control." He had the shape of the table in the room where the Federal Open Market Committee meets changed from rectangular to oval. He had described it as the new shape of the table as creating "a group dynamic."

After serving a member of the Board of Governors, Lilly was dean of the University of Minnesota School of Management (presently the Carlson School of Management) from 1978 to 1983. From 1983 to 1988, he was the university's vice president for finance and operations.
