= St. John's German Evangelical Lutheran Church =

Historic church in Nebraska, United States

- U.S. National Register of Historic Places
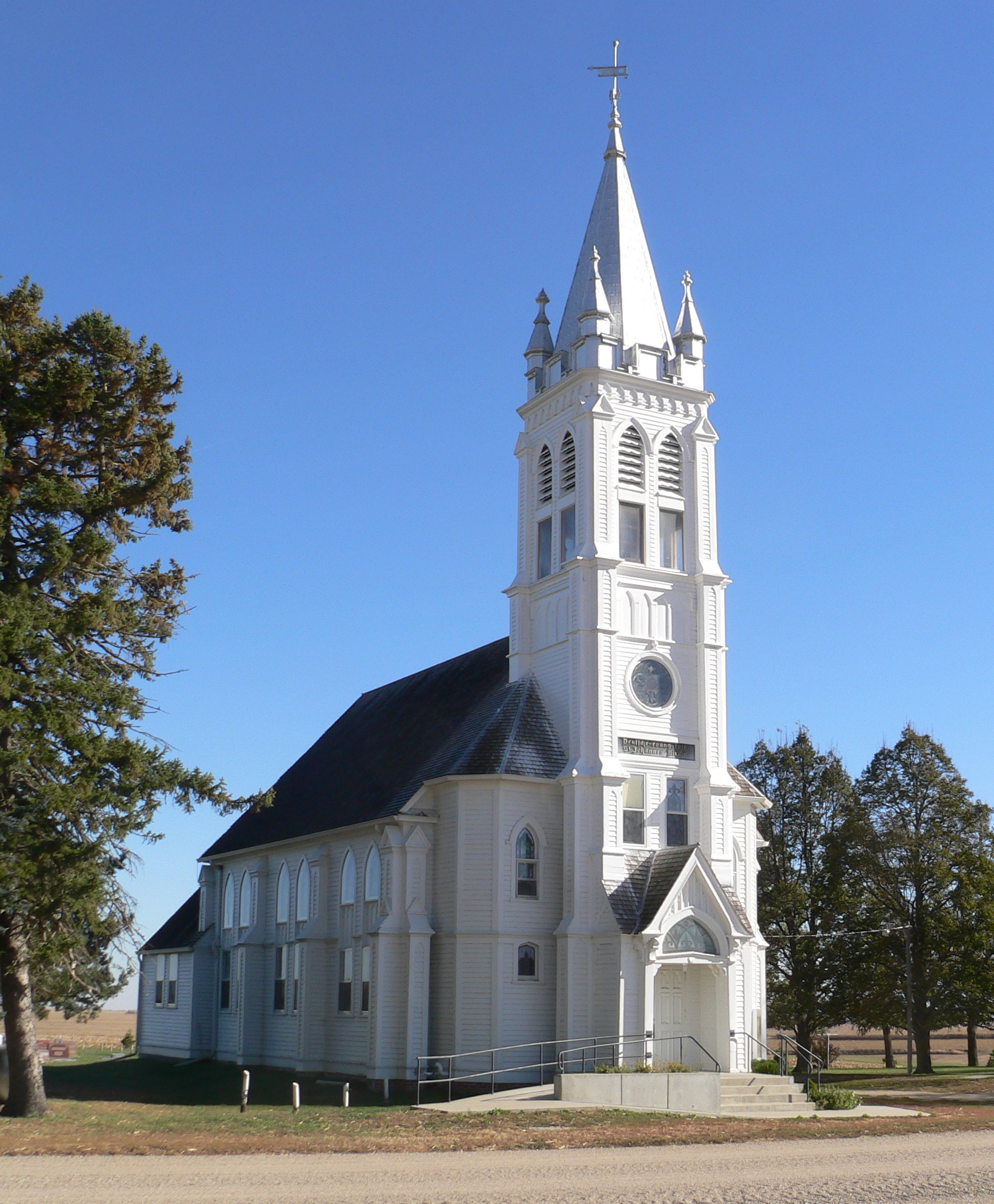

- Location within Nebraska Location within the United States
- Nearest city: Lyons, Nebraska
- Coordinates: 41.89364°N 96.44406°W
- Area: 40 acres (16 ha)
- Built: 1902
- Architect: Guth, J.P.
- Architectural style: Colonial Revival, Gothic Revival, vernacular Georgian Revival
- NRHP reference No.: 82003183
- Added to NRHP: August 2, 1982

The St. John's German Evangelical Lutheran Church, near Lyons, Nebraska, United States, was built in 1902. Also known as Deutsche Ev. Luth. St. Johannes Kirche, it was listed on the National Register of Historic Places in 1982. The listing included two contributing buildings and a contributing site. The location of the site is not disclosed by the National Register. The building has been termed "an excellent example of a German folk version of the Gothic Revival style" and described as "one of the finest and least altered frame churches in Nebraska."

== History ==
The congregation of Saint John German Evangelical Lutheran Church (German: Deutsche Evangelisch-Lutherische Sankt Johannes Kirche) was organized by German immigrants of the Evangelical Lutheran faith on 6 October 1873 in the home of Henry Rewinkel, with Aldolph W. Frese being its first priest. The church, since 1880, has been a part of the Lutheran Church – Missouri Synod, a confessional denomination of Evangelical Lutheranism. Rewinkel donated 40 acres of land for the construction of the church building.

St. John's Evangelical Lutheran Church was erected in 1891, costing a total of $4000 USD. Its bell tower extended 70 feet. The church was built in Gothic Revival architecture.

A fire caused damage to the church in 1901 and on 2 November 1902, Saint John's Evangelical Lutheran Church was rededicated. Its new tower was 90 feet tall.

== Gallery ==
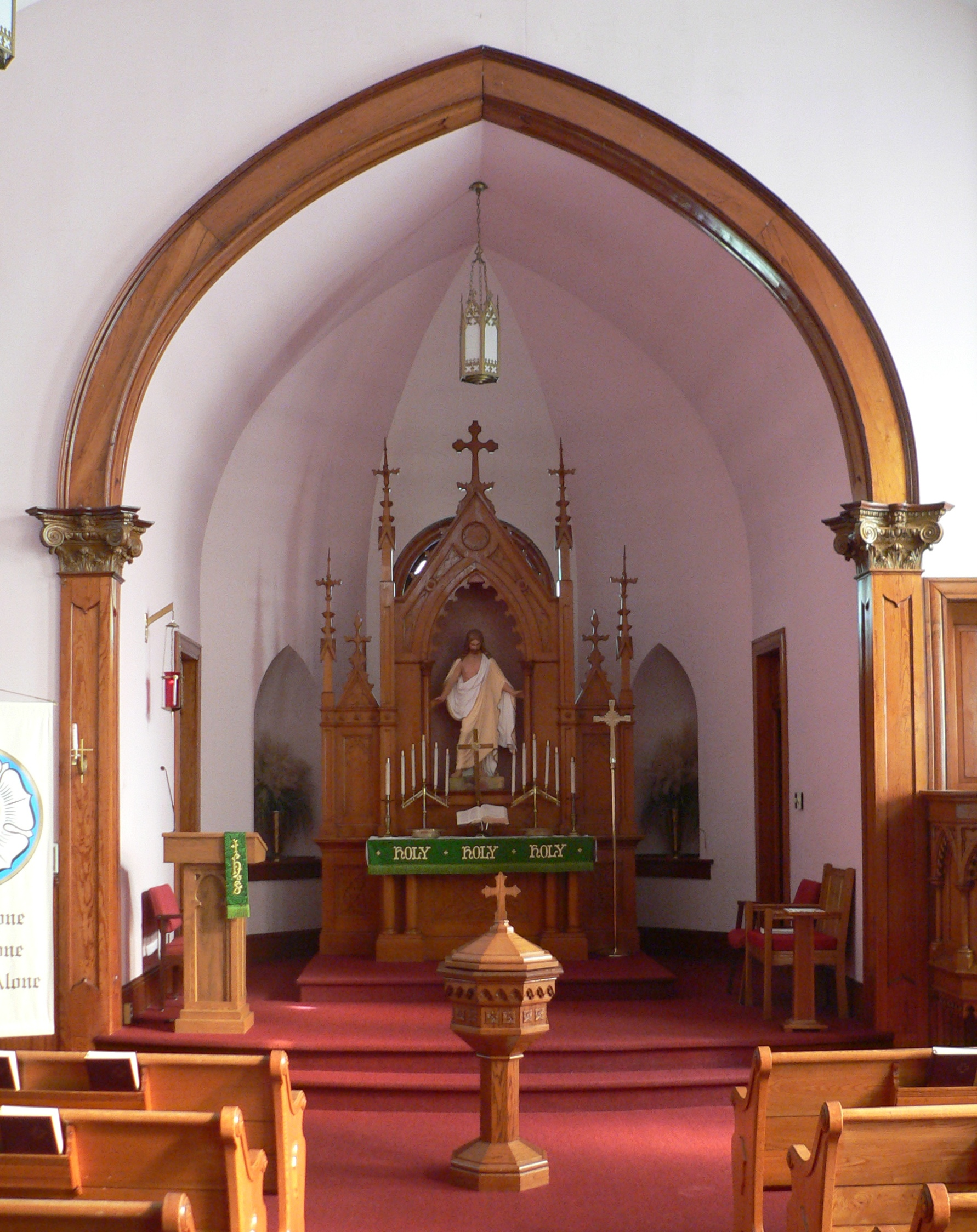
Chancel of St. John's Evangelical Lutheran Church

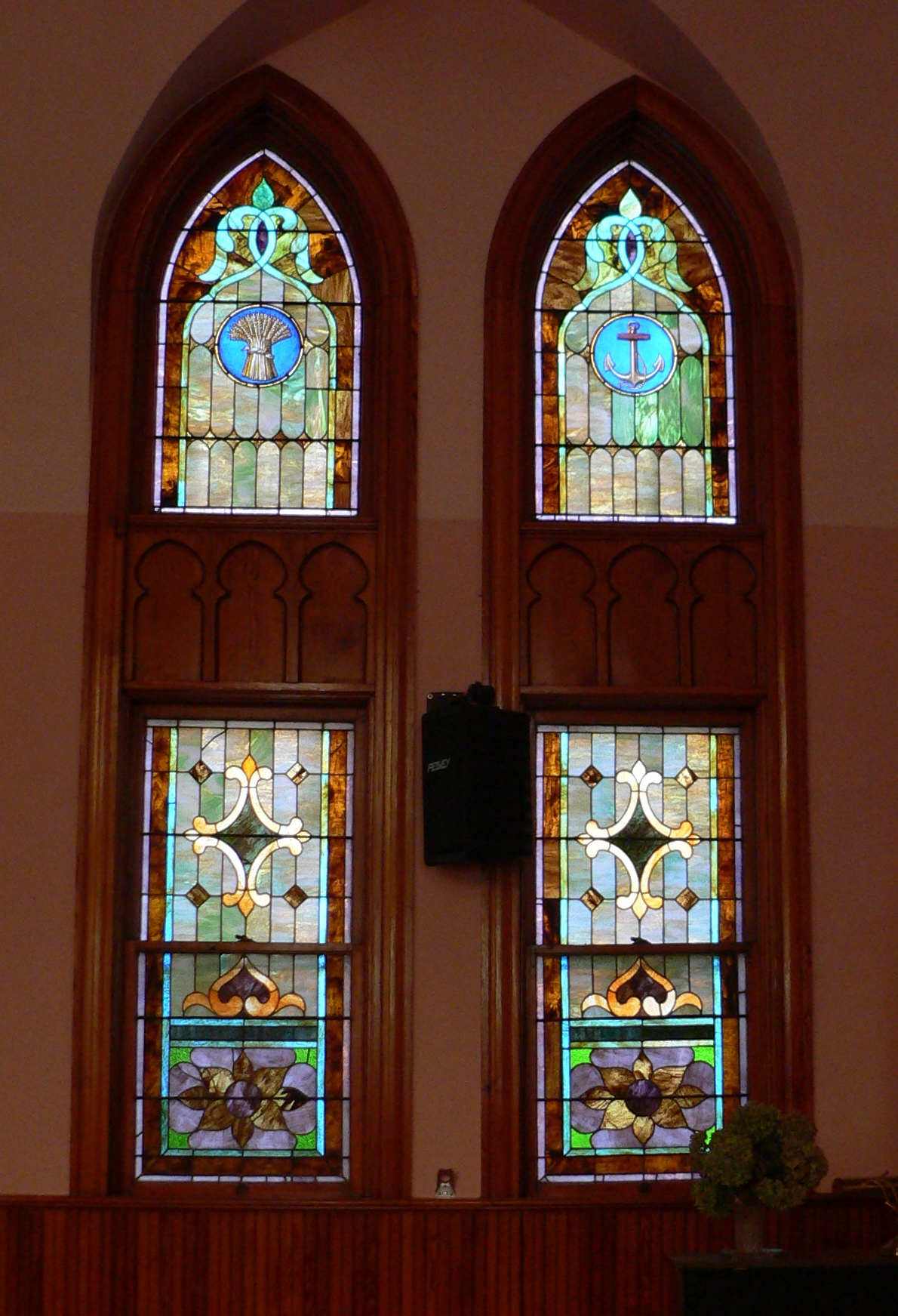
Stained glass in St. John's Evangelical Lutheran Church

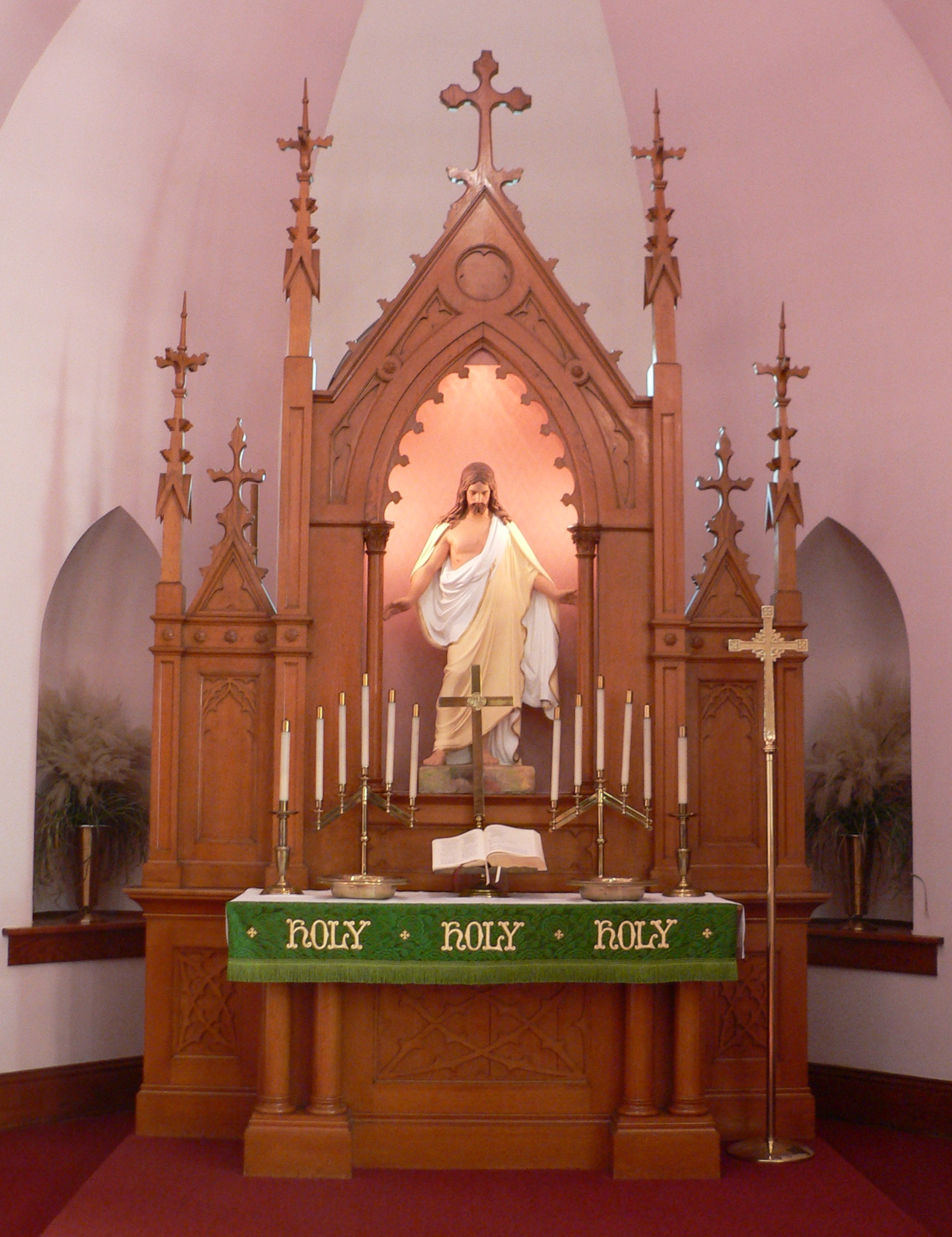
High altar of St. John's Evangelical Lutheran Church

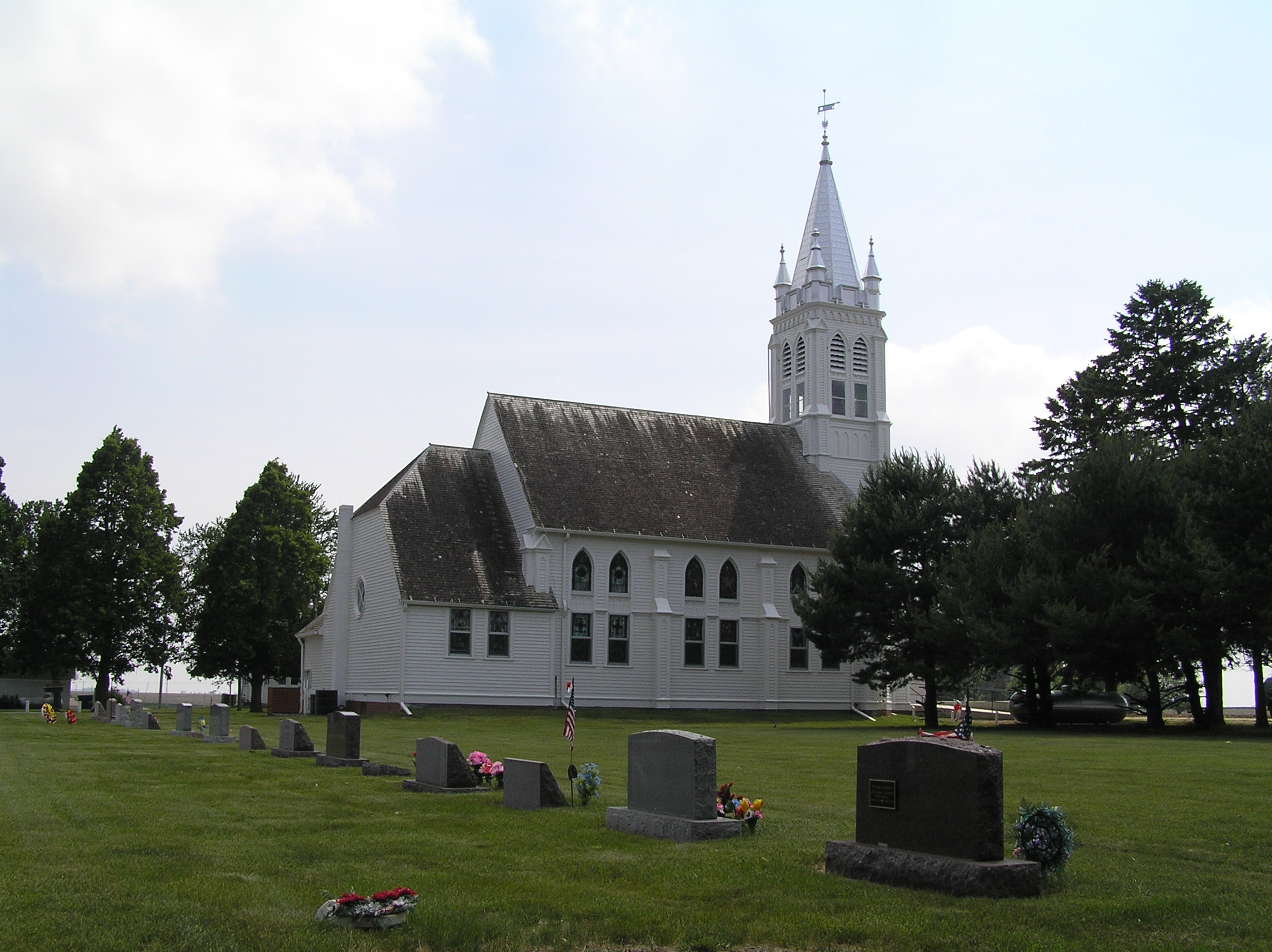
Churchyard of St. John's Evangelical Lutheran Church
