= Tekamah Auditorium =

- U.S. National Register of Historic Places
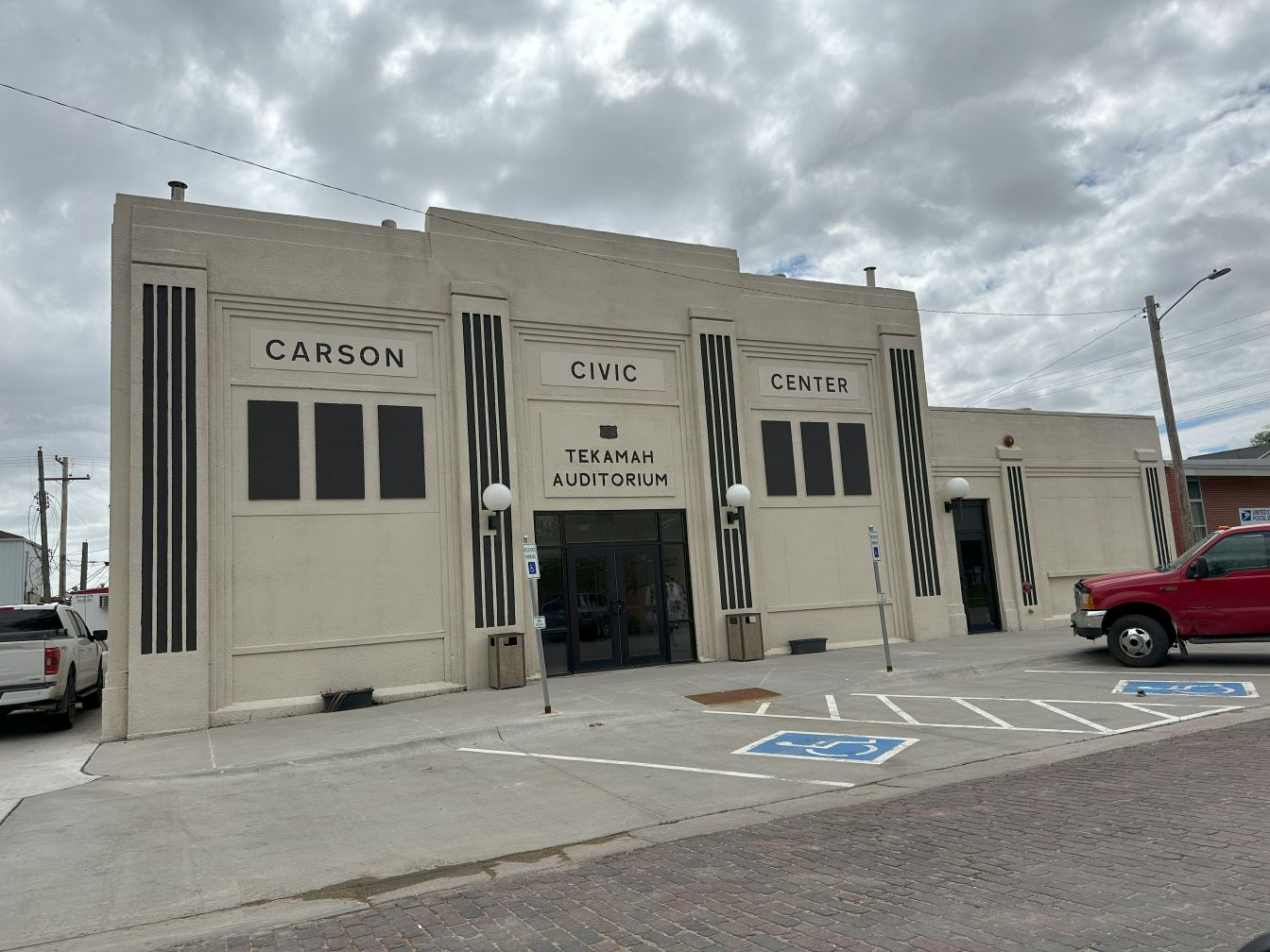
- Tekamah Auditorium in 2025

- Location within Nebraska Location within the United States
- Location: 1315 K St. Tekamah, Nebraska
- Coordinates: 41°46′34″N 96°13′19″W
- Built: 1936-38; 1950
- NRHP reference No.: 100002164
- Added to NRHP: March 5, 2018

The Tekamah Auditorium in Tekamah, Nebraska, was listed on the National Register of Historic Places in 2018.

It was built with New Deal program funding during 1936–38.
