= James H. Craddock =

American architect

James Henry Craddock
- Born: 1856; Mystic, New London County, Connecticut, USA
- Died: March 16, 1932 (aged 75–76); Omaha, Douglas County, Nebraska, USA
- Occupation: Architect
- Political party: Populist; Democratic

James Henry Craddock (1856 – March 16, 1932) was an American architect who designed many buildings in Nebraska, including many public schools and 35 churches, including Church of the Visitation of the Blessed Virgin Mary in O'Connor, Nebraska, which is listed on the National Register of Historic Places.

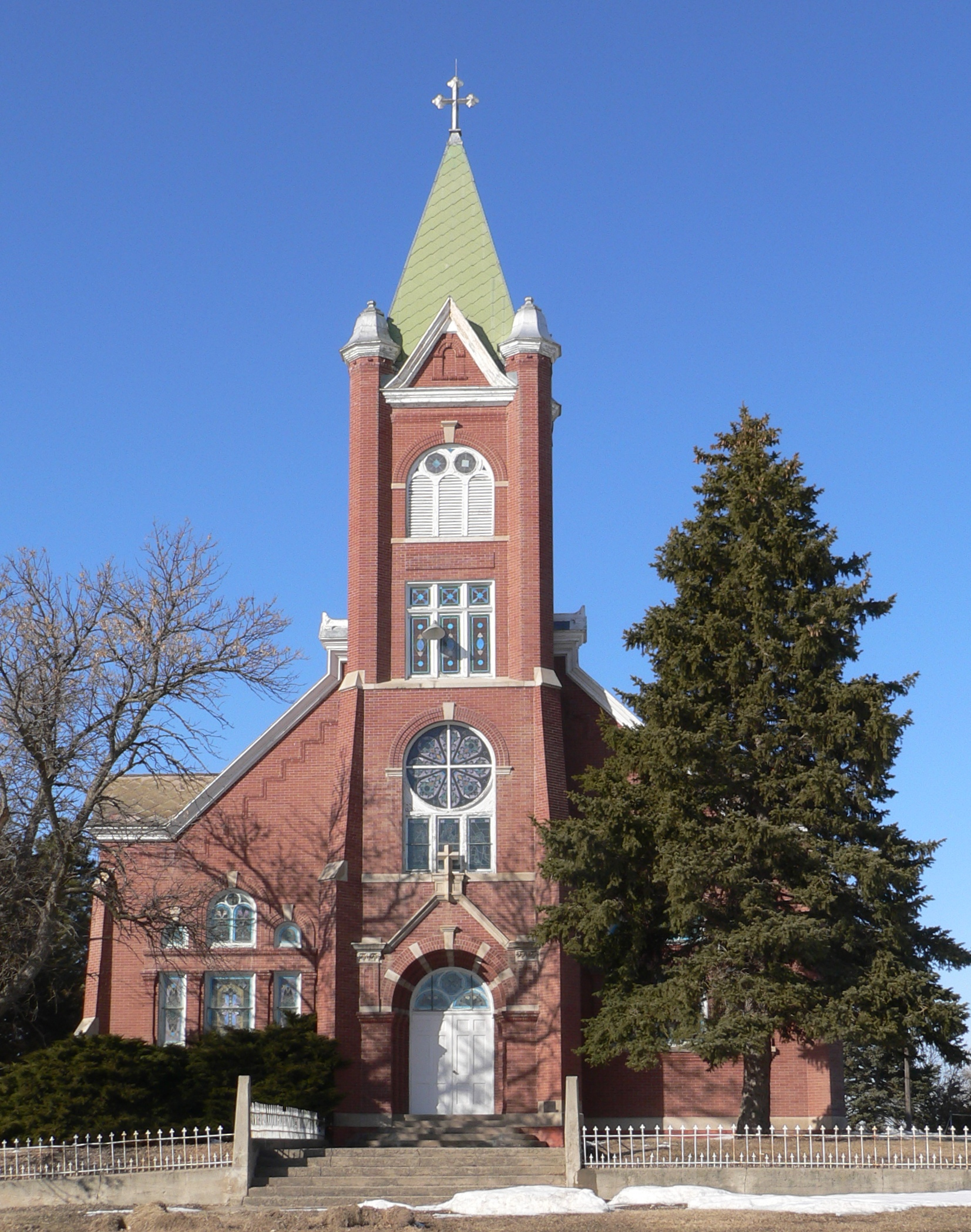
The Church of the Visitation of the Blessed Virgin Mary in O'Connor, Nebraska, designed by Craddock.

Craddock was born in 1856 in Mystic, Connecticut, to an Irish immigrant father who settled in the United States in 1848. The younger Craddock was educated in local schools, and later attended the Mystic River Institute. Craddock relocated to Lincoln, Nebraska, in 1885, and began his architectural practice there. He soon expanded to Omaha, Nebraska, and closed his Lincoln office in 1907. Craddock continued working in Omaha until his death on March 16, 1932.

Craddock was a Catholic and affiliated with the Populist Party and the Democratic Party. He was elected to the Nebraska House of Representatives in 1917.
