= O'Connor, Nebraska =

Unincorporated community in Nebraska, U.S.

Coordinates: 41°30′38″N 98°28′26″W

O'Connor is an unincorporated community in Greeley County, Nebraska, in the United States.

== History ==
O'Connor was founded in 1877 by a colony of Irish Catholics. It was named for Bishop James O'Connor, a member of the Catholic Colonization Association.

O'Connor was once candidate for county seat.

A post office in O'Connor operated from 1880 until 1904.

As of 2014, O'Connor consists solely of a Catholic church and its attendant parsonage. Nearby are occasional farm houses.

The Church was recently permanently closed and is no longer available to enter unless permission is expressly given by the parish and someone unlocks the barricades.
