= Sutton, Nebraska =

- City
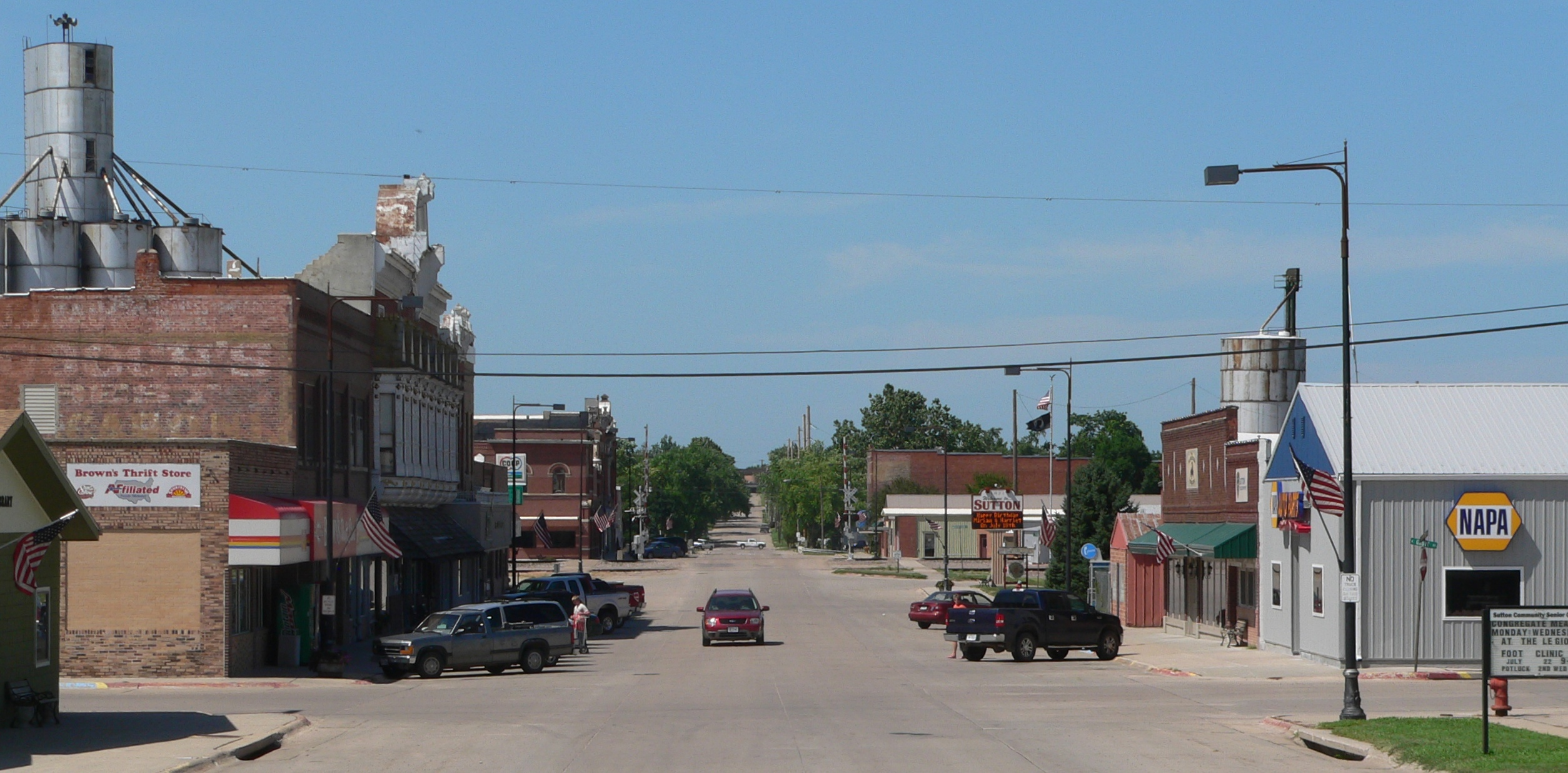
- Downtown Sutton: Saunders Avenue, looking north

- Location of Sutton, Nebraska
- Coordinates: 40°36′26″N 97°51′32″W
- Country: United States
- State: Nebraska
- County: Clay

Area
  - Total: 1.75 sq mi (4.52 km^{2})
  - Land: 1.74 sq mi (4.51 km^{2})
  - Water: 0.0039 sq mi (0.01 km^{2})
- Elevation: 1,677 ft (511 m)

Population (2020)
  - Total: 1,447
  - Density: 831.0/sq mi (320.87/km^{2})
- Time zone: UTC-6 (Central (CST))
  - Summer (DST): UTC-5 (CDT)
- ZIP code: 68979
- Area code: 402
- FIPS code: 31-47955
- GNIS feature ID: 838277

Sutton is a city in Clay County, Nebraska, United States. The population was 1,447 at the 2020 census. It is part of the Hastings, Nebraska Micropolitan Statistical Area.

== History ==
Sutton was laid out in 1871 when the Burlington and Missouri River Railroad was extended to that point. It was named after the town of Sutton, Massachusetts.

== Geography ==
According to the United States Census Bureau, the city has a total area of 1.99 square miles (5.15 km^{2}), all land.

== Demographics ==
Historical population
| Census | Pop. | Note | %± |
|---|---|---|---|
| 1890 | 1,541 | | — |
| 1900 | 1,365 | | −11.4% |
| 1910 | 1,702 | | 24.7% |
| 1920 | 1,603 | | −5.8% |
| 1930 | 1,540 | | −3.9% |
| 1940 | 1,403 | | −8.9% |
| 1950 | 1,353 | | −3.6% |
| 1960 | 1,252 | | −7.5% |
| 1970 | 1,361 | | 8.7% |
| 1980 | 1,416 | | 4.0% |
| 1990 | 1,353 | | −4.4% |
| 2000 | 1,447 | | 6.9% |
| 2010 | 1,502 | | 3.8% |
| 2020 | 1,447 | | −3.7% |
U.S. Decennial Census

=== 2010 census ===
As of the census of 2010, there were 1,502 people, 612 households, and 414 families living in the city. The population density was 754.8 inhabitants per square mile (291.4/km^{2}). There were 666 housing units at an average density of 334.7 per square mile (129.2/km^{2}). The racial makeup of the city was 93.1% White, 0.1% African American, 1.1% Native American, 0.3% Asian, 4.6% from other races, and 0.7% from two or more races. Hispanic or Latino of any race were 8.6% of the population.

There were 612 households, of which 30.2% had children under the age of 18 living with them, 58.8% were married couples living together, 7.7% had a female householder with no husband present, 1.1% had a male householder with no wife present, and 32.4% were non-families. 30.1% of all households were made up of individuals, and 15.1% had someone living alone who was 65 years of age or older. The average household size was 2.41 and the average family size was 3.02.

The median age in the city was 43.1 years. 25.8% of residents were under the age of 18; 6.5% were between the ages of 18 and 24; 20.6% were from 25 to 44; 25.7% were from 45 to 64; and 21.6% were 65 years of age or older. The gender makeup of the city was 48.9% male and 51.1% female.

=== 2000 census ===
As of the census of 2000, there were 1,447 people, 586 households, and 407 families living in the city. The population density was 853.4 inhabitants per square mile (329.5/km^{2}). There were 650 housing units at an average density of 383.3 per square mile (148.0/km^{2}). The racial makeup of the city was 97.72% White, 0.07% African American, 0.21% Native American, 0.35% Asian, 1.52% from other races, and 0.14% from two or more races. Hispanic or Latino of any race were 3.80% of the population.

There were 586 households, out of which 30.9% had children under the age of 18 living with them, 62.1% were married couples living together, 4.6% had a female householder with no husband present, and 30.5% were non-families. 28.5% of all households were made up of individuals, and 17.1% had someone living alone who was 65 years of age or older. The average household size was 2.41 and the average family size was 2.97.

In the city, the population was spread out, with 25.6% under the age of 18, 5.5% from 18 to 24, 23.1% from 25 to 44, 22.0% from 45 to 64, and 23.8% who were 65 years of age or older. The median age was 42 years. For every 100 females, there were 87.9 males. For every 100 females age 18 and over, there were 88.0 males.

As of 2000 the median income for a household in the city was $34,830, and the median income for a family was $42,273. Males had a median income of $28,452 versus $20,536 for females. The per capita income for the city was $17,683. About 6.0% of families and 7.9% of the population were below the poverty line, including 13.3% of those under age 18 and 3.9% of those age 65 or over.

== Notable people ==
- Tim Anderson, mayor. state senator.
- Jacob Volz, recipient of the Medal of Honor
- Walter Wellman, newspaperman, arctic explorer, hot air balloon enthusiast
