= Tekamah, Nebraska =

- City
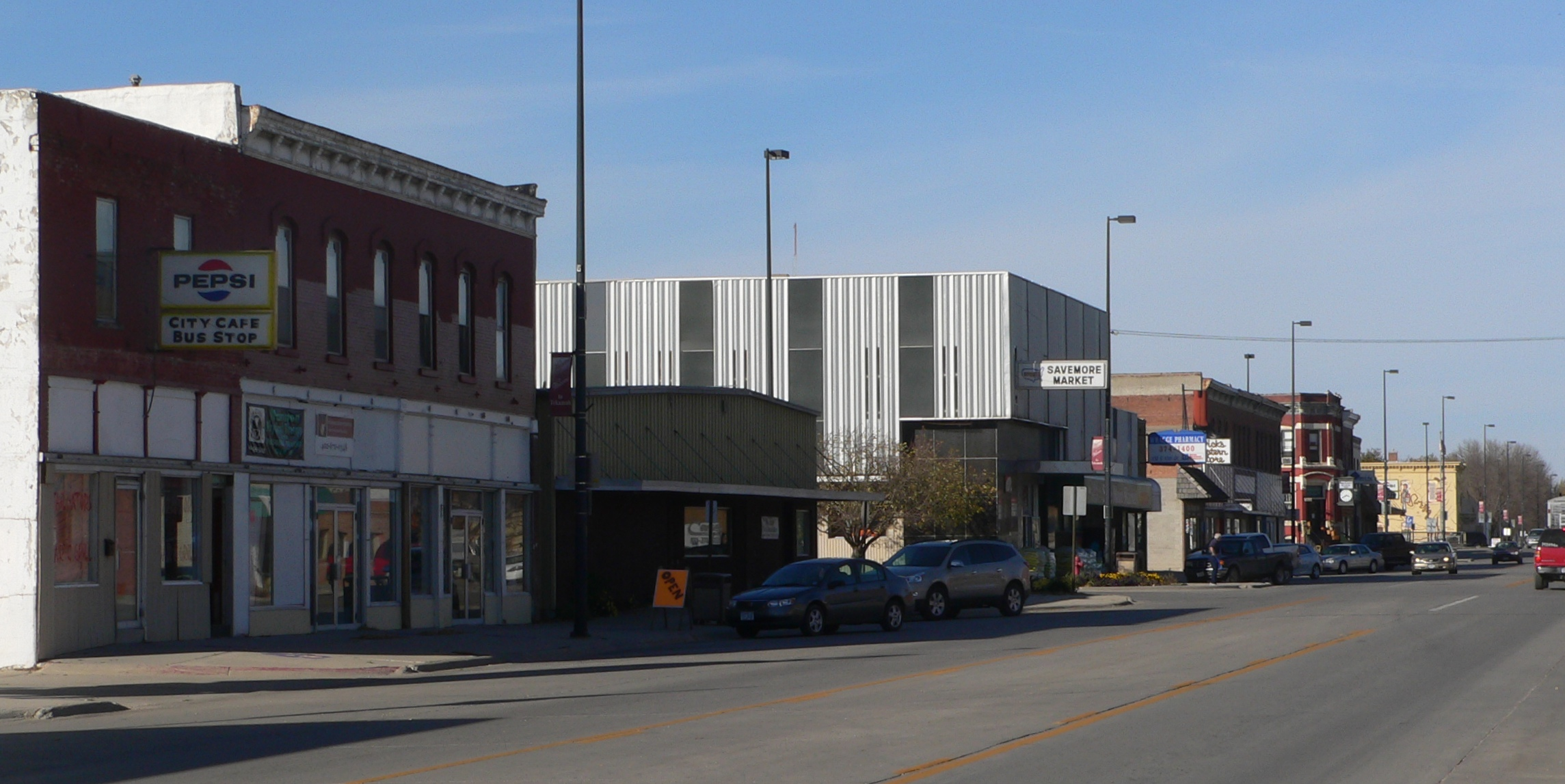
- Downtown Tekamah: 13th Street

- Location of Tekamah, Nebraska
- Coordinates: 41°46′41″N 96°13′29″W
- Country: United States
- State: Nebraska
- County: Burt

Area
  - Total: 1.59 sq mi (4.11 km^{2})
  - Land: 1.57 sq mi (4.07 km^{2})
  - Water: 0.015 sq mi (0.04 km^{2})
- Elevation: 1,056 ft (322 m)

Population (2020)
  - Total: 1,714
  - Density: 1,090.0/sq mi (420.87/km^{2})
- Time zone: UTC-6 (Central (CST))
  - Summer (DST): UTC-5 (CDT)
- ZIP code: 68061
- Area code: 402
- FIPS code: 31-48515
- GNIS feature ID: 838280
- Website: tekamah.net

Tekamah (IPA: tə-keɪ-mə, pronounced "teh-KAY-muh") is a city in Burt County, Nebraska, United States. The population was 1,714 at the 2020 census. It is the county seat of Burt County.

== History ==
Tekamah was founded in October 1854 by Benjamin R. Folsom, and incorporated on March 14, 1855. The name is derived from the Omaha language, meaning "big cottonwood". Its development was stimulated by the construction of railroads through the area, such as the Chicago & North Western, which have since been taken out of Tekamah.

== Geography ==
According to the United States Census Bureau, the city has a total area of 1.32 square miles (3.42 km^{2}), all land.

=== Climate ===
This climatic region is typified by large seasonal temperature differences, with warm to hot (and often humid) summers and cold (sometimes severely cold) winters. According to the Köppen Climate Classification system, Tekamah has a humid continental climate, abbreviated "Dfa" on climate maps.

Climate data for Tekamah, Nebraska (1991–2020, extremes 1893–present)
Month	Jan	Feb	Mar	Apr	May	Jun	Jul	Aug	Sep	Oct	Nov	Dec	Year
Record high °F (°C)	70 (21)	78 (26)	90 (32)	100 (38)	105 (41)	109 (43)	113 (45)	110 (43)	107 (42)	97 (36)	86 (30)	70 (21)	113 (45)
Mean maximum °F (°C)	53.2 (11.8)	59.0 (15.0)	75.0 (23.9)	85.6 (29.8)	91.0 (32.8)	94.6 (34.8)	97.1 (36.2)	95.5 (35.3)	92.2 (33.4)	86.7 (30.4)	71.1 (21.7)	56.7 (13.7)	98.8 (37.1)
Mean daily maximum °F (°C)	32.6 (0.3)	37.8 (3.2)	51.1 (10.6)	64.2 (17.9)	74.9 (23.8)	84.8 (29.3)	88.4 (31.3)	86.4 (30.2)	80.1 (26.7)	67.0 (19.4)	50.4 (10.2)	37.0 (2.8)	62.9 (17.2)
Daily mean °F (°C)	21.5 (−5.8)	25.8 (−3.4)	37.9 (3.3)	49.7 (9.8)	61.6 (16.4)	72.0 (22.2)	75.6 (24.2)	73.2 (22.9)	65.4 (18.6)	52.6 (11.4)	37.9 (3.3)	26.3 (−3.2)	50.0 (10.0)
Mean daily minimum °F (°C)	10.4 (−12.0)	13.7 (−10.2)	24.7 (−4.1)	35.3 (1.8)	48.4 (9.1)	59.1 (15.1)	62.8 (17.1)	60.1 (15.6)	50.7 (10.4)	38.1 (3.4)	25.4 (−3.7)	15.6 (−9.1)	37.0 (2.8)
Mean minimum °F (°C)	−7.7 (−22.1)	−4.2 (−20.1)	6.5 (−14.2)	22.7 (−5.2)	36.0 (2.2)	48.5 (9.2)	53.6 (12.0)	51.5 (10.8)	37.4 (3.0)	23.9 (−4.5)	10.2 (−12.1)	−2.0 (−18.9)	−11.2 (−24.0)
Record low °F (°C)	−37 (−38)	−33 (−36)	−19 (−28)	5 (−15)	23 (−5)	35 (2)	41 (5)	39 (4)	23 (−5)	−1 (−18)	−11 (−24)	−26 (−32)	−37 (−38)
Average precipitation inches (mm)	0.75 (19)	0.89 (23)	1.76 (45)	3.60 (91)	4.52 (115)	4.59 (117)	3.02 (77)	3.90 (99)	3.56 (90)	2.35 (60)	1.45 (37)	1.08 (27)	31.47 (799)
Average snowfall inches (cm)	5.7 (14)	6.6 (17)	3.8 (9.7)	1.4 (3.6)	0.0 (0.0)	0.0 (0.0)	0.0 (0.0)	0.0 (0.0)	0.0 (0.0)	0.4 (1.0)	1.7 (4.3)	5.1 (13)	24.7 (63)
Average precipitation days (≥ 0.01 in)	4.1	4.3	6.0	9.0	10.5	9.6	8.1	7.5	6.9	6.3	4.5	4.6	81.4
Average snowy days (≥ 0.1 in)	3.1	2.8	1.5	0.5	0.0	0.0	0.0	0.0	0.0	0.3	1.2	2.8	12.2
Source: NOAA

== Demographics ==
Historical population
Census	Pop.	Note	%±
1870	122		—
1880	776		536.1%
1890	1,244		60.3%
1900	1,597		28.4%
1910	1,524		−4.6%
1920	1,811		18.8%
1930	1,804		−0.4%
1940	1,925		6.7%
1950	1,914		−0.6%
1960	1,788		−6.6%
1970	1,848		3.4%
1980	1,886		2.1%
1990	1,852		−1.8%
2000	1,892		2.2%
2010	1,736		−8.2%
2020	1,714		−1.3%
U.S. Decennial Census; 2012 Estimate

=== 2010 census ===
As of the census of 2010, there were 1,736 people, 715 households, and 478 families living in the city. The population density was 1,315.2 inhabitants per square mile (507.8/km^{2}). There were 818 housing units at an average density of 619.7 per square mile (239.3/km^{2}). The racial makeup of the city was 96.8% White, 0.5% African American, 1.1% Native American, 0.2% Asian, and 1.5% from two or more races. Hispanic or Latino of any race were 1.8% of the population.

There were 715 households, of which 27.4% had children under the age of 18 living with them, 54.4% were married couples living together, 7.1% had a female householder with no husband present, 5.3% had a male householder with no wife present, and 33.1% were non-families. 29.2% of all households were made up of individuals, and 16.8% had someone living alone who was 65 years of age or older. The average household size was 2.37 and the average family size was 2.93.

The median age in the city was 44.1 years. 24.5% of residents were under the age of 18; 5.8% were between the ages of 18 and 24; 20.9% were from 25 to 44; 25.8% were from 45 to 64; and 22.9% were 65 years of age or older. The gender makeup of the city was 47.2% male and 52.8% female.

=== 2000 census ===
As of the census of 2000, there were 1,892 people, 778 households, and 522 families living in the city. The population density was 1,492.2 inhabitants per square mile (576.1/km^{2}). There were 833 housing units at an average density of 657.0 per square mile (253.7/km^{2}). The racial makeup of the city was 99.05% White, 0.11% African American, 0.48% Native American, 0.05% Asian, and 0.32% from two or more races. Hispanic or Latino of any race were 0.79% of the population.

There were 778 households, out of which 31.1% had children under the age of 18 living with them, 56.0% were married couples living together, 7.5% had a female householder with no husband present, and 32.9% were non-families. 30.1% of all households were made up of individuals, and 18.0% had someone living alone who was 65 years of age or older. The average household size was 2.38 and the average family size was 2.94.

In the city, the population was spread out, with 25.3% under the age of 18, 6.9% from 18 to 24, 23.6% from 25 to 44, 22.2% from 45 to 64, and 22.0% who were 65 years of age or older. The median age was 42 years. For every 100 females, there were 88.6 males. For every 100 females age 18 and over, there were 86.4 males.

As of 2000 the median income for a household in the city was $35,708, and the median income for a family was $41,688. Males had a median income of $30,650 versus $21,125 for females. The per capita income for the city was $16,836. About 5.7% of families and 7.8% of the population were below the poverty line, including 10.8% of those under age 18 and 10.0% of those age 65 or over.

== Culture ==
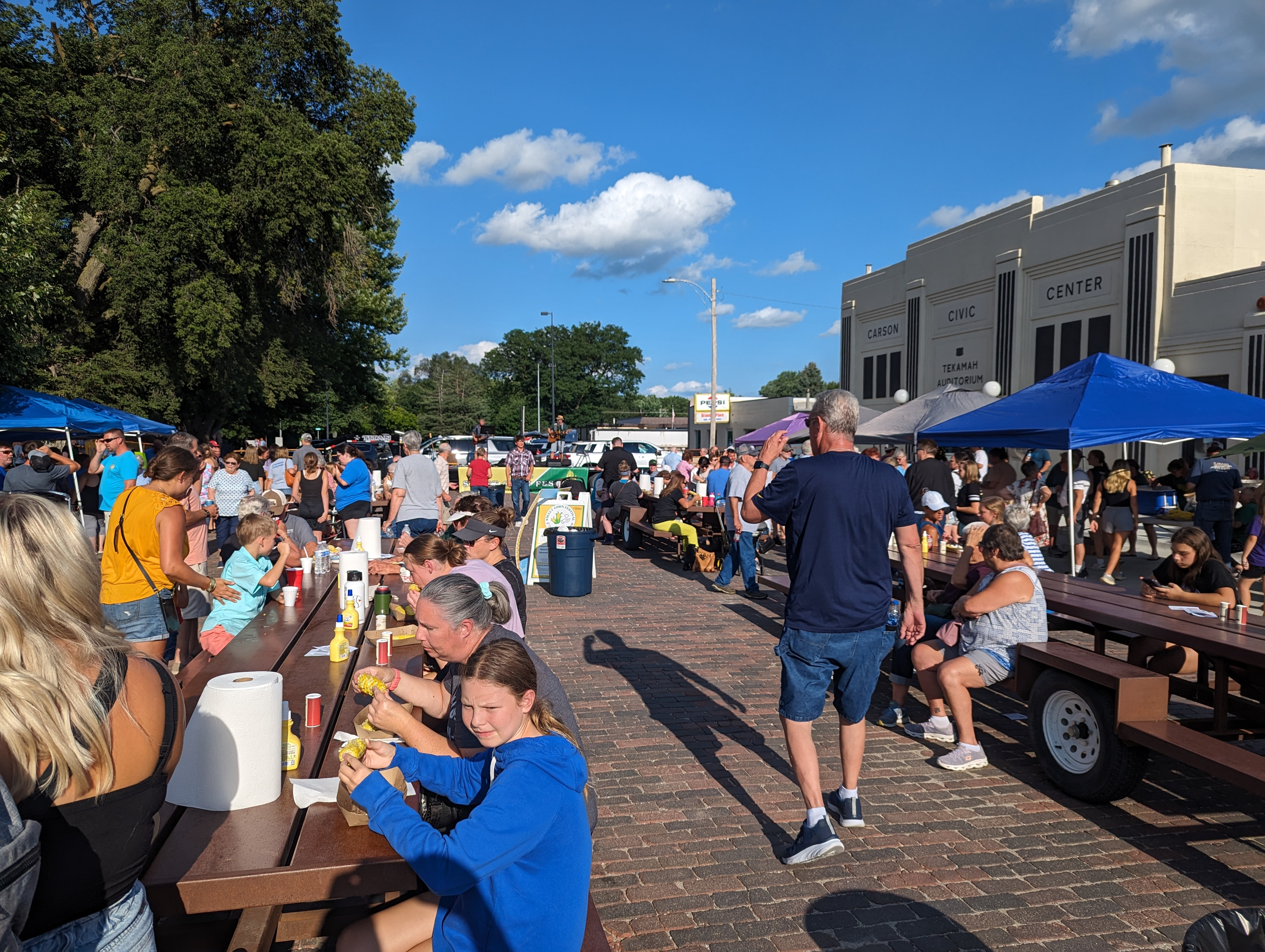
Tekamah's sweet corn festival, 2023

Tekamah Carnegie Library dates from 1916 and was expanded with an addition in 2013. Burt County Courthouse was also built in 1916; it features a colorful floor mosaic of the Seal of Nebraska. Tekamah Auditorium hosts cultural events including the annual feast of the Burt County Cattlemen. The Burt County Museum is in the E.C. Houston House, built in 1904.

Tekamah has a craft cocktail bar in the bank vault of the former Burt County Bank.

The people of Tekamah celebrate an annual sweet corn festival.

== Notable people ==
- Curt Bromm, former Speaker of the Nebraska Legislature
- Hoot Gibson, rodeo champion and early cowboy film actor, director, and producer
- Robert C. Holland, economist, Federal Reserve Board Governor
- Don Stenberg, State Treasurer of Nebraska and former State Attorney General
