= Liberty Township, Missouri =

Liberty Township, Missouri may refer to one of the following places in the State of Missouri:

- Liberty Township, Adair County, Missouri
- Liberty Township, Barry County, Missouri
- Liberty Township, Bollinger County, Missouri
- Liberty Township, Callaway County, Missouri
- Liberty Township, Cape Girardeau County, Missouri
- Liberty Township, Clay County, Missouri
- Liberty Township, Cole County, Missouri
- Liberty Township, Crawford County, Missouri
- Liberty Township, Daviess County, Missouri
- Liberty Township, Grundy County, Missouri
- Liberty Township, Holt County, Missouri
- Liberty Township, Iron County, Missouri
- Liberty Township, Knox County, Missouri
- Liberty Township, Macon County, Missouri
- Liberty Township, Madison County, Missouri
- Liberty Township, Marion County, Missouri
- Liberty Township, Phelps County, Missouri
- Liberty Township, Pulaski County, Missouri
- Liberty Township, Putnam County, Missouri
- Liberty Township, Saline County, Missouri
- Liberty Township, St. Francois County, Missouri
- Liberty Township, Schuyler County, Missouri
- Liberty Township, Sullivan County, Missouri
- Liberty Township, Stoddard County, Missouri
- Liberty Township, Washington County, Missouri

== See also ==
- Liberty Township (disambiguation)
