= Liberty Township =

Liberty Township may refer to:

== Arkansas ==
- Liberty Township, Carroll County, Arkansas
- Liberty Township, Dallas County, Arkansas, in Dallas County, Arkansas
- Liberty Township, Independence County, Arkansas, in Independence County, Arkansas
- Liberty Township, Ouachita County, Arkansas, in Ouachita County, Arkansas
- Liberty Township, Pope County, Arkansas
- Liberty Township, Saline County, Arkansas, in Saline County, Arkansas
- Liberty Township, Stone County, Arkansas, in Stone County, Arkansas
- Liberty Township, Van Buren County, Arkansas, in Van Buren County, Arkansas
- Liberty Township, White County, Arkansas, in White County, Arkansas

== Illinois ==
- Liberty Township, Adams County, Illinois
- Liberty Township, Effingham County, Illinois

== Indiana ==
- Liberty Township, Carroll County, Indiana
- Liberty Township, Crawford County, Indiana
- Liberty Township, Delaware County, Indiana
- Liberty Township, Fulton County, Indiana
- Liberty Township, Grant County, Indiana
- Liberty Township, Hendricks County, Indiana
- Liberty Township, Henry County, Indiana
- Liberty Township, Howard County, Indiana
- Liberty Township, Parke County, Indiana
- Liberty Township, Porter County, Indiana
- Liberty Township, St. Joseph County, Indiana
- Liberty Township, Shelby County, Indiana
- Liberty Township, Tipton County, Indiana
- Liberty Township, Union County, Indiana
- Liberty Township, Wabash County, Indiana
- Liberty Township, Warren County, Indiana
- Liberty Township, Wells County, Indiana
- Liberty Township, White County, Indiana

== Iowa ==
- Liberty Township, Buchanan County, Iowa
- Liberty Township, Cherokee County, Iowa
- Liberty Township, Clarke County, Iowa
- Liberty Township, Clinton County, Iowa
- Liberty Township, Dubuque County, Iowa, in Dubuque County, Iowa
- Liberty Township, Hamilton County, Iowa
- Liberty Township, Hancock County, Iowa
- Liberty Township, Jefferson County, Iowa
- Liberty Township, Johnson County, Iowa
- Liberty Township, Keokuk County, Iowa
- Liberty Township, Lucas County, Iowa
- Liberty Township, Marion County, Iowa, in Marion County, Iowa
- Liberty Township, Marshall County, Iowa
- Liberty Township, Mitchell County, Iowa
- Liberty Township, O'Brien County, Iowa
- Liberty Township, Plymouth County, Iowa
- Liberty Township, Ringgold County, Iowa
- Liberty Township, Scott County, Iowa
- Liberty Township, Warren County, Iowa, in Warren County, Iowa
- Liberty Township, Woodbury County, Iowa
- Liberty Township, Wright County, Iowa

== Kansas ==
- Liberty Township, Barton County, Kansas
- Liberty Township, Clark County, Kansas
- Liberty Township, Coffey County, Kansas
- Liberty Township, Cowley County, Kansas
- Liberty Township, Decatur County, Kansas
- Liberty Township, Dickinson County, Kansas
- Liberty Township, Elk County, Kansas
- Liberty Township, Geary County, Kansas
- Liberty Township, Hamilton County, Kansas
- Liberty Township, Jackson County, Kansas
- Liberty Township, Kingman County, Kansas
- Liberty Township, Labette County, Kansas, in Labette County, Kansas
- Liberty Township, Linn County, Kansas, in Linn County, Kansas
- Liberty Township, Marion County, Kansas
- Liberty Township, Montgomery County, Kansas, in Montgomery County, Kansas
- Liberty Township, Osborne County, Kansas, in Osborne County, Kansas
- Liberty Township, Republic County, Kansas
- Liberty Township, Saline County, Kansas
- Liberty Township, Woodson County, Kansas, in Woodson County, Kansas

== Michigan ==
- Liberty Township, Jackson County, Michigan
- Liberty Township, Wexford County, Michigan

== Minnesota ==
- Liberty Township, Beltrami County, Minnesota
- Liberty Township, Itasca County, Minnesota
- Liberty Township, Polk County, Minnesota

== Missouri ==
- Liberty Township, Adair County, Missouri
- Liberty Township, Barry County, Missouri
- Liberty Township, Bollinger County, Missouri
- Liberty Township, Callaway County, Missouri
- Liberty Township, Cape Girardeau County, Missouri
- Liberty Township, Clay County, Missouri
- Liberty Township, Cole County, Missouri
- Liberty Township, Crawford County, Missouri
- Liberty Township, Daviess County, Missouri
- Liberty Township, Grundy County, Missouri
- Liberty Township, Holt County, Missouri
- Liberty Township, Iron County, Missouri
- Liberty Township, Knox County, Missouri
- Liberty Township, Macon County, Missouri, in Macon County, Missouri
- Liberty Township, Madison County, Missouri
- Liberty Township, Marion County, Missouri
- Liberty Township, Phelps County, Missouri
- Liberty Township, Pulaski County, Missouri
- Liberty Township, Putnam County, Missouri
- Liberty Township, Saline County, Missouri
- Liberty Township, St. Francois County, Missouri
- Liberty Township, Schuyler County, Missouri
- Liberty Township, Sullivan County, Missouri
- Liberty Township, Stoddard County, Missouri
- Liberty Township, Washington County, Missouri

== Nebraska ==
- Liberty Township, Fillmore County, Nebraska
- Liberty Township, Gage County, Nebraska
- Liberty Township, Kearney County, Nebraska
- Liberty Township, Valley County, Nebraska

== New Jersey ==
- Liberty Township, New Jersey

== Ohio ==
- Liberty Township, Adams County, Ohio
- Liberty Township, Butler County, Ohio
- Liberty Township, Clinton County, Ohio
- Liberty Township, Crawford County, Ohio
- Liberty Township, Darke County, Ohio
- Liberty Township, Delaware County, Ohio
- Liberty Township, Fairfield County, Ohio
- Liberty Township, Guernsey County, Ohio
- Liberty Township, Hancock County, Ohio
- Liberty Township, Hardin County, Ohio
- Liberty Township, Henry County, Ohio
- Liberty Township, Highland County, Ohio
- Liberty Township, Jackson County, Ohio
- Liberty Township, Knox County, Ohio
- Liberty Township, Licking County, Ohio
- Liberty Township, Logan County, Ohio
- Liberty Township, Mercer County, Ohio
- Liberty Township, Putnam County, Ohio
- Liberty Township, Ross County, Ohio
- Liberty Township, Seneca County, Ohio
- Liberty Township, Trumbull County, Ohio
- Liberty Township, Union County, Ohio
- Liberty Township, Van Wert County, Ohio
- Liberty Township, Washington County, Ohio
- Liberty Township, Wood County, Ohio

== Pennsylvania ==
- Liberty Township, Adams County, Pennsylvania
- Liberty Township, Allegheny County, Pennsylvania, a former township now part of Pittsburgh
- Liberty Township, Bedford County, Pennsylvania
- Liberty Township, Centre County, Pennsylvania
- Liberty Township, McKean County, Pennsylvania
- Liberty Township, Mercer County, Pennsylvania
- Liberty Township, Montour County, Pennsylvania
- Liberty Township, Susquehanna County, Pennsylvania
- Liberty Township, Tioga County, Pennsylvania

== South Dakota ==
- Liberty Township, Beadle County, South Dakota, in Beadle County, South Dakota
- Liberty Township, Brown County, South Dakota
- Liberty Township, Day County, South Dakota, in Day County, South Dakota
- Liberty Township, Edmunds County, South Dakota, in Edmunds County, South Dakota
- Liberty Township, Hutchinson County, South Dakota, in Hutchinson County, South Dakota
- Liberty Township, Perkins County, South Dakota
