= National Register of Historic Places listings in Fillmore County, Nebraska =

Location of Fillmore County in Nebraska

Fillmore County, Nebraska, United States, has 20 properties and districts listed on the National Register of Historic Places, and one former listing.

The locations of National Register properties and districts for which the latitude and longitude coordinates are included below may be seen in a map.

This National Park Service list is complete through NPS recent listings posted October 30, 2026.

== Current listings ==
	Name on the Register	Image	Date listed	Location	City or town	Description
1	The Auditorium	The Auditorium	September 28, 1988 (#88000950)	160 N. 9th 40°31′36″N 97°36′10″W	Geneva	
2	Belle Prairie Township Hall & Strang Town Hall-Jail	Belle Prairie Township Hall & Strang Town Hall-Jail	November 29, 1991 (#91001752)	Main St. 40°24′50″N 97°35′13″W	Strang	
3	Big Blue River Bridge	Big Blue River Bridge	June 29, 1992 (#92000745)	County road over the West Fork of the Big Blue River, 5 miles north and 1 mile west of Grafton; 40°41′47″N 97°43′44″W	Grafton	
4	J.M. Burk House	J.M. Burk House	February 23, 2001 (#01000169)	331 N. 11th St. 40°31′45″N 97°35′54″W	Geneva	
5	Cesko-narodni sin-Milligan Auditorium	Cesko-narodni sin-Milligan Auditorium	February 29, 1996 (#96000224)	Southwestern corner of the junction of Main and Birch Sts. 40°30′08″N 97°23′30″W	Milligan	
6	Deering Bridge	Deering Bridge	June 29, 1992 (#92000748)	County road over School Creek, 2 miles north and 2 miles east of Sutton; 40°38′25″N 97°49′29″W	Sutton	Exemplary 50-foot (15 m) concrete arch bridge built in 1916. Extends into Clay County.
7	Dempster-Sloan House	Dempster-Sloan House	March 15, 2005 (#05000156)	1212 M St. 40°32′01″N 97°35′49″W	Geneva	
8	Fairmont Army Airfield	Fairmont Army Airfield	March 11, 2003 (#03000105)	Approximately 2 miles south of Fairmont; 40°35′22″N 97°34′35″W	Fairmont	
9	Fairmont Creamery Company Building	Fairmont Creamery Company Building	December 15, 1983 (#83003989)	Southeast of 6th Ave. and F St. 40°38′06″N 97°35′05″W	Fairmont	
10	Fillmore County Courthouse	Fillmore County Courthouse	December 12, 1978 (#78001698)	9th and G Sts. 40°31′30″N 97°36′09″W	Geneva	
11	First Congregational Church	First Congregational Church	December 17, 2025 (#100012251)	906 H St. 40°31′38″N 97°36′09″W	Geneva	
12	Grafton High School	Grafton High School	May 15, 2025 (#100011792)	102 West 2nd Street; 40°37′59″N 97°42′55″W	Grafton	
13	Lincoln Telephone & Telegraph Exchange Building in Fairmount	Lincoln Telephone & Telegraph Exchange Building in Fairmount	March 2, 2006 (#06000099)	635 6th Ave. 40°38′05″N 97°35′07″W	Fairmont	
14	Maple Grove Sales Pavilion and Farrowing Barn	Maple Grove Sales Pavilion and Farrowing Barn	July 16, 2009 (#09000528)	2408 Rd. W 40°22′50″N 97°22′49″W	Tobias	
15	Ohiowa Public School	Ohiowa Public School	July 22, 2005 (#05000725)	202 S. Main St. 40°24′39″N 97°27′12″W	Ohiowa	
16	George W. Smith House	George W. Smith House	May 8, 1986 (#86001022)	12th St. between I and J Sts. 40°31′45″N 97°35′51″W	Geneva	
17	Stockholm Swedish Lutheran Church and Cemetery	Stockholm Swedish Lutheran Church and Cemetery	June 30, 1995 (#95000798)	2.5 miles west and 0.5 miles south of Shickley; 40°24′36″N 97°46′41″W	Shickley	
18	Strang School District No. 36	Strang School District No. 36	June 25, 1992 (#91001753)	Main St. 40°24′43″N 97°35′13″W	Strang	
19	US Post Office-Geneva	US Post Office-Geneva	May 11, 1992 (#92000478)	202 N. 9th St. 40°31′38″N 97°36′11″W	Geneva	One of 12 Nebraska post offices featuring a Section of Fine Arts mural, "Building a Sod House" (1941) by Edward Chávez.
20	Warner's Filling Station and House	Warner's Filling Station and House	July 12, 2006 (#06000606)	737 and 745 G St. 40°31′31″N 97°36′17″W	Geneva	

== Former listings ==
	Name on the Register	Image	Date listed	Date removed	Location	City or town	Description
1	Philip and Addie Ellis Eberhardt Farmstead	Philip and Addie Ellis Eberhardt Farmstead	March 14, 1991 (#91000299)	March 5, 2018	3 miles north of U.S. Route 6; 40°40′51″N 97°27′34″W	Exeter	Farm buildings apparently no longer extant.

== See also ==
- List of National Historic Landmarks in Nebraska
- National Register of Historic Places listings in Nebraska
