= Liberty Township, Nebraska =

Liberty Township, Nebraska may refer to the following places:

- Liberty Township, Fillmore County, Nebraska
- Liberty Township, Gage County, Nebraska
- Liberty Township, Kearney County, Nebraska
- Liberty Township, Valley County, Nebraska

== See also ==
- Liberty Township (disambiguation)
