= Momence Township =

Momence Township may refer to one of the following places in the United States:

- Momence Township, Kankakee County, Illinois
- Momence Township, Fillmore County, Nebraska
