= Vessie, Missouri =

Extinct town in the US state of Missouri

Coordinates: 37°49′41″N 91°53′35″W

Vessie is an extinct town in northern Phelps County, in the U.S. state of Missouri. The community is on a ridge between Kaintuck Hollow to the west and Little Piney Creek to the east at an elevation of 1060 feet. The community is at the intersection of Missouri Route T and a county road. It lies approximately four miles south of Newburg and is within the Mark Twain National Forest.

Vessie served as a post office in eastern Liberty Township. The name was apparently chosen because it was short and unique.
