= Cesko-narodni sin-Milligan Auditorium =

- U.S. National Register of Historic Places
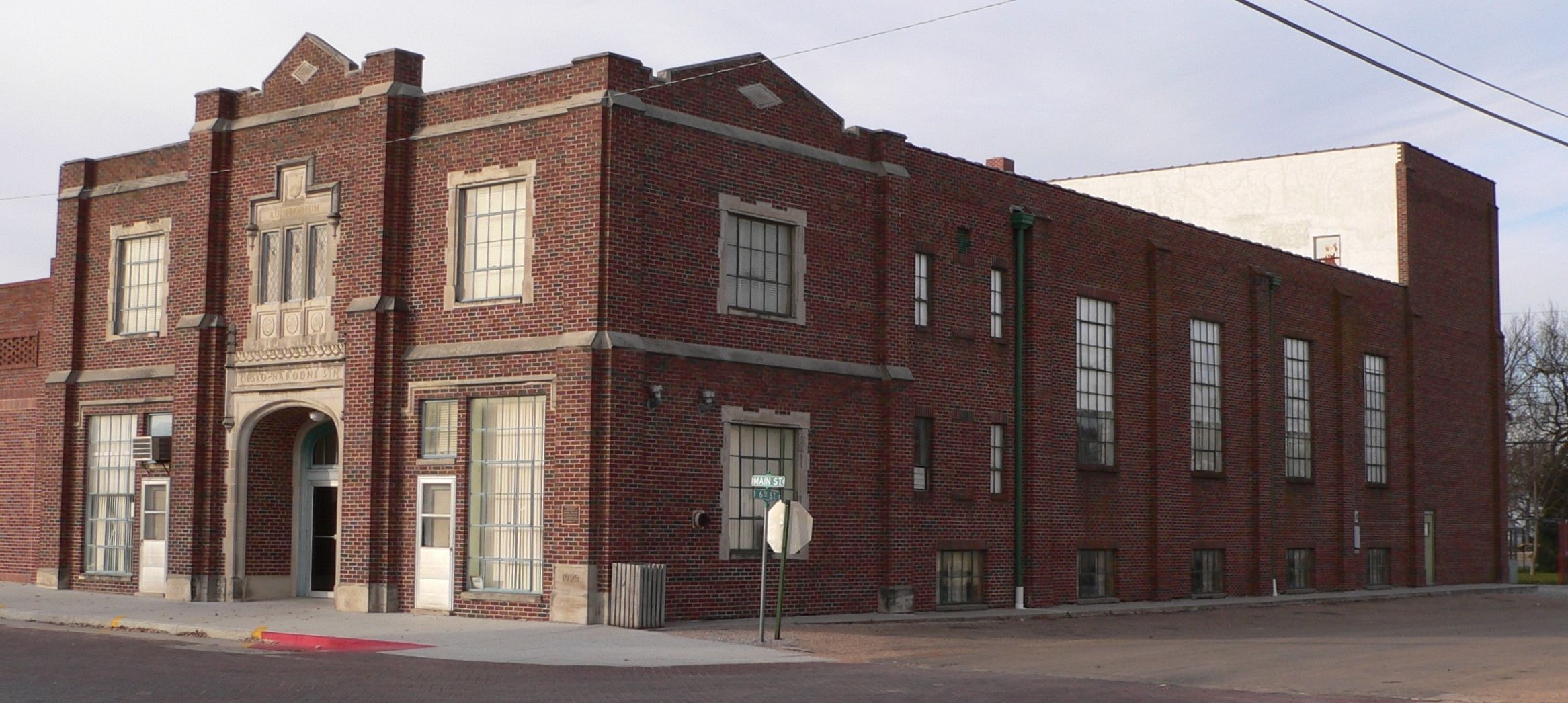

- Location within Nebraska Location within the United States
- Location: Junction of Main and Birch Sts., SW corner, Milligan, Nebraska
- Coordinates: 40°30′8″N 97°23′30″W
- Built: 1929
- Architect: Kritz, E.J., Stake, R.O., Urban, Karel
- Architectural style: Late Gothic Revival, Collegiate Gothic
- NRHP reference No.: 96000224
- Added to NRHP: February 29, 1996

Cesko-narodni sin-Milligan Auditorium, also known as Milligan Auditorium, is a historic building in Milligan, Nebraska, USA, that was built in 1929. It was listed on the National Register of Historic Places on February 29, 1996. The building is a meeting hall for the Czech community. It historically hosted dances, Sokol events, films and Czech theater.

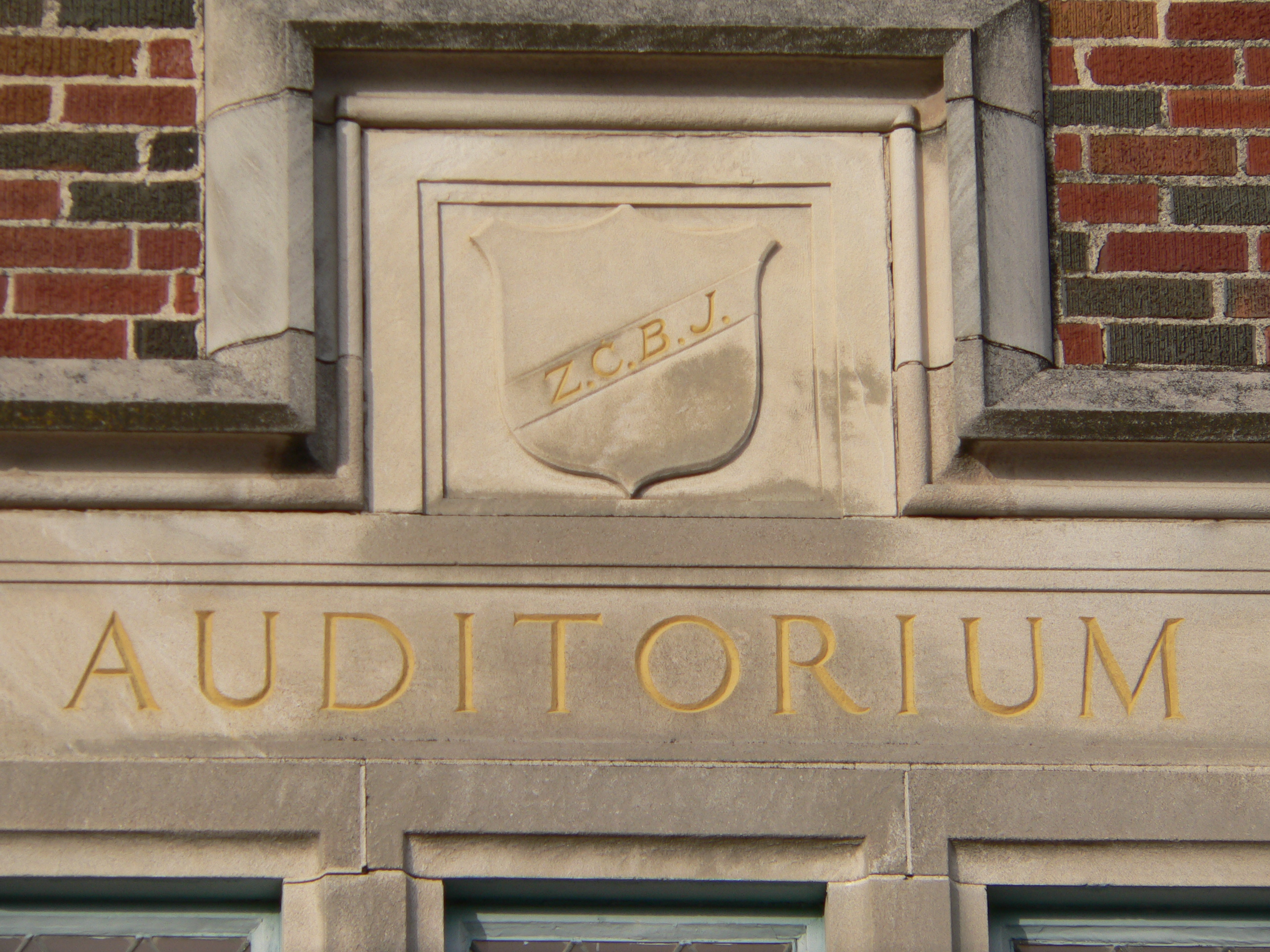
Milligan Auditorium ZCBJ emblem

== See also ==
- Zapadni Cesko-Bratrska Jednota
- Czech-Slovak Protective Society
