= Strang School District No. 36 =

- U.S. National Register of Historic Places
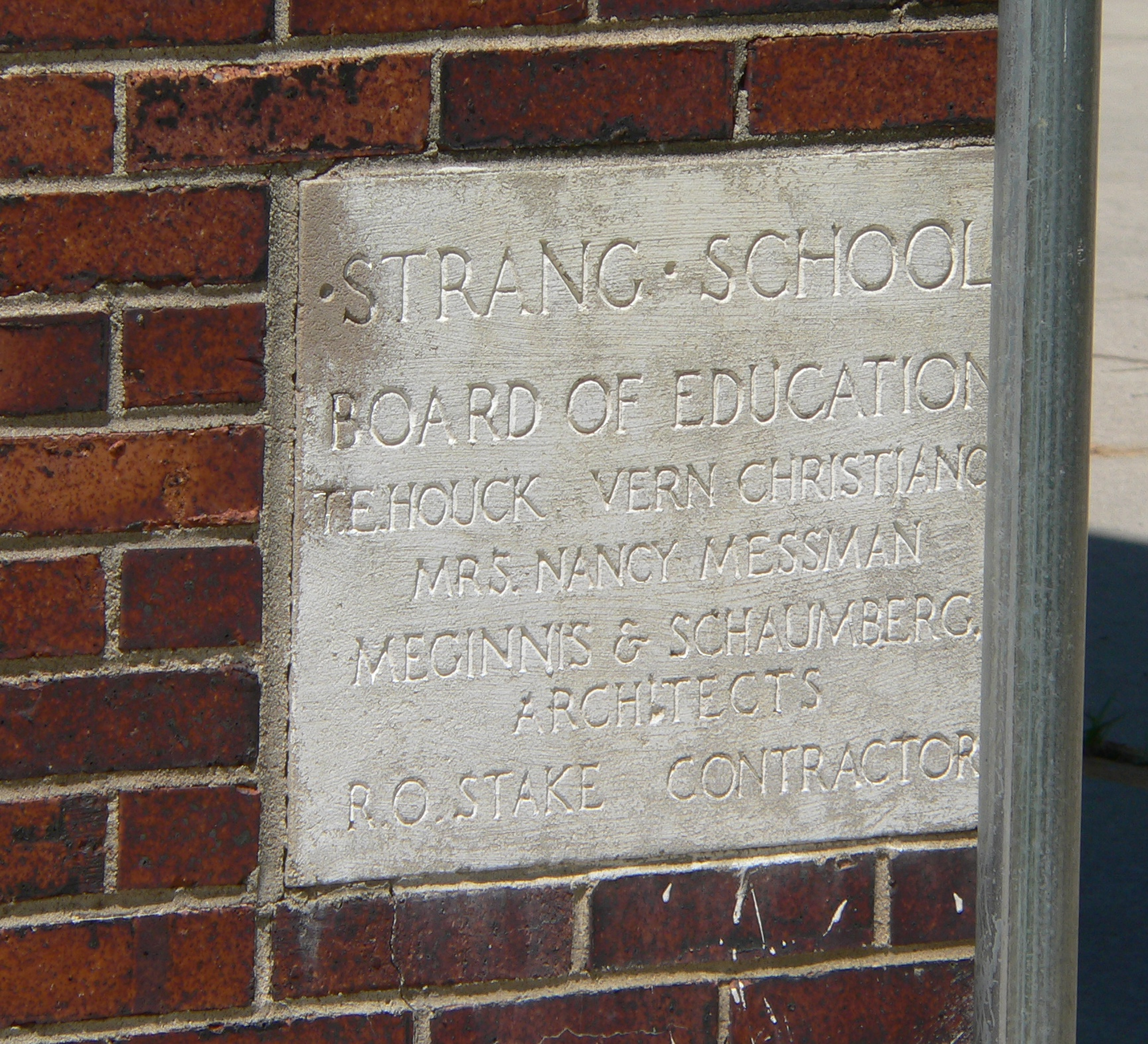
- The cornerstone for the Schoolhouse

- Location within Nebraska Location within the United States
- Location: Main Street and Sharon Street, Strang, Nebraska, U.S.A.
- Coordinates: 40°24′43″N 97°35′13″W
- Area: 2.066 acres (0.836 ha)
- Built: 1929
- Architect: Harry W. Meginnis and Edward G. Schaumberg (Megginis & Schaumberg)
- Architectural style: Renaissance Revival
- NRHP reference No.: 91001753
- Added to NRHP: June 25, 1992

Strang School District No. 36, or the Strang Public School, is a historic school located in Fillmore County, Nebraska, in the village of Strang. The school is one of the two sites listed on the National Register of Historic Places in the village of Strang. The school building is a small, two-story, brick public schoolhouse, which was built to replace the schoolhouse that was previously located on that site. The schoolhouse was built between 1929 and 1930, and replaced the previous schoolhouse, which burned down in 1928. The schoolhouse still retains all original building materials. The school served high school students from 1930 to 1951, and still functions as a school today, serving grades K–8. The NRHP listing also includes a flagpole located outside the schoolhouse, and five pieces of playground equipment.

== History and education ==
In October 1928 a fire destroyed the small school that had previously been located in Strang. Classes were held in two local churches and the Belle Prairie Township Hall for the remainder of that year, while the townspeople held a series of meetings to discuss the construction of a new schoolhouse. Later in 1928, plans for the new schoolhouse were drawn up and approved, and construction on the new Strang Public School began in 1929. The majority of the people that worked on constructing the school were local townspeople. The first classes in the new school were held in February 1930. The schoolhouse was constructed in a "fireproof" fashion, as to prevent another accident. The new schoolhouse was constructed to hold students from first through twelfth grades, from Strang and the surrounding communities. Primary students attending classes were located on the second floor and secondary students classes were held on the first floor. Since construction, there have been no projects undertaken to refurbish or restore the original building, as to protect its historical importance. In 1951, due to a decline in enrollment, the school reduced to serving just students in grades K through 8, and has remained this way since. In fall of 2001, the school had an enrollment of just eight students. By the fall of 2004 (the last published figures available), that number had fallen to just five.

== Architecture ==
The Strang Public School is a near perfect example of what is considered a typical twentieth-century "fireproof" schoolhouse in Nebraska, and is constructed somewhat symmetrically. The school was constructed in a simplified version of the Renaissance Revival style, consisting of two stories, with a flat roof.

=== Exterior ===
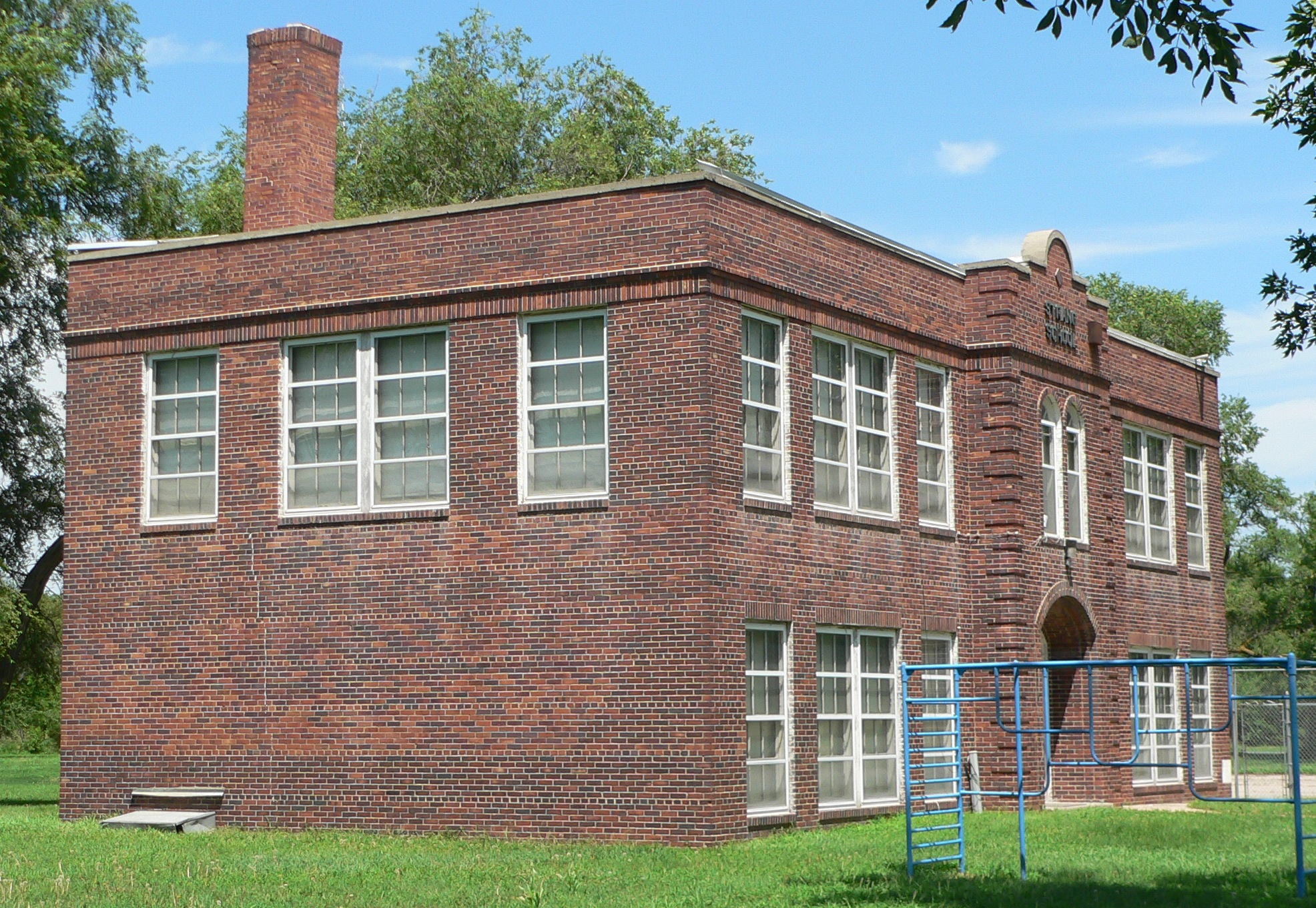
The school, as seen from the southeast

The building is constructed in a rectangular shape, symmetrical on the exterior, and measures 32 feet (9.8 m) by 66 feet (20 m). The approximate height measurements are not provided by the Register. Large, six over six paned windows are located in the front and the back of the building on both floors. Similar windows are also located on the south side of the building, but only on the top floor. There are no windows located on the north side. The entire exterior of the building is constructed from brick. The roof is flat and constructed of roofing cement, with a parapet located around it, with a section of a chimney that sticks out of the south end of the roof. The most prominent feature of the exterior of the building is the large, central pavilion, with a stepped gable parapet wall.

=== Interior ===
The first level of the building contains two classrooms, both of which have a cloakroom, a set of three swivel doors, and a large slate chalkboard that covers one of the walls. The first story also contains two bathrooms, four small storage closets, and a central hall, as well as a large stairwell leading up to the second floor. The second story contains three classrooms, with the same features as those downstairs, along with an office and three small storage rooms. A metal fire escape door is located in the center of the west wall of the second story. The schoolhouse also has a partial basement, which contains a large storage room, a coal room, and a disused coal furnace.

== Geography and facilities ==
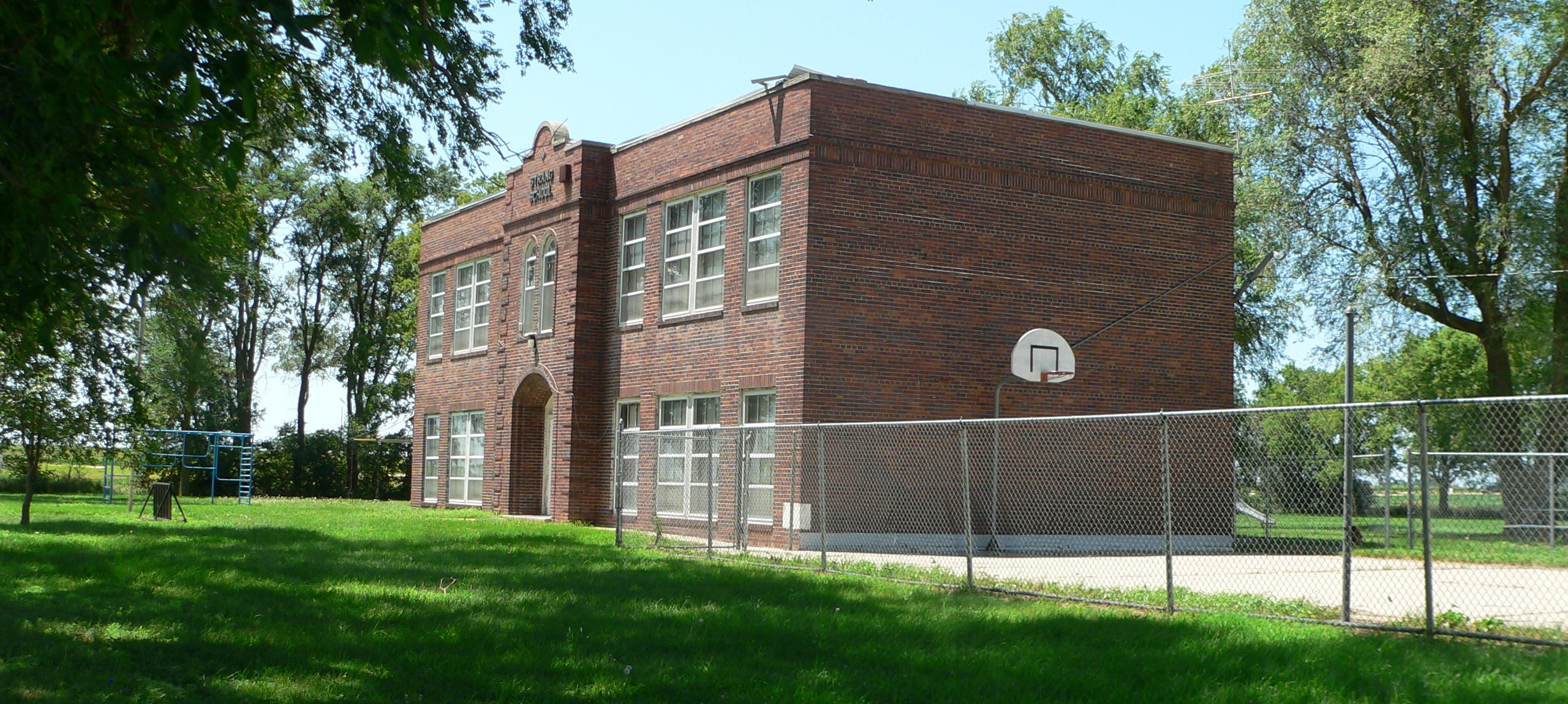
The school's basketball/tennis court

The Strang Public School is positioned at the intersection of Main Street and Sharon Street, on the southern edge of Strang, originally planned as a convenient location for the teachers and students coming from surrounding communities. The campus consists of the main schoolhouse, five historic pieces of playground equipment, a flagpole located in front of the building, a basketball/tennis court located north of the school building, and a large playing field west of the schoolhouse. The entire property is contained inside a 300 by 300 foot square plot of land.

A flagpole is located outside the main entrance to the school building, and is included in the NRHP listing as a contributing feature. A set of gym bars, a tether ball pole, a swing set, a "slippery slide", and a merry-go-round are located on the south and west sides of the property, and are all listed as contributing features. A fenced tennis and basketball court is located on the north side of the property, and a large track and playing field are located on the west side of the property, but none of these features are included in the listing.

== Significance ==
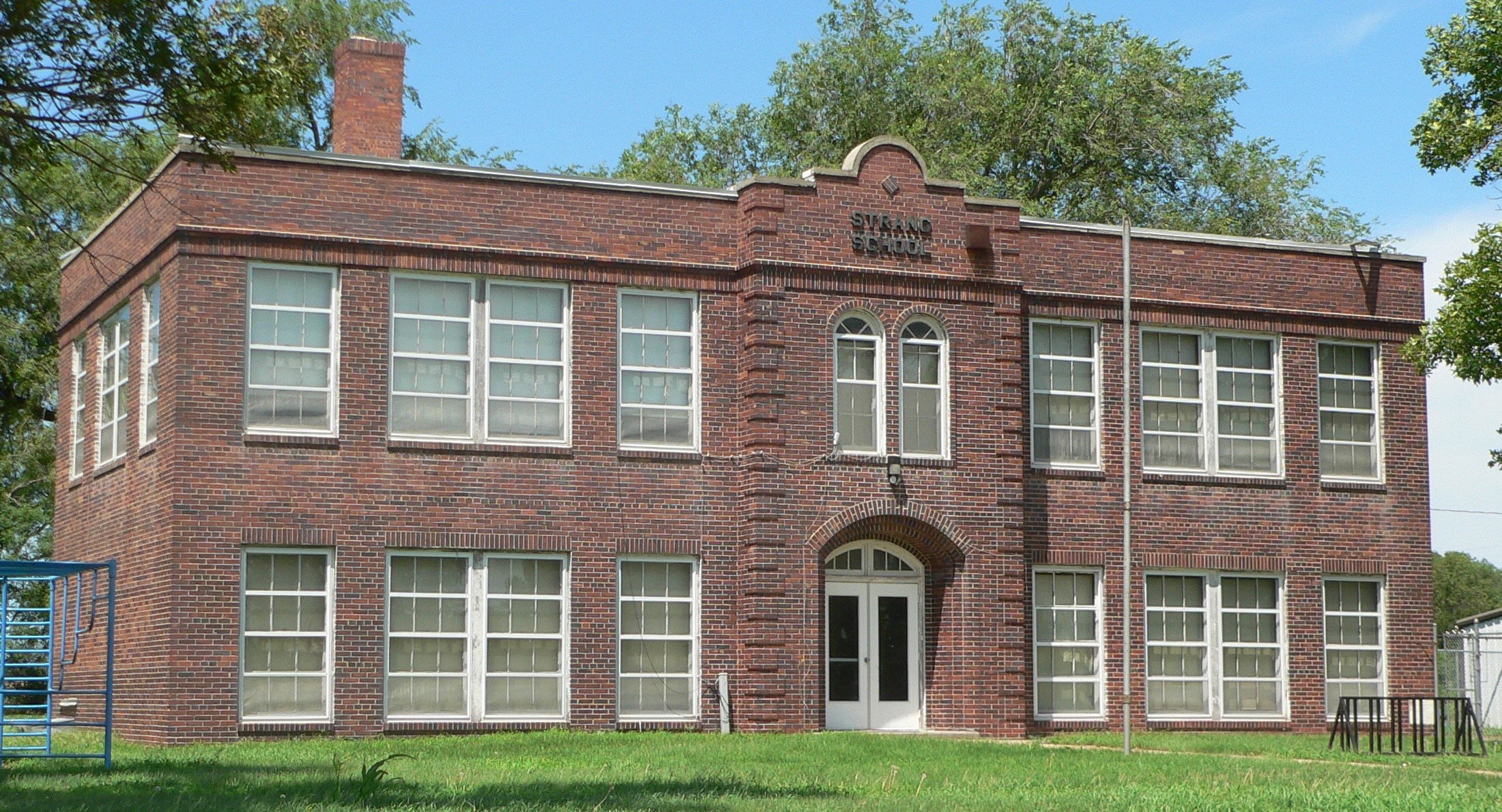
The Strang Public School, as seen from Main Street

Strang School District No. 36 was added to the National Register of Historic Places on June 25, 1992.^{Note 1} On its nomination, Strang School District No. 36 was cited as being significant under criteria C, with the statement: "as a multi-story, brick, "fireproof" school building, an example of a type, period, and method of construction representative of school buildings constructed in many communities in Nebraska, particularly in Fillmore County, during the first quarter of the twentieth century". The school's listed year of significance was 1930, the year it was constructed. The school is considered significant to the surrounding community by Fillmore County, due to its importance to education an historic qualities, being one of the oldest buildings in the area.

== See also ==
- National Register of Historic Places listings in Fillmore County, Nebraska

== Notes ==
1.See page marked "July 2, 1992" on source
