= Geneva Township, Michigan =

Geneva Township is the name of some places in the U.S. state of Michigan:

- Geneva Township, Midland County, Michigan
- Geneva Township, Van Buren County, Michigan

== See also ==
- Geneva Township (disambiguation)
