= Zapadni Ceska Bratrska Jednota =

Zapadni Ceska Bratrska Jednota may refer to:

- Zapadni Cesko-Bratrska Jednota, a Czech language newspaper in the United States, founded in the late 19th century.
- Western Fraternal Life Association, a United States fraternal benefit society previously known by this name.
