= George W. Smith House (Geneva, Nebraska) =

- U.S. National Register of Historic Places
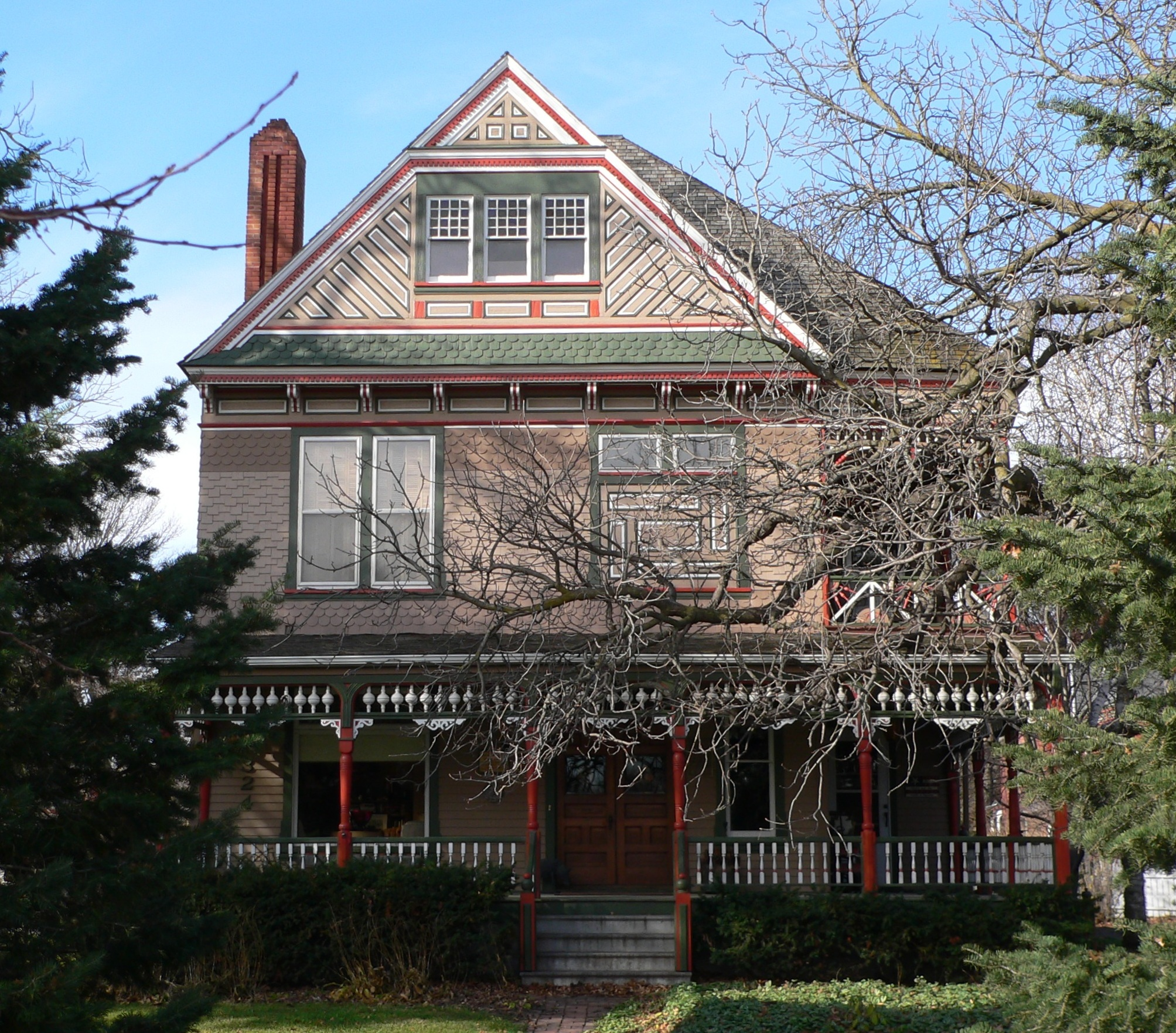
- The house in 2009

- Location within Nebraska Location within the United States
- Location: Twelfth Street between I and J Sts., Geneva, Nebraska
- Coordinates: 40°31′45″N 97°35′51″W
- Area: less than one acre
- Built: 1890
- Architectural style: Queen Anne
- NRHP reference No.: 86001022
- Added to NRHP: May 8, 1986

The George W. Smith House is a historic house in Geneva, Nebraska. It was built in 1890 for George W. Smith, a real estate investor and former banker who lived in the house until 1921. Smith was married Addie F. Dempster, whose brother lived in the Dempster-Sloan House. In 1925, this house was turned into a hospital by a nurse named Anna Eggenberger. The hospital closed down in 1942, and it was later remodelled as a private residence. The house was designed in the Queen Anne architectural style. It has been listed on the National Register of Historic Places since May 8, 1986.
