= Dempster-Sloan House =

- Dempster--Sloan House
- U.S. National Register of Historic Places
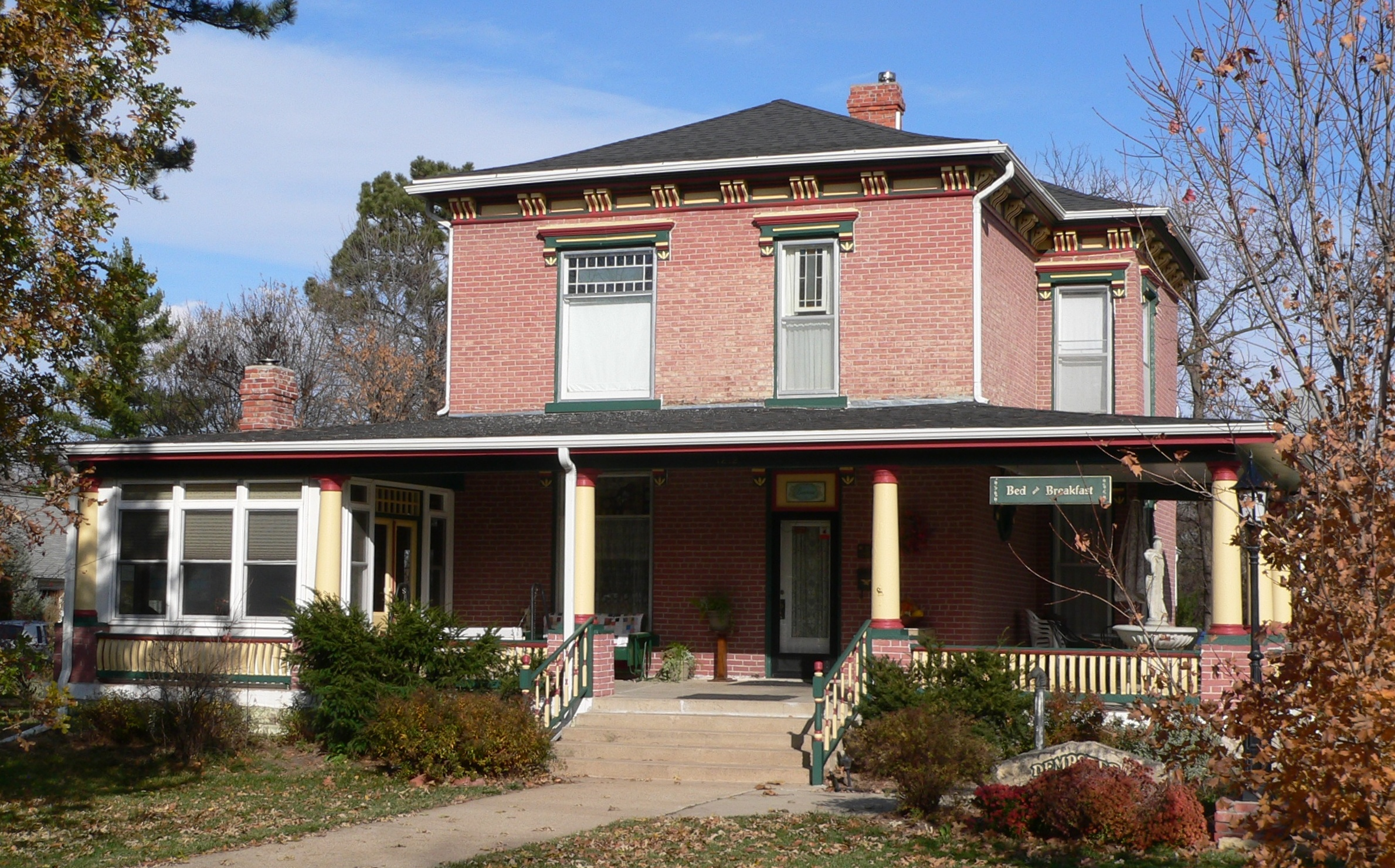
- The house in 2009

- Location within Nebraska Location within the United States
- Location: 1212 M Street, Geneva, Nebraska
- Coordinates: 40°32′01″N 97°35′49″W
- Area: less than one acre
- Built: 1887
- NRHP reference No.: 05000156
- Added to NRHP: March 15, 2005

The Dempster-Sloan House is a historic two-story house in Geneva, Nebraska. It was built with red bricks in 1887 by John A. Dempster and designed in the Italianate architectural style. Dempster had served the Union Army in Illinois during the American Civil War of 1861–1865 before becoming a settler in Nebraska. From 1887 to 1891, Dempster served as a Republican member of the Nebraska House of Representatives. His sister lived at the George W. Smith House. From 1898 to 1946, the house belonged to Charles Henry Sloan, who served as a Republican member of the United States House of Representatives from 1911 to 1919, and from 1929 to 1931. The house has been listed on the National Register of Historic Places since March 15, 2005.
