= Stockholm Swedish Lutheran Church and Cemetery =

Historic site in Fillmore County, Nebraska, US

- U.S. National Register of Historic Places
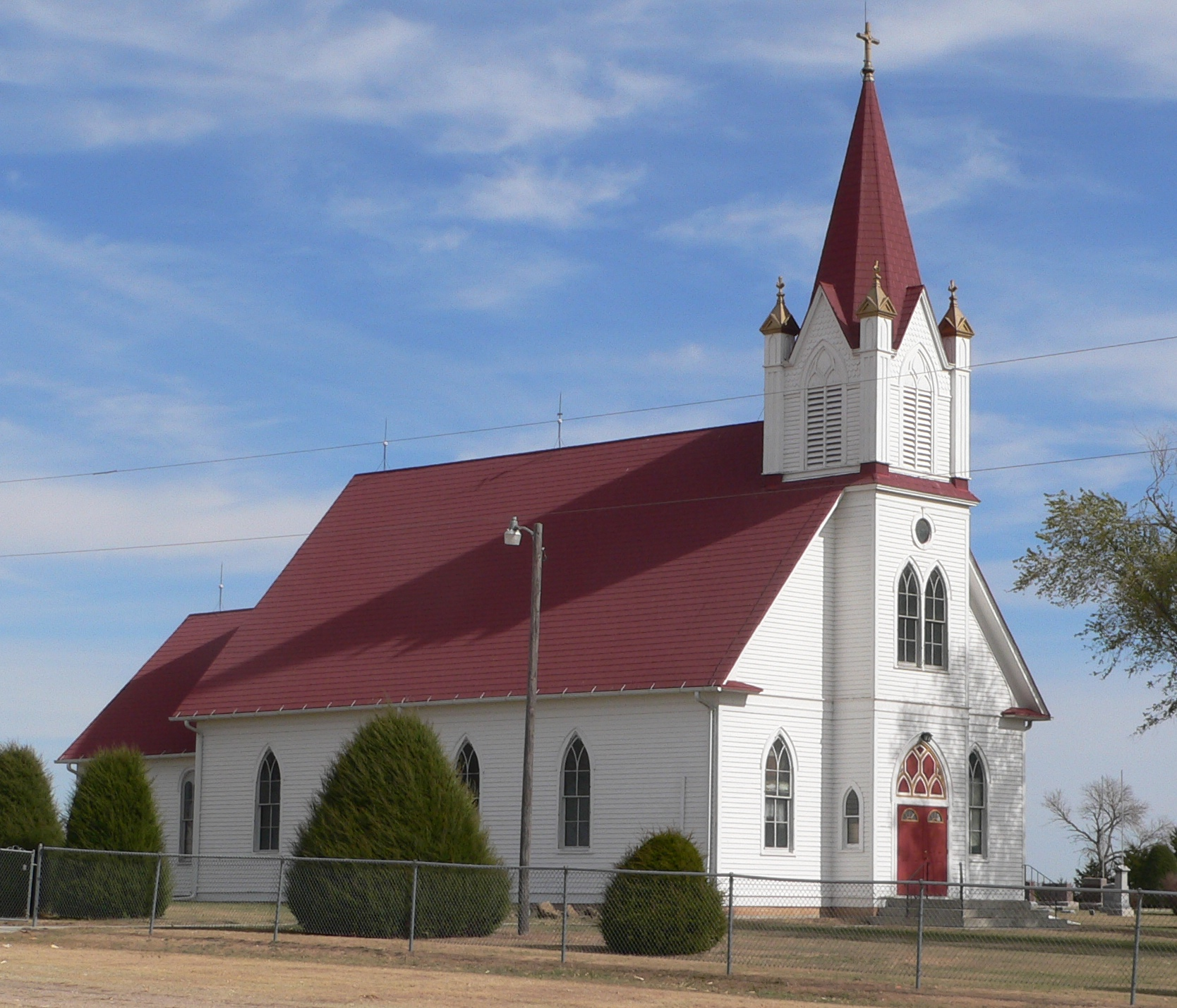
- The church in 2011

- Location within Nebraska Location within the United States
- Nearest city: Shickley, Nebraska
- Coordinates: 40°24′36″N 97°46′41″W
- Area: 6.1 acres (2.5 ha)
- Built: 1878
- Built by: A. A. Gustafson
- Architect: N. K. Aldrich
- Architectural style: Gothic Revival
- NRHP reference No.: 95000798
- Added to NRHP: June 30, 1995

The Stockholm Swedish Lutheran Church and Cemetery is a historic building and cemetery in Shickley, Nebraska. The parish was established in 1875 by immigrants from Sweden. In 1878, they turned a five-acre parcel into a cemetery. The church was built in 1900–1901 by A. A. Gustafson, and designed in the Gothic Revival style by architect N. K. Aldrich. It has been listed on the National Register of Historic Places since June 30, 1995.
