= Madison Township, Fillmore County, Nebraska =

Madison Township
- Township
- Location in Fillmore County
- Coordinates: 40°34′04″N 097°32′23″W
- Country: United States
- State: Nebraska
- County: Fillmore

Area
  - Total: 35.7 sq mi (92.4 km^{2})
  - Land: 35.7 sq mi (92.4 km^{2})
  - Water: 0 sq mi (0 km^{2}) 0%
- Elevation: 1,588 ft (484 m)

Population (2020)
  - Total: 649
  - Density: 18.2/sq mi (7.02/km^{2})
- GNIS feature ID: 0838124

Madison Township is one of fifteen townships in Fillmore County, Nebraska, United States. The population was 649 at the 2020 census.

A portion of the city of Geneva lies within the township.

== See also ==
- County government in Nebraska
