= Chelsea Township, Fillmore County, Nebraska =

Chelsea Township
- Township
- Location in Fillmore County
- Coordinates: 40°28′53″N 097°32′18″W
- Country: United States
- State: Nebraska
- County: Fillmore

Area
  - Total: 35.71 sq mi (92.48 km^{2})
  - Land: 35.71 sq mi (92.48 km^{2})
  - Water: 0 sq mi (0 km^{2}) 0%
- Elevation: 1,611 ft (491 m)

Population (2020)
  - Total: 94 ▼
  - Density: 2.6/sq mi (1.0/km^{2})
- GNIS feature ID: 0837917

Chelsea Township is one of fifteen townships in Fillmore County, Nebraska, United States. The population was 94 at the 2020 census.

A small portion of the city of Geneva lies within the township.
