= Carlisle, Nebraska =

Unincorporated community in Nebraska, United States

- Unincorporated Community
- Location within Nebraska Location within the United States
- Coordinates: 40.4°N 97.8°W
- Country: United States
- State: Nebraska
- County: Fillmore
- Founded: 1901

Carlisle is an unincorporated community in Fillmore County, Nebraska, United States.

== History ==
Carlisle was originally called Walters, and under the latter name was platted in 1901. It was later renamed Carlisle in honor of John G. Carlisle, the U.S. Secretary of the Treasury in the Grover Cleveland administration.
