= Bennett Township, Fillmore County, Nebraska =

Bennett Township
- Township
- Location in Fillmore County
- Coordinates: 40°33′51″N 097°46′32″W
- Country: United States
- State: Nebraska
- County: Fillmore

Area
  - Total: 36.19 sq mi (93.72 km^{2})
  - Land: 36.19 sq mi (93.72 km^{2})
  - Water: 0 sq mi (0 km^{2}) 0%
- Elevation: 1,693 ft (516 m)

Population (2020)
  - Total: 66 ▼
  - Density: 1.8/sq mi (0.70/km^{2})
- GNIS feature ID: 0837876

Bennett Township is one of fifteen townships in Fillmore County, Nebraska, United States. The population was 66 at the 2020 census.
