= Geneva Township, Fillmore County, Nebraska =

Geneva Township
- Township
- Location in Fillmore County
- Coordinates: 40°34′02″N 097°39′15″W
- Country: United States
- State: Nebraska
- County: Fillmore

Area
  - Total: 35.97 sq mi (93.17 km^{2})
  - Land: 35.97 sq mi (93.17 km^{2})
  - Water: 0 sq mi (0 km^{2}) 0%
- Elevation: 1,600 ft (500 m)

Population (2020)
  - Total: 1,213 ▼
  - Density: 33.72/sq mi (13.02/km^{2})
- GNIS feature ID: 0838021

Geneva Township is one of fifteen townships in Fillmore County, Nebraska, United States. The population was 1,213 at the 2020 census.

Most of the city of Geneva lies within the township.

== See also ==
- County government in Nebraska
