= Exeter-Fairmont Consolidated Township, Fillmore County, Nebraska =

Exeter-Fairmont Consolidated Township
- Township
- Location in Fillmore County
- Coordinates: 40°39′18″N 097°25′33″W
- Country: United States
- State: Nebraska
- County: Fillmore

Area
  - Total: 72.00 sq mi (186.49 km^{2})
  - Land: 72.00 sq mi (186.49 km^{2})
  - Water: 0 sq mi (0 km^{2}) 0%
- Elevation: 1,610 ft (490 m)

Population (2020)
  - Total: 1,285
  - Density: 17.85/sq mi (6.890/km^{2})
- GNIS feature ID: 1729756

Exeter-Fairmont Consolidated Township is one of fifteen townships in Fillmore County, Nebraska, United States. The population was 1,285 at the 2020 census.

The villages of Exeter and Fairmont lie within the township.

== See also ==
- County government in Nebraska
