= Martland, Nebraska =

Unincorporated community in Nebraska, U.S.

Coordinates: 40°27′07″N 97°40′17″W

Martland is an unincorporated community in Fillmore County, Nebraska, United States. It lies at an elevation of 1640 feet (500 m).

== History ==
Martland got its start following construction of the railroad through the territory. A post office was established at Martland in 1889, and remained in operation until it was discontinued in 1949.
