= Burress, Nebraska =

Unincorporated community in Nebraska, United States

- Unincorporated Community
- Location within Nebraska Location within the United States
- Coordinates: 40.6°N 97.5°W
- Country: United States
- State: Nebraska
- County: Fillmore
- Founded: 1887

Burress is an unincorporated community in Fillmore County, Nebraska, United States.

== History ==
Burress was founded in 1887 when the railroad was extended to that point. It was named for J. Q. Burress, the original owner of the town site. A post office was established at Burress in 1887, and remained in operation until it was discontinued in 1942.
