= Terry Murrell =

President of Western Iowa Tech Community College
- Incumbent
- Assumed office August 1, 2011
- Preceded by: Dr. Robert E. Dunker

Vice President of Campuses and Student Affairs, Metropolitan Community College
- In office 2005–2007

Personal details
- Born: January 31, 1968 (age 58) Geneva, Nebraska
- Spouse: Amy Murrell (m. 1992)
- Children: Zachary and Connor
- Education: University of Nebraska at Kearney; University of Louisville; University of Nebraska–Lincoln

Dr. Terry A. Murrell is the third president of Western Iowa Tech Community College in Sioux City, Iowa.

== Education ==
Murrell earned his bachelor's degree in mathematics and computer science from the University of Nebraska at Kearney in 1990, an MPA in Labor Management from the University of Louisville in 1995, and a Ph.D. in Education from the University of Nebraska–Lincoln in 2005.

== Career ==
During Murrell's tenure, the college has undergone renovations of existing facilities, seen upgrades to the student learning environments in the Kiser Building and community meeting area in the Corporate College. In 2014, another housing complex, Prairie Place, was added to the Sioux City Campus and a permanent WITCC Le Mars Center was opened.

== Personal life ==
Murrell lives in Sioux City with his wife Amy.
