= Geneva Township =

Geneva Township may refer to the following places in the United States:

- Geneva Township, Kane County, Illinois
- Geneva Township, Jennings County, Indiana
- Geneva Township, Franklin County, Iowa
- Geneva Township, Allen County, Kansas
- Geneva Township, Midland County, Michigan
- Geneva Township, Van Buren County, Michigan
- Geneva Township, Freeborn County, Minnesota
- Geneva Township, Fillmore County, Nebraska
- Geneva Township, Ashtabula County, Ohio
