= Warner's Filling Station and House =

- U.S. National Register of Historic Places
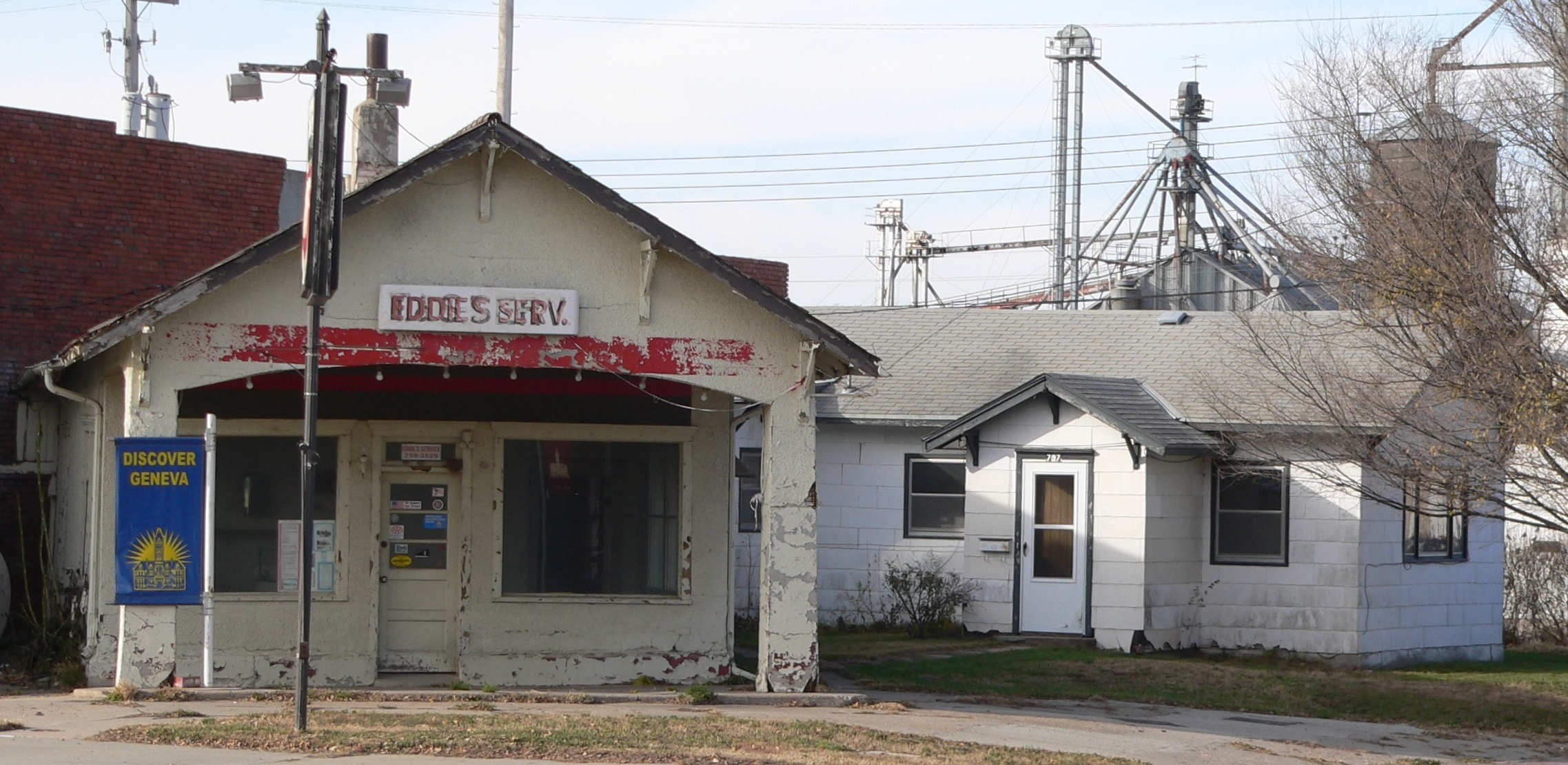

- Location within Nebraska
- Location: 737 and 745 "G" St., Geneva, Nebraska
- Coordinates: 40°31′31″N 97°36′17″W
- Area: less than one acre
- Built: 1922
- Architectural style: Filling station with canopy
- NRHP reference No.: 06000606
- Added to NRHP: July 12, 2006

Warner's Filling Station and House, in Geneva, Nebraska, was listed on the National Register of Historic Places in 2006. The listing included three buildings, located at 737 and 745 "G" St. in Geneva.

It has also been known as Eddie's "66" Service. The filling station building is a one-story frame and stucco structure on a concrete slab and concrete fittings, built in a style similar to a bungalow house, including having bracketed overhanging eaves. It has a gable roof and a canopy supported by two columns.
