= Bryant Township, Fillmore County, Nebraska =

Bryant Township
- Township
- Location in Fillmore County
- Coordinates: 40°23′39″N 097°45′57″W
- Country: United States
- State: Nebraska
- County: Fillmore

Area
  - Total: 36.23 sq mi (93.83 km^{2})
  - Land: 36.12 sq mi (93.54 km^{2})
  - Water: 0.11 sq mi (0.29 km^{2}) 0.31%
- Elevation: 1,660 ft (506 m)

Population (2020)
  - Total: 422 ▼
  - Density: 11.7/sq mi (4.51/km^{2})
- GNIS feature ID: 0837896

Bryant Township is one of fifteen townships in Fillmore County, Nebraska, United States. The population was 422 at the 2020 census.

The village of Shickley lies within the township.
