= Hamilton Township, Fillmore County, Nebraska =

Hamilton Township
- Township
- Location in Fillmore County
- Coordinates: 40°23′41″N 097°39′32″W
- Country: United States
- State: Nebraska
- County: Fillmore

Area
  - Total: 36.04 sq mi (93.35 km^{2})
  - Land: 36.04 sq mi (93.35 km^{2})
  - Water: 0 sq mi (0 km^{2}) 0%
- Elevation: 1,617 ft (493 m)

Population (2020)
  - Total: 94 ▼
  - Density: 2.6/sq mi (1.0/km^{2})
- GNIS feature ID: 0838044

Hamilton Township is one of fifteen townships in Fillmore County, Nebraska, United States. The population was 94 at the 2020 census.

== See also ==
- County government in Nebraska
