= Sawyer, Nebraska =

Ghost town in Fillmore County, Nebraska

Coordinates: 40.59445°N 97.52255°W

Sawyer is a ghost town in Fillmore County, Nebraska, United States.

== History ==
Sawyer was laid out in 1887. A post office was established at Sawyer in 1888, and remained in operation until it was discontinued in 1921. The town was named for Simeon Sawyer, a pioneer settler.
