= Liberty Township, Perkins County, South Dakota =

Liberty Township, South Dakota
- Township
- Location within South Dakota
- Coordinates: 45°52′2″N 102°22′49″W
- Country: United States
- State: South Dakota
- County: Perkins

Area
  - Total: 35.8 sq mi (93 km^{2})

Population (2020)
  - Total: 7
  - Density: 0.2/sq mi (0.077/km^{2})

Liberty Township is a township in Perkins County, in the U.S. state of South Dakota. As of the 2020 census, it contains 7 people and 4 households.
