= Strang, Nebraska =

- Village
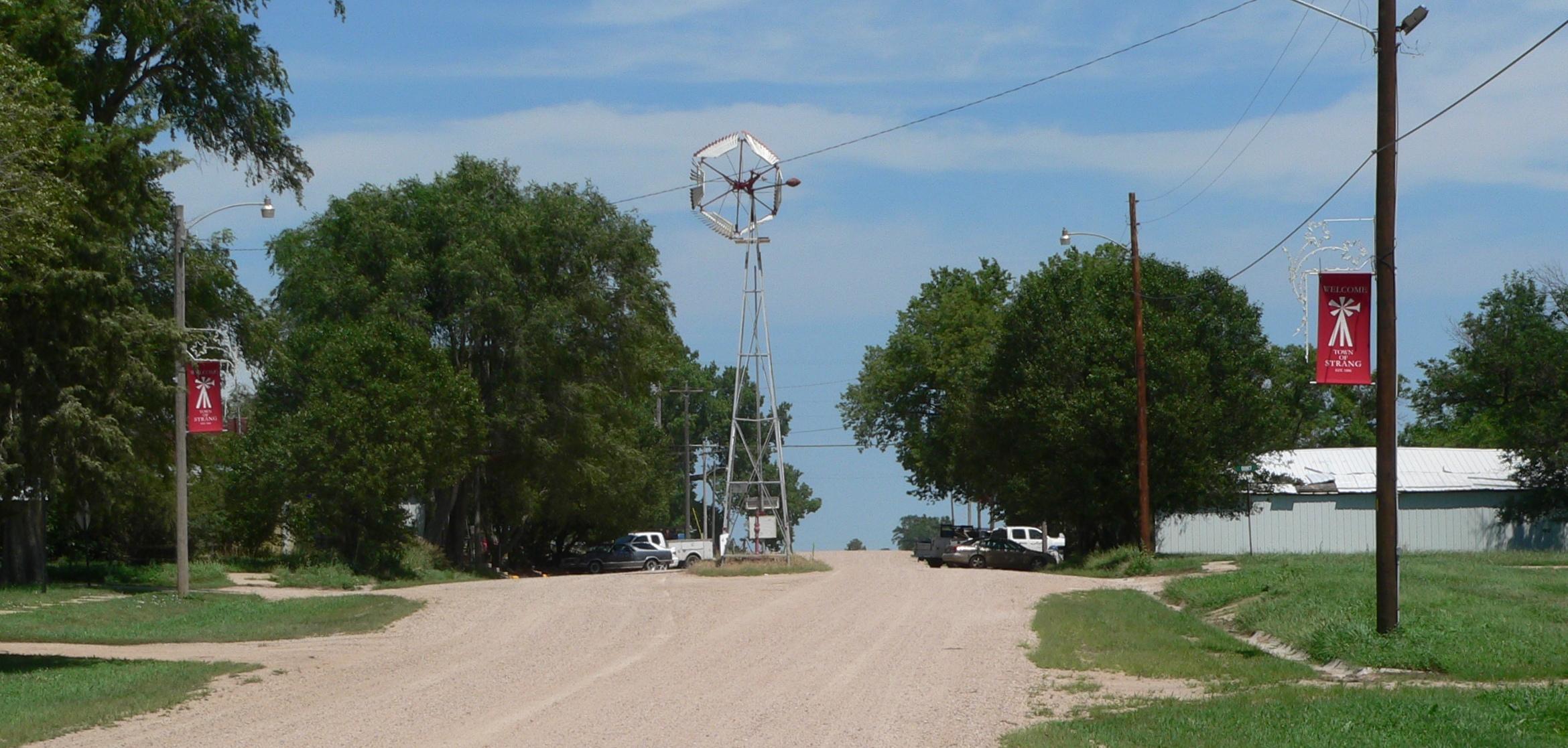
- Downtown Strang: Main Street, facing north

- Location of Strang, Nebraska

- Location within Nebraska Location within the United States
- Coordinates: 40°24′53″N 97°35′14″W
- Country: United States
- State: Nebraska
- County: Fillmore
- Township: Belle Prairie

Area
  - Total: 0.12 sq mi (0.32 km^{2})
  - Land: 0.12 sq mi (0.32 km^{2})
  - Water: 0 sq mi (0.00 km^{2})
- Elevation: 1,627 ft (496 m)

Population (2020)
  - Total: 34
  - Estimate (2021): 34
  - Density: 280/sq mi (110/km^{2})
- Time zone: UTC-6 (Central (CST))
  - Summer (DST): UTC-5 (CDT)
- ZIP code: 68444
- Area code: 402
- FIPS code: 31-47360
- GNIS feature ID: 2399914
- Website: ci.strang.ne.us

Strang is a village in Fillmore County, Nebraska, United States. The population was 34 at the 2020 census.

== Geography ==
According to the United States Census Bureau, the village has a total area of 0.12 square miles (0.31 km^{2}), all land.

Strang is located along U.S. 81, and slightly south of Nebraska Highway 74. Nebraska Spur 30D, known locally as Main Street, passes through central Strang.

== Demographics ==
Historical population
Census	Pop.	Note	%±
1890	269		—
1900	234		−13.0%
1910	238		1.7%
1920	175		−26.5%
1930	153		−12.6%
1940	110		−28.1%
1950	100		−9.1%
1960	68		−32.0%
1970	47		−30.9%
1980	59		25.5%
1990	42		−28.8%
2000	32		−23.8%
2010	29		−9.4%
2020	30		3.4%
2021 (est.)	34	▲	13.3%
U.S. Decennial Census

=== 2010 census ===
As of the census of 2010, there were 29 people, 13 households, and 8 families residing in the village. The population density was 241.7 inhabitants per square mile (93.3/km^{2}). There were 19 housing units at an average density of 158.3 per square mile (61.1/km^{2}). The racial makeup of the village was 100% white.

There were 13 households, of which 23.1% had children under the age of 18 living with them, 61.5% were married couples living together, and 38.5% were non-families. 30.8% of all households were made up of individuals. The average household size was 2.23 and the average family size was 2.88.

The median age in the village was 35.3 years. 24.1% of residents were under the age of 18; 3.4% were between the ages of 18 and 24; 30.9% were from 25 to 44; 27.5% were from 45 to 64; and 13.8% were 65 years of age or older. The gender makeup of the village was 48.3% male and 51.7% female.

=== 2000 census ===
As of the census of 2000, there were 32 people, 15 households, and 9 families residing in the village. The population density was 264.8 inhabitants per square mile (102.2/km^{2}). There were 20 housing units at an average density of 165.5 per square mile (63.9/km^{2}). The racial makeup of the village was 100% white.

There were 15 households, out of which 20% had children under the age of 18 living with them, 53.3% were married couples living together, and 40% were non-families. 33.3% of all households were made up of individuals, and 6.7% had someone living alone who was 65 years of age or older. The average household size was 2.13 and the average family size was 2.67.

In the village, the population was spread out, with 18.8% under the age of 18, 9.4% from 18 to 24, 21.9% from 25 to 44, 40.6% from 45 to 64, and 9.4% who were 65 years of age or older. The median age was 40 years. For every 100 females, there were 100.0 males. For every 100 females age 18 and over, there were 116.7 males.

As of 2000 the median income for a household in the village was $30,000, and the median income for a family was $31,875. Males had a median income of $22,500 versus $24,375 for females. The per capita income for the village was $24,554. None of the population and none of the families were below the poverty line.

== History ==
Strang had its start in the 1880s by the building of the Burlington & Missouri River Railroad through that territory.

Strang was first settled in 1886, and was known as Media. About a month later, it became known as Bixby because it was thought that Media sounded like too many other towns in the area. In April 1886, the settlement was renamed Strang after A. L. Strang donated a windmill and water pump to the town. That windmill still stands today in downtown Strang, on Main Street. Around the turn of the century, fires ravaged the town. The two largest and most destructive fires occurred on October 10, 1899, and July 12, 1934. The fire of 1934 consumed one town block, including the post office, grocery store, cafe, and a residence.

=== Historic sites ===
The following buildings are on the National Register of Historic Places:

- Strang Town Hall/jail juilding
- Belle Prairie Township Hall Building
- Strang Public School

== Education ==
Strang Public School is listed on the national register of historic places. The school was closed in 2007.

== Culture and recreation ==
=== Library ===
Strang has a public library, located on Main Street.

=== Museum ===
The village of Strang owns the Strang Museum, which is located along Main Street and contains articles from the early settlement of that area.

=== Parks ===
- Strang City Park, equipped with picnic tables, grills, and hook-up facilities for campers.
- Pumper Park, a small children's playground.
- Elmer Messman Memorial Field, a softball and baseball field.
