= Fillmore County, Nebraska =

County in Nebraska, United States

Coordinates: 40.52°N 97.60°W

Fillmore County
- County
- County of Fillmore
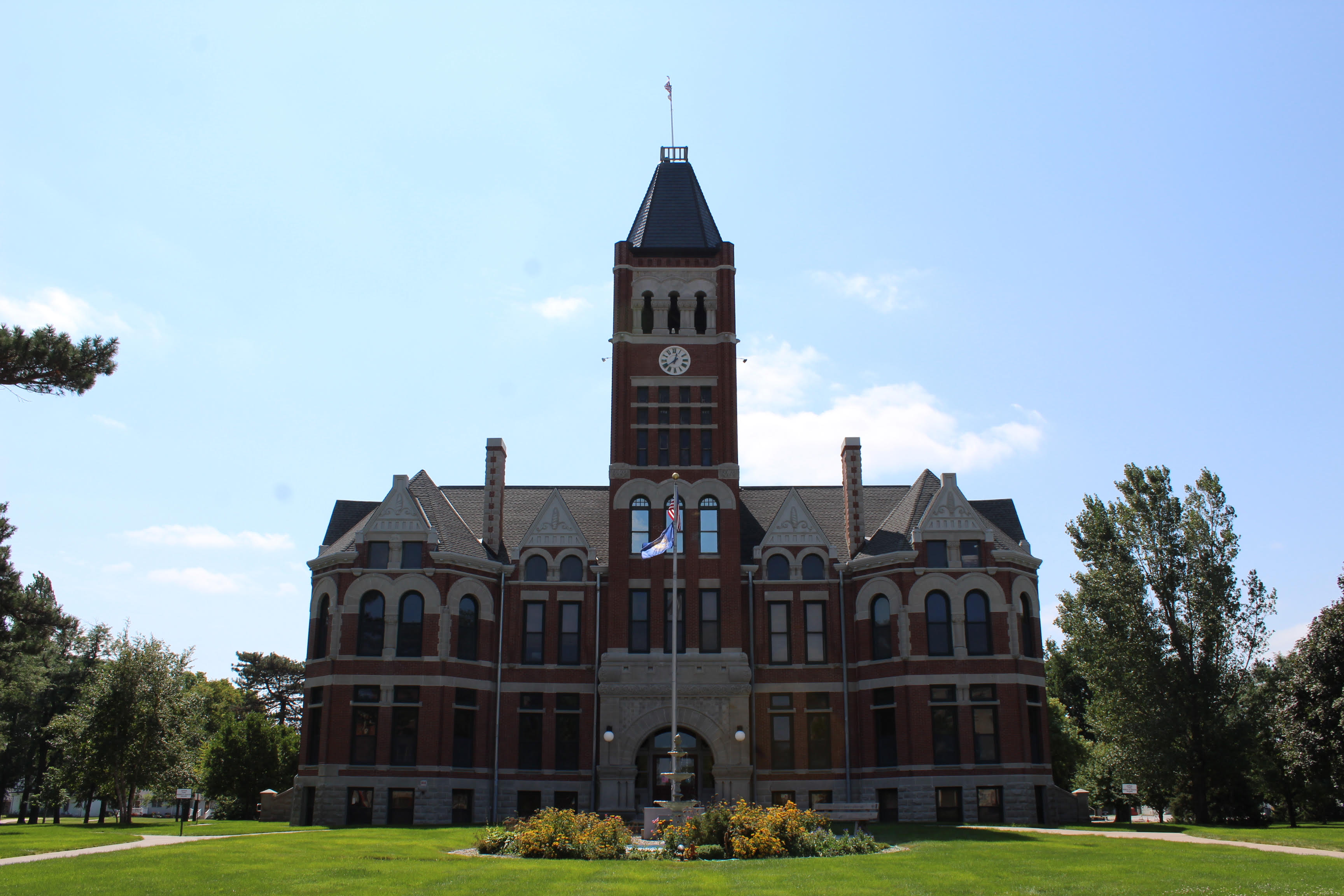
- Fillmore County Courthouse in Geneva

- Location within the U.S. state of Nebraska
- Interactive map of Fillmore County
- Country: United States
- State: Nebraska
- Established: January 26, 1856
- Organized: May 27, 1871
- Named for: Millard Fillmore
- County seat: Geneva
- Largest city: Geneva

Area
  - Total: 577 sq mi (1,490 km^{2})
  - Land: 575 sq mi (1,490 km^{2})
  - Water: 1.2 sq mi (3.1 km^{2}) 0.2%
- Highest elevation: 1,555 ft (474 m)
- Lowest elevation: 1,171 ft (357 m)

Population (2020)
  - Total: 5,551
  - Estimate (2025): 5,458 ▼
  - Density: 9.7/sq mi (3.7/km^{2})
- Time zone: UTC−6 (Central)
  - Summer (DST): UTC−5 (CDT)
- Area code: 402/531
- FIPS code: 31059
- GNIS feature ID: 835851
- Website: https://fillmorecountyne.gov/

Fillmore County is a county located in the U.S. state of Nebraska. As of the 2020 United States census, the population was 5,551. Its county seat is Geneva. The county was named for President Millard Fillmore.

In the Nebraska license plate system, Fillmore County is represented by the prefix 34 (it had the thirty-fourth largest number of vehicles registered in the county when the license plate system was established in 1922).

== History ==
Fillmore County was established, and its boundaries defined, by the Nebraska Territorial Legislature in 1856. It was named for Millard Fillmore, the thirteenth president of the United States, who had left office in 1853.

The first homesteaders arrived in the county in 1866. Ohio natives William O. Bussard and William C. Whitaker filed claims on the West Fork of the Big Blue River in the county's northeastern portion. Settlement of the area was slow until 1870; it was concentrated in the county's northern part, in part because the surveyed route of the Burlington and Missouri River Railroad ran through York County just north of the present-day York-Fillmore county line. In 1870, Fillmore City, the county's first town, was established on the Big Blue about four miles (6 km) north of present-day Grafton; in 1871, the county's first post office opened in Fillmore City.

In 1871, the Burlington and Missouri laid its tracks through the area. A recent change in federal law allowed them to alter their route, shifting it about five miles (8 km) south of their original surveyed path. This placed the route on more level country, reducing the cost of cutting and bridging; it also shifted the line from York County to northern Fillmore County.

The county was formally organized in 1871; up to this time, it had been administered from, and taxed by, Saline County, its neighbor to the east. In April, an election was held to choose officers to organize the county; at this time, it was decided to place the county seat in the county's center. The town site was surveyed and platted, and given the name "Henry". It could not be occupied, since it was on school land owned by the state; an act of the legislature was necessary before the land could be sold.

The legislature passed a bill in the summer of 1872 to allow sale of the school lands. At about that time, the new county seat's name was changed from "Henry" to "Geneva", at the suggestion of the daughter of a local settler, who wanted it named after her family's old home of Geneva, Illinois.

The county grew rapidly through the first years of the 1870s. Three towns were established along the Burlington line; in keeping with the railroad's practice of naming their towns alphabetically, they were dubbed Exeter, Fairmont, and Grafton. By 1873, the entire county had been "thickly settled". Its growth suffered a check in the mid-1870s, due to the worldwide depression following the Panic of 1873 and an infestation of grasshoppers in the late summer of 1874.

As additional railroad lines were constructed through the county, new towns were established. In about 1886, the Burlington built a branch line from Beatrice to Holdrege, running east–west through southern Fillmore County; Shickley, Strang, and Ohiowa were founded on or near the route. A north–south line connected this branch to the Burlington's main line, running from Strang to Fairmont. Milligan was established in 1887, on the Kansas City and Omaha line.

Several ethnic European enclaves developed during the time of the county's homesteading. An extensive Czech settlement covered much of Saline County and extended into eastern Fillmore County, including Milligan. A concentration of Swedish immigrants developed in eastern Clay County, extending into southwestern Fillmore County in the area between Shickley and Ong. German settlements formed in both the county's southeastern and southwestern corners.

== Geography ==
According to the US Census Bureau, the county has an area of 577 square miles (1,490 km^{2}), of which 575 square miles (1,490 km^{2}) is land and 1.2 square miles (3.1 km^{2}) (0.2%) is water.

The county lies within the watershed of the Big Blue River. Water in the county drains via the West Fork of the Big Blue; via Turkey Creek, which runs into the Big Blue near De Witt, Nebraska; and via the Little Blue, which joins the Big Blue in Kansas.

Fillmore County lies within the eastern portion of Nebraska's loess plain, a region of soil deposited by the wind between 25,000 and 13,000 years ago, forming a plain that slopes to the southeast. The Big Blue and its tributaries have incised channels into the loess surface in places, but in much of the county the original plain remains. These loess-plain regions are characterized by extensive upland flats with shallow depressions, lined with fine-grained and relatively impermeable silt, and tend to form shallow ephemeral wetlands when filled with rain or snowmelt; such wetlands range in area from less than 40 acres (16 ha) to more than 500 acres (200 ha).

The county's surface is underlain by Cretaceous sedimentary bedrock, topped with unconsolidated Quaternary sediments. The bedrock was eroded into hills and valleys before the deposition of the overlying sediments, so the thickness of the latter varies. The unconsolidated sediments range in thickness from 60 to 450 feet (18 to 137 m); they form an aquifer whose saturated zone ranges in thickness from 20 to 350 feet (6.1 to 106.7 m).

=== Adjacent counties ===
- York County – north
- Seward County – northeast
- Saline County – east
- Jefferson County – southeast
- Thayer County – south
- Nuckolls County – southwest
- Clay County – west
- Hamilton County – northwest

=== Protected areas ===
- Bluebill State Wildlife Management Area
- Marsh Hawk State Wildlife Management Area
- Morphy Lagoon National Wildlife Management Area
- Rauscher Lagoon National Wildlife Management Area
- Redhead Wildlife Management Area
- Rolland Lagoon National Wildlife Management Area
- Sandpiper State Wildlife Management Area
- Sora Wildlife Management Area

== Demographics ==
Historical population
Census	Pop.	Note	%±
1870	238		—
1880	10,204		4,187.4%
1890	16,022		57.0%
1900	15,087		−5.8%
1910	14,674		−2.7%
1920	13,671		−6.8%
1930	12,971		−5.1%
1940	11,417		−12.0%
1950	9,610		−15.8%
1960	9,425		−1.9%
1970	8,137		−13.7%
1980	7,920		−2.7%
1990	7,103		−10.3%
2000	6,634		−6.6%
2010	5,890		−11.2%
2020	5,551		−5.8%
2025 (est.)	5,458	▼	−1.7%
US Decennial Census; 1790-1960 1900-1990; 1990-2000 2010

=== 2020 census ===
As of the 2020 census, the county had a population of 5,551. The median age was 45.5 years. 22.7% of residents were under the age of 18 and 24.9% of residents were 65 years of age or older. For every 100 females there were 101.3 males, and for every 100 females age 18 and over there were 98.4 males age 18 and over.

The racial makeup of the county was 94.2% White, 0.4% Black or African American, 0.4% American Indian and Alaska Native, 0.2% Asian, 0.0% Native Hawaiian and Pacific Islander, 1.2% from some other race, and 3.6% from two or more races. Hispanic or Latino residents of any race comprised 3.2% of the population.

0.0% of residents lived in urban areas, while 100.0% lived in rural areas.

There were 2,386 households in the county, of which 25.6% had children under the age of 18 living with them and 21.8% had a female householder with no spouse or partner present. About 32.2% of all households were made up of individuals and 16.5% had someone living alone who was 65 years of age or older.

There were 2,718 housing units, of which 12.2% were vacant. Among occupied housing units, 77.6% were owner-occupied and 22.4% were renter-occupied. The homeowner vacancy rate was 3.8% and the rental vacancy rate was 8.2%.

=== 2000 census ===
As of the 2000 United States census, there were 6,634 people, 2,689 households, and 1,801 families in the county. The population density was 12 people per square mile (4.6 people/km^{2}). There were 2,990 housing units at an average density of 5 units per square mile (1.9/km^{2}). The racial makeup of the county was 97.75% White, 0.21% Black or African American, 0.44% Native American, 0.06% Asian, 0.02% Pacific Islander, 0.83% from other races, and 0.69% from two or more races. 1.66% of the population were Hispanic or Latino of any race. 48.6% were of German, 10.4% Czech, 7.1% Irish and 7.0% English ancestry.

There were 2,689 households, out of which 30.20% had children under the age of 18 living with them, 59.10% were married couples living together, 5.00% had a female householder with no husband present, and 33.00% were non-families. 30.20% of all households were made up of individuals, and 16.30% had someone living alone who was 65 years of age or older. The average household size was 2.37 and the average family size was 2.95.

The county population contained 26.30% under the age of 18, 5.10% from 18 to 24, 24.00% from 25 to 44, 23.30% from 45 to 64, and 21.30% who were 65 years of age or older. The median age was 41 years. For every 100 females there were 93.50 males. For every 100 females age 18 and over, there were 91.30 males.

The median income for a household in the county was $35,162, and the median income for a family was $41,725. Males had a median income of $29,813 versus $18,507 for females. The per capita income for the county was $17,465. About 4.80% of families and 7.80% of the population were below the poverty line, including 8.20% of those under age 18 and 10.00% of those age 65 or over.

== Transportation ==
- U.S. Route 81 – enters from Thayer County; runs northward into York County.
- U.S. Route 6 runs east–west across the northern part of the county.
- Nebraska Highway 41 runs east–west across the central portion of the county.
- Nebraska Highway 74 runs east–west through the southern part of the county.
- BNSF Railway – runs east–west across northern Fillmore County, passing Exeter, Fairmont, and Grafton.

In the Nebraska license plate system, Fillmore County is represented by the prefix 34: when the state began using county numbers on its license plates in 1922, it had the 34th-largest number of registered vehicles.

== Communities ==
=== City ===
- Geneva (county seat)

=== Villages ===
- Exeter
- Fairmont
- Grafton
- Milligan
- Ohiowa
- Shickley
- Strang

=== Unincorporated communities ===
- Burress
- Carlisle
- Martland

=== Ghost towns ===
- Dudley
- Sawyer
- Buxton
- Turkey Creek
- Martland
- Lyman
- Fillmore
- Bryant
- Eden

=== Townships ===
- Belle Prairie
- Bennett
- Bryant
- Chelsea
- Exeter-Fairmont
- Franklin
- Geneva
- Glengary
- Grafton
- Hamilton
- Liberty
- Madison
- Momence
- Stanton
- West Blue

== Politics ==
Fillmore County voters have been reliably Republican since the beginning, selecting the Republican Party candidate in 80% of national elections (as of 2024).

United States presidential election results for Fillmore County, Nebraska
Year	Republican		Democratic		Third party(ies)	
Year	No.	%	No.	%	No.	%
1900	1,883	49.60%	1,860	49.00%	53	1.40%
1904	1,980	56.70%	837	23.97%	675	19.33%
1908	1,756	46.10%	1,989	52.22%	64	1.68%
1912	972	26.89%	1,736	48.02%	907	25.09%
1916	1,561	43.95%	1,911	53.80%	80	2.25%
1920	2,803	63.43%	1,549	35.05%	67	1.52%
1924	2,758	51.54%	2,156	40.29%	437	8.17%
1928	3,479	60.55%	2,235	38.90%	32	0.56%
1932	2,178	37.03%	3,655	62.15%	48	0.82%
1936	2,858	47.15%	3,154	52.03%	50	0.82%
1940	3,677	65.13%	1,969	34.87%	0	0.00%
1944	3,362	65.28%	1,788	34.72%	0	0.00%
1948	2,677	58.54%	1,896	41.46%	0	0.00%
1952	3,603	74.77%	1,216	25.23%	0	0.00%
1956	3,137	66.94%	1,549	33.06%	0	0.00%
1960	2,842	61.09%	1,810	38.91%	0	0.00%
1964	1,936	43.67%	2,497	56.33%	0	0.00%
1968	2,213	59.60%	1,297	34.93%	203	5.47%
1972	2,511	66.41%	1,270	33.59%	0	0.00%
1976	2,098	57.15%	1,489	40.56%	84	2.29%
1980	2,435	65.00%	1,025	27.36%	286	7.63%
1984	2,474	70.46%	1,009	28.74%	28	0.80%
1988	1,955	57.20%	1,435	41.98%	28	0.82%
1992	1,501	42.93%	990	28.32%	1,005	28.75%
1996	1,696	54.80%	1,058	34.18%	341	11.02%
2000	2,024	67.51%	848	28.29%	126	4.20%
2004	2,314	72.47%	828	25.93%	51	1.60%
2008	1,913	64.91%	962	32.64%	72	2.44%
2012	2,007	69.71%	807	28.03%	65	2.26%
2016	2,130	72.42%	613	20.84%	198	6.73%
2020	2,359	74.94%	693	22.01%	96	3.05%
2024	2,315	76.55%	662	21.89%	47	1.55%

== Notable residents ==
- Margaret E. Haughawout (1874–1964), Fillmore County superintendent of schools, 1919–1923; taught at Pittsburg State Teachers College from 1923 to 1934

== See also ==
- National Register of Historic Places listings in Fillmore County, Nebraska
