= Milligan, Nebraska =

- Village
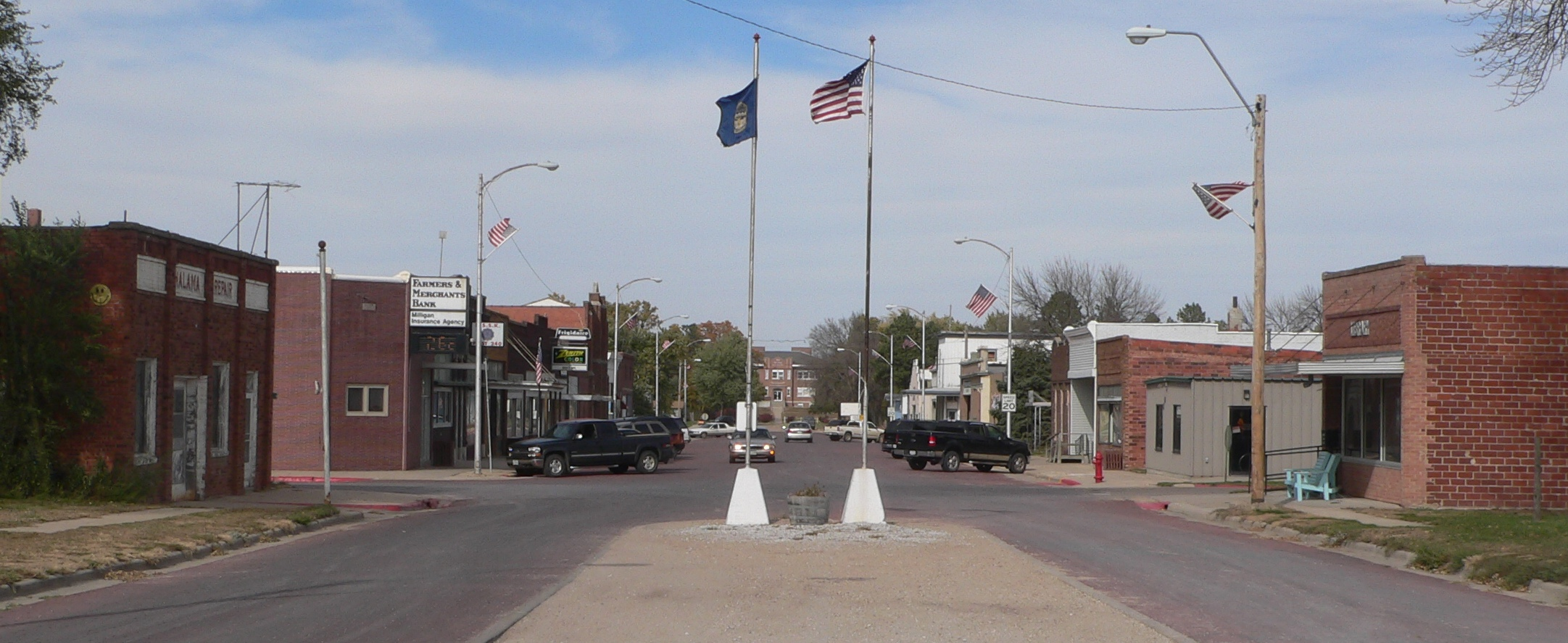
- Downtown Milligan

- Location of Milligan, Nebraska

- Location within Nebraska Location within the United States
- Coordinates: 40°30′00″N 97°23′18″W
- Country: United States
- State: Nebraska
- County: Fillmore
- Township: Glengary

Area
  - Total: 0.25 sq mi (0.65 km^{2})
  - Land: 0.25 sq mi (0.65 km^{2})
  - Water: 0 sq mi (0.00 km^{2})
- Elevation: 1,604 ft (489 m)

Population (2020)
  - Total: 241
  - Estimate (2021): 241
  - Density: 960/sq mi (370/km^{2})
- Time zone: UTC-6 (Central (CST))
  - Summer (DST): UTC-5 (CDT)
- ZIP code: 68406
- Area code: 402
- FIPS code: 31-32200
- GNIS feature ID: 2399360
- Website: www.milligannebraska.org

Milligan is a village in Fillmore County, Nebraska, United States. The population was 241 at the 2020 census.

== History ==
Milligan was laid out in 1887 when the Kansas City and Omaha Railroad was extended to that point. It was named for Frank Milligan, a railroad official.

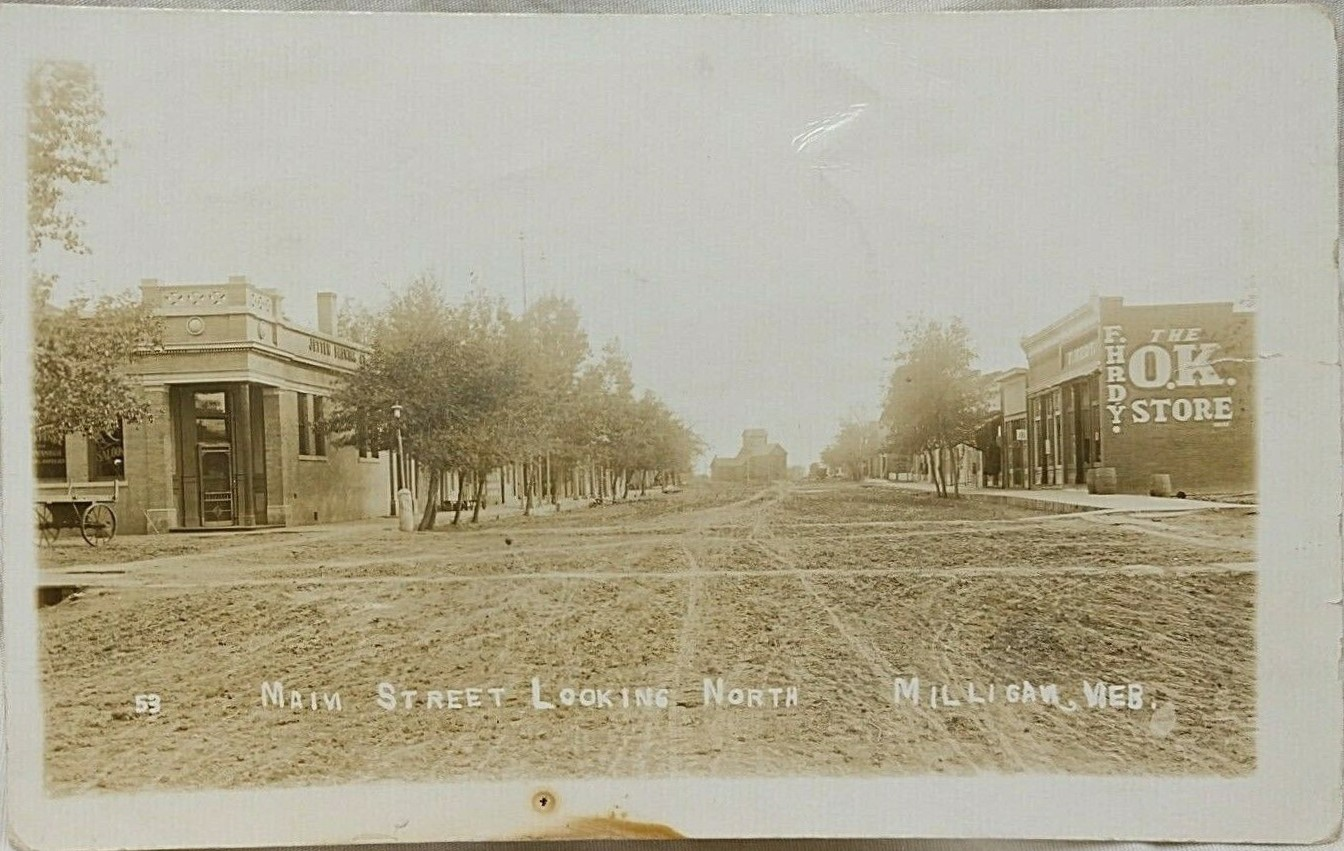
Main Street of Milligan, Nebraska is seen in this postcard mailed in 1912

== Geography ==
According to the United States Census Bureau, the village has a total area of 0.24 square miles (0.62 km^{2}), all land.

== Demographics ==
Historical population
Census	Pop.	Note	%±
1890	184		—
1900	283		53.8%
1910	336		18.7%
1920	418		24.4%
1930	412		−1.4%
1940	392		−4.9%
1950	367		−6.4%
1960	323		−12.0%
1970	319		−1.2%
1980	332		4.1%
1990	328		−1.2%
2000	315		−4.0%
2010	285		−9.5%
2020	244		−14.4%
2021 (est.)	241	▼	−1.2%
U.S. Decennial Census

=== 2010 census ===
At the 2010 census there were 285 people, 129 households, and 81 families in the village. The population density was 1,187.5 inhabitants per square mile (458.5/km^{2}). There were 170 housing units at an average density of 708.3 per square mile (273.5/km^{2}). The racial makup of the village was 97.5% White, 0.4% Native American, 0.4% Asian, 0.7% from other races, and 1.1% from two or more races. Hispanic or Latino people of any race were 1.1%.

Of the 129 households 24.0% had children under the age of 18 living with them, 51.2% were married couples living together, 3.1% had a female householder with no husband present, 8.5% had a male householder with no wife present, and 37.2% were non-families. 33.3% of households were one person and 18.6% were one person aged 65 or older. The average household size was 2.21 and the average family size was 2.79.

The median age in the village was 46.8 years. 22.5% of residents were under the age of 18; 5.6% were between the ages of 18 and 24; 19.3% were from 25 to 44; 27.1% were from 45 to 64; and 25.6% were 65 or older. The gender makeup of the village was 51.6% male and 48.4% female.

=== 2000 census ===
At the 2000 census there were 315 people, 149 households, and 77 families in the village. The population density was 1,353.3 inhabitants per square mile (522.5/km^{2}). There were 181 housing units at an average density of 777.6 per square mile (300.2/km^{2}). The racial makup of the village was 98.10% White, 0.95% Native American, and 0.95% from two or more races. Hispanic or Latino people of any race were 0.32%.

Of the 149 households 26.8% had children under the age of 18 living with them, 41.6% were married couples living together, 6.0% had a female householder with no husband present, and 47.7% were non-families. 44.3% of households were one person and 27.5% were one person aged 65 or older. The average household size was 2.11 and the average family size was 2.94.

The age distribution was 26.3% under the age of 18, 5.4% from 18 to 24, 25.1% from 25 to 44, 15.9% from 45 to 64, and 27.3% 65 or older. The median age was 42 years. For every 100 females, there were 84.2 males. For every 100 females age 18 and over, there were 81.3 males.

As of 2000 the median income for a household in the village was $24,327, and the median family income was $27,727. Males had a median income of $21,719 versus $22,500 for females. The per capita income for the village was $12,654. About 19.7% of families and 18.1% of the population were below the poverty line, including 18.5% of those under age 18 and 18.1% of those age 65 or over.

== Education ==
Milligan and the neighboring villages of Exeter and Friend make up part of the Exeter-Milligan-Friend School District. The Exeter-Milligan-Friend school district was formed in 2025. From 2002 to 2025, Milligan was part of the Exeter-Milligan School District. Prior to the 2002 Exeter-Milligan consolidation, Milligan Public School was a K-12 school district serving the community.

== Milligan Auditorium ==
The Cesko-narodni sin-Milligan Auditorium was constructed in 1929. It serves as a meeting hall in the Czech community, and was added to the National Register of Historic Places in 1996.

== Notable people ==
- Eddie Brown, baseball player
- Jeanne Combs, Nebraska legislator
