= Momence Township, Fillmore County, Nebraska =

Momence Township
- Township
- Location in Fillmore County
- Coordinates: 40°28′47″N 097°45′58″W
- Country: United States
- State: Nebraska
- County: Fillmore

Area
  - Total: 36.17 sq mi (93.67 km^{2})
  - Land: 36.17 sq mi (93.67 km^{2})
  - Water: 0 sq mi (0 km^{2}) 0%
- Elevation: 1,670 ft (509 m)

Population (2020)
  - Total: 63 ▼
  - Density: 1.7/sq mi (0.67/km^{2})
- Time zone: MST
- GNIS feature ID: 0838142

Momence Township is one of fifteen townships in Fillmore County, Nebraska, United States. The population was 63 at the 2020 census.

== See also ==
- County government in Nebraska
