= Liberty Township, Clay County, Missouri =

Township in Clay County, Missouri, U.S.

Liberty Township
- Township
- Interactive map of Liberty Township
- Coordinates: 39°15′36″N 94°25′31″W
- Country: United States
- State: Missouri
- County: Clay

Area
  - Total: 71.73 sq mi (185.8 km^{2})
  - Land: 71.45 sq mi (185.1 km^{2})
  - Water: 0.28 sq mi (0.73 km^{2}) 0.39%
- Elevation: 912 ft (278 m)

Population (2020)
  - Total: 66,685
  - Density: 933.3/sq mi (360.3/km^{2})
- FIPS code: 29-04742050
- GNIS feature ID: 766508

Liberty Township is a township in Clay County, Missouri, United States. At the 2020 census, its population was 66,685.

Liberty Township was erected in the 1820s, taking its name from Liberty, Missouri.
