= Liberty Township, Barry County, Missouri =

Liberty Township
- Township
- Coordinates: 36°41′58″N 094°00′55″W
- Country: United States
- State: Missouri
- County: Barry

Area
  - Total: 45.15 sq mi (116.95 km^{2})
  - Land: 45.15 sq mi (116.95 km^{2})
  - Water: 0 sq mi (0 km^{2}) 0%
- Elevation: 1,463 ft (446 m)

Population (2000)
  - Total: 1,105
  - Density: 24/sq mi (9.4/km^{2})
- FIPS code: 29-41942
- GNIS feature ID: 0766258

Liberty Township is one of twenty-five townships in Barry County, Missouri, United States. As of the 2000 census, its population was 1,105.

Liberty Township was established in 1858, and named for the American ideal of liberty.

== Geography ==
Liberty Township covers an area of 45.16 square miles (117.0 km^{2}) and contains no incorporated settlements. It contains five cemeteries: Chitwood, Concord, Creason, Packwood and Vineyard.

The stream of Talbert Branch runs through this township.
