= Liberty Township, Cole County, Missouri =

Inactive township in the US state of Missouri

Coordinates: 38.5192°N 92.0747°W

Liberty Township is an inactive township in Cole County, in the U.S. state of Missouri.

Liberty Township was erected in the 1820s, taking its name from Liberty, Missouri.

Liberty Township most likely was named for the American ideal of liberty.
