= Liberty Township, Marion County, Missouri =

Township in Marion County, Missouri, U.S.

Coordinates: 39.8028°N 91.4803°W

Liberty Township is an inactive township in Marion County, in the U.S. state of Missouri. It was established in 1827.
