= Liberty Township, Washington County, Missouri =

Township in Washington County, Missouri, U.S.

Coordinates: 38.0050°N 90.9125°W

Liberty Township is an inactive township in Washington County, in the U.S. state of Missouri.

Liberty Township was erected in 1852.
