= Zapadni Cesko-Bratrska Jednota =

Zapadni Cesko-Bratrska Jednota or Západní Česko-Bratrská Jednota, also known as ZCBJ or ZČBJ, was a Czech-language newspaper in the United States. It was founded and published by Jan Rosický (1845–1910).

== See also ==
- Czech-Slovak Protective Society
