= Liberty Township, Saline County, Missouri =

Township in Saline County, Missouri, U.S.

Coordinates: 38.9972°N 93.2925°W

Liberty Township is an inactive township in Saline County, in the U.S. state of Missouri.

Liberty Township was erected in 1871, and named for the American concept of liberty.
