= Shickley, Nebraska =

- Village
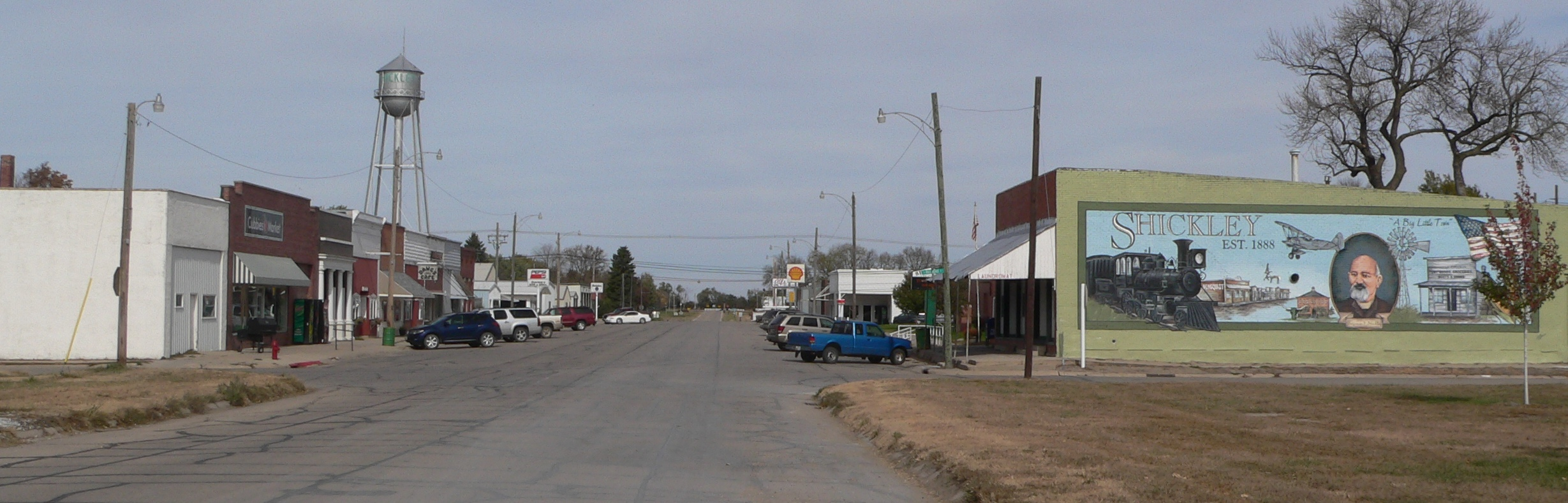
- Downtown Shickley

- Location of Shickley, Nebraska

- Location within Nebraska Location within the United States
- Coordinates: 40°24′59″N 97°43′27″W
- Country: United States
- State: Nebraska
- County: Fillmore
- Township: Bryant

Area
  - Total: 0.31 sq mi (0.79 km^{2})
  - Land: 0.31 sq mi (0.79 km^{2})
  - Water: 0 sq mi (0.00 km^{2})
- Elevation: 1,650 ft (500 m)

Population (2020)
  - Total: 343
  - Estimate (2021): 343
  - Density: 1,100/sq mi (430/km^{2})
- Time zone: UTC-6 (Central (CST))
  - Summer (DST): UTC-5 (CDT)
- ZIP code: 68436
- Area code: 402
- FIPS code: 31-45085
- GNIS feature ID: 2399807
- Website: www.biglittletown.us

Shickley is a village in Fillmore County, Nebraska, United States. The population was 343 at the 2020 census.

== History ==
Shickley was established in the 1880s when the Burlington and Missouri River Railroad was extended to that point.

== Geography ==
According to the United States Census Bureau, the village has a total area of 0.30 square miles (0.78 km^{2}), all land.

== Demographics ==
Historical population
Census	Pop.	Note	%±
1890	307		—
1900	372		21.2%
1910	429		15.3%
1920	396		−7.7%
1930	389		−1.8%
1940	342		−12.1%
1950	316		−7.6%
1960	371		17.4%
1970	385		3.8%
1980	413		7.3%
1990	360		−12.8%
2000	376		4.4%
2010	341		−9.3%
2020	347		1.8%
2021 (est.)	343	▼	−1.2%
U.S. Decennial Census

=== 2010 census ===
As of the census of 2010, there were 341 people, 152 households, and 102 families living in the village. The population density was 1,136.7 inhabitants per square mile (438.9/km^{2}). There were 163 housing units at an average density of 543.3 per square mile (209.8/km^{2}). The racial makeup of the village was 98.5% White, 0.3% African American, 0.3% from other races, and 0.9% from two or more races. Hispanic or Latino of any race were 0.6% of the population.

There were 152 households, of which 22.4% had children under the age of 18 living with them, 60.5% were married couples living together, 4.6% had a female householder with no husband present, 2.0% had a male householder with no wife present, and 32.9% were non-families. 29.6% of all households were made up of individuals, and 18.4% had someone living alone who was 65 years of age or older. The average household size was 2.24 and the average family size was 2.79.

The median age in the village was 47.9 years. 20.2% of residents were under the age of 18; 5.4% were between the ages of 18 and 24; 19.4% were from 25 to 44; 30.8% were from 45 to 64; and 24.3% were 65 years of age or older. The gender makeup of the village was 49.3% male and 50.7% female.

=== 2000 census ===
As of the census of 2000, there were 376 people, 154 households, and 111 families living in the village. The population density was 1,280.2 inhabitants per square mile (494.3/km^{2}). There were 170 housing units at an average density of 578.8 per square mile (223.5/km^{2}). The racial makeup of the village was 97.87% White, 0.27% African American, 0.27% Pacific Islander, 1.33% from other races, and 0.27% from two or more races. Hispanic or Latino of any race were 1.60% of the population.

There were 154 households, out of which 35.1% had children under the age of 18 living with them, 65.6% were married couples living together, 3.2% had a female householder with no husband present, and 27.9% were non-families. 24.7% of all households were made up of individuals, and 16.9% had someone living alone who was 65 years of age or older. The average household size was 2.44 and the average family size was 2.92.

In the village, the population was spread out, with 26.6% under the age of 18, 5.1% from 18 to 24, 24.2% from 25 to 44, 22.3% from 45 to 64, and 21.8% who were 65 years of age or older. The median age was 42 years. For every 100 females, there were 104.3 males. For every 100 females age 18 and over, there were 101.5 males.

As of 2000 the median income for a household in the village was $43,125, and the median income for a family was $49,750. Males had a median income of $36,875 versus $20,000 for females. The per capita income for the village was $19,257. About 0.9% of families and 3.2% of the population were below the poverty line, including 3.2% of those under age 18 and 1.3% of those age 65 or over.
