= Liberty Township, Crawford County, Missouri =

Township in Crawford County, Missouri, U.S.

Coordinates: 38.060675°N 91.197334°W

Liberty Township is an inactive township in Crawford County, in the U.S. state of Missouri.

It was named for the American principle of liberty.
