= Liberty Township, Cape Girardeau County, Missouri =

Township in the U.S. state of Missouri

Liberty Township
- Township
- Coordinates: 37°15′47″N 089°50′20″W
- Country: United States
- State: Missouri
- County: Cape Girardeau

Area
  - Total: 25.58 sq mi (66.26 km^{2})
  - Land: 25.34 sq mi (65.63 km^{2})
  - Water: 0.24 sq mi (0.62 km^{2}) 0.94%
- Elevation: 407 ft (124 m)

Population (2000)
  - Total: 483
  - Density: 19/sq mi (7.4/km^{2})
- FIPS code: 29-42014
- GNIS feature ID: 0766400

Liberty Township is one of ten townships in Cape Girardeau County, Missouri, USA. As of the 2000 census, its population was 483.

Liberty Township was established in 1848, and named for the American principle of liberty.

== Geography ==
Liberty Township covers an area of 25.58 square miles (66.3 km^{2}) and contains no incorporated settlements. Known cemeteries include Barks Baptist Chapel, Borneman, Crump, Passover/Proffer, Proffer 1, Spivey/Dunn, Stroder 1 and 2, Stroderville.

The streams of Gizzard Creek and Hog Creek run through this township.
