= Liberty Township, Knox County, Missouri =

Inactive township in the American state of Missouri

Coordinates: 40.1722°N 92.1161°W

Liberty Township is an inactive township in Knox County, in the U.S. state of Missouri.

Liberty Township was established in 1872, and named for the American principle of liberty.
