= Liberty Township, Grundy County, Missouri =

Township in the American state of Missouri

Coordinates: 40.15637°N 93.4331°W

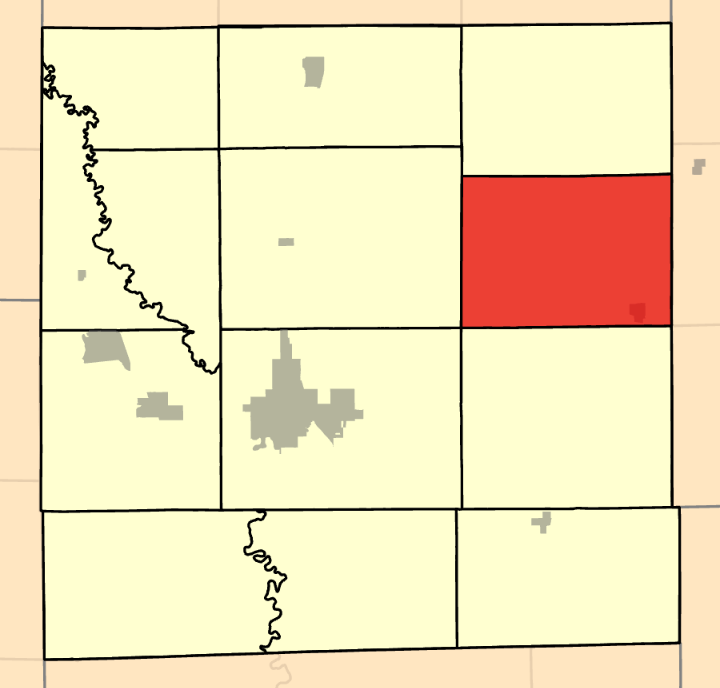

Liberty Township is a township in Grundy County, in the U.S. state of Missouri.

The first settlement at Liberty Township was made in the 1830s.
