= Liberty Township, Stoddard County, Missouri =

Township in the American state of Missouri

Coordinates: 36.7181°N 90.0225°W

Liberty Township is a township in Stoddard County, in the U.S. state of Missouri.

Liberty Township was erected in 1835.
