= Liberty Township, Iron County, Missouri =

Township in Iron County, Missouri, U.S.

Coordinates: 37.4653°N 90.6614°W

Liberty Township is an inactive township in Iron County, in the U.S. state of Missouri.

Liberty Township was established in 1857, and named for the American concept of liberty.
