= Liberty Township, Madison County, Missouri =

Inactive township in the US state of Missouri

Coordinates: 37.4014°N 90.5100°W

Liberty Township is an inactive township in Madison County, in the U.S. state of Missouri.

Liberty Township was established in 1841.
