= Liberty Township, Pulaski County, Missouri =

Township in Pulaski County, Missouri, U.S.

Coordinates: 37.8181°N 92.3522°W

Liberty Township is an inactive township in Pulaski County, in the U.S. state of Missouri.

Liberty Township was erected in 1833, and named after the American concept of liberty.
