= Liberty Township, Daviess County, Missouri =

Township in Daviess County, Missouri, U.S.

Liberty Township
- Township
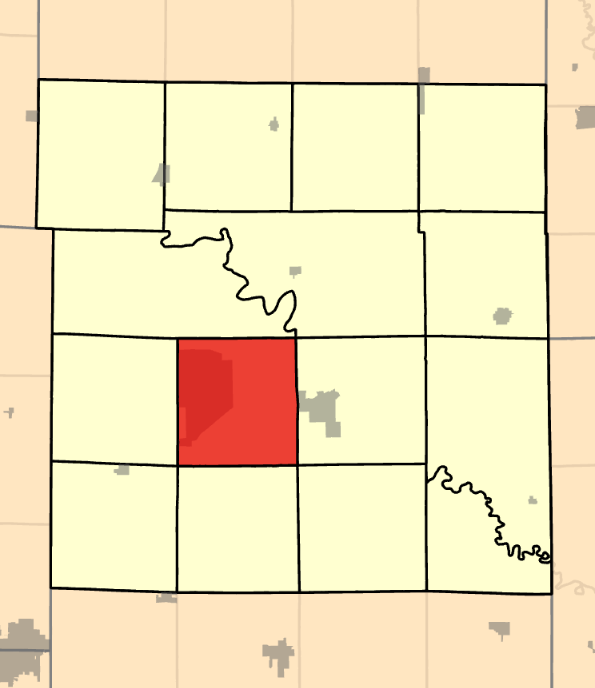
- Coordinates: 39°55′24″N 94°02′02″W
- Country: United States
- State: Missouri
- County: Daviess

Area
  - Total: 34.03 sq mi (88.1 km^{2})
  - Land: 32.94 sq mi (85.3 km^{2})
  - Water: 1.09 sq mi (2.8 km^{2}) 3.2%
- Elevation: 974 ft (297 m)

Population (2020)
  - Total: 865
  - Density: 26.3/sq mi (10.2/km^{2})
- FIPS code: 29-06142104
- GNIS feature ID: 766583

Liberty Township is a township in Daviess County, Missouri, United States. At the 2020 census, its population was 865.

Liberty Township was established in 1869.
