= Liberty Township, Sullivan County, Missouri =

Township in Sullivan County, Missouri, U.S.

Coordinates: 40.2553°N 93.2822°W

Liberty Township is a township in Sullivan County, in the U.S. state of Missouri, established in 1845.
