= Liberty Township, Schuyler County, Missouri =

Township in Schuyler County, Missouri, U.S.

Coordinates: 40.5469°N 92.5119°W

Liberty Township is an inactive township in Schuyler County, in the U.S. state of Missouri.

Liberty Township was erected in 1843, located centrally in the northern half of the county.
