= Liberty Township, Putnam County, Missouri =

Township in Putnam County, Missouri, U.S.

Coordinates: 40.50°N 92.77°W

Liberty Township is a township in northeastern Putnam County, Missouri.

The organization date and origin of the name of Liberty Township is unknown.
