= Liberty Township, St. Francois County, Missouri =

Inactive township in the US state of Missouri

Coordinates: 37.6792°N 90.2978°W

Liberty Township is an inactive township in St. Francois County, in the U.S. state of Missouri.

Liberty Township was erected in 1821, and named for the American concept of liberty.
