= Liberty Township, Phelps County, Missouri =

Inactive township in the US state of Missouri

Coordinates: 37.8228°N 91.9544°W

Liberty Township is an inactive township in Phelps County, in the U.S. state of Missouri.

Liberty Township was named for the American concept of liberty.
