= Geneva, Nebraska =

- City
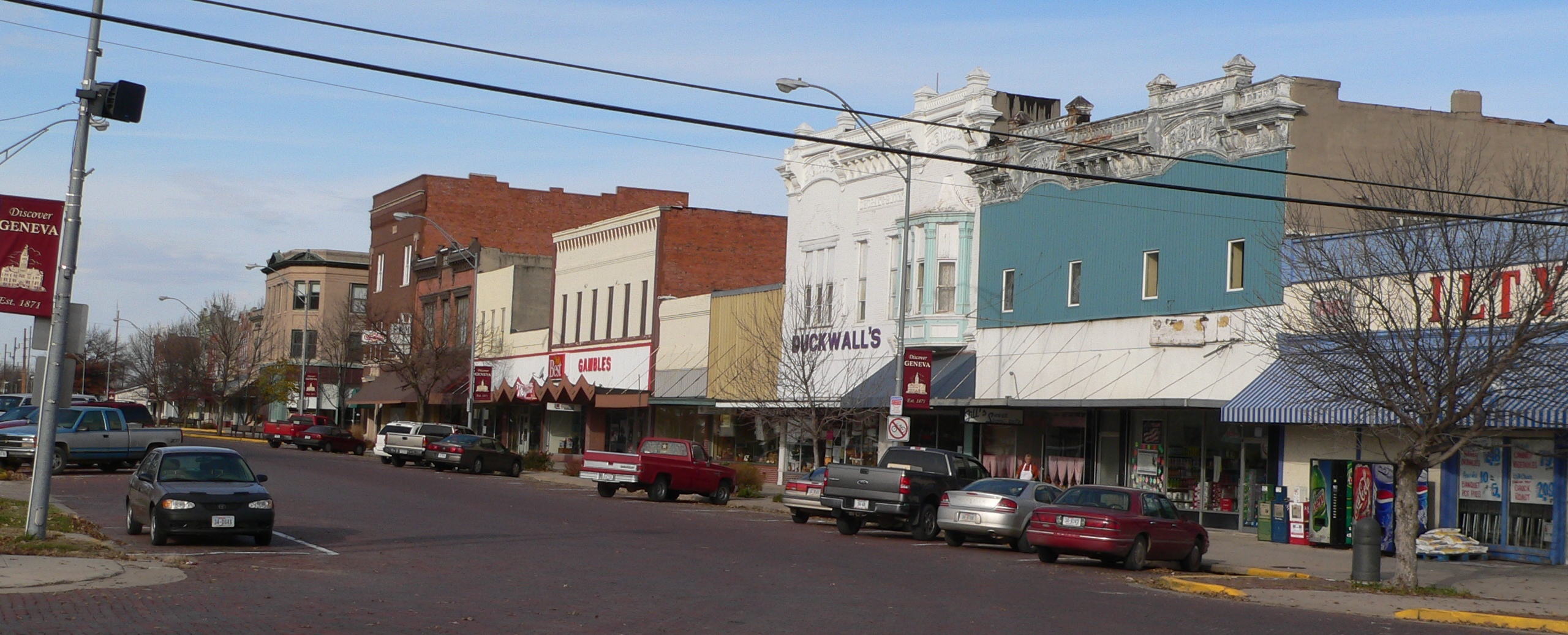
- G Street in downtown (2009)

- Location of Geneva, Nebraska
- Coordinates: 40°31′50″N 97°35′51″W
- Country: United States
- State: Nebraska
- County: Fillmore

Area
  - Total: 2.28 sq mi (5.91 km^{2})
  - Land: 2.28 sq mi (5.91 km^{2})
  - Water: 0 sq mi (0.00 km^{2})
- Elevation: 1,637 ft (499 m)

Population (2020)
  - Total: 2,136
  - Density: 935.6/sq mi (361.24/km^{2})
- Time zone: UTC-6 (Central (CST))
  - Summer (DST): UTC-5 (CDT)
- ZIP code: 68361
- Area code: 402
- FIPS code: 31-18405
- GNIS feature ID: 2394878
- Website: www.genevane.org

Geneva is a city in and the county seat of Fillmore County, Nebraska, United States. As of the 2020 census, Geneva had a population of 2,136.

== History ==
Geneva was founded in 1871. It was named after Geneva, in Switzerland, perhaps via Geneva, New York.

== Government ==
Geneva uses a city council consisting of six members that serve four-year terms. As of April 2023, the current mayor of Geneva is Cody Lightwine.

== Geography ==
According to the United States Census Bureau, the city has a total area of 2.04 square miles (5.28 km^{2}), all land.

The city serves as the Fillmore County seat and is home to the historic Fillmore County Courthouse. This two-story brick building was built in 1894 and has a prominent three-story clock tower which was installed by jeweler W.P. McCall in 1909. The courthouse underwent a multimillion-dollar restoration and conservation project and is listed on the National Register of Historic Places.

Geneva is located approximately 24 miles (39 km) south of Interstate 80 on U.S. Route 81, which is a part of the Pan American Highway, connecting Canada to Mexico.

=== Climate ===
On July 15, 1934, Geneva experienced the highest recorded temperature in Nebraska state history at 118 °F (47.8 °C); it shares this record with Minden and Hartington.

Climate data for Geneva, Nebraska (1991–2020 normals, extremes 1893–present)
Month	Jan	Feb	Mar	Apr	May	Jun	Jul	Aug	Sep	Oct	Nov	Dec	Year
Record high °F (°C)	76 (24)	81 (27)	92 (33)	98 (37)	102 (39)	109 (43)	118 (48)	113 (45)	108 (42)	98 (37)	85 (29)	80 (27)	118 (48)
Mean maximum °F (°C)	59.0 (15.0)	64.3 (17.9)	76.4 (24.7)	85.1 (29.5)	91.1 (32.8)	95.0 (35.0)	97.0 (36.1)	95.4 (35.2)	92.7 (33.7)	85.6 (29.8)	73.2 (22.9)	60.1 (15.6)	98.4 (36.9)
Mean daily maximum °F (°C)	36.5 (2.5)	41.2 (5.1)	54.0 (12.2)	65.1 (18.4)	74.0 (23.3)	83.5 (28.6)	86.5 (30.3)	84.5 (29.2)	79.0 (26.1)	66.6 (19.2)	51.4 (10.8)	39.2 (4.0)	63.5 (17.5)
Daily mean °F (°C)	26.7 (−2.9)	30.8 (−0.7)	41.9 (5.5)	52.6 (11.4)	62.8 (17.1)	72.7 (22.6)	76.2 (24.6)	74.2 (23.4)	67.2 (19.6)	54.7 (12.6)	40.7 (4.8)	29.9 (−1.2)	52.5 (11.4)
Mean daily minimum °F (°C)	16.9 (−8.4)	20.5 (−6.4)	29.8 (−1.2)	40.0 (4.4)	51.6 (10.9)	61.9 (16.6)	65.9 (18.8)	63.9 (17.7)	55.4 (13.0)	42.7 (5.9)	30.0 (−1.1)	20.6 (−6.3)	41.6 (5.3)
Mean minimum °F (°C)	−4.9 (−20.5)	−0.3 (−17.9)	9.0 (−12.8)	23.7 (−4.6)	36.9 (2.7)	49.7 (9.8)	55.7 (13.2)	53.4 (11.9)	39.6 (4.2)	24.6 (−4.1)	12.0 (−11.1)	0.5 (−17.5)	−8.7 (−22.6)
Record low °F (°C)	−28 (−33)	−32 (−36)	−17 (−27)	9 (−13)	20 (−7)	36 (2)	41 (5)	38 (3)	23 (−5)	5 (−15)	−6 (−21)	−26 (−32)	−32 (−36)
Average precipitation inches (mm)	0.57 (14)	0.58 (15)	1.35 (34)	2.34 (59)	4.93 (125)	4.06 (103)	3.60 (91)	3.65 (93)	2.86 (73)	2.15 (55)	1.21 (31)	0.88 (22)	28.18 (716)
Average snowfall inches (cm)	5.0 (13)	6.7 (17)	2.4 (6.1)	0.7 (1.8)	0.0 (0.0)	0.0 (0.0)	0.0 (0.0)	0.0 (0.0)	0.0 (0.0)	0.4 (1.0)	1.1 (2.8)	4.9 (12)	21.2 (54)
Average precipitation days (≥ 0.01 in)	3.7	3.5	5.7	7.2	10.3	8.5	7.6	7.4	5.7	5.5	3.7	3.3	72.1
Average snowy days (≥ 0.1 in)	2.5	2.6	1.2	0.4	0.0	0.0	0.0	0.0	0.0	0.3	0.8	1.8	9.6
Source: NOAA

== Demographics ==
Historical population
Census	Pop.	Note	%±
1880	376		—
1890	1,580		320.2%
1900	1,534		−2.9%
1910	1,741		13.5%
1920	1,768		1.6%
1930	1,662		−6.0%
1940	1,888		13.6%
1950	2,031		7.6%
1960	2,352		15.8%
1970	2,275		−3.3%
1980	2,400		5.5%
1990	2,310		−3.7%
2000	2,226		−3.6%
2010	2,217		−0.4%
2020	2,136		−3.7%
U.S. Decennial Census; 2012 Estimate

=== 2020 census ===
As of the 2020 census, Geneva had a population of 2,136. The median age was 44.3 years. 23.2% of residents were under the age of 18 and 26.4% of residents were 65 years of age or older. For every 100 females there were 93.5 males, and for every 100 females age 18 and over there were 88.9 males age 18 and over.

0.0% of residents lived in urban areas, while 100.0% lived in rural areas.

There were 917 households in Geneva, of which 25.6% had children under the age of 18 living in them. Of all households, 48.9% were married-couple households, 18.9% were households with a male householder and no spouse or partner present, and 27.5% were households with a female householder and no spouse or partner present. About 36.3% of all households were made up of individuals and 20.4% had someone living alone who was 65 years of age or older.

There were 1,048 housing units, of which 12.5% were vacant. The homeowner vacancy rate was 4.2% and the rental vacancy rate was 11.7%.

Racial composition as of the 2020 census
Race	Number	Percent
White	1,981	92.7%
Black or African American	10	0.5%
American Indian and Alaska Native	10	0.5%
Asian	2	0.1%
Native Hawaiian and Other Pacific Islander	1	0.0%
Some other race	25	1.2%
Two or more races	107	5.0%
Hispanic or Latino (of any race)	77	3.6%

=== 2010 census ===
As of the census of 2010, there were 2,217 people, 926 households, and 585 families living in the city. The population density was 1,086.8 inhabitants per square mile (419.6/km^{2}). There were 1,061 housing units at an average density of 520.1 per square mile (200.8/km^{2}). The racial makeup of the city was 95.9% White, 1.3% African American, 0.9% Native American, 0.7% from other races, and 1.2% from two or more races. Hispanic or Latino of any race were 3.1% of the population.

There were 926 households, of which 27.9% had children under the age of 18 living with them, 53.2% were married couples living together, 7.0% had a female householder with no husband present, 2.9% had a male householder with no wife present, and 36.8% were non-families. 34.4% of all households were made up of individuals, and 19.5% had someone living alone who was 65 years of age or older. The average household size was 2.25 and the average family size was 2.87.

The median age in the city was 44.3 years. 26.2% of residents were under the age of 18; 5.2% were between the ages of 18 and 24; 19.4% were from 25 to 44; 24.6% were from 45 to 64; and 24.4% were 65 years of age or older. The gender makeup of the city was 46.5% male and 53.5% female.

=== 2000 census ===
As of the census of 2000, there were 2,226 people, 957 households, and 618 families living in the city. The population density was 1,486.5 inhabitants per square mile (573.9/km^{2}). There were 1,050 housing units at an average density of 701.2 per square mile (270.7/km^{2}). The racial makeup of the city was 99.01% White, 0.04% African American, 0.27% Native American, 0.45% from other races, and 0.22% from two or more races. Hispanic or Latino of any race were 0.81% of the population.

There were 957 households, out of which 27.3% had children under the age of 18 living with them, 55.7% were married couples living together, 6.2% had a female householder with no husband present, and 35.4% were non-families. 33.0% of all households were made up of individuals, and 18.4% had someone living alone who was 65 years of age or older. The average household size was 2.24 and the average family size was 2.83.

In the city, the population was spread out, with 23.1% under the age of 18, 5.1% from 18 to 24, 23.2% from 25 to 44, 23.2% from 45 to 64, and 25.4% who were 65 years of age or older. The median age was 44 years. For every 100 females, there were 89.1 males. For every 100 females age 18 and over, there were 81.4 males.

As of 2000 the median income for a household in the city was $32,500, and the median income for a family was $40,096. Males had a median income of $30,357 versus $17,534 for females. The per capita income for the city was $18,349. About 2.4% of families and 5.6% of the population were below the poverty line, including 3.2% of those under age 18 and 7.1% of those age 65 or over.

== Education ==
Fillmore Central Elementary and High School are the public schools in Geneva.

Grace Lutheran Elementary School is a Christian school of the Wisconsin Evangelical Lutheran Synod in Geneva.

== Controversies ==
Geneva police abrupty resigned in 2005 after alleged wrongdoings by its mayor, Rod Norrie. The police chief and two of his officers resigned. The resignations resulted from an investigation by State Police that had ended without finding wrongdoing.

== Notable people ==
- H. H. Atherton, Minnesota state senator
- Kate Barnard, first woman elected to statewide office in Oklahoma
- Maggie Malone, collegiate javelin throw record-holder and Olympic athlete
- Terry Murrell, president of Western Iowa Tech Community College
- John E. Nelson, member of the Nebraska Legislature
- Charles H. Sloan, U.S. representative from Nebraska
- Robert B. Wilson, economist and Nobel Memorial Prize in Economic Sciences recipient
- Jai Steadman, college football coach
