= Occoneechee =

Occoneechee or Occaneechi may refer to:

== People and culture ==
- Occaneechi people
- Occaneechi Band of the Saponi Nation
- Occaneechi language

== Geography ==
- Occoneechee Mountain State Natural Area, North Carolina
- Occoneechee State Park, Virginia
- Occoneechee Farm, in Hillsborough, North Carolina
- Occoneechee Speedway, in Hillsborough, North Carolina

== Other ==
- Occoneechee Council of the Boy Scouts of America
- Occoneechee Plantation in Mecklenburg County, Virginia; listed in the Virginia Landmarks Register

== See also ==
- Oconee (disambiguation)
