= St. Francis High School (Humphrey, Nebraska) =

Private coeducational school in Humphrey, Nebraska, United States

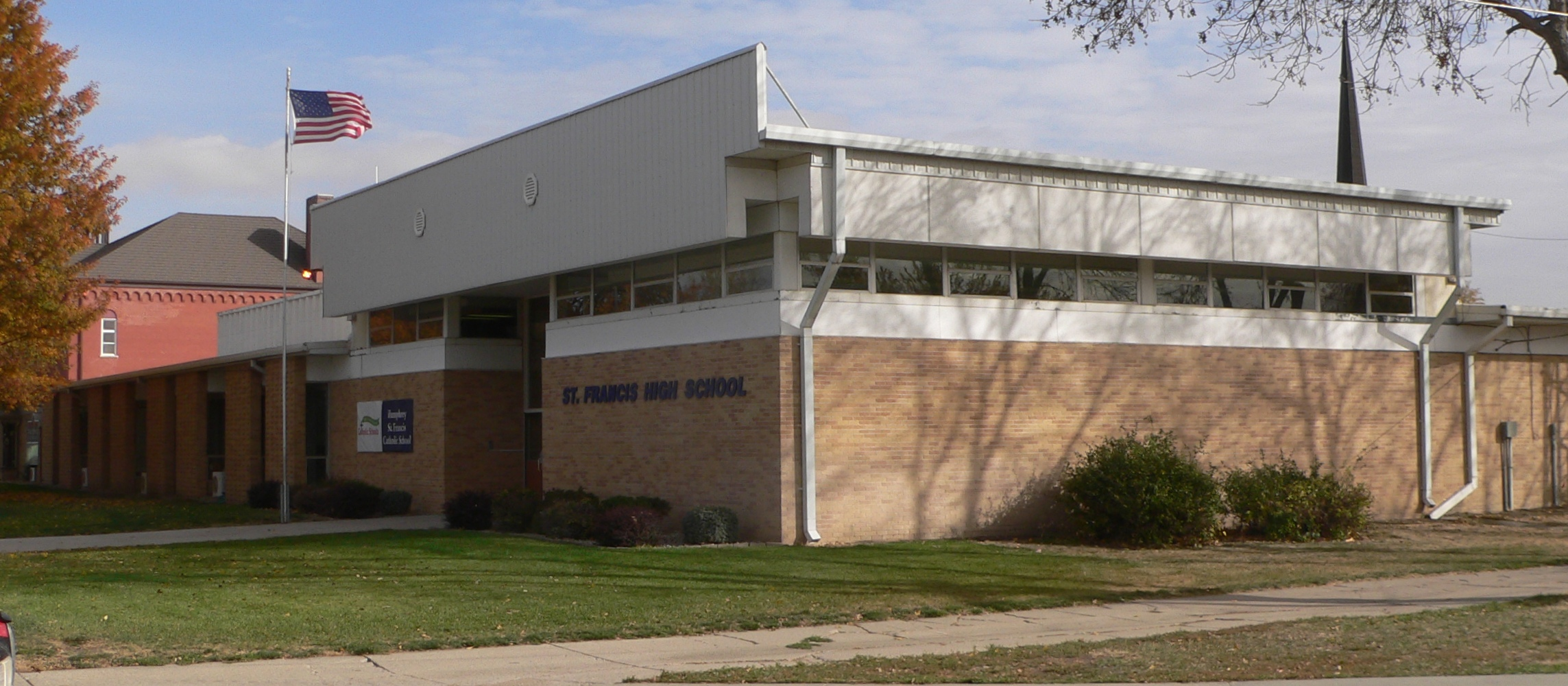

Location
- 300 South 7th Street; Humphrey, (Platte County), Nebraska 68642; United States
- Coordinates: 41°41′23″N 97°29′21″W

Information
- Type: Private, coeducational
- Religious affiliation: Roman Catholic
- Principal: Jennifer Dunn
- Grades: 9–12
- Colors: Royal blue and white
- Team name: Flyers
- Website: St. Francis High School

St. Francis High School was a private, Roman Catholic high school in Humphrey, Nebraska, United States. It was located in the Roman Catholic Archdiocese of Omaha. In early 2023, the Roman Catholic Archdiocese of Omaha announced that St. Francis High School and nearby Lindsay Holy Family High School would close via merger. The merger was completed by the beginning of the 2024-25 school year, and the new school, known as Archangels Catholic High School, occupies the former St. Francis High School site in Humphrey, Nebraska.

== Athletics ==
St. Francis was a member of the Nebraska School Activities Association. St. Francis won the following NSAA State Championships:

- Boys' football - 1995, 1996, 2009, 2015, 2019
- Girls' volleyball - 2000, 2004, 2005
- Boys' basketball - 1941, 1943, 1990, 1992, 1994, 2006, 2016, 2026
- Girls' basketball - 2005, 2006, 2007, 2021
- Boys' baseball - 1954, 1955
- Boys' golf - 1998, 1999
- Girls' track and field - 2006
