= Scouting in North Carolina =

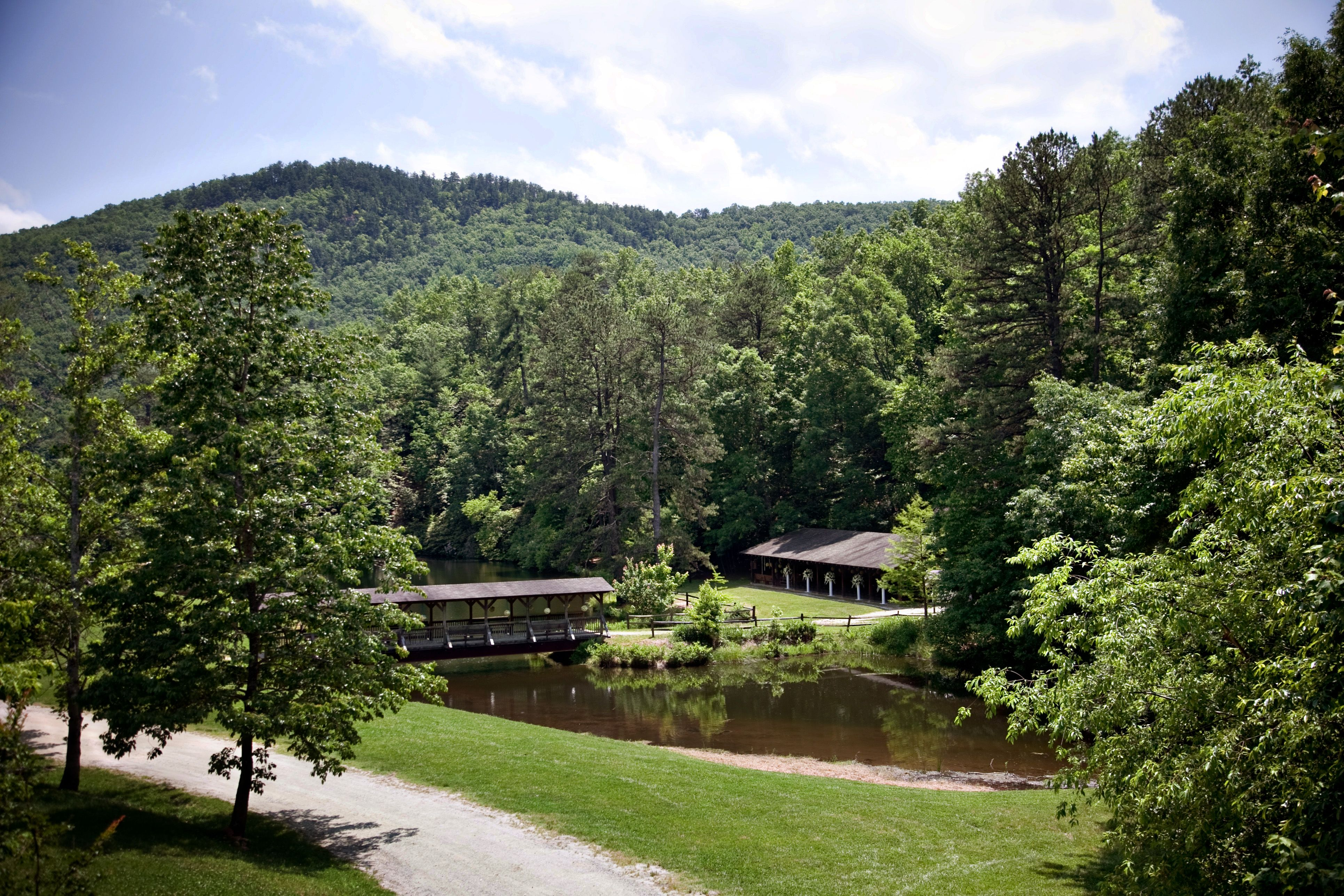
- Camp Raven Knob

Scouting in North Carolina has a long history, from the 1910s to the present day, serving thousands of youth in programs that suit the environment in which they live.

== Early history (1910-1950) ==
The Boy Scout program began in England under the leadership of Robert Baden-Powell. Baden-Powell gained fame in Britain through his leadership of British troops during the siege of Mafeking during the Boer War in South Africa in 1899–1900. Following this event a military training manual he wrote called "Aids to Scouting" gained popularity amongst boys in Britain. In the early 1900s Baden-Powell began developing the concepts of scouting and he put his theories to the test during the summer of 1907. He took a group of 22 boys to Brownsea Island where he conducted the first Boy Scout camp. He divided the boys into four groups and established the "patrol method". In 1908 Baden-Powell published "Scouting for Boys", the first Boy Scout handbook.

Scouting came to the United States a short time later. There were already boy organizations in the US under the leadership of Daniel Carter Beard (Sons of Daniel Boone), Ernest Thompson Seton (Woodcraft Indians) and the YMCA. Chicago publisher William D. Boyce learned about Scouting during a visit to London in 1909. A young boy assisted Mr. Boyce to his destination and declined a tip offered to him saying that he was a Scout. Boyce was impressed by the young man and visited the London headquarters of the Boy Scouts. He studied the British model and felt that boys in the US could benefit from this program. On February 8, 1910, the Boy Scouts of America (BSA) was incorporated. A National Office was established in New York City and James E. West was hired to lead the new organization.

Boy Scout troops were formed in North Carolina as early as 1910. Troops were formed at schools and churches in Greensboro, Raleigh, Burlington, Durham, Charlotte, Winston-Salem, and other communities. Adult volunteers in each area worked with boys in teaching outdoor skills, first aid, athletics, swimming, citizenship and leadership. These troops registered with the BSA and as communities established multiple Boy Scout troops the volunteers began seeking professional leadership. Boy Scout Councils were chartered through the BSA as "Scout Executives" were hired.

Initially, Scouting groups in the major cities formed councils. There was the Greensboro Area Council (1918), Winston-Salem Council (1919), Raleigh Council, and Durham Council. Over the next few years as Scouting spread throughout the counties the small councils consolidated and changed their names. By 1950 North Carolina was served by thirteen Boy Scout councils:

Council Name	Headquarters	Date Formed
Cape Fear Council	Wilmington	1930
Central NC Council	Albemarle	1937
Cherokee Council	Reidsville	1923
Daniel Boone Council	Asheville	1925
East Carolina Council	Kinston	1932
General Greene Council	Greensboro	1947
Mecklenburg County Council	Charlotte	1942
Occoneechee Council	Raleigh	1929
Old Hickory Council	Winston-Salem	1942
Piedmont Council	Gastonia	1924
Tidewater Council	Virginia Beach, VA	1935
Tuscarora Council	Goldsboro	1923
Uwharrie Council	High Point	1923

Camping was an emphasis for the councils from their formation. Each council purchased or leased land for establishing Boy Scout camps. During the summer each camp was open for several weeks with a trained staff of older boys and adults to teach the Scouts various Scouting skills. In the mid-1930s most councils began holding annual "camporees." These events were held over a weekend with Scouts camping by troop with their patrols competing and demonstrating various Scouting skills.

The Uwharrie, General Greene, and Cherokee councils would all later merge to form the Old North State Council, leaving the eleven councils still serving the state as of 2022.

== BSA Councils located in North Carolina ==
There are eleven Boy Scouts of America (BSA) councils in North Carolina. Ten of them exclusively cover North Carolina, while one includes communities in both Virginia and North Carolina.

=== Cape Fear Council ===
Cape Fear Council (#425)
- Owner: Boy Scouts of America
- Headquarters: Wilmington, North Carolina
- Country: United States
- Founded: 1989
- Website www.capefearcouncilbsa.org

The Cape Fear Council was founded in 1989 and serves the southeastern corner of North Carolina. The council offices are located in Wilmington.

==== History ====
The Wilmington Council (#425) was founded in 1916, changing its name to the New Hanover County Council (#425) in 1926. New Hanover County changed its name to the Cape Fear Area Council (#425) in 1930. The Cape Fear Area Council changed its name to the Cape Fear Council (#425) in 1989.

==== Organization ====
Districts

- Coastal: New Hanover and Pender counties.
- Lakes: Bladen, Brunswick, and Columbus counties.
- Lumber River: Hoke, Robeson, and Scotland counties.

==== Camps ====
The council operates two camp properties: Camp Bowers, which houses the annual BSA summer camp, and Camp John A. McNeil, which hosts events and programs for Cub Scouts. Both are located on the Cape Fear Scout Reservation near White Oak, North Carolina, and have sites available for year-round camping as well.

==== Order of the Arrow ====
The council is served by the Order of the Arrow through Klahican Lodge 331.

=== Central North Carolina Council ===
Central North Carolina Council (#416)
- Owner: Boy Scouts of America
- Headquarters: Albemarle, North Carolina
- Country: United States
- Founded: 1937
- Website www.centralncscouting.org

The Central North Carolina Council (#416) was founded in 1937. The council covers the south-central portion of North Carolina. The Council offices are located in Albemarle.

==== History ====
1917 saw the founding of the Concord Council, which folded the next year. The Charlotte Council (#416) was founded in 1915, changing its name to the Central North Carolina Council (#416) in 1937.

==== Organization ====
Districts

- Gold Rush District: Cabarrus and Rowan counties.
- Old Hickory District: Anson and Union counties.
- Uwharrie District: Montgomery, Richmond, and Stanly counties.

==== Camps ====
The council operates Camp Barnhardt, which houses the annual BSA summer camp and various programs throughout the year, including year-round camping opportunities. It is located on the William C. Cannon Scout Reservation, located between Badin and New London along Badin Lake.

==== Order of the Arrow ====
The council is served by the Order of the Arrow through Itibapishe iti Hollo Lodge 188.

=== Daniel Boone Council ===
Daniel Boone Council (#414)
- Owner: Boy Scouts of America
- Headquarters: Asheville, North Carolina
- Country: United States
- Founded: 1925
- Website www.danielboonecouncil.org

Founded in 1925, the Daniel Boone Council (#414) covers the western North Carolina. The council offices are located in Asheville.

==== History ====
The Asheville Council (#418) was founded in 1919, changing its name to the Buncombe County Council (#414) in 1922. Buncombe County changed its name to the Daniel Boone Council (#414) in 1925.

==== Organization ====
Districts

- Falling Waters District: Cherokee, Clay, Graham, Haywood, Jackson, Macon, and Swain counties.
- Looking Glass District: Henderson, Transylvania, and southern Buncombe counties.
- Mt. Mitchell District: Avery, Madison, Mitchell, Yancey, and northern Buncombe counties.

==== Camps ====
The council operates Camp Daniel Boone, which houses the annual BSA summer camp, Boonseboro Village, a living history museum operated by scouts, a high-adventure camp, and various programs throughout the year, including year-round camping opportunities. It is located in the mountains south of Canton, North Carolina.

==== Order of the Arrow ====
The council is served by the Order of the Arrow through Tsali Lodge 134.

=== East Carolina Council ===
East Carolina Council (#426)
- Owner: Boy Scouts of America
- Headquarters: Kinston, North Carolina
- Country: United States
- Founded: 1932
- Website www.eccbsa.org

The East Carolina Council was founded in 1932 and covers east-central North Carolina. The council offices are located in Kinston.

==== History ====
The Rocky Mount Council (#422) was founded in 1919, changing its name to the Tar Heel Area Council (#422) in 1923. The Tar Heel Area Council merged into the East Carolina Council (#426) in 1934. The Pamlico Council (#686) was founded in 1924, and merged into the Wilson County Council (#426) in 1930. The Neuse Council (#415) was founded in 1928, and merged into the Wilson County Council (#426) in 1930. The Wilson County Council (#426) was founded in 1924, changing its name to the East Carolina Council (#426) in 1932.

==== Organization ====
Districts

- Northern District: Bertie, Edgecombe, Halifax, Hertford, Nash, Northampton, and Wilson counties.
- Central District: Beaufort, Greene, Hyde, Lenoir, Martin, Pitt, Tyrrell, and Washington counties.
- Southern District: Carteret, Craven, Jones, Onslow, and Pamlico counties.

==== Camps ====
The council operates a number of BSA camp properties including the East Carolina Scout Reservation (Camp Boddie and Pamlico Sea Base) located in Blounts Creek, North Carolina, along the southern bank of the Pamlico River across from Little Washington, the Herbert C. Bonner Scout Reservation (Camp Bonner and Camp Hannah Bonner) located along the northern bank of the Pamlico, in Little Washington, Camp Charles, located near Bailey, North Carolina, and Camp Sam Hatcher, located along Bogue Sound near Morehead City. BSA Summer Camp is run through Camp Boddie, while Sea Scouts programs are run through Pamlico Sea Base. All of the other properties run periodic programs and are available for weekend camping.

==== Order of the Arrow ====
The council is served by the Order of the Arrow through Croatan Lodge 117.

=== Mecklenburg County Council ===
Mecklenburg County Council (#415)
- Owner: Boy Scouts of America
- Headquarters: Charlotte, North Carolina
- Country: United States
- Founded: 1942
- Website www.mccscouting.org

The Mecklenburg County Council serves Mecklenburg County, North Carolina. The offices are located in Charlotte.

==== History ====
The Charlotte Council (#415) was founded in 1940, changing its name to the Mecklenburg County Council (#415) in 1942.

==== Organization ====
Districts

- Apache District: Southwestern Mecklenburg County.
- Etowah District: Southeastern Mecklenburg County.
- Hornets Nest District: Northern Mecklenburg County.

==== Camps ====
It operates two camp facilities, locally Belk Scout Camp (Formerly Clear Creek Scout Camp) in Midland, North Carolina is available for weekend camping, and Camp Grimes at Mecklenburg Scout Reservation, located outside of the council near Marion, North Carolina, but owned by it, runs a summer camp and weekend programs as well.

==== Order of the Arrow ====
The council is served by the Order of the Arrow through Catawba Lodge 459.

=== Occoneechee Council ===
Occoneechee Council (#421)
- Owner: Boy Scouts of America
- Headquarters: Raleigh, North Carolina
- Country: United States
- Founded: 1929
- Website www.ocscouts.org

The Occoneechee Council was founded in 1929 and covers the Research Triangle and Sandhills regions in the central part of North Carolina. The council offices are located in Raleigh.

==== History ====
The Southern Pines Council (#423) was founded in 1919, closing in 1924. The Raleigh Council (#421) was founded in 1919, changing its name to the Wake County Council (#421) in 1925. The Durham County Council (#626) was founded in 1925. The Walter Hines Page Council (#423) was founded in 1924. In 1929, the Wake County, Durham County, and Walter Hines Page councils merged into the Occoneechee Council.

==== Organization ====
Districts

- Cardinal: Southern Wake County.
- Eno River: Chatham, Durham, Granville, Orange, and Vance counties.
- North Star: Franklin, Warren, and northern Wake County.
- Sandhills: Cumberland, Harnett, Lee, and Moore counties.

==== Camps ====
Occoneechee Scout Reservation, located in Moore County near Carthage houses Camp Durant, used for summer camping and Camp Reeves, which has more primitive facilities. Camp Campbell, located just across the NC-VA border on Kerr Lake near Clarksville, Virginia also features primitive facilities. All three camps are available year-round for weekend camping.

==== Order of the Arrow ====
The council is served by the Order of the Arrow through Occoneechee Lodge 104.

=== Old Hickory Council ===
Old Hickory Council (#427)
- Owner: Boy Scouts of America
- Headquarters: Winston-Salem, North Carolina
- Country: United States
- Founded: 1942
- Website www.oldhickorycouncil.org

The Old Hickory Council was founded in 1917 and covers the western Piedmont Triad and Yadkin Valley regions, located in the northwestern part of the state. The council offices are in Winston-Salem.

==== History ====
The Winston-Salem Area Council (#427) was founded in 1917, changing its name to the Old Hickory Council (#427) in 1942.

==== Organization ====
Districts

- Blue Ridge District: Ashe and Watauga counties.
- Seven Rivers District: Alleghany, Stokes, Surry, and Yadkin counties.
- Wachovia District: Forsyth County.
- Wilkes District: Wilkes County.

==== Camps ====
The council operates Raven Knob Scout Reservation, which houses Camp Raven Knob, the summer camp program and is available for weekend camping. They also own Raven Point, a small site with a cabin and deepwater dock located on High Rock Lake. They also own Tommy Cox Memorial Scout Camp, a 4 acre property in Independence, VA on the New River.

==== Order of the Arrow ====
The council is served by the Order of the Arrow through Wahissa Lodge 118.

=== Old North State Council ===
Old North State Council (#070)
- Owner: Boy Scouts of America
- Headquarters: Greensboro, North Carolina
- Country: United States
- Founded: 1992
- Website; Official website

The Old North State Council serves the eastern Piedmont Triad region. The council's name is taken from the state's official song, The Old North State. It covers the counties of Alamance, Caswell, Davidson, Davie, Guilford, Person, Randolph, and Rockingham. Old North State Council's Order of the Arrow counterpart is Tsoiotsi Tsogalii Lodge (#70). Camp facilities include Cherokee Scout Reservation, located in Yanceyville which is home to the annual summer camp, Woodfield Scout Camp, located in Trinity, North Carolina, which allows weekend camping, Hemric Scout Reservation, located on an island on Kerr Lake and is only accessible by boat, and Hagan Sea Base, located on High Rock Lake, and runs Sea Scouts programs.

=== Piedmont Council ===
Piedmont Council (#420)
- Owner: Boy Scouts of America
- Headquarters: Gastonia, North Carolina
- Country: United States
- Founded: 1924
- Website www.piedmontcouncilbsa.org

The Piedmont Council (#420) was founded in 1924. It serves the central and southern Piedmont regions of North Carolina. The council offices are in Gastonia.

==== History ====
1917 saw the founding of the Gastonia Council, which closed in 1918. The Catawba River Council (#415) was founded in 1923, merging with Piedmont in 1927.

==== Organization ====
Districts

- Foothills: Burke, Caldwell, and McDowell counties.
- Gemstone: Iredell County.
- Lakeland: Catawba and Alexander counties.
- South Fork: Gaston and Lincoln counties.
- Broad River: Polk, Rutherford, and Cleveland counties.

==== Camps ====
It runs Camp Bud Schiele (formerly Camp Natomi), located on the Schiele Scout Reservation near Rutherfordton, for summer camp programs and weekend camping. Previously, camps were held near Tryon, North Carolina.

==== Order of the Arrow ====
The council is served by the Order of the Arrow through Eswau Huppeday Lodge 560.

=== Tidewater Council ===
Tidewater Council (#596)
- Owner: Boy Scouts of America
- Headquarters: Virginia Beach, Virginia
- Country: United States
- Founded: 1911
- Scout Executive: James Parnell
- Website http://www.tidewaterbsa.com/

The Tidewater Council serves southeastern Virginia and north-eastern North Carolina. This region is often referred to as South Hampton Roads or the Tidewater or Tidewater Virginia area; hence the name of the council. Its Order of the Arrow counterpart is the Blue Heron Lodge, which was founded in 1946 when a team from Octoraro Lodge in Pennsylvania inducted the first members of Blue Heron Lodge. The North Carolina counties of Camden, Chowan, Currituck, Dare, Gates, Perquimans, and Pasquotank make up the Albemarle District. Camping facilities are located at Pipsico Scout Reservation in Surry County, Virginia.

=== Tuscarora Council ===
Tuscarora Council (#424)
- Owner: Boy Scouts of America
- Headquarters: Goldsboro, North Carolina
- Country: United States
- Founded: 1923
- Website www.bsanc.org

The Tuscarora Council (#424) was founded in 1923 and serves four counties in the east-central portion of North Carolina.

==== History ====
The Tuscarora Council (#424) was founded in 1923 in Goldsboro, North Carolina.

==== Organization ====
Districts

- Neusiok District: Johnston and Sampson Counties.
- Torhunta District: Wayne and Duplin Counties.

==== Camps ====
Camping facilities are located at Camp Tuscarora, between Four Oaks and Newton Grove.

==== Order of the Arrow ====
The council is served by the Order of the Arrow through Nayawin Rar Lodge 296.

== Girl Scouting in North Carolina ==
Girl Scouts of the USA was formed in 1912 by Juliette Gordon Low after she met Lord Baden-Powell and was inspired by the Boy Scouts and Girl Guides in England. It is believed that the first Girl Scout troop in North Carolina was started in 1914, though it is not clear where it was located. Another early North Carolinian troop was started in 1918 in Southern Pines, and its main purpose seemed to be aiding the war effort during World War I. Girl Scouts spread quickly throughout North Carolina during the 1930s, and the first councils were organized around urban centers. Eventually, these small councils merged into eight. Because of a nationwide consolidation of Girl Scout councils in the late 2000s, there are now four Girl Scout councils in North Carolina.

=== Girl Scout Council of Colonial Coast ===
Girl Scout Council of Colonial Coast
- Owner: GSUSA
- Headquarters: Colfax, North Carolina
- Country: United States
- Website www.gsccc.org

This council serves nearly 8,000 girls in southeast Virginia and northeast North Carolina, and has more than 4,000 adult volunteers. In North Carolina, it serves the counties of Hertford, Gates, Camden, Currituck, Pasquotank, Chowan, Bertie, Washington, Tyrrell, Manteo, Perquimans, Hyde, and Dare.

This council's five camps are located in Virginia.

=== Girl Scouts - North Carolina Coastal Pines ===
Girl Scouts - North Carolina Coastal Pines
- Owner: GSUSA
- Headquarters: Raleigh, North Carolina
- Country: United States
- Founded: 2007
- Website www.nccoastalpines.com

Girl Scouts - North Carolina Coastal Pines was formed by the merger of Girl Scout Council of Coastal Carolina and Pines of Carolina Girl Scout Council on October 1, 2007. It serves over 32,000 girls and has nearly 10,000 adult volunteers in the counties of Beaufort, Bladen, Brunswick, Carteret, Chatham, Columbus, Craven, Cumberland, Duplin, Durham, Edgecombe, Franklin, Granville, Greene, Halifax, Harnett, Hoke, Johnston, Jones, Lee, Lenoir, Martin, Moore, Nash, New Hanover, Northampton, Onslow, Orange, Pamlico, Pender, Person, Pitt, Richmond, Robeson, Sampson, Scotland, Vance, Wake, Warren, Wayne, and Wilson.

It operates service centers in Raleigh, NC, Fayetteville, NC, Goldsboro, NC, and Wilmington, NC.

==== Camps ====
- Camp Graham is 155 acres (0.63 km^{2}) on Kerr Lake
- Camp Hardee is 95 acres (380,000 m^{2}) on the Pamlico River near Washington, NC
- Camp Mary Atkinson is 262 acres (1.06 km^{2}) in Johnston County, NC
- Camp Mu-Sha-Ni is 843 acres (3.41 km^{2}) in Richmond County, NC

=== Girl Scouts Carolinas Peaks to Piedmont ===
Girl Scouts Carolinas Peaks to Piedmont
- Owner: GSUSA
- Headquarters: Virginia Beach, Virginia
- Country: United States
- Founded: 2009
- President: Carolyn Brickey
- Chief Executive Officer: Jennifer Wilcox
- Website www.girlscoutsp2p.org

Girl Scouts Carolinas Peaks to Piedmont officially began on October 1, 2009. It was created from the merger of four councils in western North Carolina: Catawba Valley Area Girl Scout Council, Tarheel Triad Girl Scout Council, Pioneer Girl Scout Council, and Girl Scouts of Western North Carolina, Pisgah Council. The council operates service centers in Asheville, NC, Colfax, NC, Gastonia, NC and Hickory, NC. It serves the counties of Alamance, Alexander, Alleghany, Ashe, Avery, Buncombe, Burke, Caldwell, Caswell, Catawba, Cherokee, Clay, Cleveland, Davidson, Davie, Forsyth, Gaston, Graham, Guilford, Haywood, Henderson, Iredell, Jackson, Lincoln, Macon, Madison, McDowell, Mitchell, Polk, Randolph, Rockingham, Rutherford, Stokes, Surry, Swain, Transylvania, Watauga, Wilkes, Yadkin, and Yancey.

==== Camps ====
- Keyauwee Program Center is 350 acres (1.4 km^{2}) and is located in Randolph County in Sophia, North Carolina. It was established in 1945.
- Camp Pisgah is 160 acres (0.65 km^{2}) and is located in Transylvania County in Brevard, NC. It was established in 1953.
- Camp Ginger Cascades is 600 acres (2.4 km^{2}) and is located in Caldwell County near Lenoir, NC. It was established in 1963.

=== Girl Scouts, Hornets' Nest Council ===
Girl Scouts, Hornets' Nest Council
- Owner: GSUSA
- Headquarters: Charlotte, North Carolina
- Country: United States
- Founded: 1935
- Website www.hngirlscouts.org

The Girl Scouts, Hornets' Nest Council is headquartered in Charlotte, North Carolina. It was chartered in 1935. It serves 19,000 girls in the counties of Anson, Cabarrus, Mecklenburg, Montgomery, Rowan, Stanly, Union and York, South Carolina.

==== Camps ====
- Camp Holly Hut is located in Dan Nicholas Park near Salisbury, North Carolina
- Dale Earnhardt Environmental Leadership Campus at Oak Springs is 700 acres and is located 45 minutes north of Charlotte, North Carolina. It was named after the Dale Earnhardt Foundation because of its contributions to the property.
- POD Village is located just behind the GSHNC Service Center in Charlotte, North Carolina and consists of 5 "pods", or octagonal buildings.

== See also ==
- Mounted Boy Scout Troop 290
