= Granville Township =

Granville Township may refer to:

- Granville Township, Putnam County, Illinois
- Granville Township, Kittson County, Minnesota
- Granville Township, Platte County, Nebraska
- Granville Township, McHenry County, North Dakota, in McHenry County, North Dakota
- Granville Township, Licking County, Ohio
- Granville Township, Mercer County, Ohio
- Granville Township, Bradford County, Pennsylvania
- Granville Township, Mifflin County, Pennsylvania
