= William T. Schulte =

American politician (1890–1966)

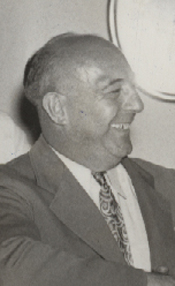

Member of the U.S. House of Representatives from Indiana's 1st district
- In office March 4, 1933 – January 3, 1943
- Preceded by: John W. Boehne Jr.
- Succeeded by: Ray J. Madden

Personal details
- Born: William Theodore Schulte; August 19, 1890 St. Bernard Township, Platte County, Nebraska
- Died: December 7, 1966 (aged 76) Hammond, Indiana
- Resting place: St. Joseph’s Cemetery
- Party: Democratic

William Theodore Schulte (August 19, 1890 – December 7, 1966) was an American politician who served five terms as a U.S. representative from Indiana from 1933 to 1943.

== Biography ==
Born in St. Bernard Township, Platte County, Nebraska, Schulte attended the public schools of St. Bernard Township, Nebraska. He moved with his parents to Hammond, Indiana, where he attended high school and received a business training.

He engaged in the theatrical business until 1918. He was also interested in agricultural pursuits. He served as member of the city council of Hammond, Indiana from 1918 to 1922. He resumed the theatrical business until 1932.

=== Congress ===
Schulte was elected as a Democrat to the Seventy-third and to the four succeeding Congresses (March 4, 1933 – January 3, 1943). He was an unsuccessful candidate for renomination in 1942 to the Seventy-eighth Congress.

In 1934 he sponsored a bill, the Alien Exclusion Act, which aimed, among other things, to prevent the employment of foreign nationals in border cities,

=== Later career and death ===
He was a coordinator of field operations in the labor division of the War Production Board, Washington, D.C. from 1942 to 1944. He returned to Lake County, Indiana, and engaged in agricultural pursuits, engaged in the automobile business at Michigan City, Indiana, from October 1947 to March 1949. Sales representative of a construction machinery firm.

He died in Hammond, Indiana, on December 7, 1966. He was interred in St. Joseph's Cemetery.

U.S. House of Representatives
Preceded by John W. Boehne, Jr.	Member of the U.S. House of Representatives from Indiana's 1st congressional district 1933–1943	Succeeded by Ray J. Madden
