= Humphrey Township, Platte County, Nebraska =

Humphrey Township
- Township
- Location in Platte County
- Coordinates: 41°42′08″N 097°25′22″W
- Country: United States
- State: Nebraska
- County: Platte

Area
  - Total: 35.94 sq mi (93.09 km^{2})
  - Land: 35.94 sq mi (93.09 km^{2})
  - Water: 0 sq mi (0 km^{2}) 0%
- Elevation: 1,699 ft (518 m)

Population (2020)
  - Total: 486
  - Density: 13.5/sq mi (5.22/km^{2})
- GNIS feature ID: 0838064

Humphrey Township is one of eighteen townships in Platte County, Nebraska, United States. The population was 486 at the 2020 census. A 2021 estimate placed the township's population at 479.

A small portion of City of Humphrey lies within the Township.

== History ==
Humphrey Township was established in 1872. It was named after Humphrey, New York.

== See also ==
- County government in Nebraska
