= Creston Township, Platte County, Nebraska =

Creston Township
- Township
- Location in Platte County
- Coordinates: 41°41′55″N 097°18′45″W
- Country: United States
- State: Nebraska
- County: Platte

Area
  - Total: 35.85 sq mi (92.85 km^{2})
  - Land: 35.85 sq mi (92.85 km^{2})
  - Water: 0 sq mi (0 km^{2}) 0%
- Elevation: 1,660 ft (506 m)

Population (2020)
  - Total: 371
  - Density: 10.3/sq mi (4.00/km^{2})
- GNIS feature ID: 0837949

Creston Township is one of eighteen townships in Platte County, Nebraska, United States. The population was 371 at the 2020 census. A 2021 estimate placed the township's population at 365.

The Village of Creston lies within the Township.

Creston Township was established in the 1870s.

== See also ==
- County government in Nebraska
