= Shell Creek Township, Platte County, Nebraska =

Shell Creek Township
- Township
- Location in Platte County
- Coordinates: 41°31′03″N 097°25′56″W
- Country: United States
- State: Nebraska
- County: Platte

Area
  - Total: 36.15 sq mi (93.64 km^{2})
  - Land: 35.74 sq mi (92.56 km^{2})
  - Water: 0.42 sq mi (1.09 km^{2}) 1.16%
- Elevation: 1,516 ft (462 m)

Population (2020)
  - Total: 955
  - Density: 26.7/sq mi (10.3/km^{2})
- GNIS feature ID: 0838241

Shell Creek Township is a township in Platte County, Nebraska, United States. The population was 955 at the 2020 census. A 2021 estimate placed the township's population at 939.

A small portion of the Village of Platte Center lies within the Township.

Its namesake Shell Creek runs through it.

== See also ==
- County government in Nebraska
