= Lost Creek Township, Platte County, Nebraska =

Lost Creek Township
- Township
- Location in Platte County
- Coordinates: 41°31′26″N 097°32′43″W
- Country: United States
- State: Nebraska
- County: Platte

Area
  - Total: 36.0 sq mi (93.2 km^{2})
  - Land: 36.0 sq mi (93.2 km^{2})
  - Water: 0 sq mi (0 km^{2}) 0%
- Elevation: 1,614 ft (492 m)

Population (2020)
  - Total: 510
  - Density: 14/sq mi (5.5/km^{2})
- GNIS feature ID: 0838112

Lost Creek Township is one of eighteen townships in Platte County, Nebraska, United States. The population was 510 at the 2020 census. A 2021 estimate placed the township's population at 504.

Most of the Village of Platte Center lies within the Township.

== History ==
Lost Creek Township was established in 1870.

== See also ==
- County government in Nebraska
