= ONSC =

ONSC may refer to:

- Old North State Council, a local council of the Boy Scouts of America serveinb the western Piedmont Triad region of North Carolina
- Ontario Superior Court of Justice
