= Joliet Township =

Joliet Township may refer to one of the following places in the United States:

- Joliet Township, Will County, Illinois
- Joliet Township, Platte County, Nebraska
