= Nebraska Central Railroad =

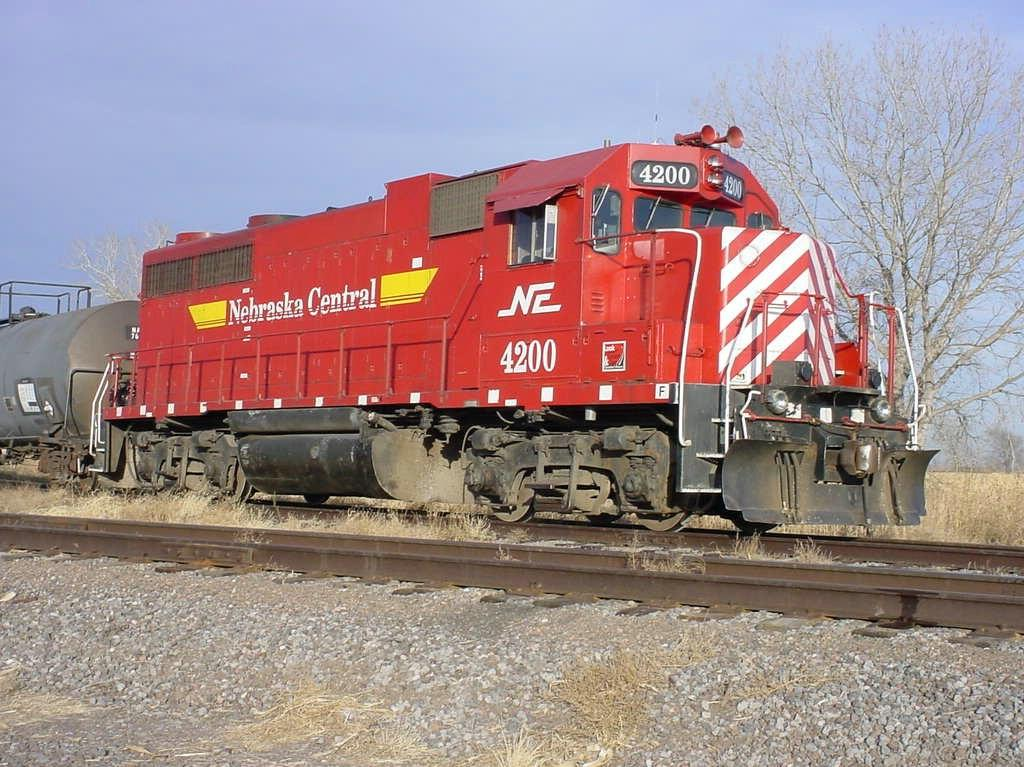
- Nebraska Central locomotive

Overview
- Headquarters: Norfolk, Nebraska
- Founders: Richard Bertel
- Reporting mark: NCRC
- Locale: Nebraska
- Dates of operation: 1993–

Technical
- Track gauge: 4 ft 8 1/2 in (1,435 mm) standard gauge
- Track length: 340 miles

Launched in 1993, the Nebraska Central Railroad (reporting mark NCRC) is a shortline railroad that operates about 340 miles (550 km) of track solely in Nebraska. It runs on former Union Pacific Railroad and BNSF Railway track in central Nebraska. It is a subsidiary of the Rio Grande Pacific Corporation.

== History ==
The Nebraska Central Railroad was started in June 1993 by CEO Richard Bertel and 20 employees. In its first month of operation, a flood caused over $900,000 in damage.

== Subdivisions ==
Albion subdivision, a 34-mile (55 km) stub that starts at Oconee and runs west to Genoa, then turns northwest towards Albion. This subdivision's business includes unit grain trains to Cargill and unit ethanol trains to Valero in Albion. Various small agriculture operations also receive NCRC service.

Cedar Rapids Subdivision, a 45-mile (72 km) stub that starts at Genoa and runs west and then northwest towards Spalding. This subdivision effectively ends at Belgrade; the remaining 23 miles (37 km) is out of service due to marginal traffic. Preferred Sands is a major NCRC customer located west of Genoa.

Norfolk Subdivision is a 53-mile (85 km) stub that starts at the Union Pacific's yard in Columbus, Nebraska and runs west and then north towards Norfolk. Norfolk has a small yard that was once part of Chicago & Northwestern Railroad's Cowboy Line. Train M-CBNC (Council Bluffs-Nebraska Central) runs across this subdivision daily except Sundays with scrap metal for Nucor Corporation, ethanol for Louis Dreyfus and other businesses in Norfolk. Agrex in Enola, between Norfolk and Madison, receives unit grain trains. Tyson Foods in Madison also receives NCRC service.

Ord Subdivision is a 65-mile (105 km) stub that starts at Union Pacific's yard in Grand Island and runs north and northwest to Ord. Green Plains Renewable and Cargill have large facilities near Ord.

Palmer Subdivision is a 20-mile (32 km) stub that starts at Central City off Union Pacific's Columbus Subdivision and runs west to Palmer. This was once a BNSF branch that ran from Aurora towards Burwell and Ericson. Service over this branch was discontinued by NCRC in March 2012.

Stromsburg Subdivision is a 63-mile (101 km) branch line that starts at Central City and runs east to Brainard. This branch was once referred to as the "High Line" by many Union Pacific crews that operated across the branch. The line connected to the Union Pacific's Lincoln Subdivision in Valparaiso prior to the NCRC takeover in 1993. BNSF Railway interchanges with NCRC at David City. Grain trains are the chief commodity moved over the Stromsburg Sub.

=== NCRC Operations ===
Nebraska Central operates out of 3 locations. The headquarters are in Norfolk. The MOW, Signal department and Train Service employees are located in Columbus. The locomotive shop is housed in a former Union Pacific freight house in Grand Island; a small Grand Island Extra Board also operates out of Grand Island.

=== Locomotives ===
Number	Model	Heritage
NCRC 902	GP38-3	Union Pacific
NCRC 908	GP38-3	Union Pacific
NCRC 909	GP38-3	Union Pacific
NCRC 1005	GP38-3	Union Pacific
NCRC 1006	GP38-3	Union Pacific
NCRC 1010	GP38-3	Union Pacific
NCRC 1017	GP38-3	Union Pacific
NCRC 1020	GP38-3	Union Pacific
NCRC 1024	GP38-3	Union Pacific
NCRC 2001	SD38-3	Union Pacific
NCRC 2001	SD38-3	Union Pacific
NCRC 2197	SD60	Union Pacific
NCRC 2207	SD60	Union Pacific
NCRC 2222	SD60	Union Pacific
NCRC 2225	SD60	Union Pacific
NCRC 6326	SD40-2	Penn Central
NCRC 6330	SD40-2	Penn Central
NCRC 6331	SD40-2	NdeM
NCRC 6333	SD40-2	Southern Pacific
NCRC 6795	SD40-2	Burlington Northern
NCRC 8057	SD40-2	Burlington Northern
NCRC 8102	SD40-2	Burlington Northern
NCRC 8118	SD40-2	Burlington Northern
NCRC 8123	SD40-2	Burlington Northern
NCRC 8132	SD40-2	Burlington Northern

Union Pacific Locomotives are seen on a regular basis across the Nebraska Central, as they are used for Unit Train movements and the Norfolk Local per run through agreement.
