= Camp Sam Hatcher =

Camp in Newport, North Carolina, US

Camp Sam Hatcher, North Carolina 34.74342,-76.9238401

Camp Sam Hatcher (now Albemarle in the Pines) is located in Newport, North Carolina. Formerly owned and operated by East Carolina Council, the property was sold in 2023 and purchased by Camp Albemarle, a faith based ministry that operates day and residential summer camp programs, and is home to The Nature School, a private K-8th grade school and a preschool. It is also the home of Alby After School, a program providing After School care.

In 1985, it served as "a facility for emotionally troubled youngsters" with 60 residents, operated by the Eckerd Foundation
