= Rosenburg, Nebraska =

Unincorporated community in Nebraska, U.S.

Coordinates: 41°37′55″N 97°45′14″W

Rosenburg or Rosenborg is an unincorporated community in Platte County, Nebraska, United States.

== History ==
Rosenburg had a post office from 1901 until 1904. The first postmaster, Eske Petersen, named Rosenburg after a place in his native Denmark.
