= Cornlea, Nebraska =

Village in Platte County, Nebraska, United States

- Village
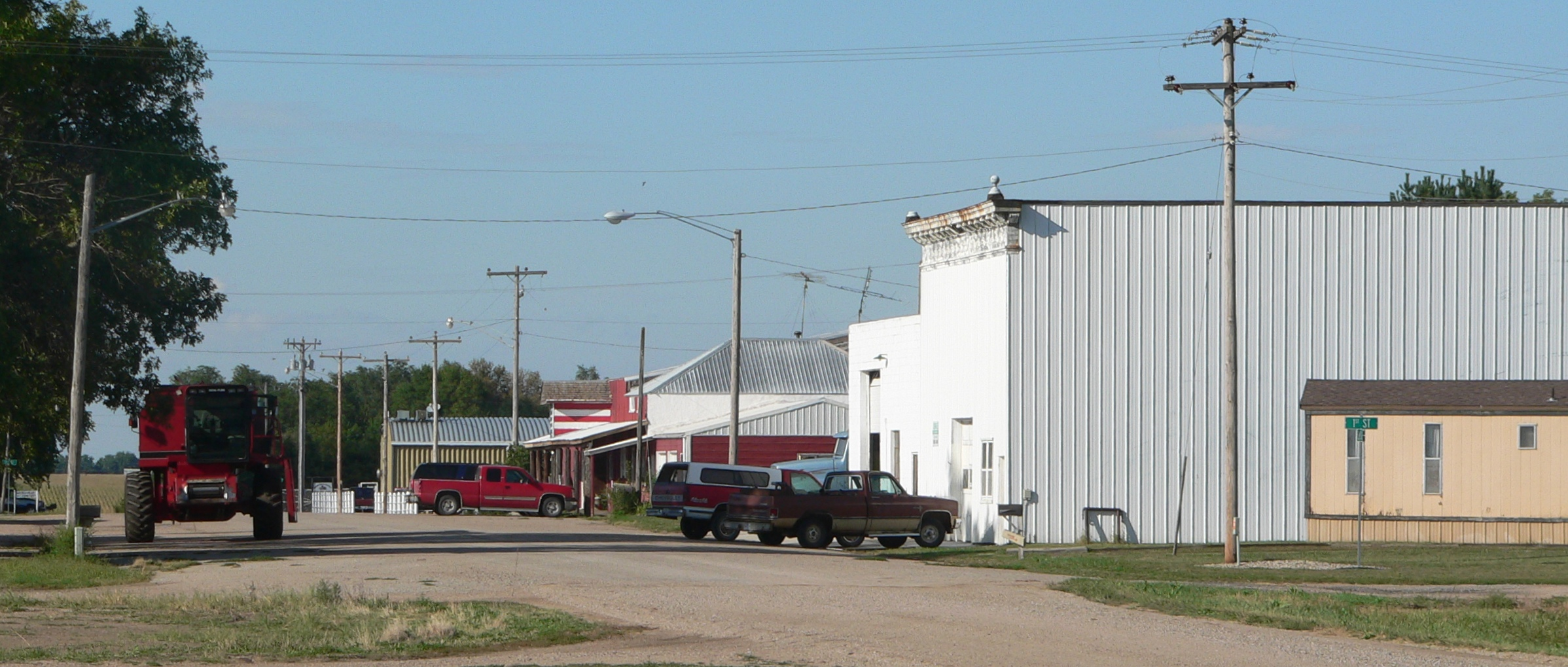
- Downtown Cornlea: Elm Street, September 2010

- Location of Cornlea, Nebraska
- Coordinates: 41°40′48″N 97°34′01″W
- Country: United States
- State: Nebraska
- County: Platte
- Township: Granville

Area
  - Total: 0.093 sq mi (0.24 km^{2})
  - Land: 0.093 sq mi (0.24 km^{2})
  - Water: 0 sq mi (0.00 km^{2})
- Elevation: 1,723 ft (525 m)

Population (2020)
  - Total: 33
  - Density: 356.9/sq mi (137.79/km^{2})
- Time zone: UTC-6 (Central (CST))
  - Summer (DST): UTC-5 (CDT)
- ZIP code: 68642
- Area code: 402
- FIPS code: 31-10600
- GNIS feature ID: 2398630

Cornlea is a village in Platte County, Nebraska, United States. The population was 33 at the 2020 census.

== History ==
Cornlea had its start in the year 1886 as a siding on the railroad. Cornlea's location in the Corn Belt caused its name, meaning "land of corn", to be selected. Cornlea was originally built up chiefly by German Catholics. The town was incorporated as a village in 1902.

A post office was established in Cornlea in 1887, and remained in operation until it was discontinued in 1989.

== Geography ==
According to the United States Census Bureau, the village has a total area of 0.09 square miles (0.23 km^{2}), all land.

== Demographics ==
Historical population
Census	Pop.	Note	%±
1910	90		—
1920	95		5.6%
1930	105		10.5%
1940	67		−36.2%
1950	69		3.0%
1960	44		−36.2%
1970	54		22.7%
1980	40		−25.9%
1990	39		−2.5%
2000	41		5.1%
2010	36		−12.2%
2020	33		−8.3%
U.S. Decennial Census

=== 2010 census ===
As of the census of 2010, there were 36 people, 12 households, and 10 families living in the village. The population density was 400.0 inhabitants per square mile (154.4/km^{2}). There were 13 housing units at an average density of 144.4 per square mile (55.8/km^{2}). The racial makeup of the village was 91.7% White and 8.3% African American.

There were 12 households, of which 41.7% had children under the age of 18 living with them, 58.3% were married couples living together, 8.3% had a female householder with no husband present, 16.7% had a male householder with no wife present, and 16.7% were non-families. 16.7% of all households were made up of individuals, and 8.3% had someone living alone who was 65 years of age or older. The average household size was 3.00 and the average family size was 3.30.

The median age in the village was 38.5 years. 27.8% of residents were under the age of 18; 8.4% were between the ages of 18 and 24; 19.5% were from 25 to 44; 36.1% were from 45 to 64; and 8.3% were 65 years of age or older. The gender makeup of the village was 52.8% male and 47.2% female.

=== 2000 census ===
As of the census of 2000, there were 41 people, 14 households, and 9 families living in the village. The population density was 452.2 inhabitants per square mile (174.6/km^{2}). There were 15 housing units at an average density of 165.5 per square mile (63.9/km^{2}). The racial makeup of the village was 100.00% White. Hispanic or Latino of any race were 2.44% of the population.

There were 14 households, out of which 42.9% had children under the age of 18 living with them, 57.1% were married couples living together, 7.1% had a female householder with no husband present, and 28.6% were non-families. 28.6% of all households were made up of individuals, and 7.1% had someone living alone who was 65 years of age or older. The average household size was 2.93 and the average family size was 3.70.

In the village, the population was spread out, with 43.9% under the age of 18, 4.9% from 18 to 24, 26.8% from 25 to 44, 12.2% from 45 to 64, and 12.2% who were 65 years of age or older. The median age was 28 years. For every 100 females, there were 95.2 males. For every 100 females age 18 and over, there were 109.1 males.

As of 2000 the median income for a household in the village was $33,750, and the median income for a family was $35,833. Males had a median income of $31,250 versus $26,250 for females. The per capita income for the village was $9,627. None of the population and none of the families were below the poverty line.

== See also ==
- List of municipalities in Nebraska
