= Grand Prairie Township, Platte County, Nebraska =

Grand Prairie Township
- Township
- Location in Platte County
- Coordinates: 41°36′50″N 097°25′39″W
- Country: United States
- State: Nebraska
- County: Platte

Area
  - Total: 36.19 sq mi (93.74 km^{2})
  - Land: 36.19 sq mi (93.74 km^{2})
  - Water: 0 sq mi (0 km^{2}) 0%
- Elevation: 1,617 ft (493 m)

Population (2020)
  - Total: 333
  - Density: 9.20/sq mi (3.55/km^{2})
- GNIS feature ID: 0838032

Grand Prairie Township is one of eighteen townships in Platte County, Nebraska, United States. The population was 333 at the 2020 census. A 2021 estimate placed the township's population at 329.

== History ==
Grand Prairie Township was originally called Stearns Township, and under the latter name was established in 1872. It was renamed Grand Prairie in 1874.

== See also ==
- County government in Nebraska
