= Raven Knob Scout Reservation =

Scout reservation in Surry County, North Carolina, U.S.

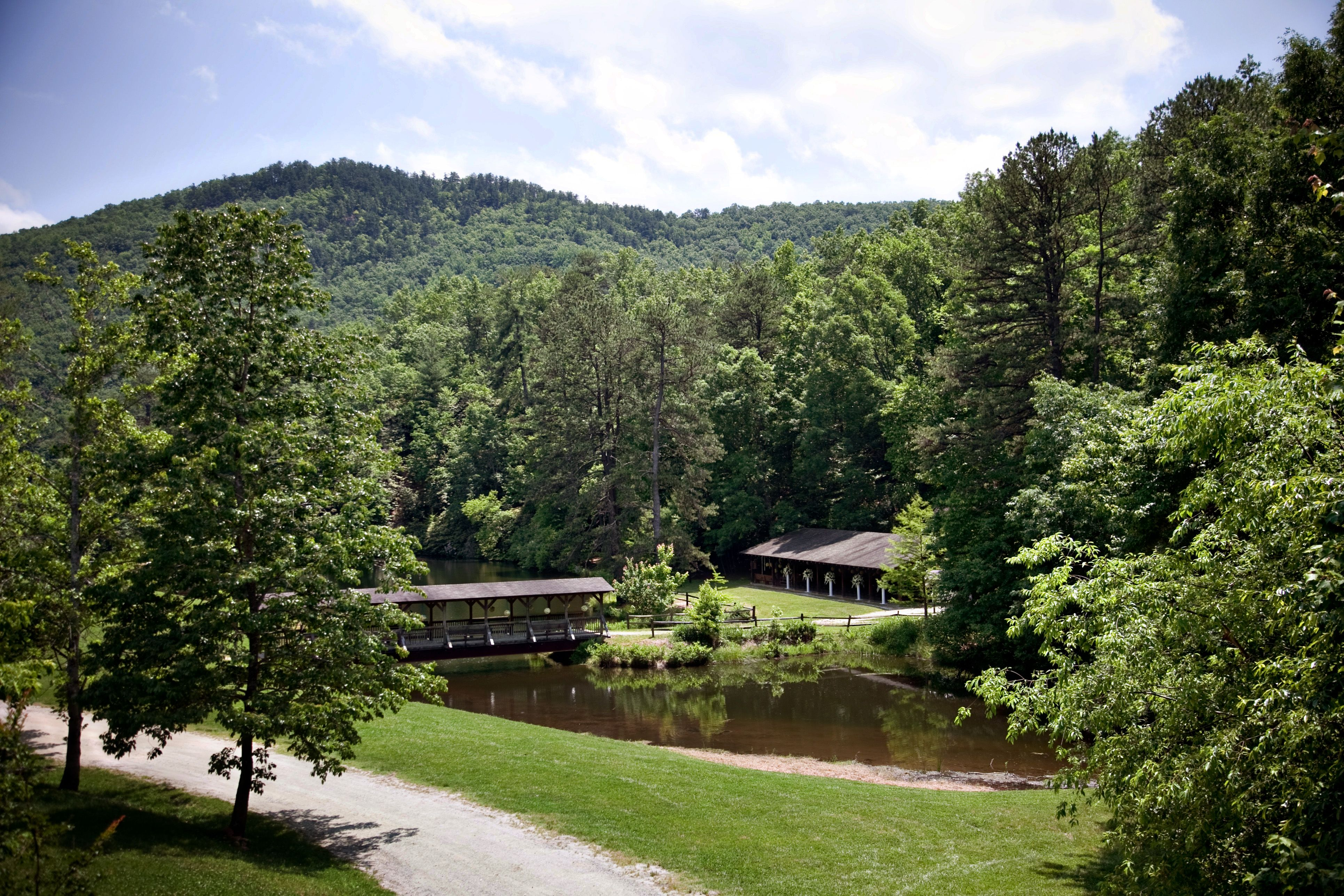
- A view of Lake Watson from the Program Center
- Owner: Old Hickory Council
- Location: 266 Raven Knob Road; Mount Airy, North Carolina 27030 (336) 352-4307
- Country: United States
- Coordinates: 36°28′45″N 80°50′37″W
- Founded: 1954
- Camp Director: Adam Moore
- Website www.ravenknob.com

Raven Knob Scout Reservation is a 3200 acre Boy Scout camp operated by the Old Hickory Council of the Boy Scouts of America. The reservation is located in Surry County, North Carolina, United States.

== History ==
=== Origins ===
The Old Hickory Council, BSA held their first Scouting function, a spring camporee, at Raven Knob Park near Mount Airy, North Carolina in 1954. From this event, Council officials determined that the park site would be suitable for a summer camp. This new camp would replace Camp Lasater, which was located close to Winston-Salem. Raven Knob Park was purchased in June 1954 and became Camp Raven Knob. Local resident Kyle Norman was hired as Camp Ranger. Ted Waller was the first Camp Director.

=== Founding (1955 - early 1980s) ===
The original facilities at Raven Knob Park included a man-made lake and bath house, a restaurant and dance hall, picnic tables, outdoor grills, an outdoor bowling alley, and several model cabins. Before the Order of the Arrow State Fellowship Meeting in April 1956, a dining hall, administration building, and health lodge were completed. In 1957, a flag pole for the parade ground in front of the dining hall and a granite main entrance gate were donated by the North Carolina Granite Corporation. The dance hall/restaurant became the camp trading post when the new Mary Reynolds Babcock dining hall was completed that year.

In the late 1950s, Chigger Hollow, near the main gate of camp, was used as the council campfire ring. This site was used for opening and closing campfires during summer camp until at least 1980. Also during this time, the Order of the Arrow Arena was improved and first used for visitor campfires on Wednesday evenings. The Arena has been expanded and upgraded several times, the last being in 2006 when it was renamed the Vaughn-Woltz Order of the Arrow Arena. The arena has a capacity for approximately 2000 people.

During the 1960s, an aquatics building was constructed and additional real estate, including the Knob itself, was purchased.

In 1974, Urner Goodman, the co-founder of the Order of the Arrow, attended the dedication of the G. Kellock Hale Jr. Training Center and Wahissa Lodge Building. The lodge was constructed on a hilltop behind the Trading Post with views of the lake and the knob. Before the building was constructed, Wahissa Lodge #118 used temporary tent areas and the Log Cabin as their headquarters. The Log Cabin became the traditional staff quarters for the Program Director and other senior staff. The John T. Atwell Cottage was constructed for use by the Camp Director.

From Winston-Salem, the traditional route to camp was along US Highway 52 past Pilot Mountain to NC Route 89 in Mount Airy. After 1976, with the opening of Interstate 77, travel time to camp for many in the council decreased and access to camp for scout groups along the eastern seaboard was much easier.

=== Expansion (late 1980s-Present) ===
In the late 1980s and early 1990s, after a capital campaign, the Mary Reynolds Babcock Dining Hall was expanded, the Zeb Barnhardt Training Center was constructed, and the Trading Post was renovated. Dave Whitfield, as a private contractor, renovated several buildings at Raven Knob, including the Administration Building, before becoming Camp Ranger in 1994. Keith Bobbitt, the former Camp Director, served in 1984 and began his current tenure in 1990.

In 2000, the Harry R. Vaughn Sr. Dining Hall opened and tripled the seating capacity for meals. The Mary Reynolds Babcock Dining Hall became the Program Center. A new Order of the Arrow arena was constructed in 2006. A new Health Lodge was constructed in 2012. A new Rifle Range, Archery Range, and Climbing Tower were completed in 2013. Today some 36 campsites accommodate hundreds of Scouts and Leaders each week. Raven Knob now serves approximately 5000 campers per summer.

Over its history, camping at Raven Knob on weekend outings, at OA events, and at summer camp has become a longstanding tradition. Scout troops from throughout northwest North Carolina and the eastern United States take advantage of the camp’s scenic views, climate, and variety of programs.

=== Recent ===
The Wesley K. Morgan Maintenance and Logistics Center was completed in the 2013-2014 off-season and dedicated on May 17, 2014, by Wesley Morgan's wife, Barbee Morgan. The Aquatics area was expanded during the 2014 off-season to allow for additional swimming space. This was accomplished by installing a new dock. For the 2015-2016 off-season, a staff village was installed behind Dan Beard campsite to replace the former Program Center quarters which housed the Handicraft staff. The first person to donate a staff cabin to the effort was James "Doc" Bennett.

In 2019, a metalworking facility was built following the demolition of the former climbing tower in 2018. Additionally in 2019, a new Handicrafts facility was constructed to match the new metalwork facility, both behind the Program Center.

== Infrastructure ==
=== Communications ===
The camp has an extensive phone system that enables direct dialing to the various program areas of the camp. Phone lines and DSL internet services are provided by Surry Telephone Membership Corporation.

=== Health Lodge ===
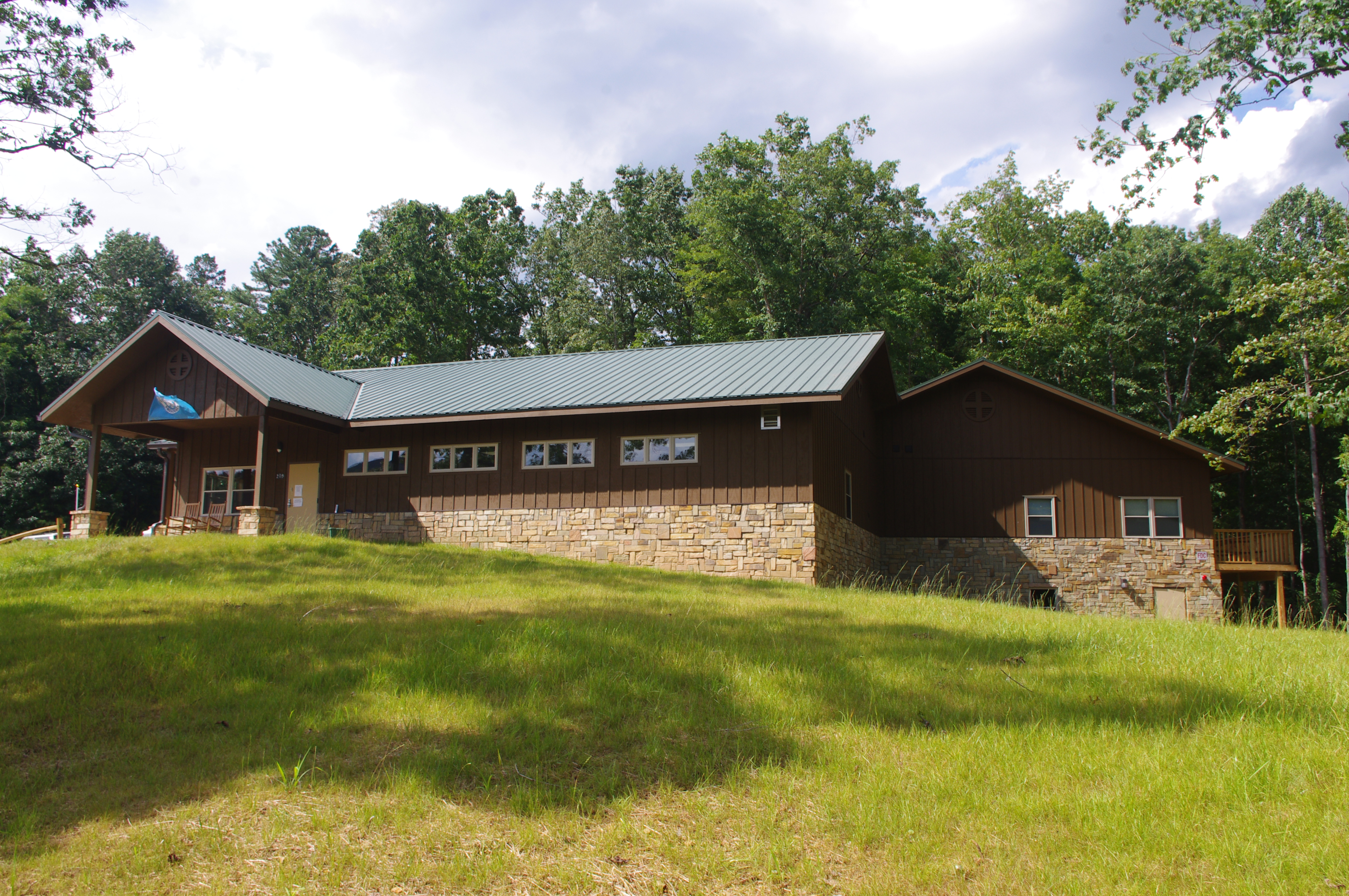
Built in 2012, this facility has 4 examining rooms, a ward, and several design features to make the facility handicap accessible.

The original Health Lodge was built at Camp Raven Knob in 1960. The old facility served camp until 2012 when it was torn down to make room for a much larger facility. The Health Lodge staff offers training for adults attending camp, such as CPR training. Raven Knob has a working relationship with Northern Surry Hospital for more intensive medical needs.

=== Maintenance ===
Camp Ranger Jeff Mosley and a team of volunteers maintain camp facilities year round.

=== Trails ===
Raven Knob has several miles of trails. They range from shorter, hour-long hikes to longer, day hike length trails. Popular trails include the Knob Trail that goes to Raven Knob, the Lake trail that follows the shores of Lake Sabotta, and the boundary trail that roughly follows the edge of the property.

== Program ==
Raven Knob offers several dozen merit badges and programs that are available to three levels of Scouting, Cub Scouts, Scouts BSA, and Venture Crew Members.

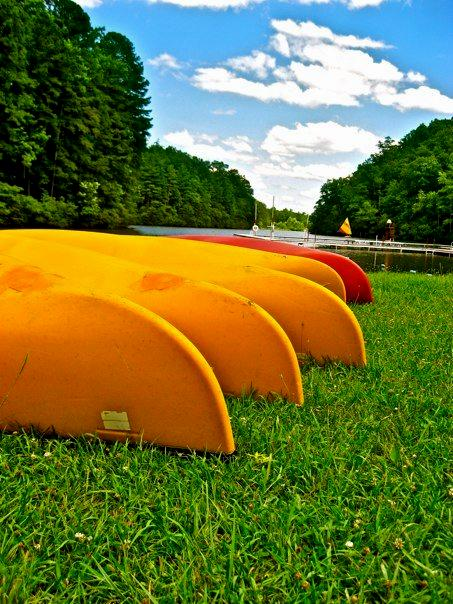
A view of Lake Sabotta and some of camp's canoes.

=== Aquatics ===
The Aquatics program provides varying levels of swimming instruction, from beginner's instruction to BSA Lifeguard certification. Scouts can boat on Lake John Sabotta in canoes, row boats, and sail boats. The current area director Carleigh Scott.

=== Climbing ===
Raven Knob recently built a new climbing tower, officially called the BB&T Leadership Tower. The tower has walls of varying difficulty on all four sides. Two inside walls are designed for use by Cub Scouts, but are sometimes used by Boy Scouts when there is inclement weather.

=== Cripple Creek ===
Cripple Creek is based in the back country of camp. It is an all week program that shows scouts what it was like to be a pioneer. During the course of a week, scout pioneers will complete several activities including but not limited to: knife making, leather making, learning the uses of edible plants, learning how to use wood tools, gem mining, learning how to track and trap, cooking with a wood cook stove and cast iron, learning about our pioneer ancestors, blacksmithing, and black powder rifle shooting.

=== Handicrafts ===
Handicrafts offers many badges that are often taken by younger scouts. They include hands-on projects that the scouts can take home at the end of the week. Generally a small fee is required to cover the cost of materials. The current area director is Jadon Vaughan.

=== Mountain Biking ===
Scouts can have the opportunity to learn and practice the skills needed for a mountain bike trip, including proper riding skills, maintenance, and trip preparations. A variety of trails and old logging roads on camp property are used for this program.

Scouts who successfully complete the Mountain Biking program earn the Cycling merit badge.

=== Nature ===
The Nature Area features a variety of animals and displays for Scouts to observe. In addition to merit badges, the Nature Area hosts a frog hunt, a fishing tournament, and some other twilight programs in the evening. The current area director is Roy Hedgecough.

=== Raven Scouts ===
The Raven Scouts program covers all the basic scouting Skills required to earn the First Class rank. There are two programs available: Raven Scout and Senior Raven. The Raven Scout focuses on the requirements for Tenderfoot and Second Class and the Senior Raven focuses on the requirements for First Class. The current area director is Dominic Walker.

=== Scoutcraft ===
The Scoutcraft area in located in the center of main camp. This area includes merit badges such as Wilderness Survival, Cooking, Camping, Pioneering, and many more. Each Thursday night of Boy Scout Summer Camp, the Wilderness Survival sessions attend on overnight camping trip in Raven Knob's back country to practice their skills of building debris huts and sleeping in them overnight. The current area director is Will Tilley.

=== RAMPAGE!!! ===
The RAMPAGE!!! area is the "premier high adventure program" at Raven Knob, with white water canoeing, riverboarding, rock climbing and backpacking. The current area director is Josh Lawson.

=== Range and Target Activities ===
The RATA area has a twenty-four position rifle range as well as a fourteen position archery range. Additionally, the camp has a shotgun range that has a four position training trap and a five position pyramid wobble trap. The current area director is David Haymore.

=== Technology ===
The Technology Area is based at the recently renovated STEM Center inside a former staff quarters building across from the Health Lodge. Sessions are also offered at the Program Center and the Barnhardt Training Center. This program offers merit badges that are based on Science, Technology, Engineering, and Mathematics (S.T.E.M) such as Space Exploration, Game Design, Robotics, Welding, Aviation, Engineering, and Digital Technology. The current area director is Micah Vaughan.

=== Trail to Eagle ===
The Trail to Eagle area is located in the Program Center in the middle of camp. This area includes merit badges that are required by the Boy Scouts of America to obtain the rank of Eagle Scout. Merit badges in this area include Communications, Citizenship in the World, Citizenship in the Nation, Personal Fitness, and Personal Management. The current area director is Caleb Vaughan.

== Wahissa Lodge #118 ==
Wahissa Lodge #118 is the local Order of the Arrow lodge serving the Old Hickory Council. Founded in 1938, by G. Kellock Hale Jr., Wahissa Lodge is an integral part of the camping operations at Raven Knob.

=== Founders ===
Since its creation in the summer of 1938, Wahissa Lodge has had a continuous existence in the Old Hickory Council in northwestern North Carolina. The founders of our lodge were Mr. G. Kellock Hale, Jr., (known as Kel) and Mr. William Edward Vaughan-Lloyd, Sr. (known as Ned or Skipper). In 1938, Mr. Hale was a scoutmaster in Mount Airy, North Carolina, and Mr. Vaughan-Lloyd was the professional council executive of the Winston-Salem Council (Old Hickory Council). Both men were heavily involved in the operation of Boy Scout Camp Lasater near Winston-Salem.

Mr. Hale was a member of Unami Lodge in Philadelphia, Pennsylvania, as a boy; and he served with Urner Goodman on the staff of its Treasure Island Boy Scout Camp in 1919. Mr. Hale consulted Goodman after Mr. Vaughan-Lloyd asked Mr. Hale to explore the establishment of an Order of the Arrow lodge in the council.

Mr. Hale was an active member of the National Committee of the Order of the Arrow beginning just before his brief term as National Chairman in 1948 and ending with his death in 1973.

Mr. Vaughan-Lloyd worked for the Order of the Arrow in North Carolina and the South during the 1940s. Both men received the Order of the Arrow’s Distinguished Service Award in 1946. Mr. Vaughn-Lloyd imagined the program working in Winston-Salem for the betterment of its youth. Mr. Hale’s experiences at Treasure Island Scout Camp influenced his motivation to share those experiences with scouts in the Winston-Salem Council. Vaughn-Lloyd and Hale worked together to found Wahissa Lodge #118.

=== Legacy ===
Wahissa’s founders, Kel Hale and Skipper Vaughan-Lloyd, began with about forty charter members. Today, the Lodge has approximately 875 active status members.

As a memorial to Kel Hale, Wahissa Lodge constructed a lodge building at Camp Raven Knob in 1974. The building is located at a high point in the center of camp between tall oaks and pines.

Camp Lasater served the Old Hickory Council from 1923 until 1953. Camp Raven Knob has served the council since 1954. Many artifacts and stories from Scouting’s history in North Carolina can be found in the Old Hickory Council's Boy Scout Museum, which opened in 1998.

== In popular culture ==
The movie Cabin Fever was filmed at the Catawba Cabin, an old primitive area where the Mountain Man program used to be held.

== See also ==
- Scouting in North Carolina
