= Burrows Township, Platte County, Nebraska =

Burrows Township
- Township
- Location in Platte County
- Coordinates: 41°37′00″N 097°32′00″W
- Country: United States
- State: Nebraska
- County: Platte

Area
  - Total: 35.93 sq mi (93.07 km^{2})
  - Land: 35.93 sq mi (93.07 km^{2})
  - Water: 0 sq mi (0 km^{2}) 0%
- Elevation: 1,693 ft (516 m)

Population (2020)
  - Total: 261
  - Density: 7.26/sq mi (2.80/km^{2})
- GNIS feature ID: 0837898

Burrows Township is one of eighteen townships in Platte County, Nebraska, United States. The population was 261 at the 2020 census. A 2021 estimate placed the township's population at 257.

The Village of Tarnov lies within the Township.

Burrows Township was established in or before 1873.

== See also ==
- County government in Nebraska
