= Sherman Township, Platte County, Nebraska =

Sherman Township
- Township
- Location in Platte County
- Coordinates: 41°36′58″N 097°18′05″W
- Country: United States
- State: Nebraska
- County: Platte

Area
  - Total: 35.98 sq mi (93.19 km^{2})
  - Land: 35.97 sq mi (93.15 km^{2})
  - Water: 0.015 sq mi (0.04 km^{2}) 0.04%
- Elevation: 1,572 ft (479 m)

Population (2020)
  - Total: 227
  - Density: 6.31/sq mi (2.44/km^{2})
- GNIS feature ID: 0838250

Sherman Township is one of eighteen townships in Platte County, Nebraska, United States. The population was 227 at the 2020 census. A 2021 estimate placed the township's population at 224.

== History ==
Sherman was established in 1872.

== See also ==
- County government in Nebraska
