= Ray Madden =

American politician (1892–1987)

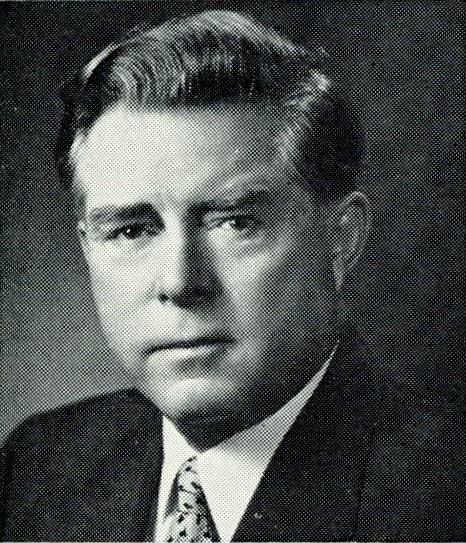

Chair of the House Rules Committee
- In office January 3, 1973 – January 3, 1977
- Preceded by: William M. Colmer
- Succeeded by: James J. Delaney

Member of the U.S. House of Representatives from Indiana's 1st district
- In office January 3, 1943 – January 3, 1977
- Preceded by: William T. Schulte
- Succeeded by: Adam Benjamin Jr.

Personal details
- Born: Ray John Madden; February 25, 1892 Waseca, Minnesota, U.S.
- Died: September 28, 1987 (aged 95) Washington, D.C., U.S.
- Party: Democratic
- Education: Creighton University (LLB)

Military service
- Branch/service: United States Navy
- Years of service: 1917–1918

Ray John Madden (February 25, 1892 – September 28, 1987) was an American lawyer and World War I veteran who served 17 terms as a United States representative from Indiana from 1943 to 1977.

== Early life and education ==
He was born in Waseca, Minnesota. He attended the public schools and Sacred Heart Academy in his native city. He graduated from the law department of Creighton University with an LL.B. in 1913 and was admitted to the bar the same year and commenced practice in Omaha, Nebraska.

== Political career ==
Madden was elected as a municipal judge in Omaha in 1916. He resigned during the First World War to serve in the United States Navy. After the war, he was engaged in the practice of law in Gary, Indiana. He was the city comptroller of Gary from 1935 to 1938 and the treasurer of Lake County, Indiana from 1938 to 1942. He was a delegate to every Democratic National Convention from 1940 through 1968.

=== Congress ===
He was elected as a Democrat to the Seventy-eighth and to the sixteen succeeding Congresses (January 3, 1943 – January 3, 1977). While in Congress, he served as a co-chairman of the Joint Committee on Organization of Congress (Eighty-ninth and Ninetieth Congresses), and chairman of the Committee on Rules (Ninety-third and Ninety-fourth Congresses). He was an unsuccessful candidate for renomination in 1976 to the Ninety-fifth Congress.

=== Madden Committee ===
On September 18, 1951, the United States House of Representatives established the Select Committee to Conduct an Investigation and Study of the Facts, Evidence, and Circumstances of the Katyn Forest Massacre, known as the Madden Committee after its chairman. The purpose was to determine which nation was responsible for the atrocities and whether any American officials had engaged in covering up the massacre.

The committee ruled unanimously that the Soviet Union was responsible for the executions, recommending a trial before the International World Court of Justice. The question of an American cover-up was more complicated. On this issue, the committee concluded that American officials failed to properly evaluate and act upon Russian behavior evident as early as 1942. The committee also determined that American policy toward the Soviet Union might have been different if information had not been deliberately withheld from the public.

== Retirement and death ==
After leaving Congress, he was a resident of Washington, D.C., until his death there. He was buried in Arlington National Cemetery.

== Electoral history ==
General election 1942
Party	Candidate	Votes	%
Democratic	Ray J. Madden	44,334	53.6
Republican	Samuel W. Cullison	38,450	48.5

General election 1944
Party	Candidate	Votes	%
Democratic	Ray J. Madden	75,635	61.3
Republican	Otto G. Fifield	46,969	38.1

General election 1946
Party	Candidate	Votes	%
Democratic	Ray J. Madden	51,809	51.9
Republican	Charles W. Gannon	46,677	48.8

General election 1948
Party	Candidate	Votes	%
Democratic	Ray J. Madden	78,898	60.7
Republican	Theodore L. Sendak	50,194	38.6

General election 1950
Party	Candidate	Votes	%
Democratic	Ray J. Madden	62,666	52.6
Republican	Paul Cyr	56,063	47.0

General election 1952
Party	Candidate	Votes	%
Democratic	Ray J. Madden	93,187	56.4
Republican	Elliot Belshaw	71,617	43.3

General election 1954
Party	Candidate	Votes	%
Democratic	Ray J. Madden	81,217	61.4
Republican	Robert H. More	50,439	38.2

General election 1956
Party	Candidate	Votes	%
Democratic	Ray J. Madden	93,658	52.6
Republican	Donald K. Stimson Jr.	84,125	47.2

General election 1958
Party	Candidate	Votes	%
Democratic	Ray J. Madden	95,801	66.4
Republican	Edward P. Keck	47,588	33.0

General election 1960
Party	Candidate	Votes	%
Democratic	Ray J. Madden	136,443	64.7
Republican	Phillip P. Parker	73,984	35.1

General election 1962
Party	Candidate	Votes	%
Democratic	Ray J. Madden	104,212	60.5
Republican	Harold Moody	67,230	39.0

General election 1964
Party	Candidate	Votes	%
Democratic	Ray J. Madden	133,089	63.7
Republican	Arthur Endres	75,226	36.0

General election 1966
Party	Candidate	Votes	%
Democratic	Ray J. Madden	71,040	58.3
Republican	Albert F. Harrigan	50,804	41.7

General election 1968
Party	Candidate	Votes	%
Democratic	Ray J. Madden	90,055	56.7
Republican	Donalrd E. Taylor	68,318	43.0

General election 1970
Party	Candidate	Votes	%
Democratic	Ray J. Madden	73,145	65.6
Republican	Eugene M. Kirtland	38,294	34.4

General election 1972
Party	Candidate	Votes	%
Democratic	Ray J. Madden	95,873	56.9
Republican	Bruce R. Haller	72,662	43.1

General election 1974
Party	Candidate	Votes	%
Democratic	Ray J. Madden	71,759	68.6
Republican	Joseph D. Harkin	32,793	31.4

U.S. House of Representatives
Preceded by William T. Schulte	Member of the U.S. House of Representatives from Indiana's 1st congressional district 1943–1977	Succeeded by Adam Benjamin Jr.
New office	Chair of the Joint Reorganization Committee; 1965–1966; Served alongside: Mike Monroney	Position abolished
Preceded by William M. Colmer	Chair of the House Rules Committee; 1973–1977	Succeeded by James J. Delaney
Honorary titles
Preceded by Emanuel Celler	Oldest member of the U.S. House of Representatives; 1973–1977	Succeeded by Robert N. C. Nix Sr.
