= Platte County, Nebraska =

County in Nebraska, United States

- County
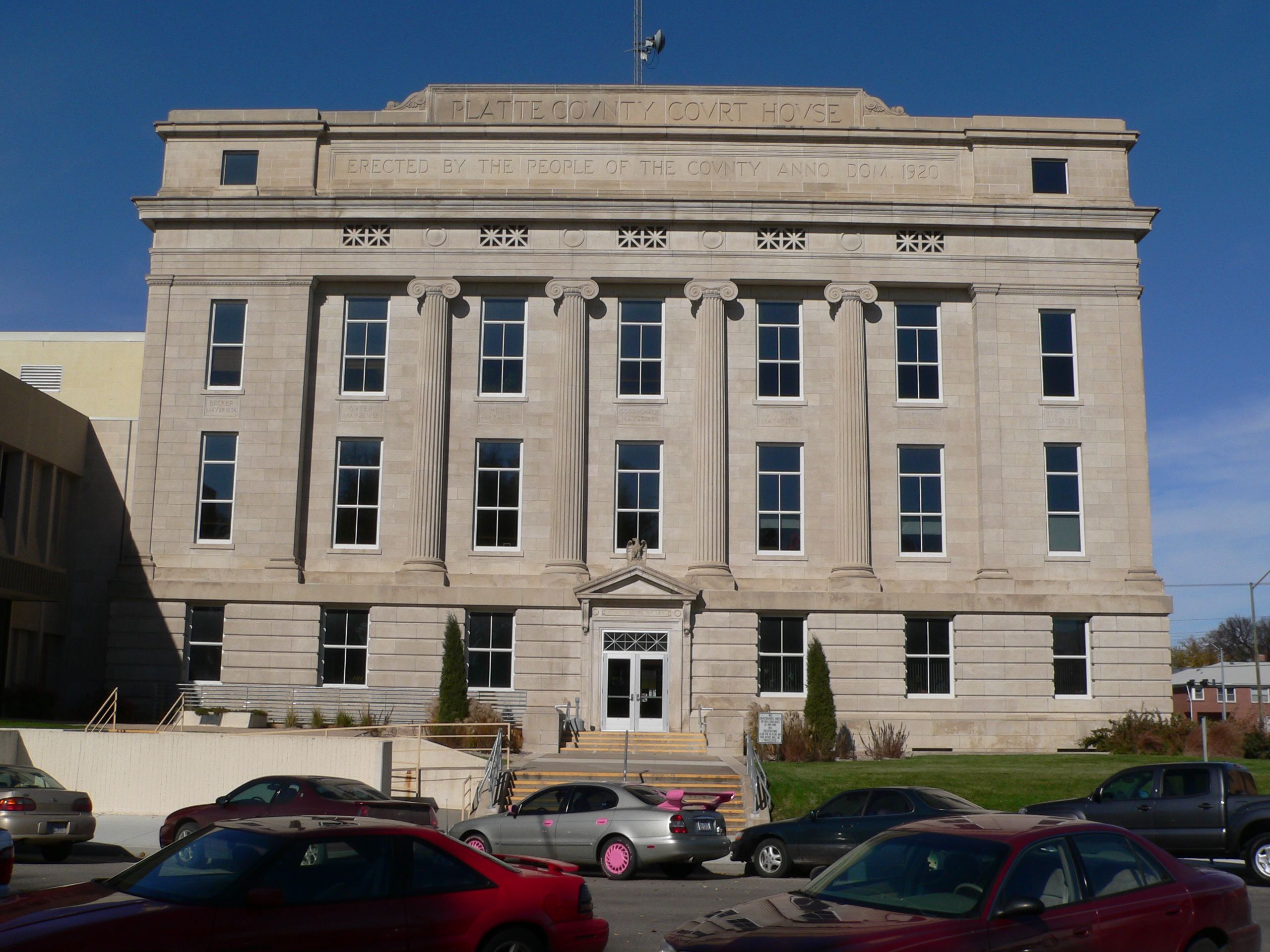
- The Platte County Courthouse in Columbus

- Location within the U.S. state of Nebraska
- Coordinates: 41.5769°N 97.5135°W
- Country: United States
- State: Nebraska
- Founded: January 26, 1856
- Named for: Platte River
- Seat: Columbus
- Largest city: Columbus

Area
  - Total: 684.590 sq mi (1,773.08 km^{2})
  - Land: 675.118 sq mi (1,748.55 km^{2})
  - Water: 9.472 sq mi (24.53 km^{2}) 1.38%

Population (2020)
  - Total: 34,296
  - Estimate (2025): 35,649 ▲
  - Density: 50.800/sq mi (19.614/km^{2})
- Time zone: UTC−6 (Central)
  - Summer (DST): UTC−5 (CDT)
- Area code: 402 and 531
- Congressional district: 1st
- Website: plattecounty.ne.gov
- • Nebraska county number 71 • Nebraska license plate prefix 10

Platte County is a county located in the U.S. state of Nebraska. As of the 2020 census, the population was 34,296, and was estimated to be 35,649 in 2025, making it the eighth-most populous county in Nebraska. The county seat and the largest city is Columbus.

Platte County comprises the Columbus, NE Micropolitan area.

In the Nebraska license plate system, Platte County was represented by the prefix "10" (as it had the 10th-largest number of vehicles registered in the state when the license plate system was established in 1922).

== History ==
Platte County was created on January 26, 1856. The board of commissioners had its first meeting the following year.

Platte County had its first presumptive case of COVID-19 in late March 2020. As of October 3, 2021, one in seven residents of the county have tested positive for COVID-19 and 40% of all residents are vaccinated.

== Geography ==
According to the United States Census Bureau, the county has a total area of 684.590 square miles (1,773.08 km^{2}), of which 675.118 square miles (1,748.55 km^{2}) is land and 9.472 square miles (24.53 km^{2}) (1.38%) is water. It is the 42nd-largest county in Nebraska by total area.

The Platte River flows eastward along the south line of Platte County. The Loup River also flows eastward and east-southeastward through the lower section of the county, discharging into the Platte River near Columbus. The Platte County terrain consists of low rolling hills, largely devoted to agriculture, sloping to the east-southeast.

=== Major highways ===
- U.S. Highway 30
- U.S. Highway 81
- Nebraska Highway 22
- Nebraska Highway 39
- Nebraska Highway 45
- Nebraska Highway 91

=== Transit ===
- Express Arrow

=== Adjacent counties ===
- Colfax County – east
- Butler County – southeast
- Polk County – south
- Merrick County – south
- Nance County – southwest
- Boone County – west
- Madison County – north
- Stanton County – northeast

=== Protected areas ===
- George Says State Wildlife Management Area

== Demographics ==
Historical population
Census	Pop.	Note	%±
1860	782		—
1870	1,899		142.8%
1880	9,511		400.8%
1890	15,437		62.3%
1900	17,747		15.0%
1910	19,006		7.1%
1920	19,464		2.4%
1930	21,181		8.8%
1940	20,191		−4.7%
1950	19,910		−1.4%
1960	23,992		20.5%
1970	26,508		10.5%
1980	28,852		8.8%
1990	29,820		3.4%
2000	31,662		6.2%
2010	32,236		1.8%
2020	34,296		6.4%
2025 (est.)	35,649	▲	3.9%
U.S. Decennial Census; 1790–1960 1900–1990; 1990–2000 2010–2020

As of the third quarter of 2025, the median home value in Platte County was $231,832.

As of the 2024 American Community Survey, there are 13,658 estimated households in Platte County with an average of 2.51 persons per household. The county has a median household income of $71,552. Approximately 9.8% of the county's population lives at or below the poverty line. Platte County has an estimated 67.7% employment rate, with 23.0% of the population holding a bachelor's degree or higher and 90.3% holding a high school diploma. There were 14,325 housing units at an average density of 21.22 per square mile (8.2/km^{2}).

The top five reported languages (people were allowed to report up to two languages, thus the figures will generally add to more than 100%) were English (80.7%), Spanish (18.5%), Indo-European (0.5%), Asian and Pacific Islander (0.2%), and Other (0.1%).

The median age in the county was 37.7 years.

Platte County, Nebraska – racial and ethnic composition Note: the US Census treats Hispanic/Latino as an ethnic category. This table excludes Latinos from the racial categories and assigns them to a separate category. Hispanics/Latinos may be of any race.
Race / ethnicity (NH = non-Hispanic)	Pop. 1980	Pop. 1990	Pop. 2000	Pop. 2010	Pop. 2020
White alone (NH)	28,666 (99.36%)	29,374 (98.50%)	29,126 (91.99%)	27,167 (84.28%)	25,583 (74.59%)
Black or African American alone (NH)	4 (0.01%)	53 (0.18%)	93 (0.29%)	128 (0.40%)	346 (1.01%)
Native American or Alaska Native alone (NH)	25 (0.09%)	61 (0.20%)	74 (0.23%)	97 (0.30%)	98 (0.29%)
Asian alone (NH)	60 (0.21%)	74 (0.25%)	127 (0.40%)	149 (0.46%)	198 (0.58%)
Pacific Islander alone (NH)	—	—	5 (0.02%)	6 (0.02%)	9 (0.03%)
Other race alone (NH)	14 (0.05%)	3 (0.01%)	13 (0.04%)	37 (0.11%)	101 (0.29%)
Mixed race or multiracial (NH)	—	—	152 (0.48%)	201 (0.62%)	709 (2.07%)
Hispanic or Latino (any race)	83 (0.29%)	255 (0.86%)	2,072 (6.54%)	4,452 (13.81%)	7,252 (21.15%)
Total	28,852 (100.00%)	29,820 (100.00%)	31,662 (100.00%)	32,236 (100.00%)	34,296 (100.00%)

=== 2024 estimate ===
As of the 2024 estimate, there were 35,499 people, 13,658 households, and _ families residing in the county. The population density was 52.58 inhabitants per square mile (20.3/km^{2}). There were 14,325 housing units at an average density of 21.22 per square mile (8.2/km^{2}). The racial makeup of the county was 93.2% White (70.3% NH White), 1.9% African American, 2.5% Native American, 1.0% Asian, 0.2% Pacific Islander, _% from some other races and 1.2% from two or more races. Hispanic or Latino people of any race were 26.8% of the population.

=== 2020 census ===
As of the 2020 census, there were 34,296 people, 13,313 households, and 9,063 families residing in the county. The population density was 50.80 inhabitants per square mile (19.6/km^{2}). There were 14,094 housing units at an average density of 20.88 per square mile (8.1/km^{2}). The racial makeup of the county was 78.53% White, 1.09% African American, 0.89% Native American, 0.60% Asian, 0.03% Pacific Islander, 10.73% from some other races and 8.14% from two or more races. Hispanic or Latino people of any race were 21.15% of the population.

The median age was 38.3 years. 26.2% of residents were under the age of 18 and 17.5% of residents were 65 years of age or older. For every 100 females there were 101.4 males, and for every 100 females age 18 and over there were 99.5 males age 18 and over.

72.4% of residents lived in urban areas, while 27.6% lived in rural areas.

There were 13,313 households in the county, of which 32.1% had children under the age of 18 living with them and 22.0% had a female householder with no spouse or partner present. About 27.2% of all households were made up of individuals and 12.6% had someone living alone who was 65 years of age or older.

There were 14,094 housing units, of which 5.5% were vacant. Among occupied housing units, 72.0% were owner-occupied and 28.0% were renter-occupied. The homeowner vacancy rate was 1.1% and the rental vacancy rate was 5.4%.

=== 2010 census ===
As of the 2010 census, there were 32,236 people, 12,658 households, and 9,213 families residing in the county. The population density was 47.75 inhabitants per square mile (18.4/km^{2}). There were 13,378 housing units at an average density of 19.82 per square mile (7.7/km^{2}). The racial makeup of the county was 90.03% White, 0.45% African American, 0.68% Native American, 0.47% Asian, 0.04% Pacific Islander, 6.86% from some other races and 1.48% from two or more races. Hispanic or Latino people of any race were 13.81% of the population.

=== 2000 census ===
As of the 2000 census, there were 31,662 people, 12,076 households, and 8,465 families residing in the county. The population density was 46.90 inhabitants per square mile (18.1/km^{2}). There were 12,916 housing units at an average density of 19.13 per square mile (7.4/km^{2}). The racial makeup of the county was 94.29% White, 0.35% African American, 0.28% Native American, 0.40% Asian, 0.03% Pacific Islander, 3.49% from some other races and 1.15% from two or more races. Hispanic or Latino people of any race were 6.54% of the population.

There were 12,076 households, out of which 36.10% had children under the age of 18 living with them, 59.20% were married couples living together, 7.60% had a female householder with no husband present, and 29.90% were non-families. 25.90% of all households were made up of individuals, and 11.40% had someone living alone who was 65 years of age or older. The average household size was 2.59 and the average family size was 3.14.

The county population contained 29.00% under the age of 18, 8.10% from 18 to 24, 27.50% from 25 to 44, 21.60% from 45 to 64, and 13.80% who were 65 years of age or older. The median age was 36 years. For every 100 females there were 98.40 males. For every 100 females age 18 and over, there were 95.60 males.

The median income for a household in the county was $39,359, and the median income for a family was $47,776. Males had a median income of $30,672 versus $21,842 for females. The per capita income for the county was $18,064. About 5.40% of families and 7.70% of the population were below the poverty line, including 9.00% of those under age 18 and 6.80% of those age 65 or over.

== Communities ==
=== Cities ===
- Columbus (county seat)
- Humphrey
- Newman Grove (part)

=== Villages ===
- Cornlea
- Creston
- Duncan
- Lindsay
- Monroe
- Platte Center
- Tarnov

=== Census-designated place ===
- Lakeview

=== Other unincorporated communities ===
- Oconee
- Rosenborg
- Saint Bernard
- Tracy Valley

=== Townships ===
- Bismark
- Burrows
- Butler
- Columbus
- Creston
- Grand Prairie
- Granville
- Humphrey
- Joliet
- Lost Creek
- Loup
- Monroe
- Oconee
- St. Bernard
- Shell Creek
- Sherman
- Walker
- Woodville

== Politics ==
Platte County voters have been reliably Republican for decades. In only one election since 1936 has the county selected the Democratic Party candidate.

Political Party	Number of registered voters (April 1, 2026)	Percent
Republican	13,433	65.73%
Democratic	3,384	16.56%
Independent	3,280	16.05%
Libertarian	216	1.06%
Legal Marijuana Now	124	0.61%
Total	20,437	100.00%

United States presidential election results for Platte County, Nebraska
Year	Republican		Democratic		Third party(ies)	
Year	No.	%	No.	%	No.	%
1900	1,608	42.56%	2,117	56.03%	53	1.40%
1904	1,947	52.64%	1,511	40.85%	241	6.52%
1908	1,584	38.21%	2,487	59.99%	75	1.81%
1912	589	15.18%	2,015	51.93%	1,276	32.89%
1916	1,918	43.54%	2,412	54.76%	75	1.70%
1920	4,058	73.88%	1,367	24.89%	68	1.24%
1924	2,108	30.70%	2,173	31.64%	2,586	37.66%
1928	3,435	41.84%	4,748	57.83%	27	0.33%
1932	1,864	21.61%	6,691	77.56%	72	0.83%
1936	2,850	29.96%	6,249	65.70%	413	4.34%
1940	4,929	56.07%	3,862	43.93%	0	0.00%
1944	4,509	56.67%	3,448	43.33%	0	0.00%
1948	3,812	53.47%	3,317	46.53%	0	0.00%
1952	6,695	71.68%	2,645	28.32%	0	0.00%
1956	6,574	69.23%	2,922	30.77%	0	0.00%
1960	6,129	58.28%	4,387	41.72%	0	0.00%
1964	4,705	47.69%	5,160	52.31%	0	0.00%
1968	5,817	60.69%	2,999	31.29%	768	8.01%
1972	7,871	73.38%	2,855	26.62%	0	0.00%
1976	7,217	64.56%	3,693	33.04%	269	2.41%
1980	8,803	73.51%	2,389	19.95%	783	6.54%
1984	10,069	82.38%	2,061	16.86%	92	0.75%
1988	9,040	72.93%	3,285	26.50%	71	0.57%
1992	7,736	55.75%	2,424	17.47%	3,717	26.79%
1996	7,948	64.11%	3,010	24.28%	1,440	11.61%
2000	9,861	76.69%	2,612	20.31%	386	3.00%
2004	11,130	79.57%	2,657	19.00%	200	1.43%
2008	9,373	69.84%	3,796	28.29%	251	1.87%
2012	10,061	74.68%	3,148	23.37%	264	1.96%
2016	10,965	75.97%	2,646	18.33%	822	5.70%
2020	12,186	77.51%	3,260	20.74%	275	1.75%
2024	12,326	78.33%	3,191	20.28%	219	1.39%

== Education ==
School districts include:

- Clarkson Public Schools #58, Clarkson
- Columbus Public Schools #1, Columbus
- Humphrey Public Schools #67, Humphrey
- Lakeview Community Schools #5, Lakeview
- Leigh Community Schools #39, Leigh
- Madison Public Schools #1, Madison
- Newman Grove Public Schools #13, Newman Grove
- St. Edward Public Schools #17, St. Edward
- Twin River Public Schools #30, Genoa

== See also ==
- National Register of Historic Places listings in Platte County, Nebraska

== Notable people ==
- James Keogh, executive editor of Time magazine and the head of the White House speechwriting staff under Richard M. Nixon
