= Woodville Township, Platte County, Nebraska =

Woodville Township
- Township
- Location in Platte County
- Coordinates: 41°33′40″N 097°46′22″W
- Country: United States
- State: Nebraska
- County: Platte

Area
  - Total: 35.38 sq mi (91.64 km^{2})
  - Land: 35.37 sq mi (91.62 km^{2})
  - Water: 0.0077 sq mi (0.02 km^{2}) 0.02%
- Elevation: 1,788 ft (545 m)

Population (2020)
  - Total: 123
  - Density: 3.48/sq mi (1.34/km^{2})
- GNIS feature ID: 0838339

Woodville Township is one of eighteen townships in Platte County, Nebraska, United States. The population was 123 at the 2020 census. A 2021 estimate placed the township's population at 121.

Woodville Township was established in 1873.

== See also ==
- County government in Nebraska
