= Oconee =

Oconee may refer to:

== Places in the United States ==
- Oconee, Georgia
- Oconee, Illinois
- Oconee, Nebraska
- Oconee County, Georgia
- Oconee County, South Carolina
- Oconee River, Georgia
- Oconee Township, Shelby County, Illinois
- Oconee Township, Nebraska
- Lake Oconee, Georgia

== Other uses ==
- Oconee (tribal town), Hitchiti speakers that became part of the Seminole and Creek nations
- Oconee War, in Georgia, USA, 1780s–1790s
- Oconee Nuclear Generating Station, in South Carolina

== See also ==
- Oconi, Ocone, or Oconee, a branch of the Timucua people in southeastern Georgia
- Oconi, Ocone, or Oconee, a town in Apalachee Province in north Florida
