= Monroe Township, Platte County, Nebraska =

Monroe Township
- Township
- Location in Platte County
- Coordinates: 41°31′46″N 097°39′37″W
- Country: United States
- State: Nebraska
- County: Platte

Area
  - Total: 33.98 sq mi (88.01 km^{2})
  - Land: 33.98 sq mi (88.01 km^{2})
  - Water: 0 sq mi (0 km^{2}) 0%
- Elevation: 1,699 ft (518 m)

Population (2020)
  - Total: 126
  - Density: 3.71/sq mi (1.43/km^{2})
- GNIS feature ID: 0838143

Monroe Township is one of eighteen townships in Platte County, Nebraska, United States. The population was 126 at the 2020 census. A 2021 estimate placed the township's population at 124.

== History ==
Monroe Township was established in 1880.

== See also ==
- County government in Nebraska
