= Granville Township, Platte County, Nebraska =

Granville Township
- Township
- Location in Platte County
- Coordinates: 41°41′57″N 097°32′19″W
- Country: United States
- State: Nebraska
- County: Platte

Area
  - Total: 35.67 sq mi (92.38 km^{2})
  - Land: 35.67 sq mi (92.38 km^{2})
  - Water: 0 sq mi (0 km^{2}) 0%
- Elevation: 1,742 ft (531 m)

Population (2020)
  - Total: 949
  - Density: 26.6/sq mi (10.3/km^{2})
- ZIP code: 68642
- Area codes: 402 and 531
- GNIS feature ID: 0838040

Granville Township is one of eighteen townships in Platte County, Nebraska, United States. The population was 949 at the 2020 census. A 2021 estimate placed the township's population at 939.

Most of the City of Humphrey and the entire Village of Cornlea lie within the Township.

== History ==
Granville Township was organized in 1876.

== See also ==
- County government in Nebraska
