= Walker Township, Platte County, Nebraska =

Walker Township
- Township
- Location in Platte County
- Coordinates: 41°40′59″N 097°46′27″W
- Country: United States
- State: Nebraska
- County: Platte

Area
  - Total: 53.60 sq mi (138.82 km^{2})
  - Land: 53.60 sq mi (138.82 km^{2})
  - Water: 0 sq mi (0 km^{2}) 0%
- Elevation: 1,768 ft (539 m)

Population (2020)
  - Total: 205
  - Density: 3.82/sq mi (1.48/km^{2})
- GNIS feature ID: 0838313

Walker Township is one of eighteen townships in Platte County, Nebraska, United States. The population was 205 at the 2020 census. A 2021 estimate placed the township's population at 202.

== History ==
Walker Township was established in 1871 by John Walker and others. In 1884, Joseph Alfred Borg settled on the land and purchased 160 acres.

== See also ==
- County government in Nebraska
