= Bismark Township, Platte County, Nebraska =

Bismark Township
- Township
- Location in Platte County
- Coordinates: 41°31′16″N 097°18′29″W
- Country: United States
- State: Nebraska
- County: Platte

Area
  - Total: 35.95 sq mi (93.12 km^{2})
  - Land: 35.09 sq mi (90.89 km^{2})
  - Water: 0.86 sq mi (2.23 km^{2}) 2.39%
- Elevation: 1,440 ft (440 m)

Population (2020)
  - Total: 438
  - Density: 12.5/sq mi (4.82/km^{2})
- GNIS feature ID: 0837879

Bismark Township is one of eighteen townships in Platte County, Nebraska, United States. The population was 438 at the 2020 census. A 2021 estimate placed the township's population at 433.

== History ==
Bismark Township was established in 1871.

== See also ==
- County government in Nebraska
