= St. Bernard Township, Platte County, Nebraska =

Saint Bernard Township
- Township
- Location in Platte County
- Coordinates: 41°42′01″N 097°39′28″W
- Country: United States
- State: Nebraska
- County: Platte

Area
  - Total: 35.62 sq mi (92.25 km^{2})
  - Land: 35.62 sq mi (92.25 km^{2})
  - Water: 0 sq mi (0 km^{2}) 0%
- Elevation: 1,752 ft (534 m)

Population (2020)
  - Total: 502
  - Density: 14.1/sq mi (5.44/km^{2})
- GNIS feature ID: 0838223

St. Bernard Township is one of eighteen townships in Platte County, Nebraska, United States. The population was 502 at the 2020 census. A 2021 estimate placed the township's population at 500.

The Village of Lindsay lies within the Township.

== History ==
St. Bernard Township was organized in 1883.

== See also ==
- County government in Nebraska
