= Joliet Township, Platte County, Nebraska =

Joliet Township
- Township
- Location in Platte County
- Coordinates: 41°36′40″N 097°39′37″W
- Country: United States
- State: Nebraska
- County: Platte

Area
  - Total: 35.99 sq mi (93.22 km^{2})
  - Land: 35.99 sq mi (93.22 km^{2})
  - Water: 0 sq mi (0 km^{2}) 0%
- Elevation: 1,600 ft (500 m)

Population (2020)
  - Total: 130
  - Density: 3.6/sq mi (1.4/km^{2})
- GNIS feature ID: 0838073

Joliet Township is one of eighteen townships in Platte County, Nebraska, United States. The population was 130 as of the 2020 census. A 2021 estimate placed the township's population at 128.

== History ==
Joliet Township was originally called Lookingglass Township, and under the latter name was organized in 1873.

== See also ==
- County government in Nebraska
