= Old North State Council =

Local council of the Boy Scouts of America

Old North State Council (#070)
- Owner: Boy Scouts of America
- Headquarters: Greensboro, North Carolina
- Country: United States
- Website; Official website

The Old North State Council (ONSC) is a local council of the Boy Scouts of America that serves the eastern and southern portions of the Piedmont Triad region of North Carolina. The council is headquartered at the Royce Reynolds Family Scout Office in Greensboro, North Carolina and operates four camps; one of which is outside the council boundaries. The ONSC represents Boy Scouting in Davie, Davidson, Randolph, Guilford, Alamance, Rockingham, Caswell, and Person counties of North Carolina. The council's name is derived from the state's official song, The Old North State.

== History ==
The Cherokee Council (#417) was founded in 1923. The Greensboro Council (#418) was founded in 1918, changing its name to the General Greene Council (#418) in 1947. The High Point Council (#419) was founded in 1919, changing its name to the Uwharrie Council (#419) in 1923. The Uwharrie, Cherokee, and General Greene councils merged with the Old North State Council (#070) in 1992.

== Organization ==
The Old North State Council is divided into five districts for more locally tailored programs and local leadership. The districts are listed below along with the regions they represent:

- Akela District - represents the greater High Point area (Serving High Point, Thomasville, Jamestown, Wallburg, Archdale, Trinity)
- Alamance District - represents all of Alamance County (including Burlington, Haw River, Saxapahaw, Snow Camp, Mebane, Graham, Elon, and Union Ridge)
- Cherokee District - represents Rockingham, Caswell, and Person Counties (Reidsville, Eden, Stoneville, Mayodan, Madison, Yanceyville, Roxboro, Timberlake, Ruffin, Pelham, Providence, Rougemont)
- Guilford District - represents Monticello, Gibsonville, Julian, Pleasant Garden, Brown Summit, Colfax, Guilford College, Oak Ridge, Stokesdale, Summerfield, and all of Northwestern Greensboro and all of Eastern Guilford County
- Uwharrie District - represents Randolph County, most of Davidson County, and Davie County (Asheboro, Seagrove, Ramseur, Liberty, Randleman, Franklinville, Coleridge, Level Cross, Gray's Chapel, Lexington, Mocksville, Midway, Advance, Linwood, Churchland, Southmont, Denton, and Welcome)

== Camps ==
=== Cherokee Scout Reservation ===
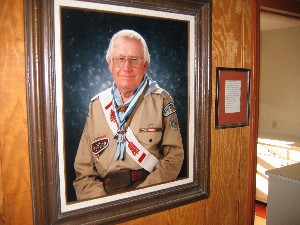
A portrait of Allan "Doc" Lewis rests within the OA Lodge Building named in his honor.

Cherokee Scout Reservation (CSR) is a Boy Scout camp in central Caswell County, North Carolina near the town of Yanceyville. It is situated on over 1,700 acres (6.9 km^{2}) of hardwood forest and is the headquarters for the Tsoiotsi Tsogalii Lodge. The camp was founded in the 1960s by Allan "Doc" Lewis and associates and was named after the local Cherokee tribe. It hosts the council's largest summer camp, which is usually held each week for six weeks each summer. (36.351°N 79.384°W)

History of Cherokee Scout Reservation

The original Camp Cherokee was located in Rockingham County, near the town of Wentworth. Established around 1940, this camp functioned for several years until growth made it obvious that a larger facility would be necessary. For one year, 1967, the camp functioned at a different facility. In 1968 Cherokee (current location) opened to campers and has been welcoming Scouts every summer since.

==== Eyes of Cherokee ====
The camp's official camp song is "The Eyes of Cherokee", which was written by Doc Lewis and is sung to the tune of "I've Been Working on the Railroad". The song's lyrics are as follows:

The eyes of Cherokee are upon you,
All the live-long day.
The eyes of Cherokee are upon you,
You cannot get away.
Do not try to escape them
At night or early in the morn.
The eyes of Cherokee are upon you,
'Til Gabriel blows his horn.

This song is sung multiple times during the year at CSR, most notably by the summer camp staff at the Thursday night campfire. The song has been sung at many world landmarks as well, including the Golden Gate Bridge, the Gateway Arch, and the Wright Brothers Memorial.

=== Woodfield Scout Preservation ===
Woodfield Scout Preservation was an 800-acre (3.2 km^{2}) Boy Scout camp in western Randolph County, North Carolina between the municipalities of Asheboro, Trinity, and Denton (35.7312°N 79.9768°W). It is situated along the banks of the Uwharrie River in the Uwharrie Mountains. Camp Woodfield is mainly used for Cub Scout events, but numerous Boy Scout and Order of the Arrow events are also held there. The camp is divided into three sections: Woodfield East (the largest with most amenities), Woodfield West (more primitive), and Primitive Camp (most primitive). The camp was donated by Elliot S. Wood and Mary Webb Wood in 1989.

As part of the national Boy Scouts of America's bankruptcy to compensate the victims of previous sexual abuse, each council was required to contribute to the survivor's trust fund. To raise the funds to cover its contribution, the Old North State Council divested for Woodfield Scout Preservation in January 2022. The portions of the camp included in the sale are Cub World and Woodfield East. The Old North State Council retains ownership of the land known as Woodfield West. In January 2022, the Old North State Council executive board changed the name from Woodfield West to Woodfield Scout Camp. Woodfield Scout Camp will continue to support unit weekend camping, district camporees, and council training events.

=== Hagan Sea Base ===
Charles T. Hagan Sea Scout Base (or just Hagan Sea Base) is an Old North State Council camp on the Davidson County, North Carolina shores of High Rock Lake. It is located just south of Southmont off North Carolina State Highway 8 (35.639717°N 80.265533°W). The camp was renovated and upgraded in the early 2000s from a primitive-style camp to a functioning summer camp with restrooms and offices. Hagan specializes in water activities for Boy Scouts and Venture Scouts, including canoeing, sailing, fishing and motorboating. 50-mile canoe treks are held at Hagan, as are Whitewater Merit Badge and Canoeing Merit Badge classes.

=== Hemric Scout Reservation ===
H. Clay Hemrick Scout Reservation is an Old North State Council operated camp outside the council boundaries on an island in Kerr Lake near Clarksville, Virginia. It is the least used of the ONSC camps and can only be accessed by watercraft. Facilities on the island include latrines, a small dining hall, a boating dock, and a lodge building.

== Order of the Arrow ==
Tsoiotsi Tsogalii
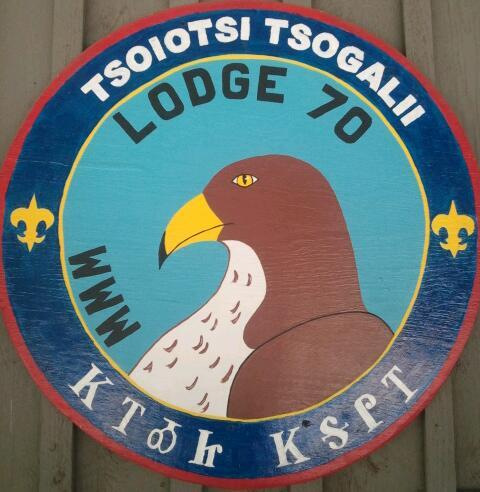
- Owner: Boy Scouts of America
- Headquarters: Greensboro, North Carolina
- Country: United States
- Founded: 1994
- Website; Lodge70.org

Tsoiotsi Tsogalii (Lodge #70) is a lodge in the Order of the Arrow (OA), BSA's National Honor Society. The Lodge serves and is backed by the Old North State Council. Tsoiotsi Tsogalli is part of the SR-7B Section of the Southern Region of the Order of the Arrow. The Lodge's totem is the Red-tailed Hawk. Approximately 1750 Arrowmen are currently registered as members of Tsoiotsi Tsogalii.

=== History ===
The Tsoiotsi Tsogalii Lodge name means "We Three are Friends" in the Cherokee language and was formed from three smaller lodges. The first, Tali Tak Taki #70 merged with Uwharrie Lodge #208 in the early 1990s to form Keyauwee Lodge #70. This short-lived lodge then merged with Tsalagi Lodge #163 in 1994 to form Tsoiotsi Tsogalli, which still exists today.

In 2001, based on the Lodge's Service to Cub Scouting, Tsoiotsi Tsogalii received the National Service Award. This was followed by the Lodge's acceptance of the E. Urner Goodman Camping Award in 2003 and a National Service Grant in 2005, which helped construct a Health & Fitness shelter at Cherokee Scout Reservation.

=== Executive committee ===
The Lodge's leadership consists of a lodge chief and five vice chiefs elected annually by the lodge youth, of a few lodge committee chairmen, and of five chapter chiefs elected by each chapter's youth. The group meets together as the lodge's executive committee (EC) with their adult advisers at monthly meetings (no meetings usually occur in June and July). Each officer (the mentioned excluding advisers) has one vote per decision at these meetings, as does the immediately previous lodge chief. The EC is governed by the lodge bylaws and Parliamentary Procedure. Each lodge officer must be a registered lodge youth to carry out his position.

The lodge vice chief positions in order with no succession are as follows:

- Vice chief of program
- Vice chief of service
- Vice chief of communications
- Vice chief of administration
- Vice chief of Indian affairs

A trio known as the "Key 3" are allowed to make certain decisions with approval from the EC. The group consists of the lodge chief, the lodge adviser, and the lodge staff adviser.

Lodge committee chairmen are appointed and confirmed by the EC. The number of chairmen varies from year to year depending on scheduled activities and programs instituted by the EC. At the EC meetings, each chairman is granted one vote on each decision until the committee that he represents is dissolved.

=== Lodge bylaws ===
The Lodge Bylaws act as a constitution for the Lodge, forming the basis for the organization of leadership and membership. The current Bylaws were implemented under the administration of former Lodge Chief R. Martin Stamat (2007) and are divided into four articles, each dealing with a certain aspect of the Lodge. Articles I and II focus on the establishment of the Tsoiotsi Tsogalii Lodge and the qualifications for membership in the Lodge. One of the bylaws states that a member in Lodge 70 must be a registered member of the Old North State Council.

Article III briefly describes the responsibilities of all the Lodge Officers and Advisers and explains that additional temporary responsibilities may be added for Officers. The fourth Article explains the expectations of Tsoiotsi Tsogalii members at Lodge functions, and also declares that items sold by the Lodge must be either approved by Executive Committee or the leadership of the place where the items are sold.

The fifth and final Article lays out the steps necessary for amending the Bylaws document. A proposed amendment must be presented to the Executive Committee, where a motion to approve the amendment must receive two-thirds approval. Then, the proposed amendment must be presented to the Lodge membership for a majority vote before it becomes active.

=== Chapters ===
The Tsoiotsi Tsogalii Lodge is divided into 5 separate chapters, each with an elected Chapter Chief, an elected team of Vice Chiefs, and a team of appointed Advisers.

Tsoiotsi Tsogalii's Chapters are listed below along with the regions they represent:

- Alamance Chapter - represents all of Alamance County.
- Saura Chapter - represents all of Caswell County, Person County, and Rockingham.
- Dahlonega Tawodi Chapter - represents Guilford County.
- Tutelo Chapter - represents Greater High Point in Guilford County and the northeastern portion of Davidson County.
- Keyauwee Chapter - represents all of Randolph County, all of Davie County and a majority of Davidson County

=== Events ===
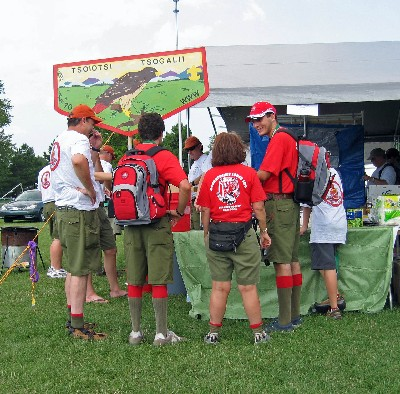
Tsoiotsi Tsogalii members at the National Order of the Arrow Conference at Michigan State University in 2006. A picket sign of the Lodge's S1 flap is shown in the background.

Each year, the Tsoiotsi Tsogalii Lodge hosts two fellowship weekends in the Spring and Fall, three induction weekends, one Vigil weekend, one Lodge Leadership Development Conference (LLDC) and many other smaller events. Approximately once every six years, the Lodge hosts the SR-7B Section Cardinal Conclave, a convention-style event where Arrowmen from all over the Section gather for fellowship and competition. Lodges compete against each other in events such as Indian dancing and the Quest for the Golden Arrow Games, which is similar to a decathlon. Tsoiotsi Tsogalii Lodge last hosted a SR-7B Conclave in 2012 at Cherokee Scout Reservation. Lodge events are most commonly held at either Cherokee Scout Reservation or Woodfield Scout Preservation.

== See also ==
- Scouting in North Carolina
