= Creston, Nebraska =

Village in Platte County, Nebraska, United States

- Village
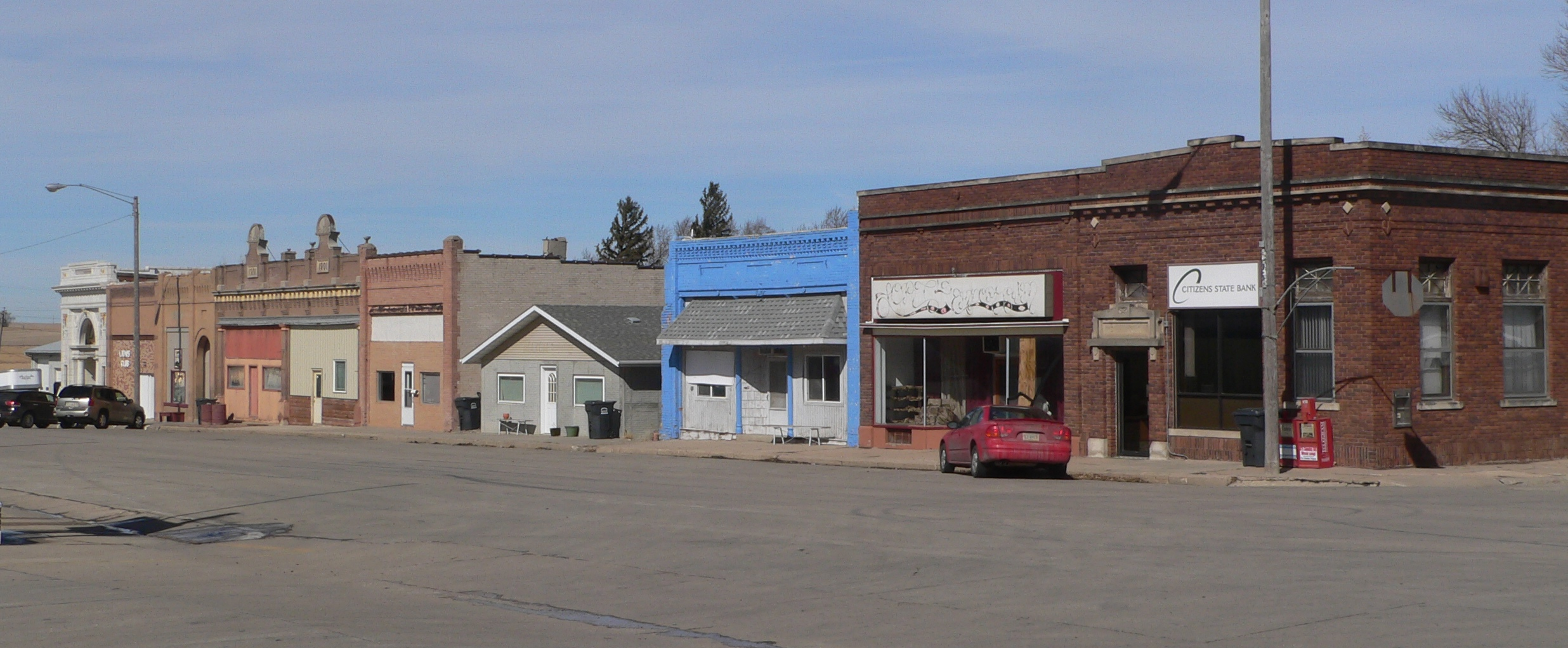
- Downtown Creston: Pine Street, March 2014

- Location of Creston, Nebraska
- Coordinates: 41°42′29″N 97°21′46″W
- Country: United States
- State: Nebraska
- County: Platte

Area
  - Total: 0.21 sq mi (0.54 km^{2})
  - Land: 0.21 sq mi (0.54 km^{2})
  - Water: 0 sq mi (0.00 km^{2})
- Elevation: 1,624 ft (495 m)

Population (2020)
  - Total: 181
  - Density: 874.9/sq mi (337.79/km^{2})
- Time zone: UTC-6 (Central (CST))
  - Summer (DST): UTC-5 (CDT)
- ZIP code: 68631
- Area code: 402
- FIPS code: 31-11300
- GNIS feature ID: 2398648

Creston is a village in Platte County, Nebraska, United States. As of the 2020 census, Creston had a population of 181.

== History ==
Creston was laid out in 1886 when the Fremont, Elkhorn and Missouri Valley Railroad was extended to that point. It was named from its lofty elevation. Creston was originally built up chiefly by Germans. The town was incorporated as a village in 1890.

== Geography ==
According to the United States Census Bureau, the village has a total area of 0.21 square miles (0.54 km^{2}), all land.

== Demographics ==
Historical population
Census	Pop.	Note	%±
1890	200		—
1900	337		68.5%
1910	338		0.3%
1920	381		12.7%
1930	346		−9.2%
1940	302		−12.7%
1950	228		−24.5%
1960	177		−22.4%
1970	171		−3.4%
1980	210		22.8%
1990	220		4.8%
2000	215		−2.3%
2010	203		−5.6%
2020	181		−10.8%
U.S. Decennial Census

=== 2010 census ===
As of the census of 2010, there were 203 people, 89 households, and 53 families residing in the village. The population density was 966.7 inhabitants per square mile (373.2/km^{2}). There were 101 housing units at an average density of 481.0 per square mile (185.7/km^{2}). The racial makeup of the village was 97.0% White, 1.5% Asian, and 1.5% from two or more races. Hispanic or Latino of any race were 1.5% of the population.

There were 89 households, of which 30.3% had children under the age of 18 living with them, 46.1% were married couples living together, 10.1% had a female householder with no husband present, 3.4% had a male householder with no wife present, and 40.4% were non-families. 37.1% of all households were made up of individuals, and 18% had someone living alone who was 65 years of age or older. The average household size was 2.28 and the average family size was 3.04.

The median age in the village was 38.5 years. 29.1% of residents were under the age of 18; 3.4% were between the ages of 18 and 24; 21.6% were from 25 to 44; 28% were from 45 to 64; and 17.7% were 65 years of age or older. The gender makeup of the village was 47.8% male and 52.2% female.

=== 2000 census ===
As of the census of 2000, there were 215 people, 96 households, and 60 families residing in the village. The population density was 1,040.6 inhabitants per square mile (401.8/km^{2}). There were 105 housing units at an average density of 508.2 per square mile (196.2/km^{2}). The racial makeup of the village was 99.07% White, 0.47% African American, and 0.47% from two or more races. Hispanic or Latino of any race were 2.33% of the population.

There were 96 households, out of which 37.5% had children under the age of 18 living with them, 46.9% were married couples living together, 10.4% had a female householder with no husband present, and 36.5% were non-families. 33.3% of all households were made up of individuals, and 16.7% had someone living alone who was 65 years of age or older. The average household size was 2.24 and the average family size was 2.87.

In the village, the population was spread out, with 28.4% under the age of 18, 5.6% from 18 to 24, 29.3% from 25 to 44, 19.1% from 45 to 64, and 17.7% who were 65 years of age or older. The median age was 38 years. For every 100 females, there were 102.8 males. For every 100 females age 18 and over, there were 108.1 males.

As of 2000 the median income for a household in the village was $27,222, and the median income for a family was $30,781. Males had a median income of $24,375 versus $23,438 for females. The per capita income for the village was $14,974. About 5.8% of families and 10.6% of the population were below the poverty line, including 15.9% of those under the age of eighteen and 11.4% of those 65 or over.

== See also ==
- List of municipalities in Nebraska
