= Humphrey Public Schools =

School district in Humphrey, Nebraska

Humphrey Public Schools is a school district that operates a single public school, Humphrey Public School, in Humphrey, Nebraska.

As of 2017, its board had nine members.
