= Platte Center, Nebraska =

Village in Platte County, Nebraska, United States

- Village
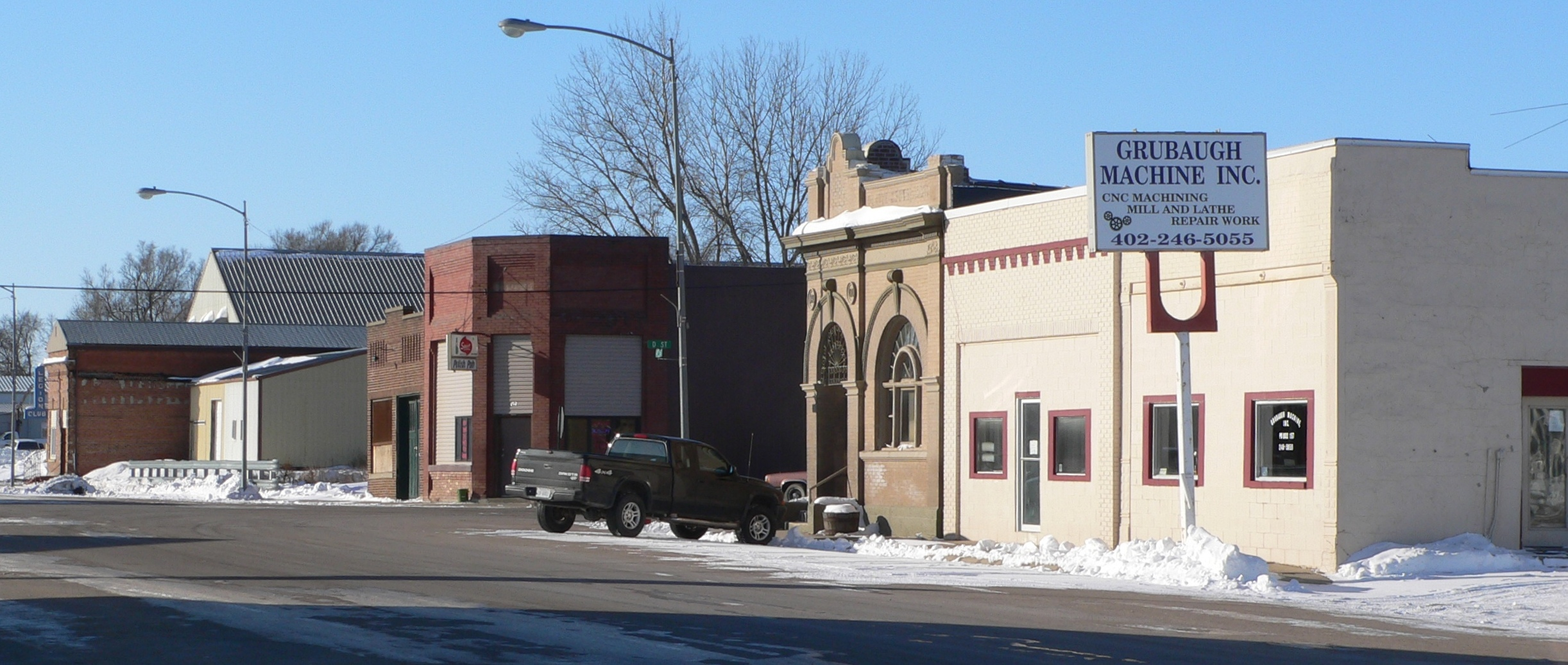
- Downtown Platte Center, December 2009

- Location of Platte Center, Nebraska
- Coordinates: 41°32′15″N 97°29′19″W
- Country: United States
- State: Nebraska
- County: Platte

Area
  - Total: 0.30 sq mi (0.78 km^{2})
  - Land: 0.30 sq mi (0.78 km^{2})
  - Water: 0 sq mi (0.00 km^{2})
- Elevation: 1,536 ft (468 m)

Population (2020)
  - Total: 333
  - Density: 1,112.2/sq mi (429.44/km^{2})
- Time zone: UTC-6 (Central (CST))
  - Summer (DST): UTC-5 (CDT)
- ZIP code: 68653
- Area code: 402
- FIPS code: 31-39310
- GNIS feature ID: 2399687
- Website: plattecenter.com

Platte Center is a village in Platte County, Nebraska, United States. As of the 2020 census, Platte Center had a population of 333.

== History ==
Platte Center was platted in 1880 by the railroad. It was named from its location near the geographical center of Platte County. Platte Center was incorporated as a village in 1885.

== Geography ==
According to the United States Census Bureau, the village has a total area of 0.30 square miles (0.78 km^{2}), all land.

== Demographics ==
Historical population
Census	Pop.	Note	%±
1880	47		—
1890	302		542.6%
1900	392		29.8%
1910	388		−1.0%
1920	464		19.6%
1930	525		13.1%
1940	509		−3.0%
1950	422		−17.1%
1960	402		−4.7%
1970	384		−4.5%
1980	367		−4.4%
1990	387		5.4%
2000	359		−7.2%
2010	336		−6.4%
2020	333		−0.9%
U.S. Decennial Census

=== 2010 census ===
As of the census of 2010, there were 336 people, 141 households, and 93 families living in the village. The population density was 1,120.0 inhabitants per square mile (432.4/km^{2}). There were 146 housing units at an average density of 486.7 per square mile (187.9/km^{2}). The racial makeup of the village was 97.0% White, 0.3% Asian, and 2.7% from two or more races. Hispanic or Latino of any race were 0.3% of the population.

There were 141 households, of which 29.8% had children under the age of 18 living with them, 53.9% were married couples living together, 7.1% had a female householder with no husband present, 5.0% had a male householder with no wife present, and 34.0% were non-families. 31.9% of all households were made up of individuals, and 14.9% had someone living alone who was 65 years of age or older. The average household size was 2.38 and the average family size was 2.97.

The median age in the village was 40.5 years. 25.9% of residents were under the age of 18; 6.2% were between the ages of 18 and 24; 23.6% were from 25 to 44; 23.9% were from 45 to 64; and 20.5% were 65 years of age or older. The gender makeup of the village was 51.8% male and 48.2% female.

=== 2000 census ===
As of the census of 2000, there were 359 people, 147 households, and 103 families living in the village. The population density was 1,202.2 inhabitants per square mile (464.2/km^{2}). There were 159 housing units at an average density of 532.5 per square mile (205.6/km^{2}). The racial makeup of the village was 97.0% White, 0.3% African American, 1.4% Asian, 0.3% from other races, and 1.1% from two or more races. Hispanic or Latino of any race were 1.1% of the population.

There were 147 households, out of which 28.6% had children under the age of 18 living with them, 63.3% were married couples living together, 4.8% had a female householder with no husband present, and 29.9% were non-families. 28.6% of all households were made up of individuals, and 14.3% had someone living alone who was 65 years of age or older. The average household size was 2.44 and the average family size was 2.95.

In the village, the population was spread out, with 25.6% under the age of 18, 6.4% from 18 to 24, 25.1% from 25 to 44, 24.5% from 45 to 64, and 18.4% who were 65 years of age or older. The median age was 39 years. For every 100 females, there were 100.6 males. For every 100 females age 18 and over, there were 97.8 males.

As of 2000 the median income for a household in the village was $35,114, and the median income for a family was $40,357. Males had a median income of $27,813 versus $20,938 for females. The per capita income for the village was $16,438. About 2.2% of families and 5.1% of the population were below the poverty line, including none of those under age 18 and 8.5% of those age 65 or over.

== Notable person ==
- General Alfred Maximilian Gruenther – World War II general and NATO's Supreme Allied Commander in Europe (SACEUR) (1953–1956)

== See also ==
- List of municipalities in Nebraska
