= Oconee, Nebraska =

Unincorporated community in Nebraska, U.S.

Coordinates: 41°28′12″N 97°31′08″W

Oconee is an unincorporated community in Platte County, Nebraska, United States.

== History ==
Oconee was originally called Lost Creek, and under the latter name was platted in 1880. The name was soon changed to Oconee, likely after Oconee, Illinois. The village in Illinois was named after the daughter of a local Indian chieftain, whose name allegedly means—or sounds like—the Shawnee language word for bone.

A post office was established at Oconee in 1887, and remained in operation until it was discontinued in 1916.
