= Occoneechee Council =

Scout Council in North Carolina

- Owner: Scouting America
- Headquarters: Raleigh, North Carolina
- Country: United States

The Occoneechee Council (421) of Scouting America serves some 8,200 youths and 4,600 adults in central North Carolina, US. The Occoneechee Council is the largest Scouting America council in North Carolina and serves Chatham, Cumberland, Durham, Franklin, Granville, Harnett, Lee, Moore, Orange, Vance, Wake and Warren counties. These twelve counties are divided into four districts. Besides providing administrative support for Scout troops in their council area, they also maintain three large campgrounds.

== History ==
In 1921, the Raleigh Council was formed. In 1925, it changed its name to the Wake County Council (421). In 1925, the Durham County Council (696) was formed. In 1925, the Walter Hines Page Council (423) was formed. In 1929, Wake County (421), Durham County (696), and Walter Hines Page (423) merged to become the Occoneechee Council (421).

== Organization ==
The Council headquarters is located in Raleigh, North Carolina, in the Highwoods Office Complex. Occoneechee Council operates three year-round camping properties, available for use by the units and districts of the Council and non-Scouting groups. The Occoneechee Scout Reservation, which includes Camp Durant and Camp Reeves, is a 2,400-acre (9.7 km^{2}) wilderness property in Moore County. Camp Campbell, a primitive camping facility, is located on Kerr Lake in Virginia.

The Council derives its name from the Occaneechi Indian tribe, a band of the Saponi Nation, which lived throughout the North Carolina Piedmont and still maintains a community in Hillsbourough, a town served by the Occoneechee Council.

The twelve counties that comprise the Occoneechee Council are divided into four districts as of 2021. Each district is led by a volunteer District Chairman, a volunteer District Commissioner and a professional District Executive, employed by the Occoneechee Council. The districts of the Occoneechee Council are organized as follows:

- Eno River District: Chatham, Durham, Granville, Orange, and Vance counties
- Cardinal District: Southern and western Wake County and portions of Raleigh south of I-40.
- Sandhills District: Cumberland, Harnett, Lee, Moore counties
- North Star District: Franklin and Warren counties as well northern and eastern Wake County and portions of Raleigh north of I-40.

== Finance ==
The Occoneechee Council is a 501(c)(3) non-profit corporation. The Executive Committee of the Executive Board serves as trustees and officers of the corporation. The annual budget of the Occoneechee Council is $3.5 million. Of this, $1.25 million was raised through the annual Friends of Scouting giving campaign, which, as of 2020, has been replaced with (annual membership fees - still being evaluated). The Council also participates in the annual popcorn product sale, which generates $1.5 million to support Scouting programs in the Council.

== Camps ==
=== Camp Durant ===
Camp Durant is the primary summer camping facility of the Occoneechee Council. Camp Durant is a part of the Occoneechee Scout Reservation, a 2,400-acre (9.7 km^{2}) tract in central Moore County, North Carolina. The property straddles the geographic division of the Piedmont and Sandhills regions of North Carolina.

Camp Durant operates as a full-service summer camp for the Scouts of the Occoneechee Council during the months of June, July and August. The Council currently offers five weeks of summer camp but will expand as the attendance increases.

As a result of the "Come with Us and Build Leaders" Capital Campaign, the Occoneechee Council has completed a complete renovation of the camp. The hallmark of the campaign is the completion of the 700-seat Grand Lodge Dining Hall. This fully air conditioned dining hall will seat the entire camp population at one setting, and boasts four serving lines and a full-service Trading Post and Grill below. Other facilities improvements include:

- Rawls Ecology Center
- Blue Cross Blue Shield Activity Field
- Simmons Trailblazer Area
- C. Harrison Smith Aquatics Center
- Charlie Sullivan Order of the Arrow Lodge Building
- Preston Health Lodge
- Handicrafts Area

Camp Durant has fourteen campsites, each divided into two sides. Each campsite also has a shower house, complete with three hot/cold showers and three flushing toilets. These shower houses also allow for electric power during summer camp. The entire camp has also been wired with fiber optic cables, which allows for both wired and Wireless highspeed internet connections.

=== Camp Reeves ===
Situated on the remainder of the Occoneechee Scout Reservation, Camp Reeves provides primitive facilities for unit and district camping. The camp has several large Jamboree-style camping fields, as well as unit campsites and several buildings. Camp Reeves was the original summer camp for the Occoneechee Council after the Moore County property was purchased.

=== Camp Campbell ===
Camp Campbell is the most primitive of the camping properties operated by the Occoneechee Council. Located on Kerr Lake, in Townsville, Virginia, just north of Henderson, North Carolina, Camp Campbell offers Scouting units access to Kerr Lake.

== Occoneechee Lodge ==
The Occoneechee Council is the home council of Occoneechee Lodge #104, the local branch of the Order of the Arrow, Scouting's National Honor Society. The Occoneechee Lodge has more than 2,000 members and meets several times a year at Camp Durant for fellowship and service.
