= Humphrey, Nebraska =

City in Platte County, Nebraska, United States

- City
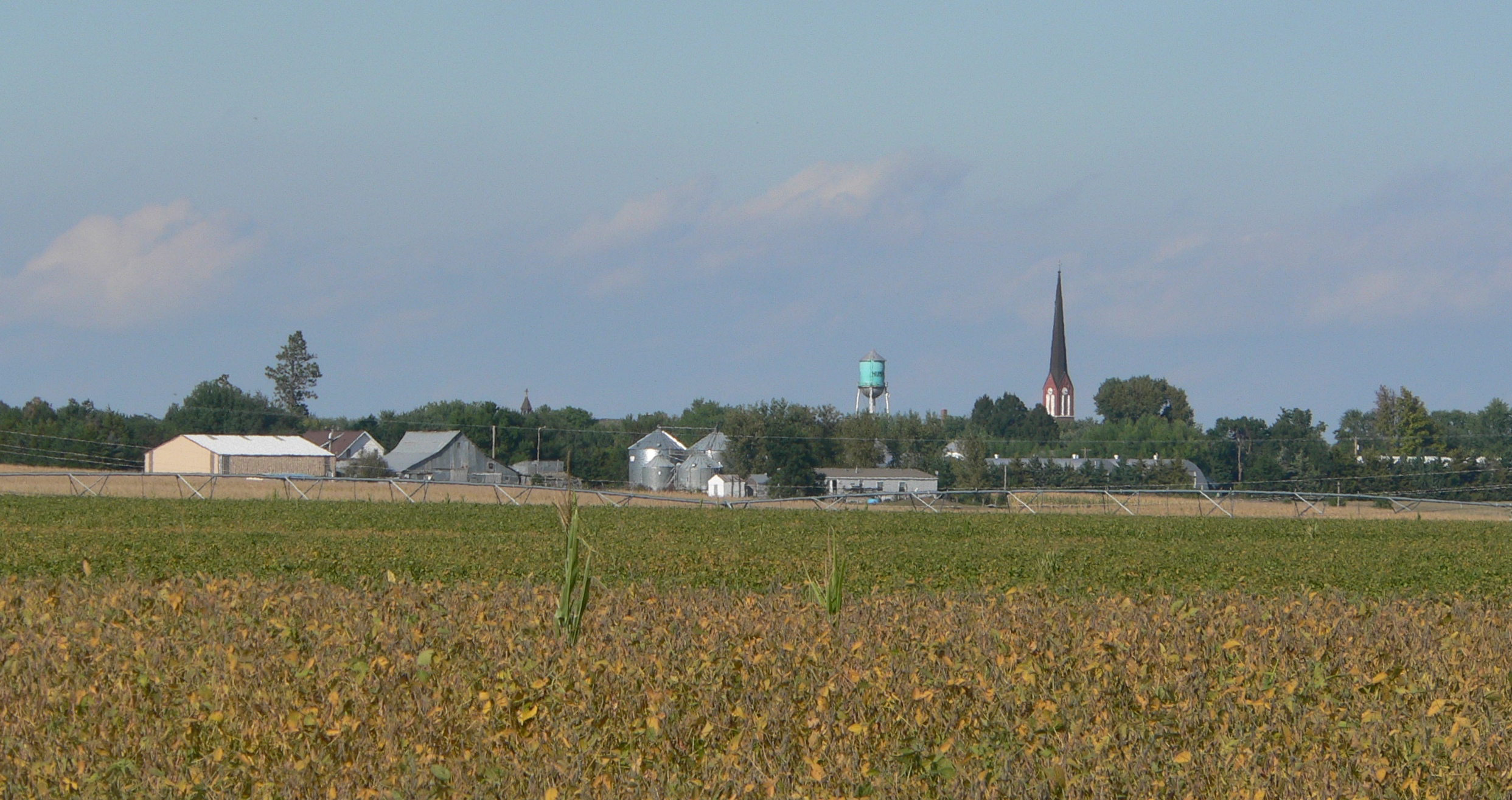
- Humphrey, seen from the southwest, September 2010

- Location of Humphrey, Nebraska
- Coordinates: 41°41′18″N 97°29′07″W
- Country: United States
- State: Nebraska
- County: Platte

Area
  - Total: 0.50 sq mi (1.29 km^{2})
  - Land: 0.49 sq mi (1.28 km^{2})
  - Water: 0.0039 sq mi (0.01 km^{2})
- Elevation: 1,670 ft (510 m)

Population (2020)
  - Total: 857
  - Density: 1,729.6/sq mi (667.79/km^{2})
- Time zone: UTC-6 (Central (CST))
  - Summer (DST): UTC-5 (CDT)
- ZIP code: 68642
- Area code: 402
- FIPS code: 31-23480
- GNIS feature ID: 2394447
- Website: www.cityofhumphrey.com

Humphrey is a city in Platte County, Nebraska, United States. As of the 2020 census, Humphrey had a population of 857.

== History ==
Humphrey was platted in 1880 when the Omaha, Niobrara and Black Hills Railroad was extended to that point. It was named after Humphrey, New York, the former hometown of the first postmaster.

== Geography ==
According to the United States Census Bureau, the city has a total area of 0.50 square miles (1.29 km^{2}), all land.

== Demographics ==
Historical population
Census	Pop.	Note	%±
1890	691		—
1900	869		25.8%
1910	868		−0.1%
1920	835		−3.8%
1930	854		2.3%
1940	841		−1.5%
1950	761		−9.5%
1960	801		5.3%
1970	862		7.6%
1980	799		−7.3%
1990	741		−7.3%
2000	786		6.1%
2010	760		−3.3%
2020	857		12.8%
U.S. Decennial Census

=== 2000 census ===
At the 2000 census there were 786 people in 317 households, including 213 families, in the city. The population density was 1,808.4 inhabitants per square mile (698.2/km^{2}). There were 328 housing units at an average density of 754.6 per square mile (291.4/km^{2}). The racial makeup of the city was 98.98% White, 0.25% African American, 0.38% Asian, 0.13% Pacific Islander, and 0.25% from two or more races. Hispanic or Latino of any race were 0.64%.

Of the 317 households 32.5% had children under the age of 18 living with them, 58.7% were married couples living together, 6.0% had a female householder with no husband present, and 32.8% were non-families. 30.9% of households were one person and 21.1% were one person aged 65 or older. The average household size was 2.47 and the average family size was 3.14.

The age distribution was 29.8% under the age of 18, 5.6% from 18 to 24, 23.7% from 25 to 44, 16.7% from 45 to 64, and 24.3% 65 or older. The median age was 39 years. For every 100 females, there were 99.0 males. For every 100 females age 18 and over, there were 88.4 males.

The median household income was $39,250, and the median family income was $46,645. Males had a median income of $32,917 versus $21,719 for females. The per capita income for the city was $18,863. About 4.8% of families and 6.3% of the population were below the poverty line, including 10.3% of those under age 18 and 5.0% of those age 65 or over.

=== 2010 census ===
At the 2010 census there were 760 people in 315 households, including 219 families, in the city. The population density was 1,520.0 inhabitants per square mile (586.9/km^{2}). There were 334 housing units at an average density of 668.0 per square mile (257.9/km^{2}). The racial makeup of the city was 98.2% White, 0.4% African American, 0.5% Native American, 0.8% from other races, and 0.1% from two or more races. Hispanic or Latino of any race were 0.7%.

Of the 315 households 31.7% had children under the age of 18 living with them, 59.4% were married couples living together, 7.6% had a female householder with no husband present, 2.5% had a male householder with no wife present, and 30.5% were non-families. 26.7% of households were one person and 15.3% were one person aged 65 or older. The average household size was 2.41 and the average family size was 2.92.

The median age was 40.6 years. 25.7% of residents were under the age of 18; 5% were between the ages of 18 and 24; 22.8% were from 25 to 44; 24% were from 45 to 64; and 22.5% were 65 or older. The gender makeup of the city was 50.8% male and 49.2% female.

== Education ==
Humphrey Public Schools operates the single public school in the town: Humphrey Public School.

== Transportation ==
Intercity bus service to the city is provided by Express Arrow.

== Notable person ==
- Max Carl (Gronenthal), singer and songwriter for Grand Funk Railroad and .38 Special, grew up in Humphrey.

== See also ==
- List of municipalities in Nebraska
