= National Register of Historic Places listings in Platte County, Nebraska =

Location of Platte County in Nebraska

Platte County, Nebraska, United States, has 21 properties and districts listed on the National Register of Historic Places, and one former listing.

The locations of National Register properties and districts for which the latitude and longitude coordinates are included below may be seen in a map.

This National Park Service list is complete through NPS recent listings posted October 30, 2026.

== Current listings ==
	Name on the Register	Image	Date listed	Location	City or town	Description
1	Walter and Ruby Behlen House	Walter and Ruby Behlen House	March 11, 2003 (#03000108)	2555 Pershing Rd. 41°26′27″N 97°21′07″W	Columbus	
2	Citizens State Bank	Citizens State Bank	April 24, 2013 (#13000200)	204 Pine St. 41°42′25″N 97°21′49″W	Creston	
3	Columbus Commercial Historic District	Columbus Commercial Historic District	November 21, 1996 (#96001353)	Roughly bounded by 11th and 14th Sts. and 23rd and 28th Aves. 41°25′44″N 97°21′31″W	Columbus	
4	Columbus Izaak Walton League Lodge	Columbus Izaak Walton League Lodge	November 29, 2001 (#01001277)	U.S. Route 81; 41°24′27″N 97°22′09″W	Columbus	
5	Dr. Carroll D. and Lorena R. North Evans House	Dr. Carroll D. and Lorena R. North Evans House	March 14, 1991 (#91000301)	2204 14th St. 41°25′49″N 97°21′15″W	Columbus	
6	Feye Archeological Site		January 21, 1974 (#74001136)	Address Restricted	Creston	
7	First Welsh Calvinistic Methodist Church and Cemetery	First Welsh Calvinistic Methodist Church and Cemetery	June 25, 1999 (#99000762)	Platte County 385 Ave. south of 370 St. 41°35′48″N 97°37′10″W	Monroe	
8	Glur's Tavern	Glur's Tavern	July 30, 1975 (#75001100)	2301 11th St. 41°25′37″N 97°21′20″W	Columbus	
9	Frederick L. and L. Frederick Gottschalk Houses	Frederick L. and L. Frederick Gottschalk Houses	June 25, 1982 (#82003200)	2022 17th St. 41°25′59″N 97°21′08″W	Columbus	
10	Hill-Rupp Site		September 30, 1985 (#85002698)	Address Restricted	Monroe	
11	Humphrey City Hall	Humphrey City Hall	June 21, 1996 (#96000682)	407 S. 4th St. 41°41′27″N 97°29′09″W	Humphrey	
12	Hanna Larson Archeological Site		February 20, 1975 (#75001101)	Address Restricted	Monroe	
13	Lincoln Highway-Duncan West	Lincoln Highway-Duncan West	July 3, 2007 (#07000656)	North Boulevard in Duncan along rural 145th St. 41°23′31″N 97°29′14″W	Duncan and Butler Township	
14	Lincoln Highway-Gardiner Station	Lincoln Highway-Gardiner Station	July 3, 2007 (#07000655)	115th St. between 340th and 355th Aves. 41°21′40″N 97°33′30″W	Butler Township	
15	Monroe Congregational Church and New Hope Cemetery	Monroe Congregational Church and New Hope Cemetery	November 28, 1990 (#90001768)	Platte County 310 St. between 400 and 415 Aves. 41°32′28″N 97°39′06″W	Monroe	
16	Platte County Courthouse	Platte County Courthouse	January 10, 1990 (#89002217)	2610 14th St. 41°25′50″N 97°21′34″W	Columbus	
17	C. Segelke Building	C. Segelke Building	June 25, 1982 (#82004891)	1065 17th Ave. 41°25′36″N 97°20′52″W	Columbus	
18	H.E. Snyder House	H.E. Snyder House	July 10, 1986 (#86001552)	2522 16th St. 41°25′56″N 97°21′32″W	Columbus	
19	St. Michael's Catholic Church	St. Michael's Catholic Church	November 28, 1990 (#90001766)	Junction of 3rd and Cedar Sts. 41°37′00″N 97°30′15″W	Tarnov	
20	Albert and Lina Stenger House	Albert and Lina Stenger House	December 27, 2007 (#07001323)	815 Lovers Ln. 41°24′57″N 97°20′11″W	Columbus	
21	Wurdeman-Lawson Archeological Site		July 12, 1974 (#74001137)	Address Restricted	Creston	

== Former listings ==
	Name on the Register	Image	Date listed	Date removed	Location	City or town	Description
1	Columbus Loup River Bridge	Columbus Loup River Bridge	June 29, 1992 (#92000735)	December 18, 2025	U.S. Route 30 over the Loup River; 41°25′01″N 97°22′04″W	Columbus	

== See also ==
- List of National Historic Landmarks in Nebraska
- National Register of Historic Places listings in Nebraska
