= List of Carnegie libraries in Nebraska =

The following list of Carnegie libraries in Nebraska provides detailed information on United States Carnegie libraries in Nebraska, where 69 libraries were built from 68 grants (totaling $707,488) awarded by the Carnegie Corporation of New York from 1899 to 1917.

== Key ==
Building still operating as a library
Building standing, but now serving another purpose
Building no longer standing
Building listed on the National Register of Historic Places
Building contributes to a historic district on the National Register of Historic Places

== Carnegie libraries ==
	Library	City or town	Image	Date granted	Grant amount	Location	Notes
1	Albion	Albion		Apr 8, 1907	$6,000	437 S 3rd St	
2	Alliance	Alliance		Dec 2, 1909	$10,000	204 W 4th St	The building is now the Carnegie Arts Center.
3	Alma	Alma		Dec 13, 1907	$10,000	111 S John St	
4	Arcadia	Arcadia		Mar 31, 1916	$7,000	100 S. Reynolds St.	
5	Ashland	Ashland		Mar 18, 1911	$5,500	207 N. 15th St.	The library moved to a new building in January 2015. The Carnegie library now houses the Ashland History Museum.
6	Aurora	Aurora		Dec 2, 1909	$10,000	812 12th St	
7	Beatrice	Beatrice		Mar 14, 1902	$23,000	220 N. 5th St.	Now the Chamber of Commerce and Tourist Center
8	Blair	Blair		Mar 31, 1916	$10,000	Built at corner of 5th and Lincoln St. In 1958 5th St was renamed 17th St.	1973 – Destroyed after a fire
9	Bloomfield	Bloomfield		Jan 2, 1913	$5,000		
10	Broken Bow	Broken Bow		Jul 23, 1914	$10,000	255 S. 10th St.	
11	Burwell	Burwell		May 21, 1913	$5,000	110 S. 7th Ave.	
12	Chadron	Chadron		Apr 16, 1910	$5,788	507 Bordeaux St.	
13	Clarks	Clarks		May 3, 1917	$7,500	101 W Amity St	
14	Clay Center	Clay Center		Jan 6, 1915	$7,000	117 W Edgar St	
15	College View	College View		Sep 25, 1914	$7,500	3800 S. 48th St.	
16	Columbus	Columbus		Aug 11, 1913	$13,000	1470 25th Ave	Designed by local architect Charles Wurdeman
17	Cozad	Cozad		Sep 14, 1917	$6,000		
18	Crete	Crete		Aug 11, 1913	$10,000	305 East 13th Street, Crete, Nebraska 68333	Expanded and remodeled in the 1990s. The library moved into a new building on January 30, 2020. The Carnegie library was demolished that same year.
19	David City	David City		Nov 9, 1916	$10,000	360 E St	
20	Dewitt	De Witt		Nov 14, 1906	$3,000		
21	Fairbury	Fairbury		Dec 24, 1907	$12,500	601 7th St.	
22	Fairfield	Fairfield		Jan 9, 1913	$6,000	412 N. D St.	
23	Franklin	Franklin		Sep 29, 1915	$5,000	1401 L St	
24	Fremont	Fremont		Dec 30, 1901	15000	Southeast corner of Military and Park	
25	Fullerton	Fullerton		Jul 13, 1912	$6,000	402 Fuller St	
26	Geneva	Geneva		Jan 31, 1911	$8,000	1043 G St	
27	Gibbon	Gibbon		May 17, 1912	$6,000		
28	Gothenburg	Gothenburg		Jan 14, 1914	$8,000	1104 Lake Av	
29	Grand Island	Grand Island		Apr 26, 1902	$20,000	321 W. 2nd St.	
30	Hartington	Hartington		Mar 11, 1914	$8,000	106 S Broadway	
31	Harvard	Harvard		Jun 11, 1914	$6,000	309 N Clay Ave	
32	Hastings	Hastings		Dec 27, 1902	$15,000	Southeast corner of Denver Ave and 4th street	
33	Havelock	Havelock		Mar 24, 1906	$7,000	4308 N 63rd	
34	Holdrege	Holdrege		Nov 16, 1904	$8,500	604 East Av	
35	Kearney	Kearney		Jan 13, 1903	$12,000	Southwest corner of 21st St and 1st Ave	
36	Lexington	Lexington		Nov 9, 1916	$10,000	705 N Washington St	
37	Lincoln Main	Lincoln		Dec 20, 1899	$87,000	136 South 14th Street	
38	Lincoln Branch	Lincoln		Dec 20, 1899	$10,000	2121 N 27th St	The library was built at the SW corner of 27th & Orchard Street. In 1992 it was moved to the current location.
39	Loup City	Loup City		Mar 31, 1916	$8,000	652 N St.	
40	Madison	Madison		Jan 31, 1911	$6,000	W 3rd and Kent	
41	McCook	McCook		Dec 8, 1905	$11,000	423 Norris Ave.	
42	Neligh	Neligh		Dec 14, 1908	$5,000	510 Main Street	
43	Norfolk	Norfolk		Dec 13, 1907	$10,000	803 W. Norfolk Ave.	
44	North Bend	North Bend		Dec 7, 1911	$7,500	140 E. 8th St.	
45	North Platte	North Platte		Apr 8, 1910	$12,000	314 N Jeffers St	
46	O'Neill	O'Neill		May 17, 1912	$10,000	601 E Douglas	
47	Pawnee City	Pawnee City		Dec 30, 1904	$7,000	730 G St.	The library moved to a new building in 2011.
48	Pierce	Pierce		Mar 29, 1911	$4,000	200 E Willow St	
49	Plainview	Plainview		Dec 3, 1915	$6,000	102 S. Main St.	The library moved to a new building in June 2016.
50	Plattsmouth	Plattsmouth		Jun 1, 1915	$12,500	401 Avenue A	
51	Ponca	Ponca		Apr 25, 1911	$4,500	203 2nd St	
52	Randolph	Randolph		Nov 9, 1916	$6,000		The library was razed in 2007 and a new library built at the same location
53	Ravenna	Ravenna		Nov 9, 1916	$7,500	121 W Seneca St	The library moved to a new building in July 2018.
54	Schuyler	Schuyler		Mar 29, 1911	$9,000	1003 B St.	Demolished in 2022.
55	Scottsbluff	Scottsbluff		Jun 6, 1917	$15,000	106 E. 18th St.	
56	Seward	Seward		Apr 3, 1912	$8,000	204 S 5th St	
57	Shelton	Shelton		Apr 2, 1913	$9,000	313 C St	
58	Sidney	Sidney		Jul 9, 1913	$6,500	740 Illinois St.	
59	South Omaha	Omaha		Jun 21, 1901	$50,000	2302 M Street	Located in the former city of South Omaha. The Carnegie building was razed in 1954 and a new building was built in its place. Today's location is a partnership with Metropolitan Community College.
60	Spencer	Spencer		Dec 3, 1915	$8,000	110 W Main	
61	Stanton	Stanton		Apr 13, 1914	$8,000	1009 Jackpine St.	
62	Stromsburg	Stromsburg		Mar 16, 1915	$7,500	5th and Commercial	
63	Superior	Superior		Dec 24, 1907	$7,000	354 N Commercial Ave	
64	Sutton	Sutton		Feb 1, 1909	$5,700		
65	Tecumseh	Tecumseh		Nov 14, 1906	$6,000	136 N 5th St	
66	Tekamah	Tekamah		Nov 17, 1914	$8,000	204 S. 13th St.	
67	University Place	University Place		Mar 16, 1915	$12,500	2820 N 48th St	
68	Wayne	Wayne		Jan 6, 1911	$9,000	410 Main St	
69	Wymore	Wymore		Sep 25, 1914	$10,000	116 W F St	

== See also ==
- List of libraries in the United States
