= List of churches in the Roman Catholic Archdiocese of Omaha =

This is a list of churches in the Roman Catholic Archdiocese of Omaha in Nebraska in the United States. It includes both active and closed parishes.

The archdiocese in 2018 announced the consolidation of numerous parishes in its Central and South Deaneries

== Metro parishes ==
=== Metro Central Deanery ===
The Metro Central Deanery contains only parishes in the City of Omaha.

Parish name	Image	Address	Description
St. Cecilia Cathedral		715 N 40th St, Omaha	Started in 1905, it was consecrated in 1959. It is the third cathedral in Omaha
St. Leo the Great		1920 N 102nd St, Omaha	
St. Bernard		3601 N 65th St, Omaha	Founded in 1905
St. Robert Bellarmine		11802 Pacific St, Omaha	Founded in 1966, church dedicated in 1968
Christ the King		654 S 86th St, Omaha	Founded in 1953, current church dedicated in 1961
Mary Our Queen		3535 S 119th St, Omaha	Founded in 1963
St. John Vianney		5801 Oak Hills Dr. Omaha	Founded in 1966. church completed in 1979
St. Joan of Arc		3122 S 74th St, Omaha	Founded in 1958. Now part of Midtown Catholic
St. Thomas More		4804 Grover St, Omaha	Founded in 1958. Now part of Midtown Catholic
St. Andrew Kim Taegon		2617 S 31st St, Omaha	
Our Lady of Lourdes-St. Adalbert		2110 S 32nd Ave, Omaha	Our Lady founded in 1918. Merged with St. Adalbert in 2014
Holy Cross		4803 William St, Omaha	Founded in 1920, current church dedicated in 1955
St. Margaret Mary		6116 Dodge St, Omaha	Founded in 1919
St. Pius X		6905 Blondo St, Omaha	Founded in 1954, current church dedicated that same year

=== Metro East Deanery ===
The Metro East Deanery contains parishes mainly in Omaha, with parishes also in Blair, Calhoun and Tekamah.

Parish name	Image	Address	Description
Holy Name		2901 Fontenelle Blvd, Omaha	Church completed in 1919
Sacred Heart		2207 Wirt St, Omaha	Founded in 1890, church construction started in 1902
St. Benedict the Moor		2423 Grant St, Omaha	Founded in 1919 for African-Americans, became a parish in 1953, church dedicated in 1958
St. Frances Cabrini		1334 S 9th St, Omaha	Founded as St. Mary in 1856, became St. Philomena in 1908 and current church dedicated that same year. Parish became St. Frances Cabrini in 1961
St. Francis Borgia		2005 Davis Dr, Blair	Founded in 1886. Now part of Trinity County Parishes
St. John		2500 California St, Omaha	Church dedicated in 1888, became a parish in 1897
St. John the Baptist		215 N 13th St, Fort Calhoun	Now part of Trinity County Parishes
St. Mary Magdalene		109 S 19th St, Omaha	Founded in 1868 for German immigrants, church dedicated in 1903
St. Patrick		3428 W Hwy 32, Tekamah	Founded in 1889, church dedicated in 1927. Now part of Trinity County Parishes
St. Peter		709 S 28th St, Omaha	
St. Philip Neri-Blessed Sacrament		8200 N 30th St, Omaha	Blessed Sacrament was founded in 1919, closed in 2014. St. Philip Neri was founded in 1904
Our Lady of Fatima		709 S 28th St, Omaha	Worship services moved to St. Stanislaus Church
St. Joseph		1723 S 17th St, Omaha	Founded as a mission for German immigrants in 1884, current church dedicated in 1916
Immaculate Conception Church		2708 S 24th St, Omaha	Founded in 1900, current church dedicated in 1926. Operated by the Priestly Fraternity of St. Peter
St. Bridget-St. Rose		4112 S 26th St, Omaha	Now merged with St. Stanislaus Church
St. Francis of Assisi		4521 S 32nd St, Omaha	Founded as St. Francis de Paula in 1898 for Polish immigrants, current church dedicated in 1909 as St. Francis Assisi
Assumption-Guadalupe		5434 S 22nd St, Omaha	Our Lady was founded in 1918 for Mexican immigrants. Church dedicated in 1951
St. Mary		3529 Q St, Omaha	Now merged with Ss. Peter and Paul Parish
Ss. Peter & Paul		5912 S 36th St, Omaha	Founded in 1907 for Croatian immigrants, current church dedicated in 1967
St. Stanislaus		4002 J St, Omaha	Founded in 1919 for Polish immigrants, current church dedicated in 1955

=== Metro Northwest Deanery ===
The Metro Northwest Deanery contains parishes in Omaha and one parish in Valley.

Parish name	Image	Address	Description
St. John the Evangelist		307 E Meigs St, Valley	
St. Patrick		107 W. Walworth St, Omaha	Founded as a mission in 1900, current church dedicated in 1982
St. Stephen the Martyr		16701 S St, Omaha	Founded in 1989, church dedicated in 1991, largest parish in Nebraska
St. Wenceslaus		15353 Pacific St, Omaha	Founded in 1877 for Czech immigrants, current church dedicated in 2021
Dowd Memorial Chapel		13943 Dowd Dr, Boys Town	Constructed in 1941 to serve the Boys Town community
St. Elizabeth Ann Seton		5419 N 114th St, Omaha	Founded in 1981, current church dedicated in 1984
St. James		9025 Larimore Ave, Omaha	Founded in 1963, current church dedicated in 2002
St. Vincent de Paul		14330 Eagle Run Dr, Omaha	Founded in 1991, church completed in 1996

=== Metro South Deanery ===
The Metro South Deanery contains parishes in Omaha, Bellevue, Grenta and other communities.

Parish name	Image	Address	Description
St, Patrick		508 W Angus Rd, Grenta	Founded in 1858 for Irish immigrants, current church completed in 2001
St. Charles Borromeo		7790 South 192nd St, Gretna	Founded in 2005, church dedicated in 2010
St. Joseph		100 9th St, Springfield	
St. Gerald		9602 Q St, Ralston	Founded in 1959, current church dedicated in 1995
St. Columbkille		200 East 6th St, Papillion	Founded in 1878, current church dedicated in 1982
Holy Ghost & St. Bernadette		5219 S 53rd St, Omaha	Holy Ghost was founded in 1918, current church dedicated in 1951 St. Bernadette was founded in 1953, current church dedicated in 1966
St. Matthew the Evangelist		12210 So. 36 St, Bellevue	Founded in 1996
St. Mary		2302 Crawford St, Bellevue	Founded in 1921, current church dedicated in 1957

== Rural parishes ==
The Archdiocese of Omaha has grouped most of its rural parishes into family groups to deal with the shortage of priests and to save money on administrative costs.

=== Rural Central Deanery ===
The Rural Central Deanery contains three family groups:

- Catholic Parishes in Partnership
- Heart of Jesus Catholic Parishes
- Family of the Immaculate Conception

Parish name	Image	Address	Description
Catholic Parishes in Partnership
		Our Lady of Mount Carmel Church, 300 E 2nd St, Tilden	
		St. Bonaventure Church, 2305 S R Road, Raeville,	
		St. Boniface Church, 301 S. 2nd St, Elgin	
		St. Francis of Assisi Church, 702 W 11th St, Neligh	Church dedicated in 1963
		St. John the Baptist Church, 50898 848 Rd,Clearwater	
		St. John the Baptist Church, 201 N 4th St,Petersburg	
		St. Peter de Alcantara Church, 220 US-275, Ewing	
		St. Theresa of Avila Church, 509 Nebraska St, Clearwater	
Heart of Jesus Catholic Parishes
		Sacred Heart Church, 200 S 5th St, Norfolk	Founded in 1881, current church dedicated in 1899
		St. Joseph Church, 118 W Willow, Pierce	Founded as a mission in the late 1800s, current church dedicated in 1903, became a parish in 1905
		St. Leonard Church, 504 Nebraska St, Madison	Founded in 1879, current church dedicated in 1913
		St. Patrick Church, 109 N 3rd St, Battle Creek	Founded in 1874, current church dedicated in 1902
		St. Peter Church, 1504 Ivy St, Stanton	Founded in 1893, current church dedicated in 1970
Family of the Immaculate Conception
		St. Anne Church, 510 S Wilbur St, Dixon	
		St. Mary Church, 408 Elm St, Laurel	
		St. Mary Church, 412 E 8th St, Wayne	

=== Rural East Deanery ===
The Rural East Deanery contains three family groups:

- Holy Apostles Parish Family
- St. Joseph Family of Parishes
- Padre Pio Family Parish Group

Parish name	Image	Address	Description
Holy Apostles Parish Family
		Holy Cross Church, 501 Park St, Bancroft	Founded in 1882
		Holy Family Church, 703 4th Ave, Decatur	Founded in 1880
		Our Lady of Fatima Church, 462 Elk St, Macy	
		Sacred Heart Church, 601 Main St, Emerson	
		St. Augustine Church, 705 S. Mission Dr, Winnebago	Founded in 1909 as part of the St. Augustine Indian Mission, established by Katharine Drexel
		St. Cornelius Church, 410 3rd St, Homer	Founded in 1889, current church dedicated in 1957
		St. John the Baptist Church, 1976 Main St, Pender	
		St. Joseph Church, 430 Lincoln St, Lyons	Founded in 1884
		St. Joseph Church, 501 Main St, Walthill	Church dedicated in 1919
		St. Mary Queen of the Apostles Church, 211 Iowa St, Hubbard	Founded in 1886
		St. Michael Church, 1315 1st Ave, South Sioux City	
		St. Patrick Church, 119 Elk St, Jackson	Founded in 1858
St. Joseph Family of Parishes
		Holy Cross Church, 517 Fraisier Street, Beemer	Church dedicated in 1914. Shares pastor with St. Joseph Parish in Lyons since 2005.
		Sacred Heart Church, 731 2nd St, Dodge	
		St. Aloysius Church, 700 Hwy 32, West Point	
		St. Anthony Church, 413 15th Rd, West Point	
		St. Boniface Church, 450 12th Rd, West Point	
		St. John Nepomucene Church, 323 S 2nd St, Howells	
		St. Joseph Church, 1308 Ave G W, Wisner	Founded as a mission in 1879, became a parish in 1893, church completed in 1924. Shares pastor with Holy Cross Parish in Beemer since 2005
		St. Mary Church, 343 N Monitor St, West Point,	
		Ss. Peter & Paul Church,112 6th St, Howells	
		St. Wenceslaus Church, 731 2nd St Dodge	Founded in 1883, current church dedicated in 1956
Padre Pio Family Parish Group
		St. Charles Borromeo Church, 740 Locust St, North Bend	
		St. Lawrence Church, 910 Grant St, Scribner	
		St. Leo Church, 3400 E 16th Street, Fremont	Founded in 1868, current church dedicated in 2001
		St. Patrick, 3400 East 16th St, Fremont,	Founded in 1869, current church dedicated in 2001
		St. Rose of Lima, 406 E Elk St, Hooper	

=== Rural Northwest Deanery ===
The Rural NortHwest Deanery contains several family groups:

- Catholic Parishes of Western Holt and Boyd Counties
- Holy Angels Parish
- Holy Spirit Catholic Parishes
- Sacred Heart Parishes of Boyd County

All Saints Parish and Holy Angels Parish also belong to Our Catholic Family of Parishes. Sacred Heart Parishes of Boyd County are also part of Catholic Parishes of Western Holt and Boyde Counties.

Parish name	Image	Address	Description
All Saints Parish – founded in 2018 as a cluster of churches. Part of Our Catholic Family of Parishes
		St. John the Baptist Church, 311 Omaha St, Fordyce	Now part of All Saints Parish
		St. Joseph Church, 88870 554 Ave, Constance	Now part of All Saints Parish
Catholic Parishes of Western Holt and Boyd Counties
		St. Boniface Church, 106 E 4th St, Stuart	Founded in 1896, current church dedicated in 1912.
		St Joseph Church, 104 S Tuller St, Atkinson	
		St. Joseph Mission Church, 85632 Ivy Ave, Amelia	Mission of St. Patrick Church.
		St. Patrick Church, 330 E Benton St, O'Neill	Founded in 1877
Holy Angels Parish – part of Our Catholic Family of Parishes
		St. Andrew Church, 304 S McNamara St Bloomfield	Now part of Holy Angels Parish
		St. Ludger Church, 410 Bryant Ave, Creighton	Now part of Holy Angels Parish
		St. Wenceslaus Church 211 4th St, Verdigre	Now part of Holy Angels Parish
		St. William Church, 262 Buckeye Rd, Niobrara	Mission of St. Wencesles Church. Now part of Angels Family Parish
		St. Ignatius Church 407 Franklin St, Brunswick	Now part of Angels Family Parish
Holy Spirit Catholic Parishes
		Holy Trinity Church, 106 W 889 Rd, Hartington	Founded in 1883, became a parish in 1887, church dedicated in 1901.Now part of Holy Spirit Parishes
		St. Frances de Chantal Church, 403 N. Bridge St, Randolph	Founded in 1890s, current church dedicated in 1917. Now part of Holy Spirit Parishes
		St. Joseph Church, Ponca	Founded in 1890, current church dedicated in 1956. Now part of Holy Spirit Parishes
		St. Mary of the Seven Dolors, 208 E 5th St, Osmond	Founded as a mission in 1892, became a parish in 1904, current church dedicated in 1912. Now part of Holy Spirit Parishes
		St. Michael Church, 315 S Madison St, Coleridge	Founded as a mission in 1887, became a parish in 1905, church dedicated in 1951. Now part of Holy Spirit Parishes
		St. Paul Church, 205 East Park, Plainview	Founded in 1902, current church dedicated in 1925. Now part of Holy Spirit Parishes
		St. Peter Church, 403 Annie St, Newcastle,	Founded in 1873, became a parish in 1877, current church dedicated in 1955. Now part of Holy Spirit Parishes
Sacred Heart Parishes of Boyd County – part of Catholic Parishes of Western Holt and Boyd Counties
		Ss. Peter & Paul Church, 921 Gale St, Butte	Now part of Sacred Heart Parishes
		Assumption of the Blessed Virgin Mary Church, 417 S 4th St, Lynch	Now part of Sacred Heart Parishes
		St. Mary Church, 304 E South St, Spencer	Now part of Sacred Heart Parishes
St. Rose of Lima		1314 W 5th St, Crofton	Part of Our Catholic Family of Parishes

=== Rural Southwest Deanery ===
The Rural Southwest Deanery has two parish groups:

- Northern Parishes of Family J
- Southern Parishes of Family J

Parish name	Image	Address	Description
Divine Mercy		308 W 10th St, Schuyler	Founded in 2008 with the merger of St. Augustine and St. Mary Parishes
Holy Family		103 3rd St, Lindsay	
Holy Trinity		1733 Rd 12, Clarkson	Founded in 1880
Northern Parishes of Family J
		St. Anthony Church, 508 West Main St, Cedar Rapids	Founded in 1888, current church dedicated in 1919
		St. Edward Church, 805 Washington St, St. Edward	
		St. Michael Church, 524 W Church St, Albion	Founded in 1876, current church dedicated in 1908
Southern Parishes of Family J
		St. Lawrence Church 407 Vine St, Silver Creek	
		St. Michael Church, 2402 20th Ave, Central City	
		St. Peter Church, 425 Amity St, Clarks	Founded as a mission in the 1860s, church dedicated in 1927
		St. Peter Church, 315 N Esther St, Fullerton	Founded as a mission in 1887, church completed in 1923
		Ss. Peter & Paul Church, 52121 S 380th Ave, Genoa	
		St. Rose of Lima Church, 116 N Elm St, Genoa	
St. Anthony		562 17th Ave, Columbus	
St. Bonaventure		1565 18th Ave, Columbus	Founded in 1860, current church started in 1883
Ss. Cyril & Methodius		120 Cherry St, Clarkson	
St. Francis of Assisi		203 S 5th St, Humphrey	Founded in 1882, current church dedicated in 1894
St. Isidore		3921 20th St, Columbus	Founded in 1963, current church dedicated in 2007
St. Joseph		155 A St, Platte Center	Founded in 1884, church dedicated in 1924
St. Mary		319 N Oak St, Leigh	Founded in 1900, current church dedicated in 1969
St. Michael		309 3rd St, Tarnov	Founded in 1901
St. Stanislaus		1120 8th St, Duncan	Founded in 1881 for Polish immigrants, current church completed in 1939

== Closed parishes ==
Parish name	Image	Address	Description
Holy Family		1715 Izard St, Omaha	Founded in 1883, closed in 2020
Mother of Perpetual Help		5215 Seward St, Omaha	Closed
St. Agnes		2215 Q St, Omaha	Founded in 1886, church dedicated in 1889. Closed in 2017 and sold
St. Anthony		5401 S 33rd St, Omaha	Founded in 1901 for Lithuanian immigrants, current church dedicated in 1936. Closed in 2014
St. Patrick		1404 Castelar St, Omaha	Founded in 1883, closed in 2014
St. Richard		4320 Fort St, Omaha	Founded in 1961, closed in 1993
St. Therese of the Child Jesus		2423 Grant St, Omaha	Founded in 1917, church completed in 1927, closed in 2013

== See also ==
Roman Catholic Archdiocese of Omaha
