= Snyder House =

Snyder House may refer to:

in Canada

- Snyder House, Toronto, Oldest surviving house in North Toronto, c. 1820

in the United States

(by state then city)

- Snyder House (Little Rock, Arkansas), listed on the National Register of Historic Places (NRHP)
- Yewell-Snyder House, Brownsboro, Kentucky, listed on the NRHP in Oldham County
- Snyder House (Bastrop, Louisiana), listed on the NRHP in Morehouse Parish
- Snyder House (Kalispell, Montana), listed on the NRHP in Flathead County
- H.E. Snyder House, Columbus, Nebraska, listed on the NRHP in Platte County
- John Wesley Snyder House, Winston-Salem, North Carolina, listed on the NRHP
- William Penn Snyder House, Pittsburgh, Pennsylvania, listed on the NRHP
- Gov. Simon Snyder Mansion, Selinsgrove, Pennsylvania, listed on the NRHP
- Wetherby-Hampton-Snyder-Wilson-Erdman Log House, Tredyffrin, Pennsylvania, listed on the NRHP in Chester County
- L.E. Snyder House, Onida, South Dakota, listed on the NRHP in Sully County
- Fred and Annie Snyder House, Lubbock, Texas, listed on the NRHP in Lubbock County
- Wilson I. Snyder House, Park City Utah, listed on the NRHP in Summit County
- Noah Snyder Farm, Lahmansville, West Virginia, listed on the NRHP
- Benjamin H. Snyder House, Martinsburg, West Virginia, listed on the NRHP
