= Charles Wurdeman =

American architect

Charles H. Wurdeman (1871-1961) was an architect and builder based in Columbus, Nebraska. Several of his works are listed on the National Register of Historic Places (NRHP).

== Life ==
Wurdeman was born in Sherman Township, Platte County, Nebraska, on January 28, 1871. He graduated from the University of Illinois.

Wurdeman worked for 60 years as a builder and/or architect. He created a type of reinforced concrete using crushed local flint rock and cement from Holland. From 1945 to 1959, he was a partner in Wurdeman and Wurdeman, an architectural firm he co-founded with his son, Harold Wurdeman.

Wurdeman died July 1, 1961, in Columbus.

== Works ==
Works by Charles Wurdeman include:

- Dr. Carroll D. and Lorena R. North Evans House (1908), 2204 14th St., Columbus, Nebraska, NRHP-listed.
- L. Frederick Gottschalk House (1911), 2022 17th St., Columbus, NRHP-listed.
- Columbus Carnegie Library (1913-1915), 1470 25th Ave., Columbus (Note: Address as stated in List of Carnegie libraries in Nebraska. At that address, per Google Streetview image capture August 2012, stands a law offices building which is clearly the historic library, or at least its original front facade, plus additions.)
- St. Stanislaus Parochial School (1914-1915), Duncan, Nebraska
- Platte County Courthouse (Nebraska) (1920–22), 2610 14th St., Columbus, NRHP-listed.
- Assumption School (1920–21)
- St Bernard's School (1923), rural Platte County, Nebraska
- Grotto (1926–27) of St. Michael's Catholic Church (Tarnov, Nebraska), jct. of Third & Cedar Sts., Tarnov, Nebraska, NRHP-listed.

== Successor firms ==
A successor firm Reed, Wurdeman & Associates', with partners Raymond H. Reed and Harold C. Wurdeman, to which Charles H. Wurdeman consulted, continued to 1969. The continuing firm changed its name to Reed, Veach and Wurdeman Associates in 1969, and evolved into telecommunications engineering and billing. In 1996 it became RVW, Inc. and absorbed the firm of Scheiddegger Engineering Company. In 2019 it is still headquartered in Columbus and provides professional services in several areas, still including architectural planning and design.
