= Madison Public Library =

Madison Public Library may refer to:

- Madison Public Library (Maine), listed on the National Register of Historic Places (NRHP) in Madison, Maine
- Madison Public Library (Madison, Nebraska), public library in Madison, Nebraska
- Madison Public Library (Madison, Wisconsin), public library system in Madison, Wisconsin
- Madison Carnegie Library, Madison, Minnesota, NRHP-listed
- Madison Public Library and the James Building, Madison, New Jersey, NRHP-listed
