= Albert and Lina Stenger House =

- U.S. National Register of Historic Places
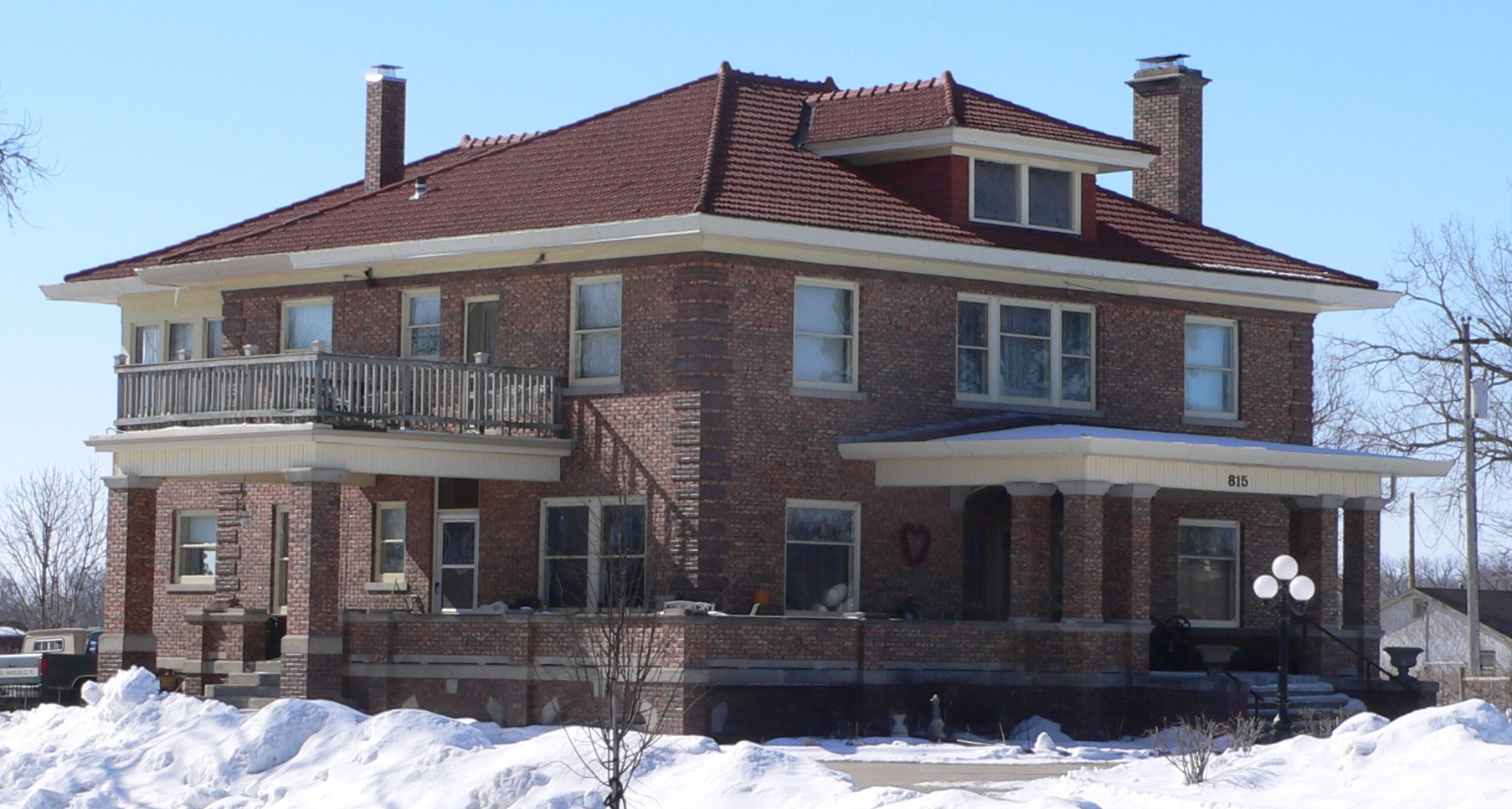
- The house in 2010

- Location within Nebraska Location within the United States
- Location: 815 Lovers Lane, Columbus, Nebraska
- Coordinates: 41°24′57″N 97°20′11″W
- Area: 2 acres (0.81 ha)
- Built: 1907
- Built by: Glur Cement Works
- Architectural style: Prairie School
- NRHP reference No.: 07001323
- Added to NRHP: December 27, 2007

The Albert and Lina Stenger House is a historic house in Columbus, Nebraska. It was built in 1907 for Albert S. Stenger, an immigrant from Alsace, and his second wife, Lina Steiner, who was an immigrant from Switzerland. They lived here with their six children and Stenger's two daughters from his first marriage. The house was designed in the Prairie School style. It remained in the Stenger family until 1948. It has been listed on the National Register of Historic Places since December 27, 2007.
