= Columbus Public Library (Columbus, Nebraska) =

Public library in Columbus, Nebraska, US

The Columbus Public Library in Columbus, Nebraska, served the city from a 33,000 square feet (3,100 m^{2}) building opened as a library in 1977 through February 2021. In spring 2021, the library relocated temporarily to the former police station at 2419 14th Street during the construction of a new building.

The library was preceded by the Columbus Carnegie Library, designed by local architect Charles Wurdeman, built during 1913–15. It was funded by a $13,000 grant from the Carnegie Foundation. The Carnegie library building, at 1470 25th Avenue, was expanded and renovated while serving as the library.

In November 2019, voters approved the development and construction of the Columbus Community Building. The plan was to erect a new facility on the north side of 14th Street east of 26th Avenue, the site of the former fire department, senior center, and old library. The project would construct a three-story building housing the new Columbus Public Library, Columbus Area Children's Museum, City Hall, and an adjacent parking lot and playground area. Additional organizations were brought in on the project, including the Columbus Area Arts Council (now Trax Creative District) and the Broken Mug Coffee Shop.

Construction was completed in March 2023, and its doors opened to the public on Saturday, July 8, of that same year.

== See also ==
- List of Carnegie libraries in Nebraska
