= Walter and Ruby Behlen House =

- U.S. National Register of Historic Places
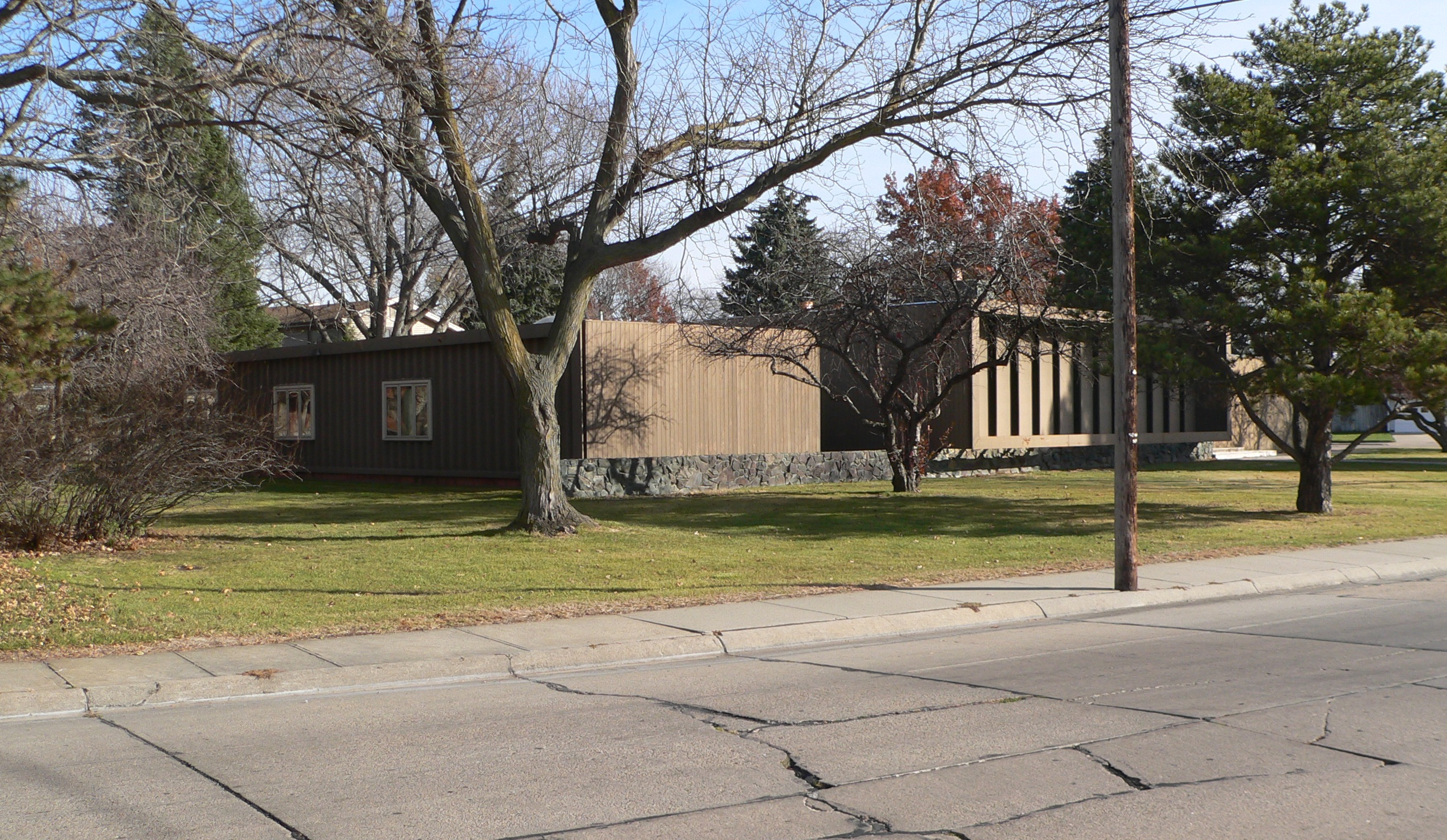
- The house in 2010

- Location within Nebraska Location within the United States
- Location: 2555 Pershing Road, Columbus, Nebraska
- Coordinates: 41°26′27″N 97°21′07″W
- Area: less than one acre
- Built: 1958
- Architect: Leo Daly architectural firm; Jack Savage
- Architectural style: Modern Movement
- NRHP reference No.: 03000108
- Added to NRHP: March 11, 2003

The Walter and Ruby Behlen House is a historic one-story house in Columbus, Nebraska. It was built in 1958 for Walter Behlen, a co-founder of the Behlen Manufacturing Company. It was designed in the Moderne style by architect Jack Savage of the Leo Daly architectural firm, and meant to be a "showcase for the potential uses of industrial materials for domestic purposes." It has been listed on the National Register of Historic Places since March 11, 2003.
