= St. Michael's Catholic Church (Tarnov, Nebraska) =

Historic church in Nebraska, United States

- U.S. National Register of Historic Places
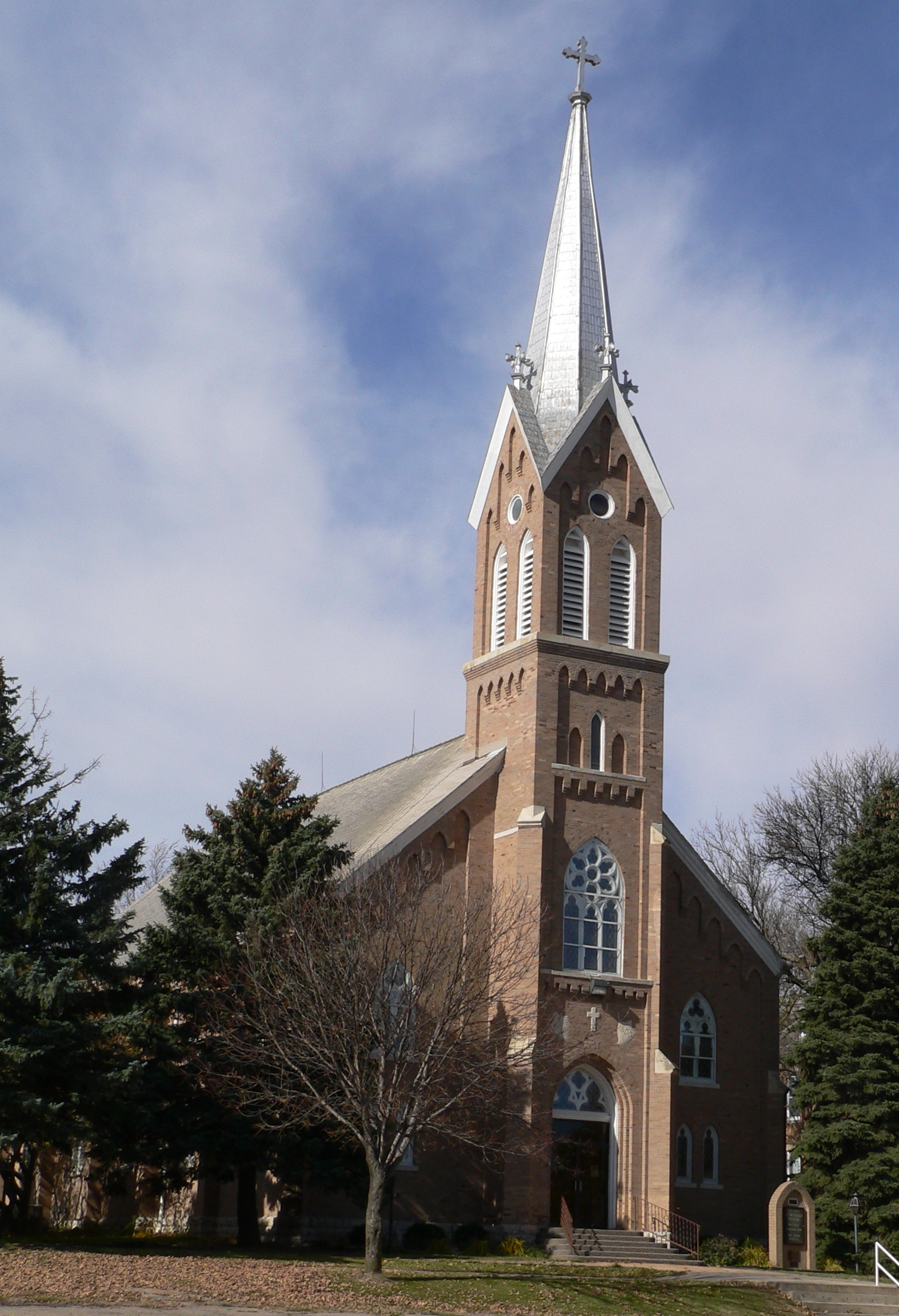
- The church in 2009

- Location within Nebraska Location within the United States
- Location: Junction of Third & Cedar Streets, Tarnov, Nebraska
- Coordinates: 41°37′00″N 97°30′15″W
- Area: 8.4 acres (3.4 ha)
- Built: 1900, 1911, 1926-27
- Architect: Leonard Darscheid; Charles Wurdeman
- Architectural style: Gothic Revival, other
- NRHP reference No.: 90001766
- Added to NRHP: November 28, 1990

St. Michael's Catholic Church is a parish of the Roman Catholic Church in Tarnov, Nebraska, within the Archdiocese of Omaha. It is noted for its historic church, located at 309 3rd Street and completed in 1901, and its adjacent cemetery, platted in 1880.

Polish immigrants arrived in the area in the late 1870s, and petitioned the bishop for a church in 1880, preceding the establishment of the town. The arrival of the Union Pacific Railroad spurred the village's growth, leading to the need for a new church. Planning for a new church began in December 1899 under Fr. A. Czech, O.F.M., on land donated by Frank and Sophia Paprocki, originally of Tarnov, Poland (then part of Austrian Galicia).

The new church was designed in the Gothic Revival style by another Franciscan, Br, Leonard Dorschied, O.F.M. Construction began in 1900 and was completed in 1901. The cost of $17,000 had been held down by the contribution of unskilled labor by parishioners, as well as through the use of brick and lumber from the 1898 Trans-Mississippi Exposition in Omaha, delivered by train. Limestone for the foundation was transported from a quarry near Florence, Kansas, and sand was brought in from the Loup River, 20 miles to the south.

The new church has a 110 feet (34 m) tall tower and steeple, with two bells weighing 600 pounds (270 kg) and 1,000 pounds (450 kg).

In the fall of 1910, the parish constructed a new rectory, school-convent, and chicken house. The school remained in operation until 1961. The church has been listed on the National Register of Historic Places since November 28, 1990.

The complex includes a grotto built in 1926-27 designed by Charles Wurdeman.
