= Dr. Carroll D. and Lorena R. North Evans House =

- U.S. National Register of Historic Places
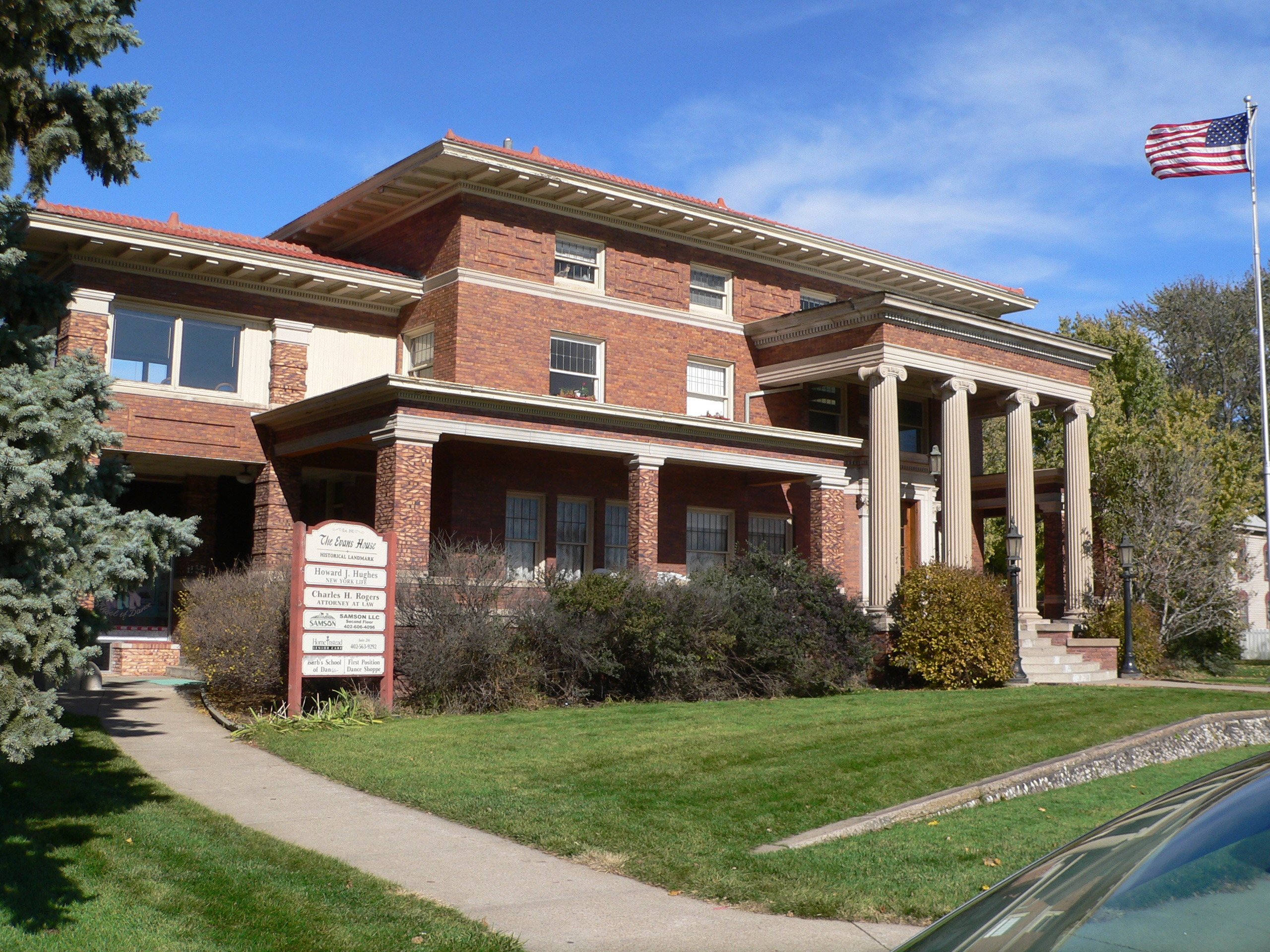
- The house in 2009

- Location within Nebraska Location within the United States
- Location: 2204 14th Street, Columbus, Nebraska
- Coordinates: 41°25′49″N 97°21′15″W
- Area: less than one acre
- Built: 1908
- Built by: Walter L. Roth
- Architect: Charles H. Wurdeman
- Architectural style: Renaissance Revival, Greek Revival, Colonial Revival, Spanish Colonial Revival
- NRHP reference No.: 91000301
- Added to NRHP: March 14, 1991

The Dr. Carroll D. and Lorena R. North Evans House is a historic house in Columbus, Nebraska. It was built by Walter L. Roth in 1908 for Carroll D. Evans, a surgeon, and his wife, née Lorena Rose North. It was designed by architect Charles H. Wurdeman in the Renaissance Revival, Greek Revival, Colonial Revival and Spanish Colonial Revival styles. It has been listed on the National Register of Historic Places since March 14, 1991.
