= Platte County Courthouse (Nebraska) =

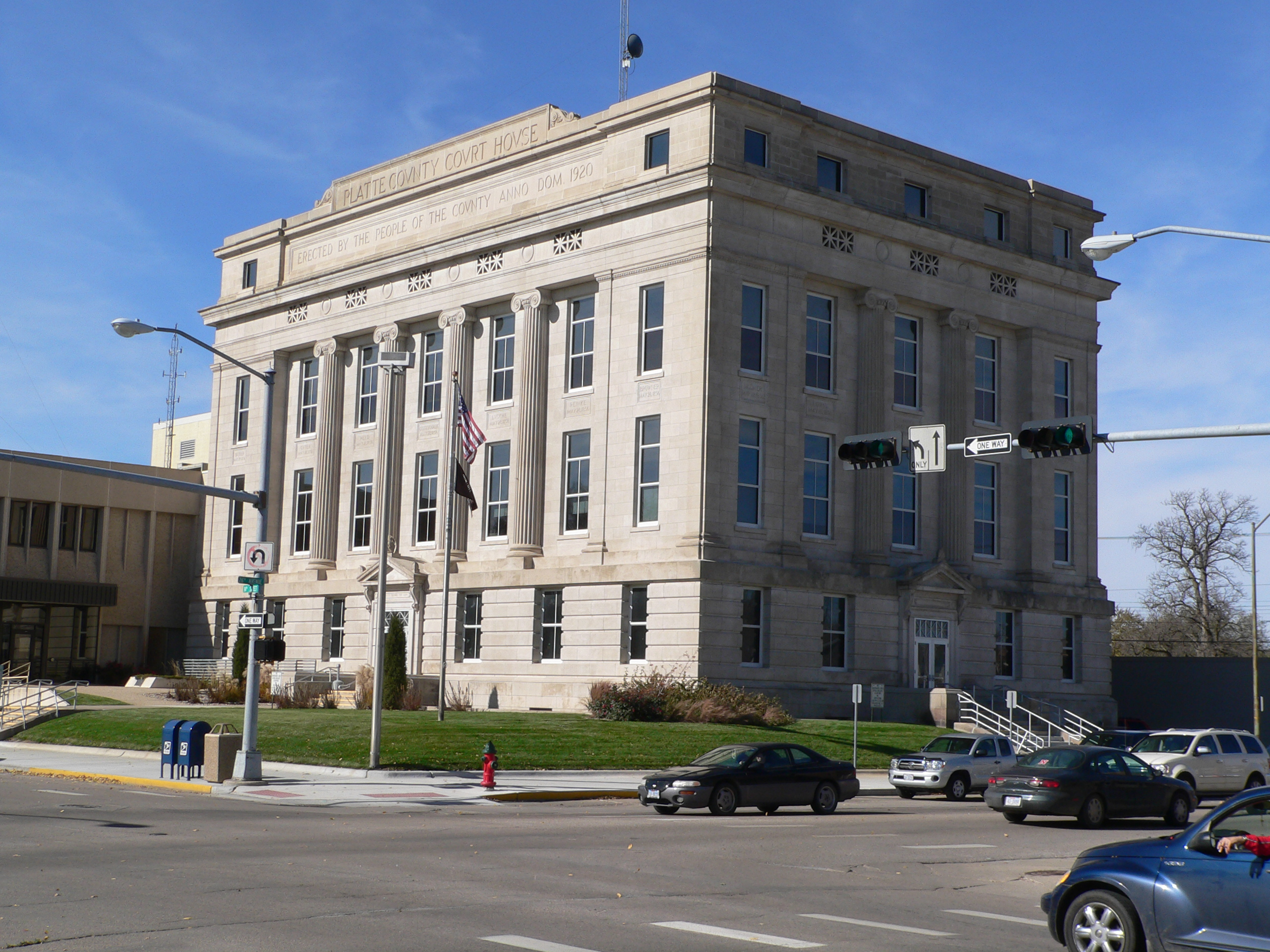
- The building in 2009
- Interactive map of the Platte County Courthouse area

General information
- Architectural style: Neoclassical
- Location: 2610 14th Street, Columbus, Nebraska
- Construction started: 1920
- Completed: 1922

Design and construction
- Architect: Charles Wurdeman
- Platte County Courthouse
- U.S. National Register of Historic Places
- Area: less than one acre
- MPS: County Courthouses of Nebraska MPS
- NRHP reference No.: 89002217
- Added to NRHP: January 10, 1990

The Platte County Courthouse is a historic three-story building in Columbus, Nebraska, and the courthouse of Platte County, Nebraska. It is the second courthouse for Platte County; the first one was built in 1868–1870. The current courthouse was built in 1920–1922, and designed in the Classical Revival style by architect Charles Wurdeman. It has been listed on the National Register of Historic Places since January 10, 1990.
