= H.E. Snyder House =

- H. E. Snyder House
- U.S. National Register of Historic Places
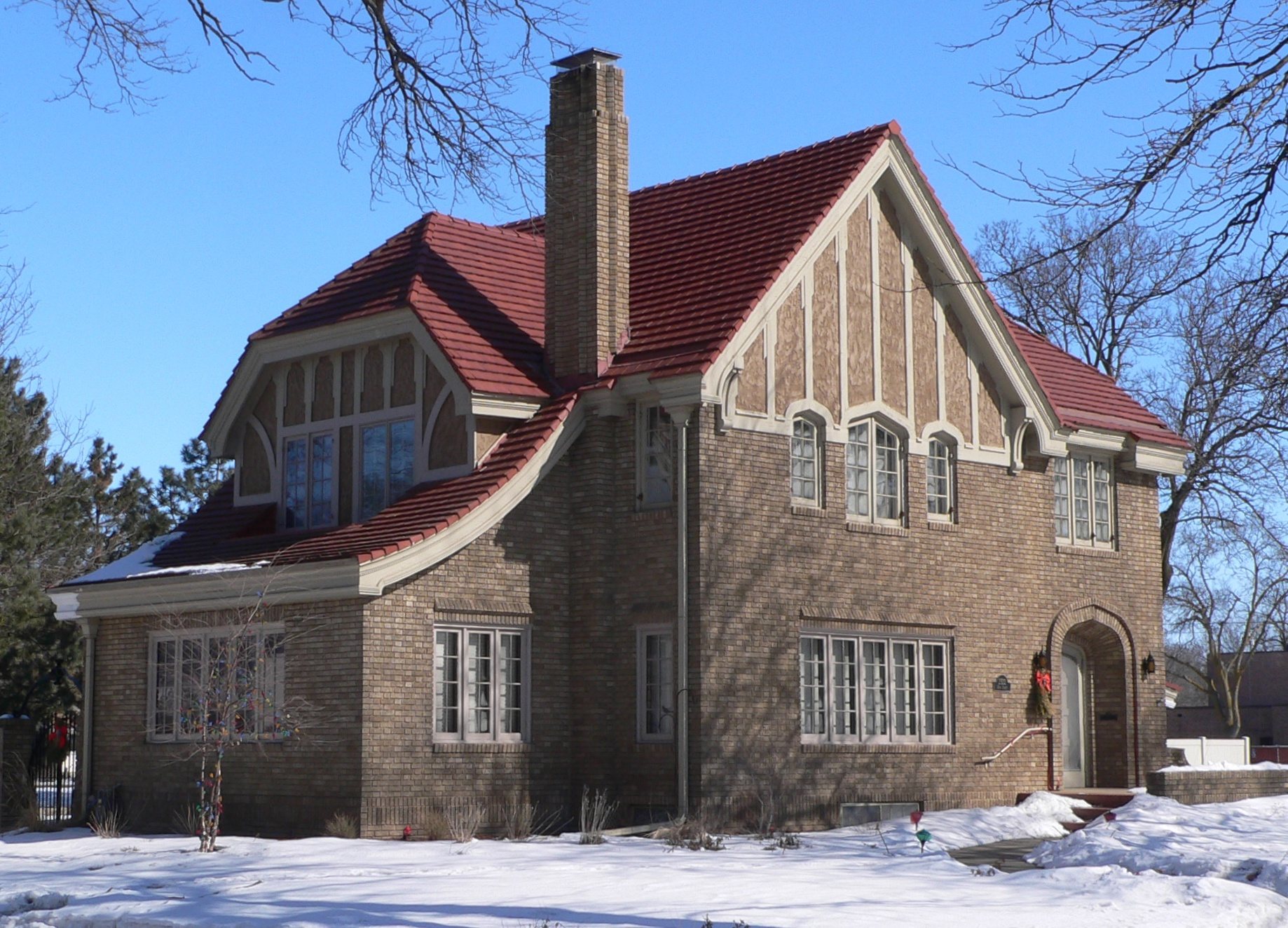
- The house in 2010

- Location within Nebraska Location within the United States
- Location: 2522 Sixteenth Street, Columbus, Nebraska
- Coordinates: 41°25′56″N 97°21′32″W
- Area: less than one acre
- Built: 1928
- Built by: George Johnsen I
- Architect: Edward J. Sessinghaus
- NRHP reference No.: 86001552
- Added to NRHP: July 10, 1986

The H.E. Snyder House is a historic two-story house in Columbus, Nebraska. It was built in 1928 by George Johnsen I, and designed by architect Edward J. Sessinghaus. It has been listed on the National Register of Historic Places since July 10, 1986.
