= North Bend Carnegie Library =

- U.S. National Register of Historic Places
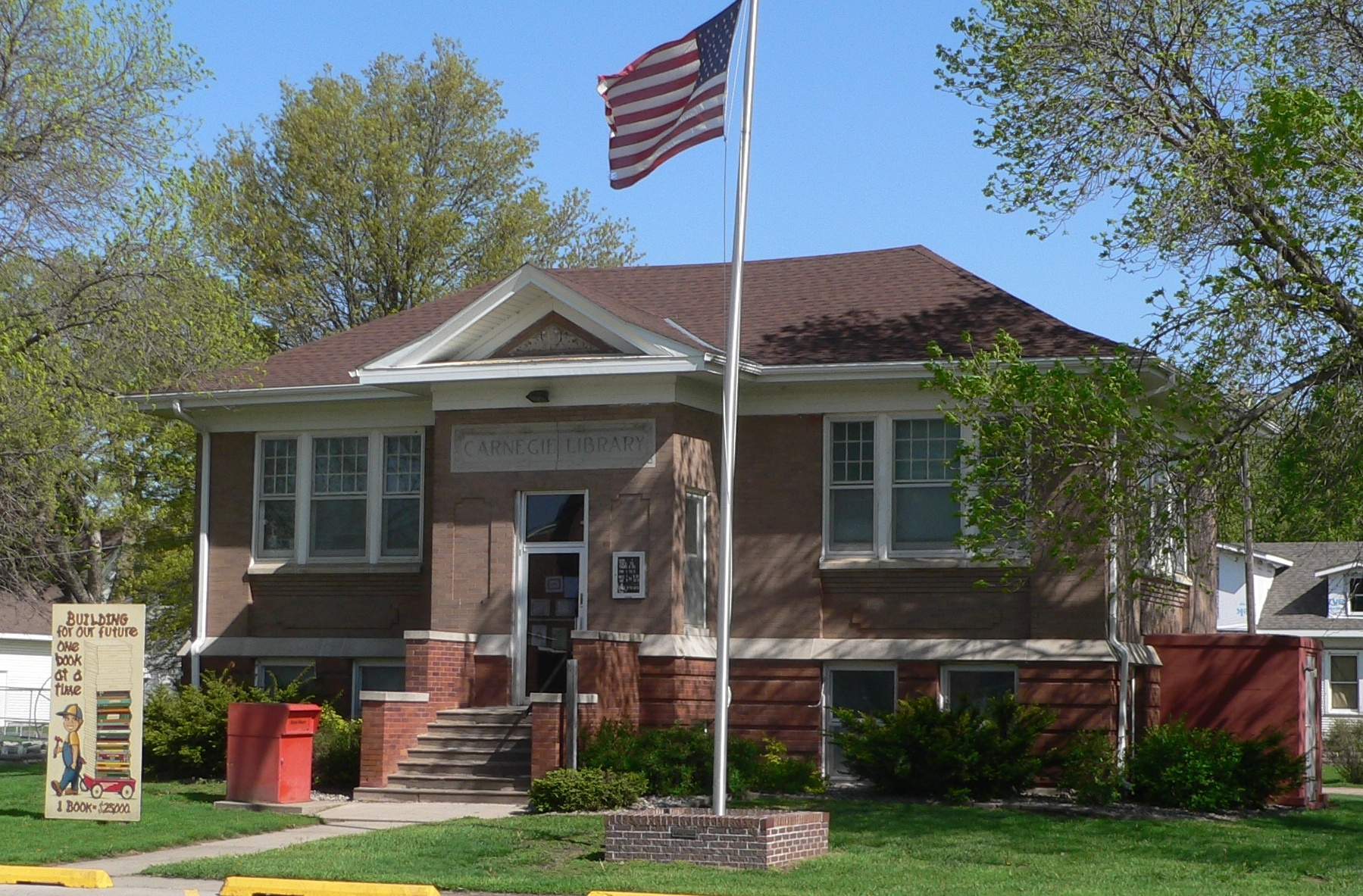

- Location within Nebraska Location within the United States
- Location: 140 E. 8th St., North Bend, Nebraska
- Coordinates: 41°27′50″N 96°46′44″W
- Area: less than one acre
- Built: 1913
- Architect: Smith, John R.
- NRHP reference No.: 81000371
- Added to NRHP: September 3, 1981

The North Bend Carnegie Library is a Carnegie library located at 140 E. 8th St. in North Bend, Nebraska. The library was funded by the Carnegie Foundation in 1911 and dedicated in 1913; it housed a library program started by the city's Woman's Club in 1906. The building was designed by John R. Smith according to the simple plans suggested by the Carnegie Foundation. The city used the library until 2012, when they vacated it for a new building.

The North Bend Carnegie Library was added to the National Register of Historic Places on September 3, 1981.
