= Snyder House (Kalispell, Montana) =

Historic house in Montana, United States

- U.S. National Register of Historic Places
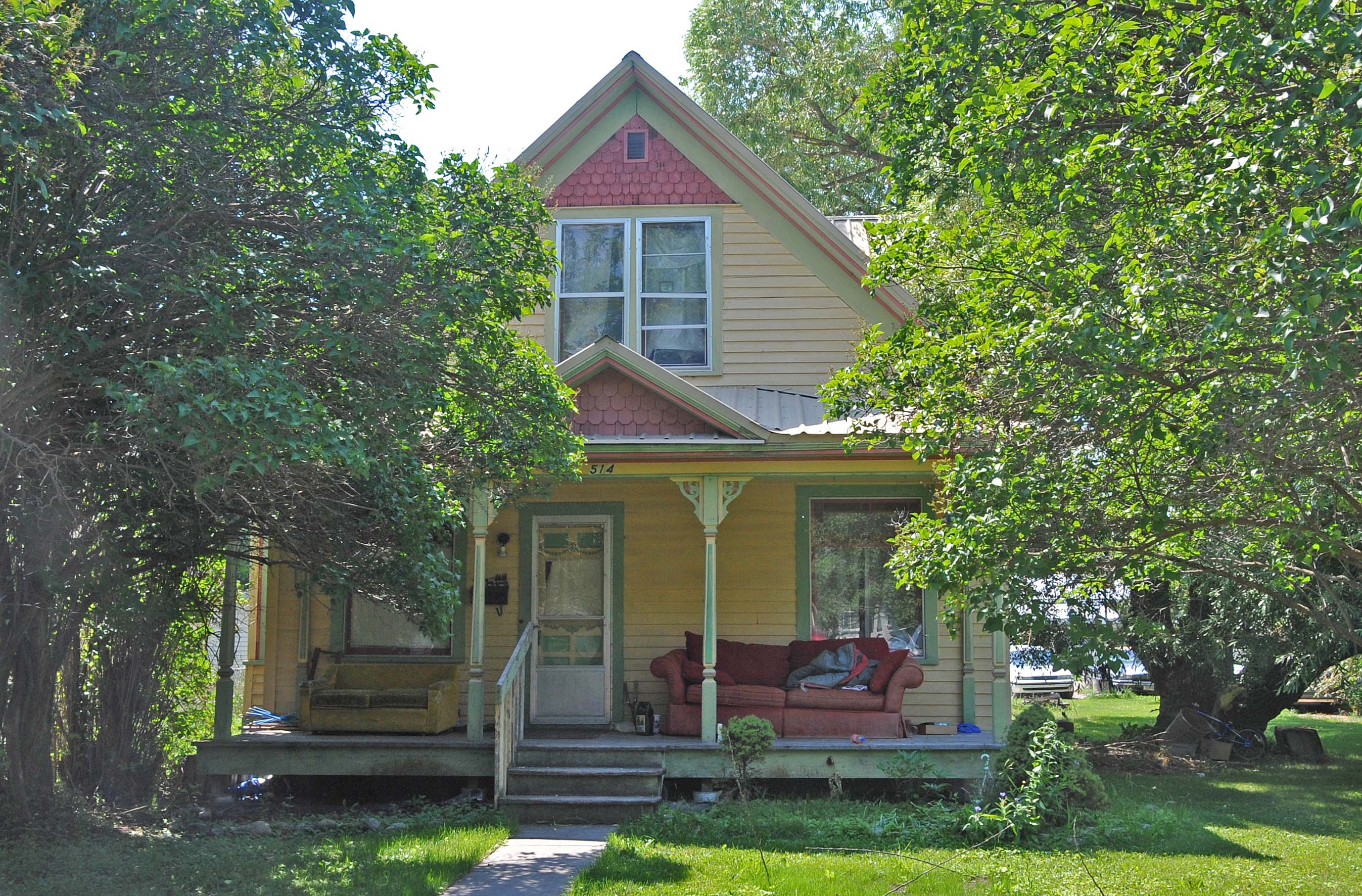

- Location within Montana Location within the United States
- Location: 514 8th Ave. W., Kalispell, Montana
- Coordinates: 48°11′30″N 114°19′23″W
- Built: c.1900
- Architectural style: Colonial Revival
- MPS: Kalispell MPS
- NRHP reference No.: 94000916
- Added to NRHP: August 24, 1994

The Snyder House in Kalispell, Montana, also known as Howard House and as Welty House, is a "transitional Colonial Revival" style house built in c.1900.

It is a wood-frame house that was probably built by stonemason Joseph C. Snyder, and its design is probably from a pattern book. It was argued to be "a fine representative example of transitional Colonial Revival styling on Kalispell's west side." Its NRHP nomination states:

While the overall massing and cross-gabled form of the house are distinctive of the Colonial Revival genre, numerous decorative elements clearly reflect late 19th century Queen Anne styling, including the turned supports with scroll-work on the almost-full-width front porch, the clapboard siding with decorative shingle work in the gable ends, the stained glass transoms, and the bay window.

It was listed on the National Register of Historic Places in 1994.
