= Monroe, Nebraska =

Village in Platte County, Nebraska, United States

- Village
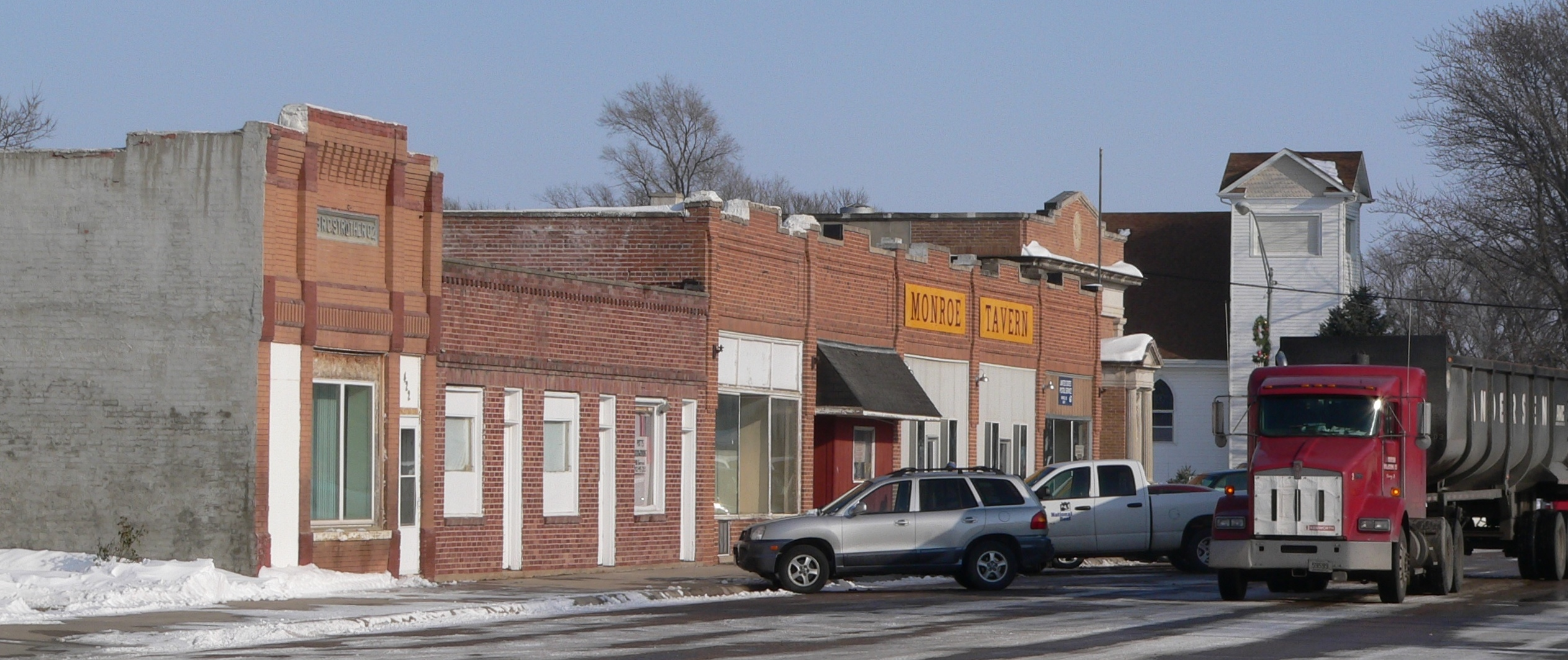
- Downtown Monroe, December 2009

- Location of Monroe, Nebraska
- Coordinates: 41°28′27″N 97°35′57″W
- Country: United States
- State: Nebraska
- County: Platte

Area
  - Total: 0.20 sq mi (0.51 km^{2})
  - Land: 0.20 sq mi (0.51 km^{2})
  - Water: 0 sq mi (0.00 km^{2})
- Elevation: 1,522 ft (464 m)

Population (2020)
  - Total: 296
  - Density: 1,514.4/sq mi (584.71/km^{2})
- Time zone: UTC-6 (Central (CST))
  - Summer (DST): UTC-5 (CDT)
- ZIP code: 68647
- Area code: 402
- FIPS code: 31-32585
- GNIS feature ID: 2399383
- Website: villageofmonroe.com

Monroe is a village in Platte County, Nebraska, United States. As of the 2020 census, Monroe had a population of 296.

== History ==
The first settlement at Monroe was made in the 1850s. Monroe was not platted until 1889 when the railroad extended a siding to that point. It was named for President James Monroe.

The Monroe Congregational Church and New Hope Cemetery, located in the nearby community of O'Kay, is listed on the National Register of Historic Places.

== Geography ==
According to the United States Census Bureau, the village has a total area of 0.17 square miles (0.44 km^{2}), all land.

== Demographics ==
Historical population
Census	Pop.	Note	%±
1900	214		—
1910	282		31.8%
1920	309		9.6%
1930	293		−5.2%
1940	315		7.5%
1950	269		−14.6%
1960	261		−3.0%
1970	295		13.0%
1980	294		−0.3%
1990	309		5.1%
2000	307		−0.6%
2010	284		−7.5%
2020	296		4.2%
U.S. Decennial Census

=== 2010 census ===
As of the census of 2010, there were 284 people, 121 households, and 79 families living in the village. The population density was 1,670.6 inhabitants per square mile (645.0/km^{2}). There were 128 housing units at an average density of 752.9 per square mile (290.7/km^{2}). The racial makeup of the village was 97.2% White, 0.4% African American, 0.4% Asian, and 2.1% from other races. Hispanic or Latino of any race were 3.9% of the population.

There were 121 households, of which 26.4% had children under the age of 18 living with them, 57.9% were married couples living together, 4.1% had a female householder with no husband present, 3.3% had a male householder with no wife present, and 34.7% were non-families. 26.4% of all households were made up of individuals, and 10.8% had someone living alone who was 65 years of age or older. The average household size was 2.35 and the average family size was 2.89.

The median age in the village was 45 years. 22.5% of residents were under the age of 18; 7.8% were between the ages of 18 and 24; 19.7% were from 25 to 44; 31.4% were from 45 to 64; and 18.7% were 65 years of age or older. The gender makeup of the village was 48.6% male and 51.4% female.

=== 2000 census ===
As of the census of 2000, there were 307 people, 119 households, and 89 families living in the village. The population density was 1,753.8 inhabitants per square mile (677.1/km^{2}). There were 125 housing units at an average density of 714.1 per square mile (275.7/km^{2}). The racial makeup of the village was 98.37% White, 0.33% Pacific Islander, 1.30% from other races. Hispanic or Latino of any race were 1.63% of the population.

There were 119 households, out of which 37.8% had children under the age of 18 living with them, 64.7% were married couples living together, 9.2% had a female householder with no husband present, and 25.2% were non-families. 21.8% of all households were made up of individuals, and 11.8% had someone living alone who was 65 years of age or older. The average household size was 2.58 and the average family size was 3.01.

In the village, the population was spread out, with 27.4% under the age of 18, 7.2% from 18 to 24, 30.6% from 25 to 44, 20.8% from 45 to 64, and 14.0% who were 65 years of age or older. The median age was 36 years. For every 100 females, there were 91.9 males. For every 100 females age 18 and over, there were 92.2 males.

As of 2000 the median income for a household in the village was $37,292, and the median income for a family was $43,977. Males had a median income of $27,917 versus $21,607 for females. The per capita income for the village was $16,311. About 4.7% of families and 6.1% of the population were below the poverty line, including 7.4% of those under the age of eighteen and 17.8% of those 65 or over.

== Education ==
In 2001, Monroe, Silver Creek, and Genoa merged into a single Twin River School District. After the consolidation, only a K-6 school remained in Monroe. This was closed in the fall of 2007. The school district retains possession of the Monroe gym, which it uses for junior high athletic events.

== See also ==
- List of municipalities in Nebraska
