= Frederick L. and L. Frederick Gottschalk Houses =

- U.S. National Register of Historic Places
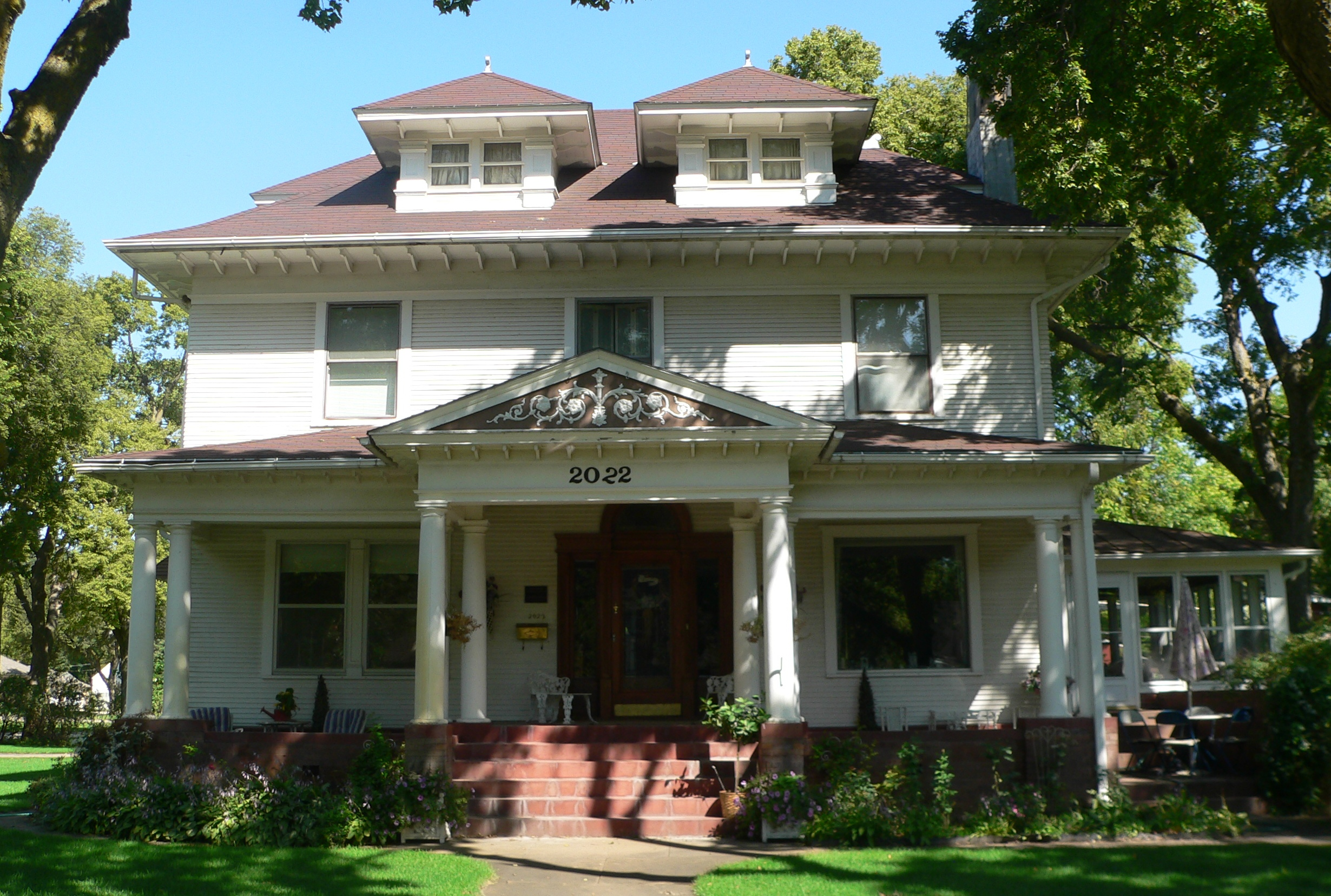
- The L. Frederick Gottschalk House in 2010

- Location within Nebraska Location within the United States
- Location: 2022 17th Street, Columbus, Nebraska
- Coordinates: 41°25′59″N 97°21′08″W
- Area: less than one acre
- Built: 1857, 1911
- Architect: Charles Wurdeman
- NRHP reference No.: 82003200
- Added to NRHP: June 25, 1982

The Frederick L. and L. Frederick Gottschalk Houses are two historic houses in Columbus, Nebraska. The log house was built by Frederick Gottschalk and his wife, née Margaretha Loy Deuck, in 1857 on property they homesteaded. Gottschalk was an immigrant from Germany, and a co-founder of Columbus. The cabin is considered the oldest such structure in Nebraska.

Their son, L. Frederick Gottchalk, built a two-story house next to it in 1911; it was designed in the Colonial Revival style by architect Charles Wurdeman.

The properties have been listed on the National Register of Historic Places since June 25, 1982. The log cabin has since been moved and is currently on display at the Platte County Historical Society museum, to which it was donated by a later owner of the property.
