= Monroe Congregational Church and New Hope Cemetery =

Historic site in Platte County, Nebraska, US

- U.S. National Register of Historic Places
- U.S. Historic district
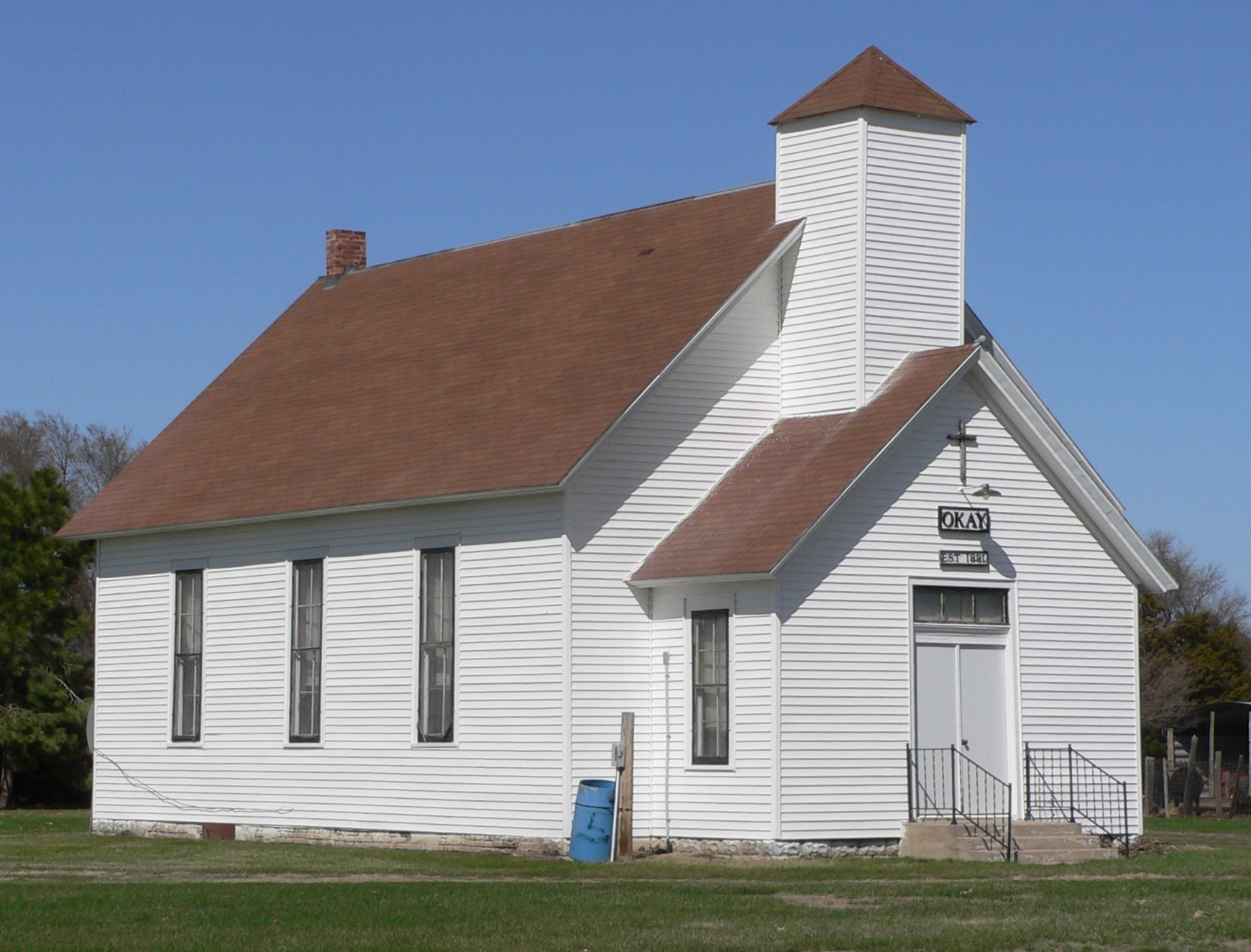

- Location within Nebraska Location within the United States
- Nearest city: Monroe, Nebraska
- Coordinates: 41°32′28″N 97°39′06″W
- Area: 3 acres (1.2 ha)
- Built: 1881
- Built by: Murdock & Son; Watts, Joseph
- NRHP reference No.: 90001768
- Added to NRHP: November 28, 1990

The Monroe Congregational Church and New Hope Cemetery is a church and cemetery near Monroe, Nebraska. It was added to the National Register in 1990. The listing included three contributing buildings and a contributing site.

The Monroe Congregational Church, built in 1881, is one-story frame building with a gable roof. The property includes a privy (c. 1881), a storage shed (c. 1881), and a Victorian wrought-iron fence. The New Hope Cemetery is about 100 feet (30 m) to the west.

It is located in the community of O'Kay, which had population 250 around 1990.
