= Stanton Carnegie Library =

- U.S. National Register of Historic Places
- Location within Nebraska Location within the United States
- Location: 1009 Jackpine St., Stanton, Nebraska
- Coordinates: 41°57′05″N 97°13′29″W
- Area: less than one acre
- Built: 1915
- NRHP reference No.: 100003095
- Added to NRHP: November 5, 2018

The Stanton Carnegie Library, in Stanton, Nebraska, was built in 1915. It was listed on the National Register of Historic Places in 2018.
