= Fairbury Public Library =

- U.S. National Register of Historic Places
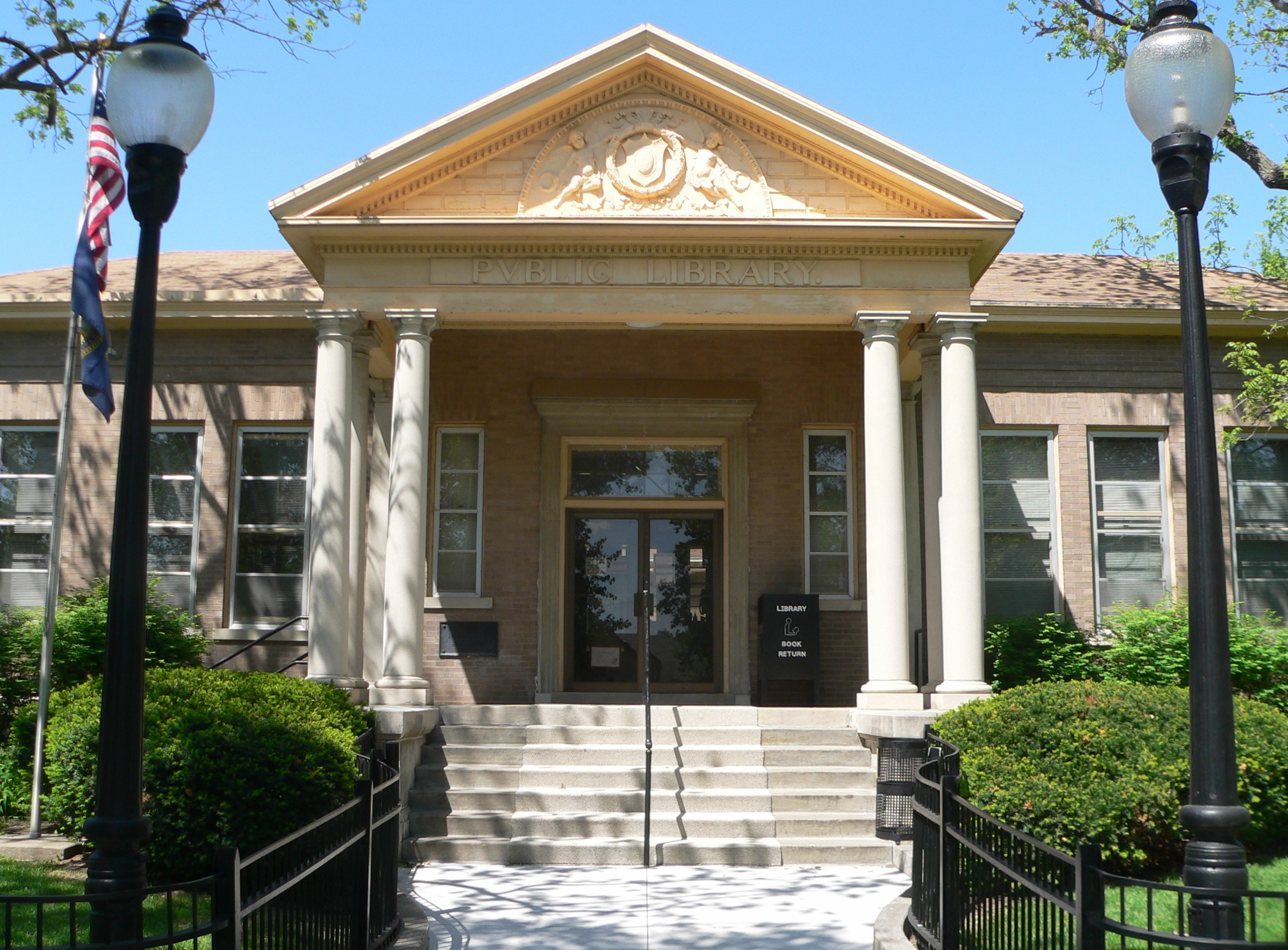
- The library in 2013

- Location within Nebraska Location within the United States
- Location: 601 7th Street, Fairbury, Nebraska
- Coordinates: 40°08′19″N 97°10′40″W
- Area: less than one acre
- Built: 1908
- Architect: Tyler and Son
- Architectural style: Classical Revival
- NRHP reference No.: 85002141
- Added to NRHP: September 12, 1985

The Fairbury Public Library is a library in Fairbury, Nebraska. Its building was constructed in 1908-09 as a Carnegie library with funding from the Carnegie Corporation. It was designed in the Classical Revival style by Tyler and Son, an architectural firm co-founded by English-born James Tyler and his son, James Tyler Jr. The facade includes two sets of columns and a tympanum with "cherubs holding a ring which encircles a shield." The first 100 books were donated by the Fairbury Woman's Club. The building was listed on the National Register of Historic Places on September 12, 1985, as Fairbury Public-Carnegie Library.

In 2019, it continues to serve as the Fairbury Public Library.
