= C. Segelke Building =

- Segelke, C., Building
- U.S. National Register of Historic Places
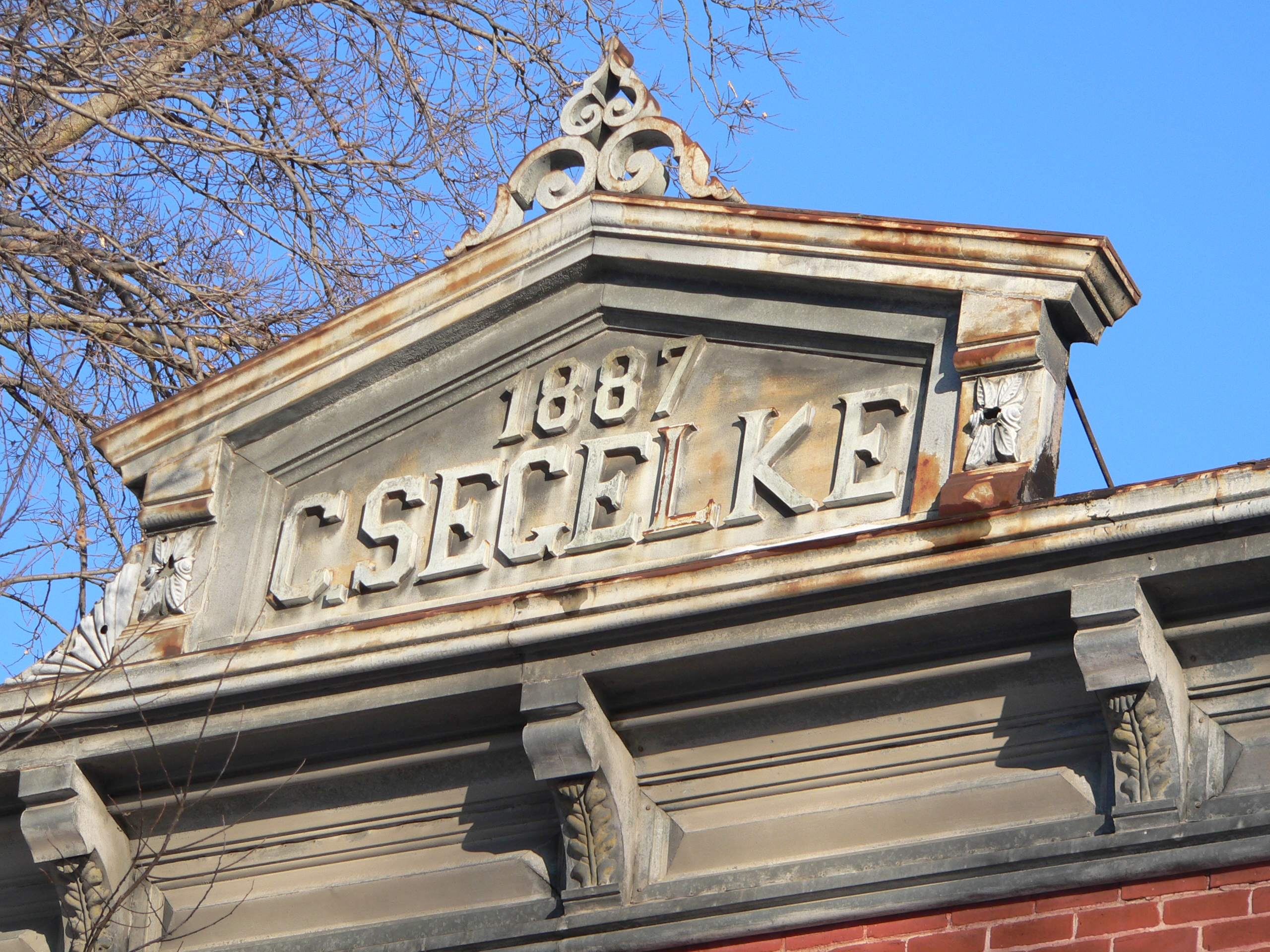

- Location within Nebraska Location within the United States
- Location: 1065 17th Ave., Columbus, Nebraska
- Coordinates: 41°25′36″N 97°20′52″W
- Area: less than one acre
- Built: 1887; 139 years ago
- Architectural style: Italianate
- NRHP reference No.: 82004891
- Added to NRHP: June 25, 1982

The C. Segelke Building, at 1065 17th Ave. in Columbus, Nebraska, was built in 1887. It was listed on the National Register of Historic Places in 1982.

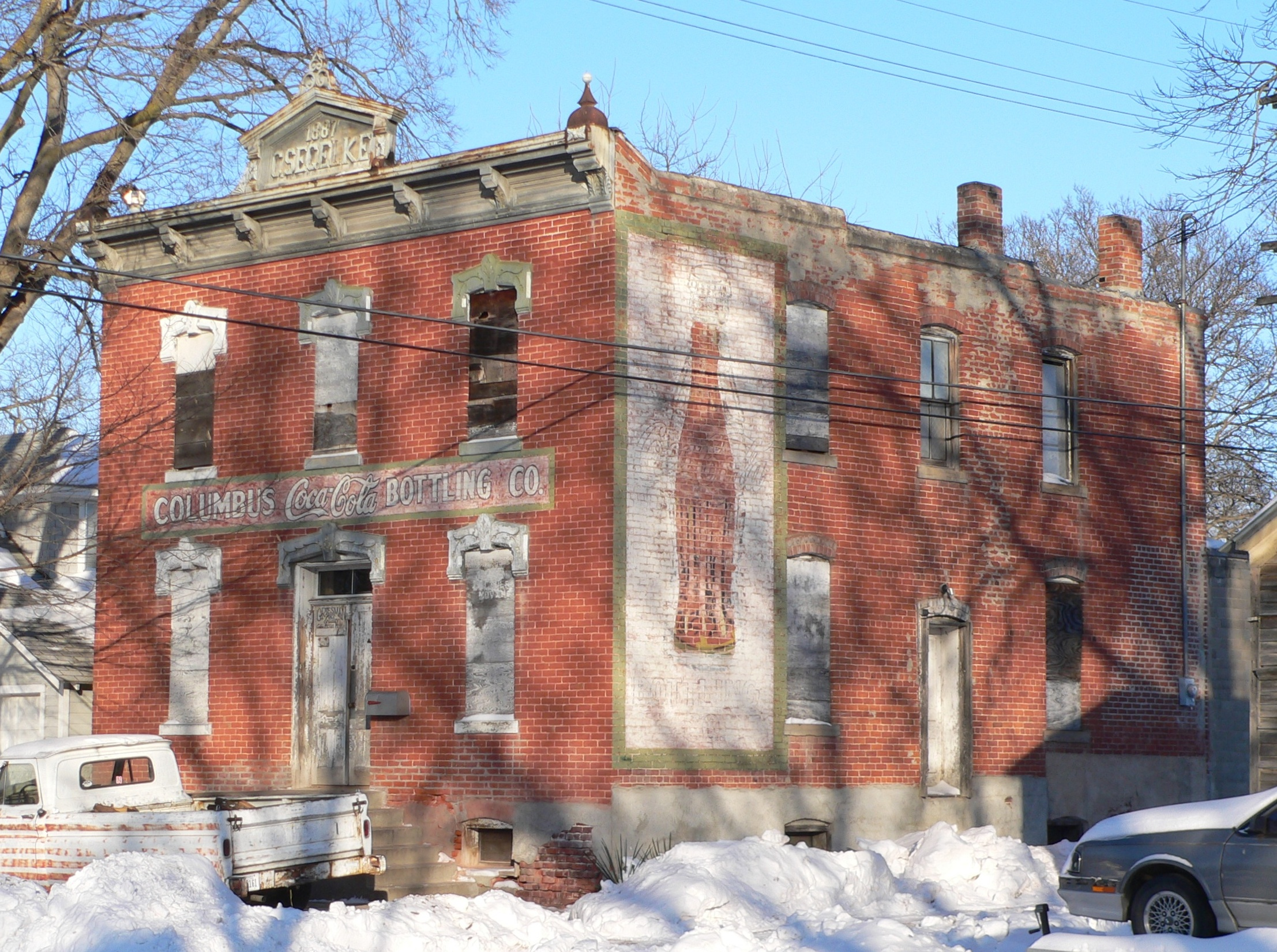

It served as the Columbus Bottling Works and, in later years, as the Columbus Coca-Cola Bottling Company. Its architecture is simplified commercial Italianate in style.

The listing included a second contributing building, a long, low storage shed across the alley behind the main building.
