= Loup City Township Carnegie Library =

- U.S. National Register of Historic Places
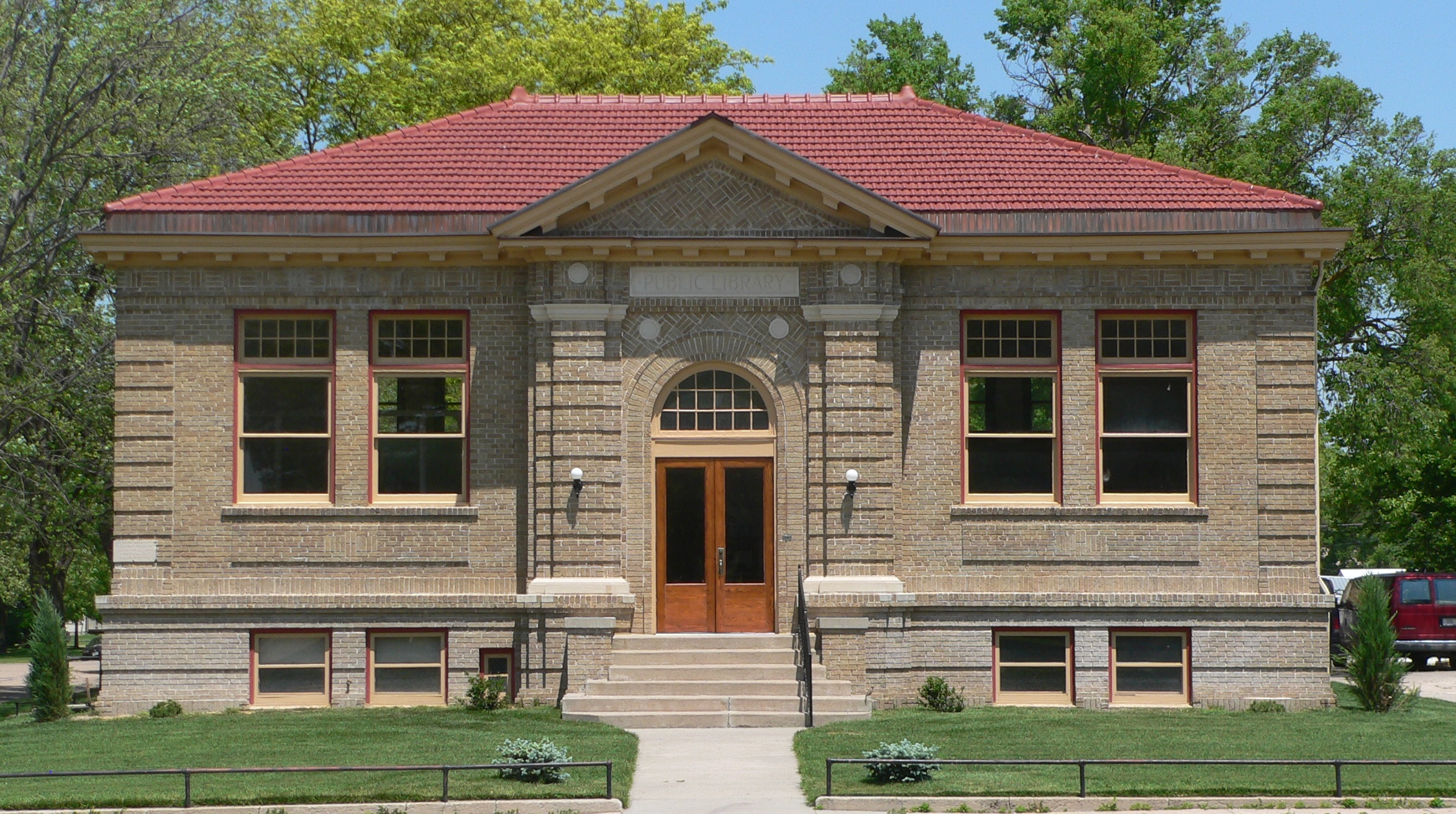
- The library in 2010

- Location within Nebraska Location within the United States
- Location: 652 N Street, Loup City, Nebraska
- Coordinates: 41°16′34″N 98°58′00″W
- Area: less than one acre
- Built: 1917
- Built by: John Ohlson & Sons
- Architect: Fiske & Meginnis
- Architectural style: Classical Revival
- MPS: Carnegie Libraries in Nebraska MPS
- NRHP reference No.: 07001326
- Added to NRHP: December 27, 2007

The Loup City Township Carnegie Library is a historic building in Loup City, Nebraska. It was built as a Carnegie library in 1917 by John Ohlson & Sons after members of the community applied for a grant from the Carnegie Corporation. The cornerstone was laid by the Grand Lodge of Nebraska in January 1917, and the library was dedicated on September 3, 1917. The building was designed in the Classical Revival style by Fiske & Meginnis. It has been listed on the National Register of Historic Places since December 27, 2007.
