= Humphrey City Hall =

- U.S. National Register of Historic Places
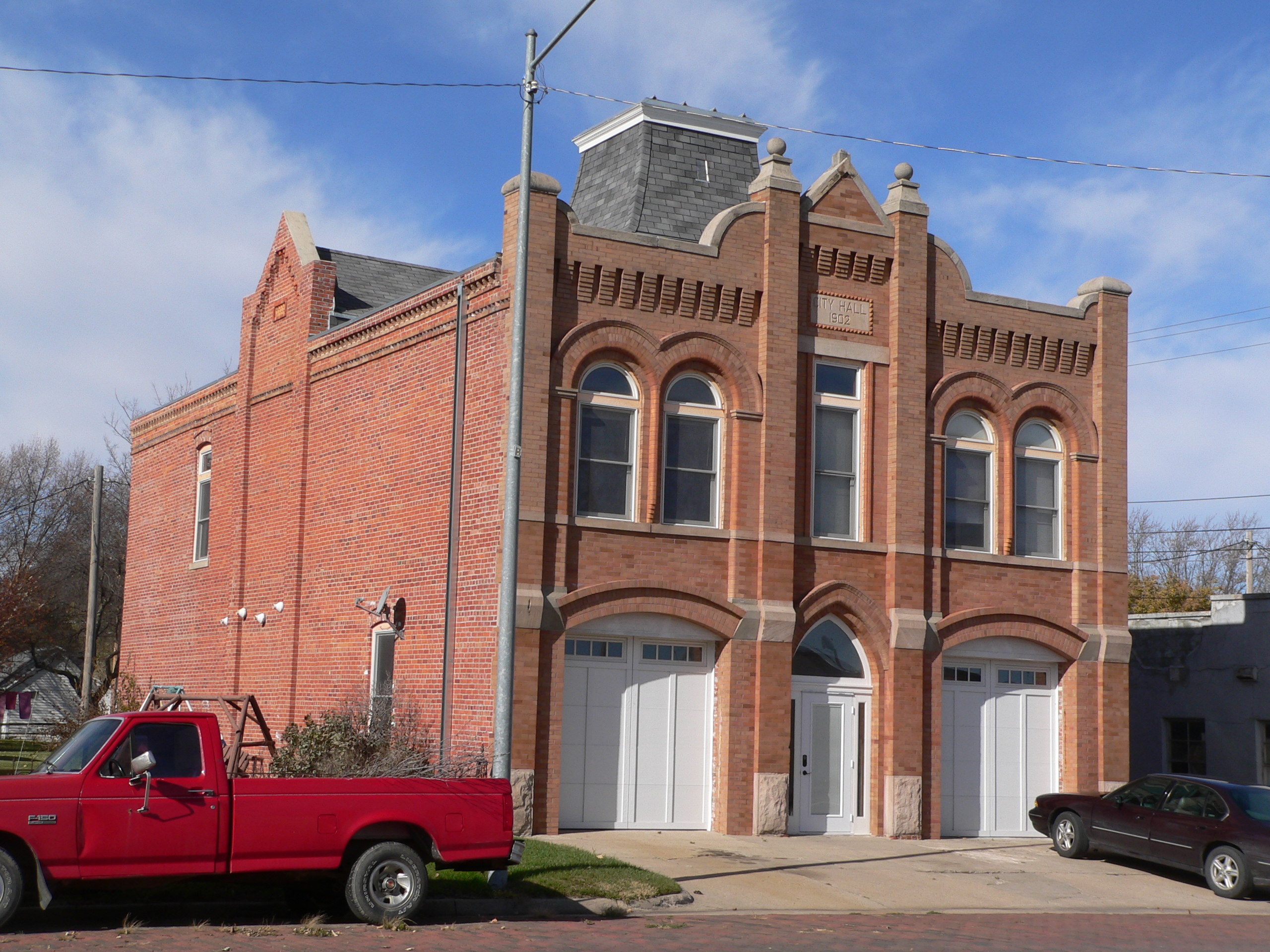

- Location within Nebraska Location within the United States
- Location: 407 S. 4th St., Humphrey, Nebraska
- Coordinates: 41°41′27″N 97°29′09″W
- Area: less than one acre
- Built: 1902
- Architectural style: Renaissance revival
- NRHP reference No.: 96000682
- Added to NRHP: June 21, 1996

The Humphrey City Hall, at 407 S. 4th St. in Humphrey, Nebraska, was built in 1902. It was listed on the National Register of Historic Places in 1996.

It is a 36 by 64 feet (11 m × 20 m) in plan. It has two fire engine doors.
