= Butler Township, Platte County, Nebraska =

Butler Township
- Township
- Location in Platte County
- Coordinates: 41°23′20″N 097°30′03″W
- Country: United States
- State: Nebraska
- County: Platte

Area
  - Total: 33.63 sq mi (87.11 km^{2})
  - Land: 30.22 sq mi (78.28 km^{2})
  - Water: 3.41 sq mi (8.82 km^{2}) 10.13%
- Elevation: 1,503 ft (458 m)

Population (2020)
  - Total: 614
  - Density: 20.3/sq mi (7.84/km^{2})
- GNIS feature ID: 0837900

Butler Township is one of eighteen townships in Platte County, Nebraska, United States. The population was 614 at the 2020 census. A 2021 estimate placed the township's population at 609.

The Village of Duncan lies within the Township.

Butler Township was established in about 1867.

== See also ==
- County government in Nebraska
