= Madison Public Library (Madison, Nebraska) =

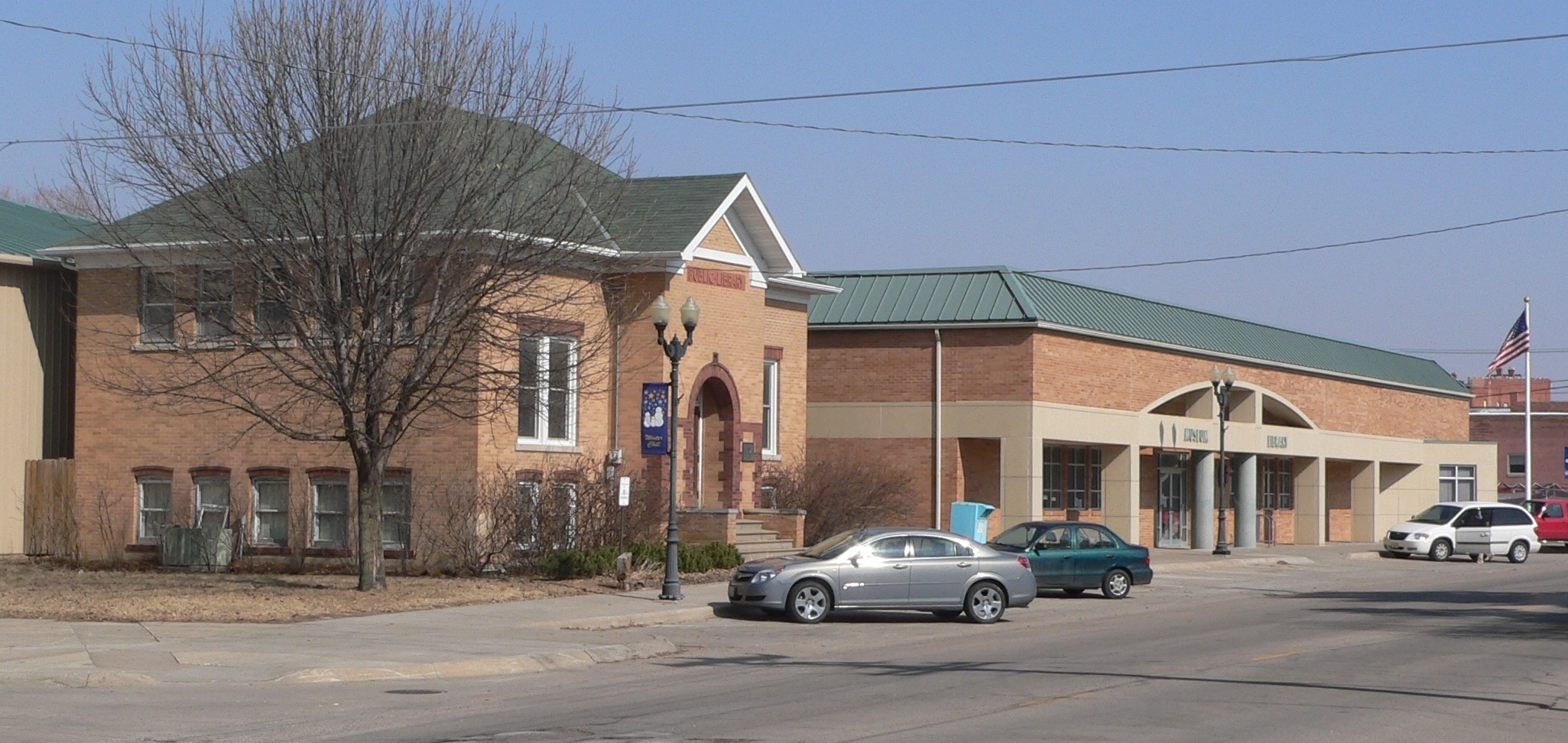
- Madison Public Library. At left is the 1912 Carnegie library; at right is the more recent city hall building, where the library is now housed.
- 41°49′41.4″N 97°27′24.8″W
- Location: Madison, Nebraska, United States
- Type: Public library
- Established: 1912

Collection
- Size: 23,000

Access and use
- Circulation: 13,000

Other information
- Director: Naomi Hemphill

The Madison Public Library is a public library which serves the residents of Madison, Nebraska. The library offers 23,000 items to library users, including movies, audiobooks, books and magazines. Around 13,000 items are borrowed by area residents each year. Seven public Internet computers are available.

The library hosts an annual summer reading program, with entertainers, crafts, and programming, usually held weekly throughout the summer.

== History ==
The library was originally founded in 1907 by the local Woman's Club of Madison. While the collection was initially held in a location donated by a town doctor, in 1908 it moved to the second floor of city hall. By 1910 the library had a collection of over 1,000 volumes.
