= Duncan, Nebraska =

Village in Platte County, Nebraska, United States

- Village
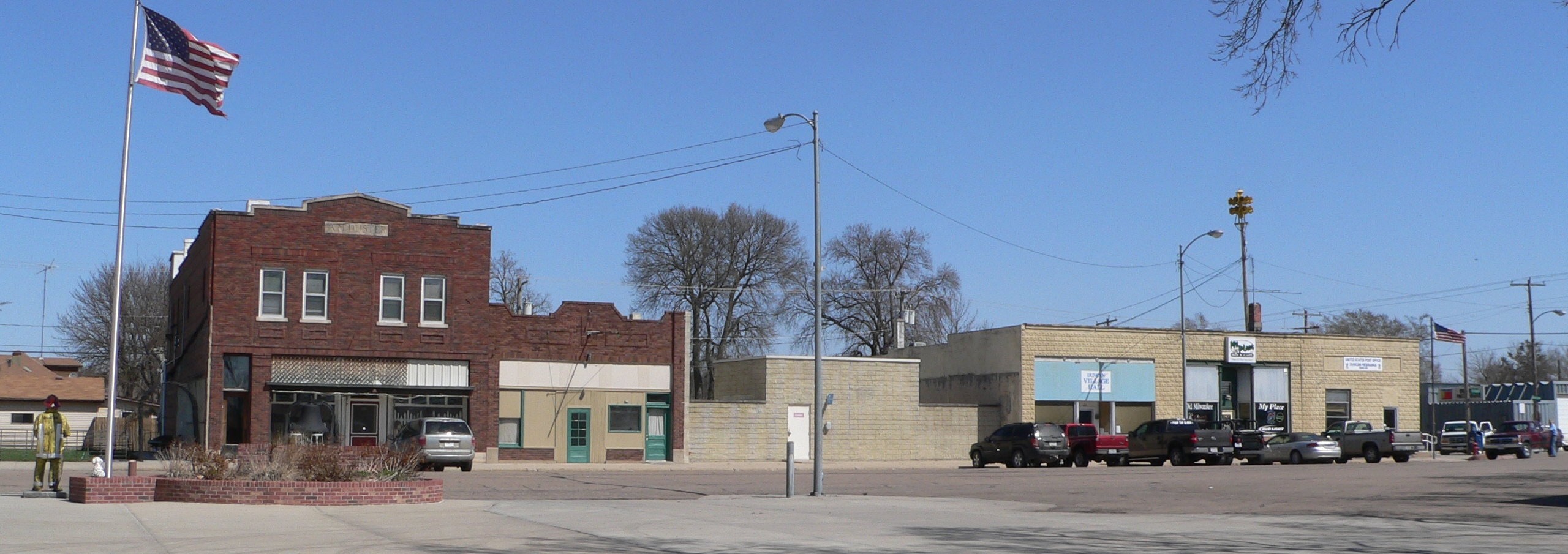
- Downtown Duncan: 8th Street west of Main Street, April 2010

- Location of Duncan, Nebraska

- Location within Nebraska Location within the United States
- Coordinates: 41°23′25″N 97°29′34″W
- Country: United States
- State: Nebraska
- County: Platte
- Township: Butler

Area
  - Total: 0.47 sq mi (1.21 km^{2})
  - Land: 0.47 sq mi (1.21 km^{2})
  - Water: 0 sq mi (0.00 km^{2})
- Elevation: 1,496 ft (456 m)

Population (2020)
  - Total: 392
  - Density: 838.0/sq mi (323.56/km^{2})
- Time zone: UTC-6 (Central (CST))
  - Summer (DST): UTC-5 (CDT)
- ZIP code: 68634
- Area code: 402
- FIPS code: 31-13890
- GNIS feature ID: 2398753
- Website: www.villageofduncan.com

Duncan is a village in Platte County, Nebraska, United States. As of the 2020 census, Duncan had a population of 392.

== History ==
The transcontinental railroad reached the site of Duncan in 1866. Among the first settlers in the area were Polish and Swiss immigrants. In June 1869, the post office of Cherry Hill was established on the site.

In October 1871, the townsite of Jackson was laid out by officials of the Union Pacific Railroad. Jackson was chosen in 1879 as the southern terminus of the Omaha, Niobrara, and Black Hills Railroad, a Union Pacific subsidiary, purportedly because railroad magnate Jay Gould was angry at the town of Columbus for promoting a rival railroad in the region.

In 1880, the settlement's name was changed to Duncan, owing to the existence of another Jackson in Dakota County. The new name honored General Wood B. Duncan, a prominent onetime local resident. In the following year, an ice jam destroyed the Omaha, Niobrara, and Black Hills Railroad bridge across the Loup River; the line was later moved to branch off the main line of the Union Pacific at Columbus.

A Baptist church was organized in Duncan in 1881. In the following year, St. Stanislaus Church was built by the Polish Roman Catholics of the Duncan area. In 1883, St. Paul's Methodist Episcopal Church was established.

The Village of Duncan was incorporated in 1913.

== Geography ==
Duncan lies between the Loup River and the Platte River, on U.S. Route 30, 8 miles (13 km) west of Columbus.

According to the United States Census Bureau, the village has a total area of 0.42 square miles (1.09 km^{2}), all land.

== Demographics ==
Historical population
Census	Pop.	Note	%±
1920	182		—
1930	241		32.4%
1940	241		0.0%
1950	228		−5.4%
1960	294		28.9%
1970	298		1.4%
1980	410		37.6%
1990	387		−5.6%
2000	359		−7.2%
2010	351		−2.2%
2020	392		11.7%
U.S. Decennial Census

=== 2010 census ===
As of the census of 2010, there were 351 people, 137 households, and 99 families residing in the village. The population density was 835.7 inhabitants per square mile (322.7/km^{2}). There were 142 housing units at an average density of 338.1 per square mile (130.5/km^{2}). The racial makeup of the village was 98.0% White, 0.3% Native American, 0.3% Asian, and 1.4% from two or more races. Hispanic or Latino of any race were 0.3% of the population.

There were 137 households, of which 31.4% had children under the age of 18 living with them, 61.3% were married couples living together, 4.4% had a female householder with no husband present, 6.6% had a male householder with no wife present, and 27.7% were non-families. 21.9% of all households were made up of individuals, and 8.8% had someone living alone who was 65 years of age or older. The average household size was 2.56 and the average family size was 2.96.

The median age in the village was 39.4 years. 24.8% of residents were under the age of 18; 8% were between the ages of 18 and 24; 22.9% were from 25 to 44; 30.4% were from 45 to 64; and 14% were 65 years of age or older. The gender makeup of the village was 54.1% male and 45.9% female.

=== 2000 census ===
As of the census of 2000, there were 359 people, 138 households, and 93 families residing in the village. The population density was 890.2 inhabitants per square mile (343.7/km^{2}). There were 145 housing units at an average density of 359.6 per square mile (138.8/km^{2}). The racial makeup of the village was 95.82% White, 0.56% Native American, 0.28% Asian, 1.67% from other races, and 1.67% from two or more races. Hispanic or Latino of any race were 2.23% of the population.

There were 138 households, out of which 32.6% had children under the age of 18 living with them, 60.1% were married couples living together, 4.3% had a female householder with no husband present, and 32.6% were non-families. 26.8% of all households were made up of individuals, and 14.5% had someone living alone who was 65 years of age or older. The average household size was 2.60 and the average family size was 3.24.

In the village, the population was spread out, with 30.9% under the age of 18, 6.4% from 18 to 24, 28.1% from 25 to 44, 23.1% from 45 to 64, and 11.4% who were 65 years of age or older. The median age was 34 years. For every 100 females, there were 127.2 males. For every 100 females age 18 and over, there were 112.0 males.

As of 2000 the median income for a household in the village was $36,932, and the median income for a family was $42,031. Males had a median income of $26,023 versus $21,023 for females. The per capita income for the village was $15,475. About 4.2% of families and 5.7% of the population were below the poverty line, including 7.5% of those under the age of eighteen and 9.5% of those 65 or over.

== Economy ==
The economy is based on farming, cattle feeding, hogs, manufacturing and retailing. Duncan is where all Dorothy Lynch salad dressings are manufactured. In 1964, Tasty-Toppings, Inc. purchased the recipe and rights to Dorothy Lynch and built a production facility in Columbus, Nebraska. In 1979, the company later expanded its production capacity with a modern 64,000-square-foot (5,900 m^{2}) plant in Duncan, and is the town's largest employer.

== Culture ==
=== Landmarks ===
The former route of the Lincoln Highway on the north side of the railroad tracks can still be seen today. A concrete marker at the southeast corner of 8th Street and Main Avenue indicates the northeastern end of a 2.4-mile (3.9 km) section that has not changed significantly since the 1920s. This section of road, including the marker and an avenue of hackberry trees through which the old highway passed just south of downtown Duncan, is listed in the National Register of Historic Places as Lincoln Highway-Duncan West.

=== Religion ===
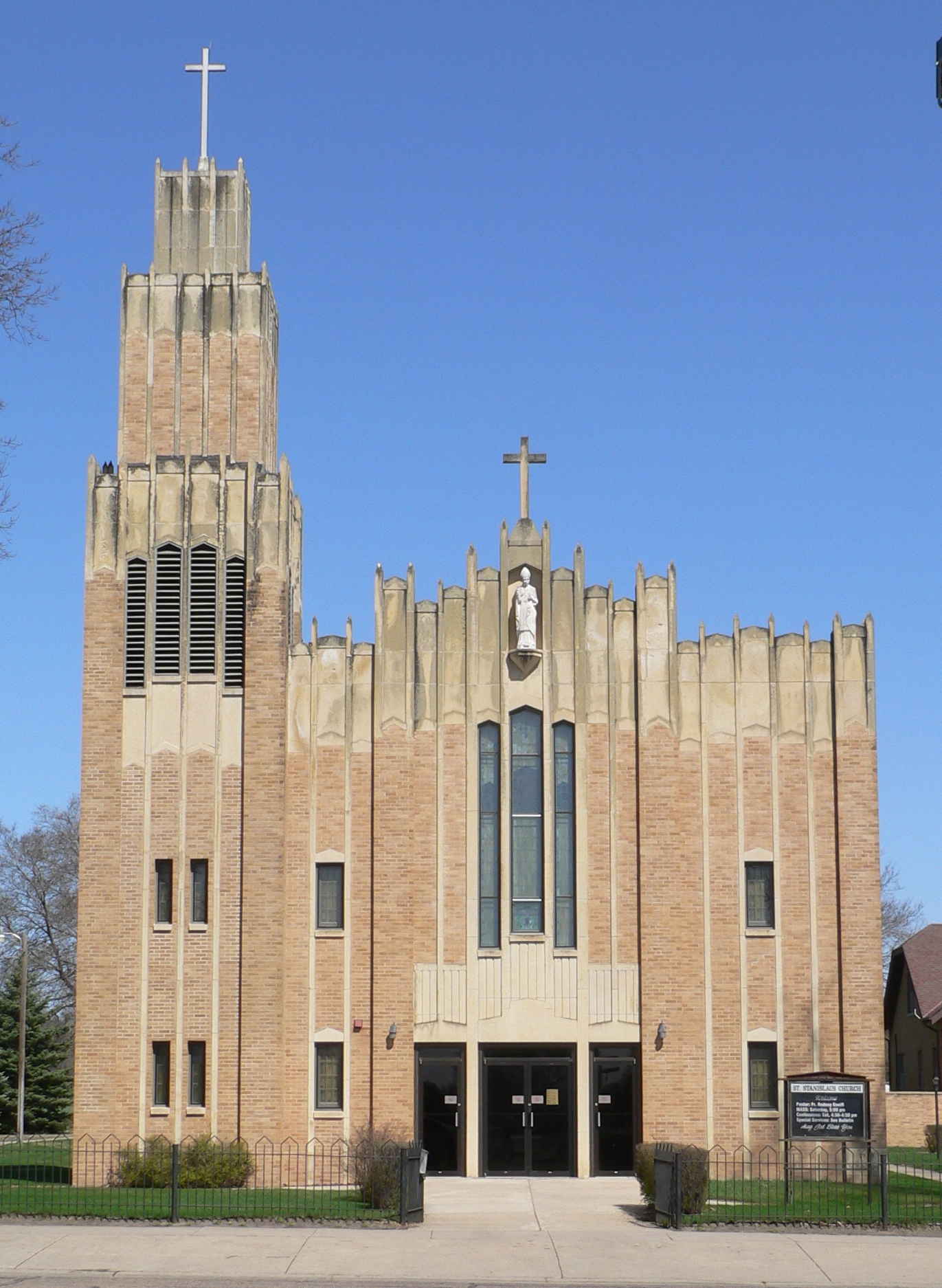
St. Stanislaus Church

The only remaining organized church in Duncan is St. Stanislaus Catholic Church. The current church was built in 1939; the patron saint's name is inscribed on the cornerstone in Polish.

In the past 25 years, many changes have taken place in the parish. 1971 saw the formation of the first Parish Council which assists the pastor and congregation in decision making and leadership. A parish center was constructed and dedicated in 1979. Also in 1980, a senior citizen group named the Golden Age Club was formed.

Plans for the church's future include ongoing remodeling for the old parish hall, recently renamed Pulaski Hall. In the fall of 1992 a church youth group was formed for the parish's high school students. Membership currently is about 25 youth who once a year transform Pulaski Hall into a "Haunted Hall" at Halloween as one of their fundraisers. The group promotes fellowship and responsibility.

=== Fairs and festivals ===
The Duncan Ribfest is a two-day summer street festival that usually takes place the last weekend of June. The 2008 event attracted an estimated 5,000 people over a two-day period. Ribfest is the largest summer event in downtown Duncan. Festival entertainment including live polka, classic rock, and country music. The members of the Duncan Fire Department have been volunteering their time each year and have raised funds to help purchase new equipment through this event. Along with the fire department, it is also sponsored by Duncan Wrestling members.

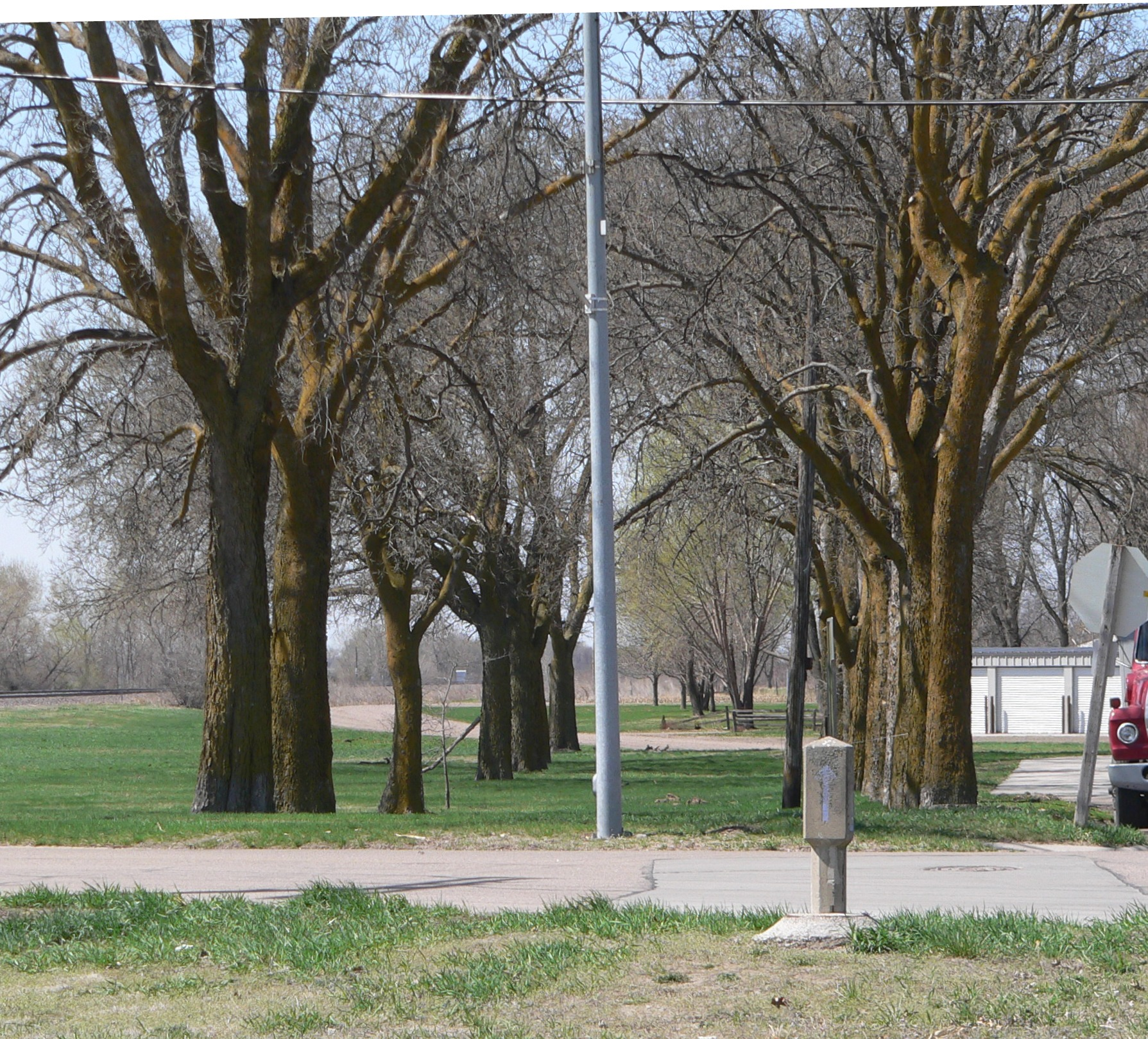
Route of the Lincoln Highway through Duncan. The concrete marker in the right foreground points toward the avenue of hackberry trees through which the highway passed.

== Transportation ==
Duncan lies on the natural overland route across Nebraska running up the Platte and the Loup valleys, and transportation has always been a major factor in its history.

The village is located on the main line of the Union Pacific Railroad, running into and out of Columbus with 60 freight trains daily. The railroad carries 60,000 inbound cars (excluding through cars) and 40,000 outbound cars annually.

In 1913, the cross-country Lincoln Highway was established. The highway, which paralleled the Union Pacific tracks through Duncan, was enthusiastically supported by the citizenry. It ran through central Duncan until 1928, when it was shifted to the south side of the tracks in order to eliminate grade-level crossings between Columbus and Grand Island. The south-side route is now used by U.S. Highway 30.

== Notable person ==
- Cory Schlesinger (June 23, 1972-), NFL fullback, former Nebraska Cornhusker football player

== See also ==
- List of municipalities in Nebraska
