= Tarnov, Nebraska =

Village in Platte County, Nebraska, United States

- Village
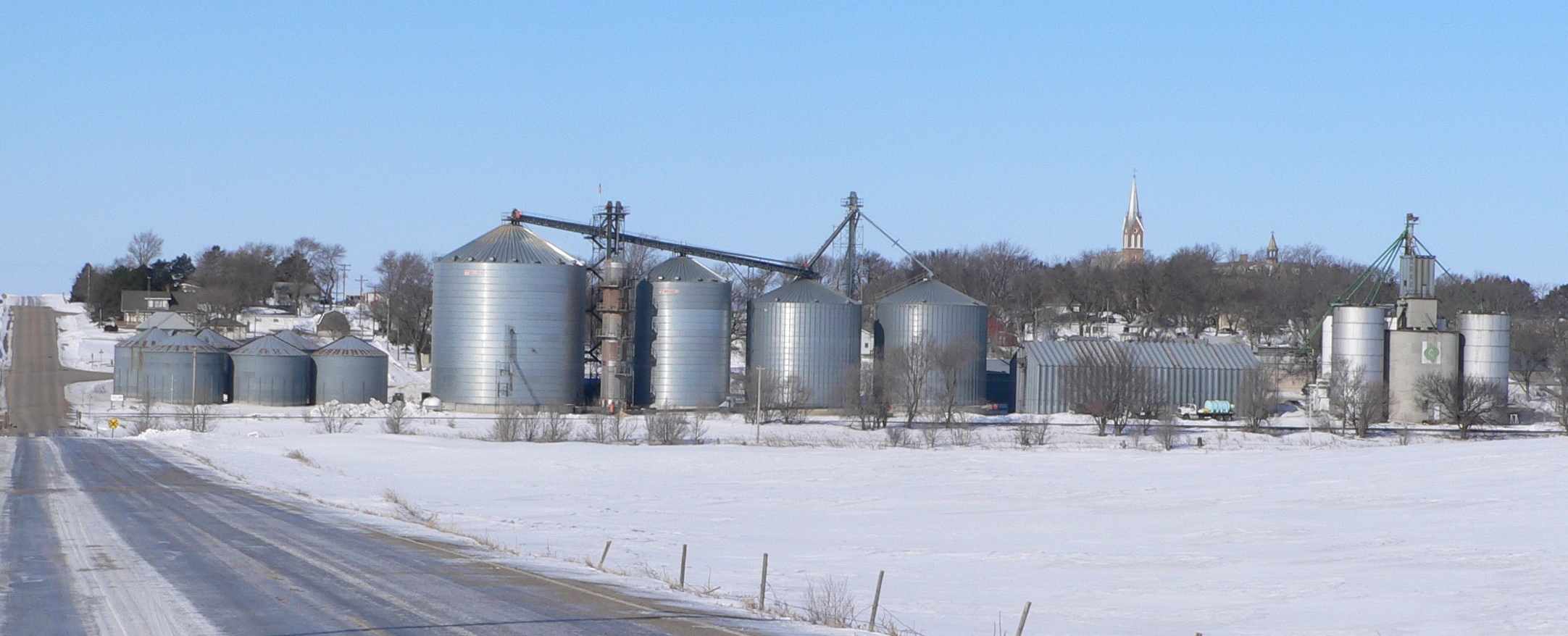
- Tarnov seen from the east. In the foreground are grain bins along the Nebraska Central Railroad track; on the hill right of center is the steeple of St. Michael's Catholic Church, February 2010

- Location of Tarnov, Nebraska
- Coordinates: 41°36′53″N 97°30′09″W
- Country: United States
- State: Nebraska
- County: Platte

Area
  - Total: 0.031 sq mi (0.08 km^{2})
  - Land: 0.031 sq mi (0.08 km^{2})
  - Water: 0 sq mi (0.00 km^{2})
- Elevation: 1,657 ft (505 m)

Population (2020)
  - Total: 52
  - Density: 1,637/sq mi (632.1/km^{2})
- Time zone: UTC-6 (Central (CST))
  - Summer (DST): UTC-5 (CDT)
- ZIP code: 68642
- Area code: 402
- FIPS code: 31-48410
- GNIS feature ID: 2399955

Tarnov is a village in Platte County, Nebraska, United States. As of the 2020 census, Tarnov had a population of 52.

== History ==
Tarnov was laid out in 1889. A large share of the early settlers being natives of Tarnów, Poland, caused the name to be selected.

A post office was established at Tarnov in 1891, and remained in operation until it was discontinued in 1969.

On August 19, 1943, the U.S. Army dropped seven practice bombs on Tarnov, mistaking it for either the Stanton Bombing Range, which was located 25 miles to the northeast, or a bombing range to the southwest, near Silver Creek. The B-17s, from the Sioux City, Iowa, Army Air Field, did little damage and no one was injured or killed.

== Geography ==
According to the United States Census Bureau, the village has a total area of 0.03 square miles (0.08 km^{2}), all land.

== Demographics ==
Historical population
Census	Pop.	Note	%±
1910	121		—
1930	139		—
1940	98		−29.5%
1950	74		−24.5%
1960	70		−5.4%
1970	63		−10.0%
1980	63		0.0%
1990	61		−3.2%
2000	63		3.3%
2010	46		−27.0%
2020	52		13.0%
U.S. Decennial Census

=== 2010 census ===
As of the census of 2010, there were 46 people, 21 households, and 12 families residing in the village. The population density was 1,533.3 inhabitants per square mile (592.0/km^{2}). There were 26 housing units at an average density of 866.7 per square mile (334.6/km^{2}). The racial makeup of the village was 100.0% White.

There were 21 households, of which 38.1% had children under the age of 18 living with them, 42.9% were married couples living together, 9.5% had a female householder with no husband present, 4.8% had a male householder with no wife present, and 42.9% were non-families. 38.1% of all households were made up of individuals, and 4.8% had someone living alone who was 65 years of age or older. The average household size was 2.19 and the average family size was 3.00.

The median age in the village was 42.3 years. 23.9% of residents were under the age of 18; 6.5% were between the ages of 18 and 24; 28.3% were from 25 to 44; 30.4% were from 45 to 64; and 10.9% were 65 years of age or older. The gender makeup of the village was 54.3% male and 45.7% female.

=== 2000 census ===
As of the census of 2000, there were 63 people, 24 households, and 15 families residing in the village. The population density was 2,117.5 inhabitants per square mile (817.6/km^{2}). There were 31 housing units at an average density of 1,041.9 per square mile (402.3/km^{2}). The racial makeup of the village was 100.00% White.

There were 24 households, out of which 37.5% had children under the age of 18 living with them, 50.0% were married couples living together, 12.5% had a female householder with no husband present, and 37.5% were non-families. 29.2% of all households were made up of individuals, and 12.5% had someone living alone who was 65 years of age or older. The average household size was 2.63 and the average family size was 3.33.

In the village, the population was spread out, with 30.2% under the age of 18, 12.7% from 18 to 24, 27.0% from 25 to 44, 20.6% from 45 to 64, and 9.5% who were 65 years of age or older. The median age was 32 years. For every 100 females, there were 117.2 males. For every 100 females age 18 and over, there were 120.0 males.

As of 2000 the median income for a household in the village was $29,375, and the median income for a family was $31,250. Males had a median income of $27,813 versus $22,083 for females. The per capita income for the village was $10,014. There were 14.3% of families and 14.5% of the population living below the poverty line, including no under eighteens and 100.0% of those over 64.

== See also ==
- List of municipalities in Nebraska
