= Nebraska Legislature 22nd district =

American legislative district

Nebraska's 22nd legislative district
- Map of Nebraska Legislature districts with the 22nd district shaded in red
Senator
| Mike Moser; R–Columbus |
since 2019
- Demographics: 79.8% White; 1% Black; 19.4% Hispanic; 0.5% Asian; 0.8% Native American
- Population (2020): 38,693

The Nebraska Legislature's 22nd district is one of the 49 legislative districts in the Nebraska Legislature. The district is located in eastern Nebraska and covers Platte County and western Stanton County. Notable settlements in the area include Columbus, Platte Center, Humphrey, Oakland, and Stanton. Mike Moser has represented the district since 2019.

== Demographics ==
The US Census Bureau recorded the population as of 2020 at 38,693.

- 79.8% of the district is White.
- 19.4% of the district is Hispanic.
- 1% of the district is Black.
- 0.8% of the district is Native American.
- 0.5% of the district is Asian.

== List of representatives ==
| Representative | Party | Years of service | Legislature | Residence |
|---|---|---|---|---|
| Mike Moser | Republican | 2019–present | 106th-109th | Columbus |
| Paul Schumacher | Republican | 2011–2019 | 101st-105th | Columbus |
| Arnie Stuthman | Republican | 2003–2011 | 98th-101st | Platte Center |
| Jennie Robak | Democratic | 1989–2003 | 92nd-97th | Columbus |
| Helen Campbell | Republican | 1988–1989 | 91st | Columbus |
| Lee Rupp | Republican | 1983–1987* | 88th-90th | Monroe |
| Donald Dworak | Democratic | 1981–1983 | 87th | Columbus |
| Donald Dworak | Republican | 1975–1981 | 84th-86th | Columbus |
| Herb Nore | Republican | 1965–1975 | 74th-83rd | Genoa |
| Arnold Ruhnke | Republican | 1955–1964 | 67th-73rd | Plymouth |

- Lee Rupp resigned before his term was over. Helen Campbell was appointed to fill the vacancy.
