= Peque =

Peque or variation, may refer to:

== Places ==
- Peque, Antioquia, a municipality in the Department of Antioquia, Colombia
- Peque, Zamora, a municipality in the Province of Zamora, Spain

== People ==
- Peque Gallaga (born 1943), Filipino filmmaker

=== Nicknamed ===
- El Peque, the Spanish-language version of the nickname Shorty
- Peque (futsal player) (born 1987), Spanish futsal player
- Gerard Fernández (born 2002), Spanish soccer player nicknamed "Peque"
- Diego Schwartzman (born 1992), Argentinian tennis player nicknamed "El Peque"
- Peque (footballer, born 1987), María Pérez Fernández, Spanish women's footballer

== Other uses ==
- AISA I-11B Peque, Spanish-made civil utility airplane
- Los Peques, Argentine 3D animated TV show

== See also ==
- PEC (disambiguation)
- Pec (disambiguation)
- Peck (disambiguation)
- Pek (disambiguation)
- PEK (disambiguation)
- PEQ (disambiguation)
