= PEQ =

PEQ or variation may refer to:

- Southern Pomo language (ISO 639 language code peq)
- Pecos Municipal Airport (IATA airport code PEQ), Reeves County, Texas, USA
- PEQ targeting electronics, see List of military electronics of the United States: M–Z#PEQ
- peq (撥), an article, an element of linguistics, in the Shanghainese language
- Programme de l’expérience québécoise (PEQ) immigration program, of Quebec in Canada
- Project EverQuest (ProjectEQ)
- Psychological Evaluation Questionnaire, see 16PF Questionnaire

== See also ==
- PEC (disambiguation)
- Pec (disambiguation)
- Peck (disambiguation)
- Pek (disambiguation)
- PEK (disambiguation)
- Peque (disambiguation)
