= 2008 in Norwegian football =

Football in Norway
- Season: 2008

Men's football
- Tippeligaen: Stabæk
- 1. divisjon: Odd Grenland
- 2. divisjon: Mjøndalen (Group 1); Skeid (Group 2); Stavanger (Group 3); Tromsdalen (Group 4)
- Cupen: Vålerenga

Women's football
- Toppserien: Røa
- 1. divisjon: Sandviken
- Cupen: Røa

The 2008 season was the 103rd season of competitive football in Norway.

== Men's football ==
=== League season ===
==== Promotion and relegation ====
League	Promoted to league	Relegated from league
Tippeligaen	Molde; HamKam; Bodø/Glimt	Odd Grenland; Start; Sandefjord
1. divisjon	Nybergsund; Hødd; Sandnes Ulf; Alta	Raufoss; Tromsdalen; Skeid; Mandalskameratene
2. divisjon	Lyn 2; Østsiden; Skjetten; Valdres; Strømsgodset 2; Vindbjart; Randaberg; Nest-Sotra; Skarbøvik; KIL/Hemne; Lofoten; Senja	Odd Grenland 2; FF Lillehammer; Gjøvik-Lyn; Nardo; Averøykameratene; Start 2; Askøy; Arendal; Harstad; Mjølner; Hammerfest

==== Tippeligaen ====
Pos	Team	Pld	W	D	L	GF	GA	GD	Pts	Qualification or relegation
1	Stabæk (C)	26	16	6	4	58	24	+34	54	Qualification for the Champions League second qualifying round
2	Fredrikstad	26	14	6	6	38	28	+10	48	Qualification for the Europa League third qualifying round
3	Tromsø	26	12	8	6	36	23	+13	44	Qualification for the Europa League second qualifying round
4	Bodø/Glimt	26	12	6	8	37	38	−1	42	
5	Rosenborg	26	11	6	9	40	34	+6	39	Qualification for the Europa League first qualifying round (Note: Rosenborg, ranked second after already qualified Stabæk in the 2008 Fair Play competition will be granted access to the UEFA Europa League first qualifying round after Norway ranked first in the UEFA Fair Play ranking.)
6	Viking	26	11	6	9	38	32	+6	39	
7	Lyn	26	11	5	10	38	34	+4	38	
8	Brann	26	8	9	9	36	36	0	33	
9	Molde	26	7	10	9	39	43	−4	31	
10	Vålerenga	26	8	6	12	31	37	−6	30	Qualification for the Europa League third qualifying round (Note: Vålerenga qualified for the Europa League third qualifying round as 2008 Norwegian Cup winners.)
11	Strømsgodset	26	8	5	13	33	44	−11	29	
12	Lillestrøm	26	7	7	12	30	40	−10	28	
13	Aalesund (O)	26	7	4	15	29	42	−13	25	Qualification for the relegation play-offs
14	HamKam (R)	26	5	6	15	22	50	−28	21	Relegation to First Division

Source: fotball.no
Rules for classification: 1) points; 2) goal difference; 3) number of goals scored.
(C) Champions; (O) Play-off winners; (R) Relegated

==== 1. divisjon ====
Pos	Team	Pld	W	D	L	GF	GA	GD	Pts	Promotion or relegation
1	Odd Grenland (C, P)	30	20	5	5	76	44	+32	65	Promotion to Tippeligaen
2	Sandefjord (P)	30	17	9	4	46	25	+21	60	Promotion to Tippeligaen
3	Start (P)	30	17	8	5	58	34	+24	59	Promotion to Tippeligaen
4	Sogndal	30	15	9	6	53	36	+17	54	Qualification for the promotion play-offs
5	Hønefoss	30	15	6	9	47	33	+14	51	
6	Notodden	30	12	10	8	55	40	+15	46	
7	Haugesund	30	11	9	10	48	47	+1	42	
8	Nybergsund	30	12	6	12	49	53	−4	42	
9	Moss	30	9	12	9	63	54	+9	39	
10	Sarpsborg Sparta	30	10	7	13	45	43	+2	37	
11	Bryne	30	10	6	14	38	53	−15	36	
12	Løv-Ham	30	9	7	14	37	45	−8	34	
13	Kongsvinger	30	8	6	16	33	58	−25	30	
14	Alta	30	8	2	20	49	66	−17	26	
15	Sandnes Ulf (R)	30	5	10	15	36	55	−19	25	Relegation to Second Division
16	Hødd (R)	30	2	8	20	29	76	−47	14	Relegation to Second Division

Source: nifs.no
Rules for classification: 1) points; 2) goal difference; 3) number of goals scored. The winner, runner-up and third place finisher in the 1. divisjon are automatically promoted to the Tippeligaen. The fourth-placed team in the 1. divisjon and the 13th-placed team in the Tippeligaen meet in a playoff at the end of the season. The two teams finishing at the bottom of the table are automatically relegated to the 2. divisjon.
(C) Champions; (P) Promoted; (R) Relegated

==== 2. divisjon ====
===== Group 1 =====
Pos	Team	Pld	W	D	L	GF	GA	GD	Pts	Promotion or relegation
1	Mjøndalen (P)	26	17	4	5	64	34	+30	55	Promotion to First Division
2	Lørenskog	26	16	3	7	48	27	+21	51	
3	Stabæk 2	26	13	5	8	48	34	+14	44	
4	Raufoss	26	13	4	9	55	37	+18	43	
5	Drøbak/Frogn	26	12	5	9	51	40	+11	41	
6	Follo	26	10	7	9	44	35	+9	37	
7	Strømsgodset 2	26	9	7	10	56	68	−12	34	
8	Manglerud Star	26	9	5	12	48	43	+5	32	
9	Valdres	26	6	14	6	40	48	−8	32	
10	Fredrikstad 2	26	9	5	12	36	48	−12	32	
11	Strømmen	26	8	5	13	31	49	−18	29	
12	Modum (R)	26	7	5	14	34	57	−23	26	Relegation to Third Division
13	Østsiden (R)	26	6	7	13	30	52	−22	25	Relegation to Third Division
14	Sprint-Jeløy (R)	26	6	6	14	28	41	−13	24	Relegation to Third Division

(P) Promoted; (R) Relegated

===== Group 2 =====
Pos	Team	Pld	W	D	L	GF	GA	GD	Pts	Promotion or relegation
1	Skeid (P)	26	22	3	1	88	28	+60	69	Promotion to First Division
2	Ranheim	26	16	4	6	74	32	+42	52	
3	Skarbøvik	26	14	5	7	51	38	+13	47	
4	Kristiansund	26	14	2	10	56	32	+24	44	
5	Levanger	26	14	2	10	47	49	−2	44	
6	Lyn 2	26	11	5	10	61	50	+11	38	
7	Byåsen	26	11	5	10	55	51	+4	38	
8	Strindheim	26	10	7	9	49	44	+5	37	
9	Korsvoll	26	10	6	10	37	53	−16	36	
10	Kjelsås	26	9	6	11	32	41	−9	33	
11	Steinkjer	26	10	1	15	56	68	−12	31	
12	Vålerenga 2 (Note: Vålerenga 2 survived as the second best number-twelve-team.)	26	9	3	14	40	58	−18	30	
13	KIL/Hemne (R)	26	3	3	20	33	82	−49	12	Relegation to Third Division
14	Groruddalen (R)	26	2	2	22	23	76	−53	8	Relegation to Third Division

(P) Promoted; (R) Relegated

===== Group 3 =====
Pos	Team	Pld	W	D	L	GF	GA	GD	Pts	Promotion or relegation
1	Stavanger (Note: 2 points deducted?) (P)	26	20	3	3	63	23	+40	61	Promotion to First Division
2	Randaberg	26	17	5	4	68	29	+39	56	
3	Flekkerøy	26	13	3	10	59	42	+17	42	
4	Mandalskameratene	26	12	3	11	60	46	+14	39	
5	Fyllingen	26	11	6	9	45	51	−6	39	
6	Åsane	26	11	4	11	56	53	+3	37	
7	Vard Haugesund	26	10	4	12	44	48	−4	34	
8	Ålgård	26	9	6	11	47	60	−13	33	
9	Vindbjart	26	9	4	13	45	45	0	31	
10	Nest-Sotra	26	8	7	11	46	52	−6	31	
11	Fana	26	9	4	13	43	52	−9	31	
12	Lillestrøm 2 (Note: Lillestrøm 2 survived as the best number-twelve-team.)	26	8	7	11	44	56	−12	31	
13	Os (R)	26	9	3	14	32	50	−18	30	Relegation to Third Division
14	Viking 2 (R)	26	3	7	16	36	81	−45	16	Relegation to Third Division

(P) Promoted; (R) Relegated

===== Group 4 =====
Pos	Team	Pld	W	D	L	GF	GA	GD	Pts	Promotion or relegation
1	Tromsdalen (P)	26	17	5	4	64	24	+40	56	Promotion to First Division
2	Ullensaker/Kisa	26	16	7	3	68	26	+42	55	
3	Tønsberg	26	17	4	5	75	35	+40	55	
4	Pors Grenland	26	15	6	5	62	41	+21	51	
5	Bærum	26	15	1	10	62	39	+23	46	
6	Asker	26	14	2	10	58	52	+6	44	
7	Rosenborg 2 (Note: 2 points deducted?)	26	13	3	10	69	51	+18	40	
8	Mo	26	11	3	12	54	45	+9	36	
9	Skjetten	26	10	4	12	52	53	−1	34	
10	Eidsvold Turn	26	9	4	13	50	55	−5	31	
11	Tromsø 2	26	8	3	15	35	62	−27	27	
12	Senja (R)	26	6	2	18	36	92	−56	20	Relegation to Third Division
13	Skarp (R)	26	5	0	21	28	83	−55	15	Relegation to Third Division
14	Lofoten (R)	26	3	2	21	35	90	−55	11	Relegation to Third Division

(P) Promoted; (R) Relegated

=== Norwegian Cup ===
==== Final ====
9 November 2008
13:15 CET (UTC+1)

Stabæk	1–4	Vålerenga
Andersson 69'	Report	Abdellaoue 31', 54'; Fredheim Holm 50', 70'

Ullevaal Stadion, Oslo
Attendance: 24,823
Referee: Svein Oddvar Moen (Haugar)

== Women's football ==
=== League season ===
==== Promotion and relegation ====
League	Promoted to league	Relegated from league
Toppserien	Fart; FK Larvik	Sandviken; Grand Bodø
1. divisjon	Voss; Gjøvik	Skjetten; Tromsdalen

==== Toppserien ====
Pos	Team	Pld	W	D	L	GF	GA	GD	Pts	Qualification or relegation
1	Røa (C)	22	20	1	1	90	10	+80	61	Qualification for the Champions League round of 32
2	Team Strømmen	22	14	4	4	44	22	+22	46	Qualification for the Champions League qualifying round
3	Asker	22	14	3	5	53	26	+27	45	
4	Kolbotn	22	12	6	4	51	23	+28	42	
5	Arna-Bjørnar	22	12	5	5	58	26	+32	41	
6	Klepp	22	8	7	7	51	30	+21	31	
7	Fløya	22	9	3	10	41	39	+2	30	
8	Amazon Grimstad	22	7	4	11	30	45	−15	25	
9	Trondheims-Ørn	22	6	5	11	26	38	−12	23	
10	Kattem	22	5	2	15	21	67	−46	17	
11	Larvik (R)	22	3	3	16	24	80	−56	12	Relegation to First Division
12	Fart (R)	22	0	1	21	13	86	−73	1	Relegation to First Division

Source: NRK Sport
Rules for classification: 1) points; 2) goal difference; 3) number of goals scored.
(C) Champions; (R) Relegated

=== Norwegian Women's Cup ===
==== Final ====
- Røa 3–1 Team Strømmen

== Men's UEFA competitions ==
=== Champions League ===
==== Qualifying rounds ====
===== Second qualifying round =====
Team 1	Agg.	Team 2	1st leg	2nd leg
Brann (Norway)	2–2 (a)	(Latvia) Ventspils	1–0	1–2

===== Third qualifying round =====
Team 1	Agg.	Team 2	1st leg	2nd leg
Brann (Norway)	1–3	(France) Marseille	0–1	1–2

=== UEFA Cup ===
==== Qualifying rounds ====
===== First qualifying round =====
Team 1	Agg.	Team 2	1st leg	2nd leg
Vėtra (Lithuania)	1–2	(Norway) Viking	1–0	0–2

===== Second qualifying round =====
Team 1	Agg.	Team 2	1st leg	2nd leg
Honka (Finland)	2–1	(Norway) Viking	0–0	2–1
Stabæk (Norway)	2–3	(France) Rennes	2–1	0–2
Copenhagen (Denmark)	7–3	(Norway) Lillestrøm	3–1	4–2

==== First round ====
Team 1	Agg.	Team 2	1st leg	2nd leg
Brann (Norway)	2–2 (2–3 p)	(Spain) Deportivo La Coruña	2–0	0–2 (aet)
Brøndby (Denmark)	3–5	(Norway) Rosenborg	1–2	2–3

==== Group stage ====
===== Group G =====
Pos	Team	Pld	W	D	L	GF	GA	GD	Pts	Qualification	STE	VAL	FCK	BRU	ROS
1	(France) Saint-Étienne	4	2	2	0	9	4	+5	8	Advance to knockout stage	—	2–2	—	—	3–0
2	(Spain) Valencia	4	1	3	0	8	4	+4	6	Advance to knockout stage	—	—	1–1	1–1	—
3	(Denmark) Copenhagen	4	1	2	1	4	5	−1	5	Advance to knockout stage	1–3	—	—	—	1–1
4	(Belgium) Club Brugge	4	0	3	1	2	3	−1	3		1–1	—	0–1	—	—
5	(Norway) Rosenborg	4	0	2	2	1	8	−7	2		—	0–4	—	0–0	—

Source: RSSSF

=== Intertoto Cup ===
==== Second round ====
Team 1	Agg.	Team 2	1st leg	2nd leg
Ekranas (Lithuania)	1–7	(Norway) Rosenborg	1–3	0–4

==== Third round ====
Team 1	Agg.	Team 2	1st leg	2nd leg
NAC Breda (Netherlands)	1–2	(Norway) Rosenborg	1–0	0–2

==== Winners ====
The 11 co-winners were:

- (Portugal) Braga (Overall winners) (round of 16, lost to Paris Saint-Germain)
- (England) Aston Villa (round of 32, lost to CSKA Moscow)
- (Spain) Deportivo La Coruña (round of 32, lost to AaB)
- (Germany) Stuttgart (round of 32, lost to Zenit Saint Petersburg)
- (Norway) Rosenborg (Group stage, fifth in Group G)
- (Italy) Napoli (First round, lost to Benfica)
- (France) Rennes (First round, lost to Twente)
- (Romania) Vaslui (First round, lost to Slavia Prague)
- (Sweden) Elfsborg (Second qualifying round, lost to St Patrick's Athletic)
- (Switzerland) Grasshopper Zürich (Second qualifying round, lost to Lech Poznań)
- (Austria) Sturm Graz (Second qualifying round, lost to Zürich)

== UEFA Women's Cup ==
=== First qualifying round ===
==== Group A4 ====
Pos	Team	Pld	W	D	L	GF	GA	GD	Pts	Qualification	RØA	HON	NSA	IVE
1	(Norway) Røa (H)	2	2	0	0	9	0	+9	6	Advance to second qualifying round	—	2–0	–	w/o
2	(Finland) Honka Espoo	2	1	0	1	6	2	+4	3		–	—	6–0	–
3	(Bulgaria) NSA Sofia	2	0	0	2	0	13	−13	0		0–7	–	—	w/o
4	(Georgia (country)) Iveria Khashuri (W)	0	-	-	-	-	-	—	0		–	w/o	–	—

Source: RSSSF
(H) Hosts; (W) Withdrew

Matches (played in Oslo, Norway)

Røa 2–0 Honka Espoo
Honka Espoo 6–0 NSA Sofia
NSA Sofia 0–7 Røa

=== Second qualifying round ===
==== Group B1 ====
Pos	Team	Pld	W	D	L	GF	GA	GD	Pts	Qualification	ZPE	FRA	RØA	GLA
1	(Russia) Zvezda Perm	3	3	0	0	5	1	+4	9	Advance to quarter-finals	—	–	–	1–0
2	(Germany) Frankfurt	3	2	0	1	6	3	+3	6	Advance to quarter-finals	0–1	—	3–1	–
3	(Norway) Røa (H)	3	1	0	2	8	7	+1	3		1–3	–	—	–
4	(Scotland) Glasgow City	3	0	0	3	2	10	−8	0		–	1–3	1–6	—

Source: RSSSF
(H) Hosts

Matches (played in Oslo, Norway)

Glasgow City 1–6 Røa
1. FFC Frankfurt 3–1 Røa
Røa 1–3 Zvezda 2005 Perm

== National teams ==
=== Norway men's national football team ===
==== 2010 FIFA World Cup qualification (UEFA) ====
===== Group 9 =====
Pos	Team	Pld	W	D	L	GF	GA	GD	Pts	Qualification	(Netherlands)	(Norway)	(Scotland)	(North Macedonia)	(Iceland)
1	Netherlands	8	8	0	0	17	2	+15	24	Qualification to 2010 FIFA World Cup	—	2–0	3–0	4–0	2–0
2	Norway	8	2	4	2	9	7	+2	10		0–1	—	4–0	2–1	2–2
3	Scotland	8	3	1	4	6	11	−5	10		0–1	0–0	—	2–0	2–1
4	Macedonia	8	2	1	5	5	11	−6	7		1–2	0–0	1–0	—	2–0
5	Iceland	8	1	2	5	7	13	−6	5		1–2	1–1	1–2	1–0	—

==== Fixtures and results ====
Date	Venue	Opponents	Score	Competition	Norway scorers
6 February	Racecourse Ground, Wrexham (A)	Wales	0–3; Report	Friendly	
26 March	Podgorica City Stadium, Podgorica (A)	Montenegro	1–3; Report	Friendly	John Carew
28 May	Ullevaal Stadion, Oslo (H)	Uruguay	2–2; Report	Friendly	Tarik Elyounoussi; John Arne Riise
20 August	Ullevaal Stadion, Oslo (H)	Republic of Ireland	1–1; Report	Friendly	Tore Reginiussen
6 September	Ullevaal Stadion, Oslo (H)	Iceland	2–2; Report	World Cup Qualifier	Steffen Iversen (2)
11 October	Hampden Park, Glasgow (A)	Scotland	0–0; Report	World Cup Qualifier	
15 October	Ullevaal Stadion, Oslo (H)	Netherlands	0–1; Report	World Cup Qualifier	
19 November	Olympic Stadium, Kyiv (A)	Ukraine	0–1	Friendly	

Key

- H = Home match
- A = Away match
- N = Neutral ground
