= PEC =

PEC may refer to:

== Groups, organizations, companies ==
- Pakistan Engineering Council
- Pedernales Electric Cooperative
- President's Export Council
- Mormon Priesthood Executive Committee, now high council meeting
- Private Equity Council
- Puntland Electoral Commission, Somalia

== Schools ==
- Pokhara Engineering College, a technical college in Nepal
- Pondicherry Engineering College, India
- Punjab Engineering College, Chandigarh, India

== Science, technology, engineering, medicine ==
- Packet Error Checking, a CRC-8 checksum for SMBus communication
- PEC (cable system) or Pan European Crossing, a European fibre optic network
- Perfect electric conductor
- Peripheral Event Controller, an implementation of autonomous peripheral operations in microcontrollers
- Perivascular epithelioid cell tumour (PEC tumour)
- Planetary Exploration of China, a Solar System space exploration program from China
- Position error correction, a correction applied to the altitude or airspeed of an aircraft to eliminate the error in the static pressure
- Posta Elettronica Certificata, a certified email protocol used in Italy

== Other uses ==
- Plain English Campaign
- Pelican Seaplane Base, an airport in Alaska with IATA code PEC
- Proposta de Emenda à Constituição, a plan for amending the state's Constitution in Brazilian law
- PEC Zwolle, a Dutch professional football club based in Zwolle, Netherlands

== See also ==
- Pec (disambiguation)
- Peck (disambiguation)
- Pek (disambiguation)
- PEK (disambiguation)
- PEQ (disambiguation)
- Peque (disambiguation)
