= 2008–09 UEFA Women's Cup qualifying round =

Tournament details
- Dates: 4 September–14 October 2008
- Teams: 43

The 2008–09 UEFA Women's Champions League qualifying round was played on 4, 6 and 9 September 2008 and 9, 11 and 14 October 2008. A total of 43 teams competed in the qualifying round to decide the 8 places in the knockout phase of the 2008–09 UEFA Women's Cup.

== First qualifying round ==
=== Group A1 ===
Tournament in Šiauliai (Lithuania).

Pos	Team	Pld	W	D	L	GF	GA	GD	Pts	Qualification	ZPE	GUN	FEM	KIK
1	(Russia) Zvezda Perm	3	3	0	0	17	0	+17	9	Advance to second qualifying round	—	8–0	–	8–0
2	(Lithuania) Gintra-Universitetas (H)	3	1	1	1	4	10	−6	4		–	—	2–0	–
3	(Hungary) Femina	3	1	0	2	3	4	−1	3		0–1	–	—	3–1
4	(Faroe Islands) KÍ Klaksvík	3	0	1	2	3	13	−10	1		–	2–2	–	—

Source: RSSSF
(H) Hosts
4 September 2008
12:00 (CET)

Femina (Hungary)	3–1	(Faroe Islands) KÍ Klaksvík
Sebestyén 22'; Pádár 26', 35'	Report	Jacobsen 85'

Savivaldybė Stadium, Šiauliai
Referee: Emilia Wnuk (Poland)
4 September 2008
16:00 (CET)

Zvezda Perm (Russia)	8–0	(Lithuania) Gintra-Universitetas
Barbashina 7'; Kurochkina 21', 42', 49', 59', 90+2'; Savchenkova 23'; Djatel 65'	Report

Savivaldybė Stadium, Šiauliai
Referee: Mihaela Gurdon Bašimamović (Croatia)

6 September 2008
12:00 (CET)

Zvezda Perm (Russia)	8–0	(Faroe Islands) KÍ Klaksvík
Zinchenko 13', 55'; Kurochkina 17', 65'; Patawary 69'; Lyshafay 70'; Barbashina 80'; Korovushkina 85'	Report

Savivaldybė Stadium, Šiauliai
Referee: Natalia Aleksakhina (Ukraine)
6 September 2008
16:00 (CET)

Gintra-Universitetas (Lithuania)	2–0	(Hungary) Femina
Goal	Report

Savivaldybė Stadium, Šiauliai
Referee: Mihaela Gurdon Bašimamović (Croatia)

9 September 2008
14:00 (CET)

Femina (Hungary)	0–1	(Russia) Zvezda Perm
	Report	Zinchenko 90+4'

Aukštaitija Stadium, Panevėžys
Referee: Emilia Wnuk (Poland)
9 September 2008
14:00 (CET)

KÍ Klaksvík (Faroe Islands)	2–2	(Lithuania) Gintra-Universitetas
Jacobsen 67'; Andreasen 85' (pen.)	Report	Alekperova 34'; Kudytė 53'

Savivaldybė Stadium, Šiauliai
Referee: Natalia Aleksakhina (Ukraine)

=== Group A2 ===
Tournament in Niš (Serbia).

Pos	Team	Pld	W	D	L	GF	GA	GD	Pts	Qualification	GLA	AZ	MCN	NCH
1	(Scotland) Glasgow City	3	2	1	0	16	1	+15	7	Advance to second qualifying round	—	–	–	11–0
2	(Netherlands) AZ	3	2	1	0	12	2	+10	7		1–1	—	4–1	–
3	(Serbia) Masinac Classic Niš (H)	3	1	0	2	16	9	+7	3		0–4	–	—	15–1
4	(Moldova) Narta Chişinău	3	0	0	3	1	33	−32	0		–	0–7	–	—

Source: RSSSF
(H) Hosts
4 September 2008
14:30 (CET)

AZ (Netherlands)	1–1	(Scotland) Glasgow City
Demarteau 14'	Report	Stewart 44'

Stadion FK Rudar, Aleksinački Rudnik
Referee: Esther Azzopardi (Malta)
4 September 2008
16:30 (CET)

Masinac Classic Niš (Serbia)	15–1	(Moldova) Narta Chişinău
Jovanović 16', 19', 38', 72', 74'; Sretenović 21', 22', 90'; Trajković 28', 47', 56'; A. Vitanza 32'; Nikolić 59'; Pešić 78' (pen.); Cvetković 90'	Report	Paduraru 90'

Mašinac stadium, Niš
Referee: Christina Pedersen (Norway)

6 September 2008
16:30 (CET)

Masinac Classic Niš (Serbia)	0–4	(Scotland) Glasgow City
	Report	Lindner 17'; Brown 20', 45'; Littlejohn 47'

Mašinac stadium, Niš
Referee: Esther Azzopardi (Malta)
6 September 2008
16:30 (CET)

Narta Chişinău (Moldova)	0–7	(Netherlands) AZ
	Report	Ninicu 27' (o.g.); de Ridder 45+2', 52', 71', 84'; van den Heiligenberg 69'; Kok 77'

Stadion FK Rudar, Aleksinački Rudnik
Referee: Berta Tavares (Portugal)

9 September 2008
16:30 (CET)

AZ (Netherlands)	4–1	(Serbia) Masinac Classic Niš
de Ridder 24'; Koster 35'; Fishlock 54'; Oudemast 90'	Report	Jovanović 83'

Mašinac stadium, Niš
Referee: Christina Pedersen (Norway)
9 September 2008
16:30 (CET)

Glasgow City (Scotland)	11–0	(Moldova) Narta Chişinău
Fernon 17', 32'; L. Ross 31', 39', 49', 87'; Cernalevscaia 34' (o.g.); Brown 36'; Stewart 42'; Lindner 43'; J. Ross 81'	Report

Stadion FK Rudar, Aleksinački Rudnik
Referee: Berta Tavares (Portugal)

=== Group A3 ===
Tournament in Skiponjat (Macedonia)

Pos	Team	Pld	W	D	L	GF	GA	GD	Pts	Qualification	LEV	SPR	TIE	SKI
1	(Spain) Levante	3	2	1	0	18	2	+16	7	Advance to second qualifying round	—	0–0	–	9–0
2	(Czech Republic) Sparta Prague	3	2	1	0	12	0	+12	7		–	—	3–0	9–0
3	(Belgium) Tienen	3	1	0	2	10	14	−4	3		2–9	–	—	–
4	(North Macedonia) Skiponjat (H)	3	0	0	3	2	26	−24	0		–	–	2–8	—

Source: RSSSF
(H) Hosts
4 September 2008
16:30 (CET)

Sparta Prague (Czechoslovakia)	3–0	(Belgium) Tienen
Ondrušová 9'; Šmeralová 39'; Martínková 65'	Report

Stadion Blagoj Istatov, Strumica
Referee: Alessia Lazzaretto (Italy)
4 September 2008
16:30 (CET)

Levante (Spain)	9–0	(North Macedonia) Skiponjat
Peque 2', 4', 35'; Donaire 22'; Conti 48', 57' (pen.), 65'; González 76'; Berisha 83' (o.g.)	Report

Stadion Kukuš, Strumica
Referee: Teodora Albon (Romania)

6 September 2008
16:30 (CET)

Sparta Prague (Czech Republic)	9–0	(North Macedonia) Skiponjat
Riegelová 29'; Martínková 44', 51'; Došková 45+1'; Pivoňková 47'; Heroldová 62'; Šmeralová 85', 86'; Ondrušová 90+3'	Report

Stadion Blagoj Istatov, Strumica
Referee: Katalin Kulcsár (Hungary)
6 September 2008
16:30 (CET)

Tienen (Belgium)	2–9	(Spain) Levante
Brichet 27'; Ebhodaghe 67'	Report	del Río 6', 61'; Vilanova 9'; Donaire 33', 44', 70'; Conti 40', 78', 80'

Stadion Kukuš, Strumica
Referee: Alessia Lazzaretto (Italy)

9 September 2008
16:30 (CET)

Levante (Spain)	0–0	(Czechoslovakia) Sparta Prague
	Report

Stadion Blagoj Istatov, Strumica
Referee: Teodora Albon (Romania)
9 September 2008
16:30 (CET)

Skiponjat (North Macedonia)	2–8	(Belgium) Tienen
Mileska 12'; Latifovik 56'	Report	Ebhodaghe 18', 19', 58', 90'; Vanelderen 66', 77'; Cayman 86'; Vandermotte 88'

Stadion Kukuš, Strumica
Referee: Katalin Kulcsár (Hungary)

=== Group A4 ===
Tournament in Oslo (Norway). Georgia's champion FC Iveria Khashuri withdrew their team from the competition.

Pos	Team	Pld	W	D	L	GF	GA	GD	Pts	Qualification	RØA	HON	NSA	IVE
1	(Norway) Røa (H)	2	2	0	0	9	0	+9	6	Advance to second qualifying round	—	2–0	–	w/o
2	(Finland) Honka Espoo	2	1	0	1	6	2	+4	3		–	—	6–0	–
3	(Bulgaria) NSA Sofia	2	0	0	2	0	13	−13	0		0–7	–	—	w/o
4	(Georgia (country)) Iveria Khashuri (W)	0	-	-	-	-	-	—	0		–	w/o	–	—

Source: RSSSF
(H) Hosts; (W) Withdrew
4 September 2008
14:30 (CET)

NSA Sofia (Bulgaria)	w/o	(Georgia (country)) Iveria Khashuri
	Report

Røa Stadium, Oslo
4 September 2008
17:30 (CET)

Røa (Norway)	2–0	(Finland) Honka Espoo
C. Knutsen 10' (pen.); Huffman 42'	Report

Marienlyst Stadion, Drammen
Referee: Zuzana Kováčová (Slovakia)

6 September 2008
15:00 (CET)

Honka Espoo (Finland)	6–0	(Bulgaria) NSA Sofia
Helenius 9', 75'; Ruotsalainen 11', 13', 15'; Saari 42'	Report

Marienlyst Stadion, Drammen
Referee: Ginta Pēce (Latvia)
6 September 2008
15:00 (CET)

Røa (Norway)	w/o	(Georgia (country)) Iveria Khashuri
	Report

Røa Stadium, Oslo

8 September 2008
17:30 (CET)

NSA Sofia (Bulgaria)	0–7	(Norway) Røa
	Report	G. Knutsen 19', 44'; Mykjåland 31'; Nordby 45+1' (pen.); Huffman 65'; Haavi 78', 82'

Marienlyst Stadion, Drammen
9 September 2008
17:30 (CET)

Iveria Khashuri (Georgia (country))	w/o	(Finland) Honka Espoo
	Report

Sofiemyr stadion, Kolbotn

=== Group A5 ===
Tournament in Šaľa (Slovakia).

Pos	Team	Pld	W	D	L	GF	GA	GD	Pts	Qualification	VAL	MHO	SDŠ	CAR
1	(Iceland) Valur	3	3	0	0	23	3	+20	9	Advance to second qualifying round	—	–	6–2	8–1
2	(Israel) Maccabi Holon	3	1	1	1	3	11	−8	4		0–9	—	1–1	–
3	(Slovakia) Slovan Šaľa (H)	3	0	2	1	3	7	−4	2		–	–	—	0–0
4	(Wales) Cardiff City	3	0	1	2	2	10	−8	1		–	1–2	–	—

Source: RSSSF
(H) Hosts
4 September 2008
11:00 (CET)

Valur (Iceland)	8–1	(Wales) Cardiff City
Townsend 15' (o.g.); Viðarsdóttir 23', 27', 39'; Lárusdóttir 37', 57'; Logadóttir 64'; Sigurðardóttir 84'	Report	Frayne 34'

Šaľa Stadium, Šaľa
Referee: Anouk de Jong (Netherlands)
4 September 2008
16:00 (CET)

Maccabi Holon (Israel)	1–1	(Slovakia) Slovan Šaľa
Ohana 20'	Report	Bíróová 22'

Šaľa Stadium, Šaľa
Referee: Tanja Subotič (Slovenia)

6 September 2008
11:00 (CET)

Valur (Iceland)	6–2	(Slovakia) Slovan Šaľa
Sigurðardóttir 15'; Viðarsdóttir 44', 46', 49'; Bjarnadóttir 89'; Atladóttir 90+2'	Report	Lukácsová 76', 90+3'

Šaľa Stadium, Šaľa
Referee: Olga Tanschi (Moldova)
6 September 2008
16:00 (CET)

Cardiff City (Wales)	1–2	(Israel) Maccabi Holon
Atkins 25'	Report	Redman 6'; Ohana 19'

Šaľa Stadium, Šaľa
Referee: Anouk de Jong (Netherlands)

9 September 2008
11:00 (CET)

Maccabi Holon (Israel)	0–9	(Iceland) Valur
	Report	Goal

Anton Malatinský Stadium, Trnava
Referee: Olga Tanschi (Moldova)
9 September 2008
11:00 (CET)

Slovan Šaľa (Slovakia)	0–0	(Wales) Cardiff City
	Report

Šaľa Stadium, Šaľa
Referee: Tanja Subotič (Slovenia)

=== Group A6 ===
Tournament in Osijek (Croatia).

Pos	Team	Pld	W	D	L	GF	GA	GD	Pts	Qualification	ALM	CLU	OSI	GLE
1	(Kazakhstan) Alma	3	3	0	0	14	2	+12	9	Advance to second qualifying round	—	–	3–1	8–0
2	(Romania) Clujana	3	2	0	1	10	4	+6	6		1–3	—	–	6–0
3	(Croatia) Osijek (H)	3	0	1	2	3	7	−4	1		–	1–3	—	–
4	(Northern Ireland) Glentoran	3	0	1	2	1	15	−14	1		–	–	1–1	—

Source: RSSSF
(H) Hosts
4 September 2008
17:00 (CET)

Alma (Kazakhstan)	3–1	(Croatia) Osijek
Goal	Report	Goal

Gradski Vrt Stadium, Osijek
Referee: Marianne Svendsen (Denmark)
4 September 2008
20:00 (CET)

Clujana (Romania)	6–0	(Northern Ireland) Glentoran
Spânu 3', 24', 27', 53'; Laiu 13', 51'	Report

Gradski Vrt Stadium, Osijek
Referee: Ausra Kance (Lithuania)

6 September 2008
17:00 (CET)

Alma (Kazakhstan)	8–0	(Northern Ireland) Glentoran
Goal	Report

Gradski Vrt Stadium, Osijek
Referee: Dilan Deniz Gökçek (Turkey)
6 September 2008
20:00 (CET)

Osijek (Croatia)	1–3	(Romania) Clujana
Kalamiza 29'	Report	Iușan 66'; Sârghe 82', 86'

Gradski Vrt Stadium, Osijek
Referee: Ausra Kance (Lithuania)

9 September 2008
17:00 (CET)

Clujana (Romania)	1–3	(Kazakhstan) Alma
Dușa 9'	Report	Aniskovtseva 26'; Yalova 60', 74'

Stadion HNK Cibalia, Vinkovci
Referee: Marianne Svendsen (Denmark)
9 September 2008
17:00 (CET)

Glentoran (Northern Ireland)	1–1	(Croatia) Osijek
Ganter 1'	Report	Joščak 8'

Gradski Vrt Stadium, Osijek
Referee: Dilan Deniz Gökçek (Turkey)

=== Group A7 ===
Tournament in Neulengbach (Austria).

Pos	Team	Pld	W	D	L	GF	GA	GD	Pts	Qualification	NEU	DEZ	KRK	VID
1	(Austria) Neulengbach (H)	3	3	0	0	18	0	+18	9	Advance to second qualifying round	—	–	6–0	8–0
2	(Portugal) 1.º de Dezembro	3	1	1	1	8	6	+2	4		0–4	—	–	7–1
3	(Slovenia) KRKA Novo Mesto	3	1	1	1	10	7	+3	4		–	1–1	—	–
4	(Cyprus) Vamos Idaliou	3	0	0	3	1	24	−23	0		–	–	0–9	—

Source: RSSSF
(H) Hosts
4 September 2008
14:00 (CET)

1.º de Dezembro (Portugal)	7–1	(Cyprus) Vamos Idaliou
Couto 11', 27', 45', 68'; Silva 43'; Pinto 74'; Gouveia 90+3'	Report	Kasabova 90+1'

Wienerwaldstadion, Neulengbach
Referee: Danijela Marković (Serbia)
4 September 2008
17:30 (CET)

Neulengbach (Austria)	6–0	(Slovenia) KRKA Novo Mesto
Rosana 7', 13'; Burger 22', 40', 44'; Gstöttner 34'	Report

Wienerwaldstadion, Neulengbach
Referee: Knarik Grigoryan (Armenia)

6 September 2008
13:00 (CET)

KRKA Novo Mesto (Slovenia)	1–1	(Portugal) 1.º de Dezembro
Goal	Report	Goal

Wienerwaldstadion, Neulengbach
Referee: Danijela Marković (Serbia)
6 September 2008
17:00 (CET)

Neulengbach (Austria)	8–0	(Cyprus) Vamos Idaliou
Goal	Report

Wienerwaldstadion, Neulengbach
Referee: Ivana Kosturova (Slovakia)

9 September 2008
14:00 (CET)

Vamos Idaliou (Cyprus)	0–9	(Slovenia) KRKA Novo Mesto
	Report	Pavlović 4', 80'; Salkunič 12', 59'; Stipič 24', 29', 57'; Horvat 85'; Bogolin 87'

Wienerwaldstadion, Neulengbach
Referee: Ivana Kosturova (Slovakia)
9 September 2008
17:00 (CET)

1.º de Dezembro (Portugal)	0–4	(Austria) Neulengbach
	Report	Burger 24', 59', 62', 65'

Wienerwaldstadion, Neulengbach
Referee: Knarik Grigoryan (Armenia)

=== Group A8 ===
Tournament in Wrocław (Poland).

Pos	Team	Pld	W	D	L	GF	GA	GD	Pts	Qualification	NAF	WRO	PAOK	LTA
1	(Ukraine) Naftokhimik	3	3	0	0	4	1	+3	9	Advance to second qualifying round	—	–	1–0	–
2	(Poland) AZS Wrocław (H)	3	2	0	1	8	1	+7	6		0–1	—	–	4–0
3	(Greece) PAOK	3	1	0	2	3	5	−2	3		–	0–4	—	3–0
4	(Estonia) Levadia Tallinn	3	0	0	3	1	9	−8	0		1–2	–	–	—

Source: RSSSF
(H) Hosts
4 September 2008
12:30 (CET)

PAOK (Greece)	3–0	(Estonia) Levadia Tallinn
Panteliadou 26', 30'; Tsiapanou 38'	Report

GEM Boiska, Wrocław
Referee: Jana Adámková (Czech Republic)
4 September 2008
17:00 (CET)

AZS Wrocław (Poland)	0–1	(Ukraine) Naftokhimik
	Report	Luik 61'

GEM Boiska, Wrocław
Referee: Gordana Kuzmanović (Serbia)

6 September 2008
12:30 (CET)

AZS Wrocław (Poland)	4–0	(Estonia) Levadia Tallinn
Goal	Report

GEM Boiska, Wrocław
Referee: Elia Martínez (Spain)
6 September 2008
17:00 (CET)

Naftokhimik (Ukraine)	1–0	(Greece) PAOK
Luik 81'	Report

GEM Boiska, Wrocław
Referee: Gordana Kuzmanović (Serbia)

9 September 2008
17:00 (CET)

PAOK (Greece)	0–4	(Poland) AZS Wrocław
	Report	Tomić 17' (o.g.); Żelazko 22'; Płonowska 48'; Chatziangelou 81' (o.g.)

Oporowska Stadium, Wrocław
Referee: Jana Adámková (Czech Republic)
9 September 2008
17:00 (CET)

Levadia Tallinn (Estonia)	1–2	(Ukraine) Naftokhimik
Jekimova 82' (pen.)	Report	Phewa 16'; Luik 90+1'

GEM Boiska, Wrocław
Referee: Elia Martínez (Spain)

=== Group A9 ===
Tournament in Sarajevo (Bosnia and Herzegovina).

Pos	Team	Pld	W	D	L	GF	GA	GD	Pts	Qualification	ZUR	GAL	UVI	SFK
1	(Switzerland) Zürich	3	2	1	0	6	3	+3	7	Advance to second qualifying round	—	–	–	3–2
2	(Republic of Ireland) Galway	3	1	1	1	2	2	0	4		0–2	—	–	–
3	(Belarus) Universitet Vitebsk	3	1	1	1	3	4	−1	4		1–1	0–2	—	–
4	(Bosnia and Herzegovina) SFK Sarajevo (H)	3	0	1	2	3	5	−2	1		–	0–0	1–2	—

Source: RSSSF
(H) Hosts
4 September 2008
15:00 (CET)

Universitet Vitebsk (Belarus)	1–1	(Switzerland) Zürich
Buzinova 14'	Report	Bernauer 56'

City Stadium SRC Slavija, Istočno Sarajevo
Referee: Petra Pavlíková (Slovakia)
4 September 2008
15:00 (CET)

SFK Sarajevo (Bosnia and Herzegovina)	0–0	(Republic of Ireland) Galway
	Report

Stadion Grbavica, Sarajevo
Referee: Yuliya Medvedeva-Keldyusheva (Kazakhstan)

6 September 2008
15:00 (CET)

Universitet Vitebsk (Belarus)	0–2	(Republic of Ireland) Galway
	Report	Mullins; Fahy

Stadion Grbavica, Sarajevo
Referee: Petra Pavlíková (Slovakia)
6 September 2008
15:00 (CET)

Zürich (Switzerland)	3–2	(Bosnia and Herzegovina) SFK Sarajevo
Goal	Report	Goal

City Stadium SRC Slavija, Istočno Sarajevo
Referee: Eleni Kiriou (Greece)

9 September 2008
15:00 (CET)

SFK Sarajevo (Bosnia and Herzegovina)	1–2	(Belarus) Universitet Vitebsk
Goal	Report	Goal

Stadion Grbavica, Sarajevo
Referee: Eleni Kiriou (Greece)
9 September 2008
15:00 (CET)

Galway (Republic of Ireland)	0–2	(Switzerland) Zürich
	Report	Zumbühl 6'; Bernauer 76' (pen.)

City Stadium SRC Slavija, Istočno Sarajevo
Referee: Yuliya Medvedeva-Keldyusheva (Kazakhstan)

== Second qualifying round ==
=== Group B1 ===
Tournament in Oslo (Norway).

Pos	Team	Pld	W	D	L	GF	GA	GD	Pts	Qualification	ZPE	FRA	RØA	GLA
1	(Russia) Zvezda Perm	3	3	0	0	5	1	+4	9	Advance to quarter-finals	—	–	–	1–0
2	(Germany) Frankfurt	3	2	0	1	6	3	+3	6	Advance to quarter-finals	0–1	—	3–1	–
3	(Norway) Røa (H)	3	1	0	2	8	7	+1	3		1–3	–	—	–
4	(Scotland) Glasgow City	3	0	0	3	2	10	−8	0		–	1–3	1–6	—

Source: RSSSF
(H) Hosts
9 October 2008
14:00 (CET)

Frankfurt (Germany)	0–1	(Russia) Zvezda Perm
	Report	Kostraba 67'

Marienlyst Stadion, Drammen
Referee: Silvia Spinelli (Italy)
9 October 2008
18:30 (CET)

Glasgow City (Scotland)	1–6	(Norway) Røa
Corsie 4'	Report	Huffman 7', 26'; Edner 21', 77'; Mykjåland 29', 61'

Marienlyst Stadion, Drammen
Referee: Tanja Schett (Austria)

11 October 2008
14:00 (CET)

Frankfurt (Germany)	3–1	(Norway) Røa
Nordby 21' (o.g.); Schatton 27', 41'	Report	G. Knutsen 78'

Marienlyst Stadion, Drammen
Referee: Claudine Brohet (Belgium)
11 October 2008
18:30 (CET)

Zvezda Perm (Russia)	1–0	(Scotland) Glasgow City
Kostraba 88'	Report

Marienlyst Stadion, Drammen
Referee: Silvia Spinelli (Italy)

14 October 2008
15:30 (CET)

Glasgow City (Scotland)	1–3	(Germany) Frankfurt
Lindner 38'	Report	Schatton 29'; Thomas 37', 90'

Sofiemyr stadion, Kolbotn
Referee: Claudine Brohet (Belgium)
14 October 2008
15:30 (CET)

Røa (Norway)	1–3	(Russia) Zvezda Perm
Edner 39'	Report	Barbashina 32', 76'; Djatel 74'

Marienlyst Stadion, Drammen
Referee: Tanja Schett (Austria)

=== Group B2 ===
Tournament in Umeå (Sweden).

Pos	Team	Pld	W	D	L	GF	GA	GD	Pts	Qualification	UME	BAR	VAL	ALM
1	(Sweden) Umeå (H)	3	3	0	0	15	1	+14	9	Advance to quarter-finals	—	–	5–1	6–0
2	(Italy) Bardolino	3	2	0	1	5	7	−2	6	Advance to quarter-finals	0–4	—	–	2–1
3	(Iceland) Valur	3	1	0	2	11	8	+3	3		–	2–3	—	–
4	(Kazakhstan) Alma	3	0	0	3	1	16	−15	0		–	–	0–8	—

Source: RSSSF
(H) Hosts
9 October 2008
16:00 (CET)

Bardolino (Italy)	2–1	(Kazakhstan) Alma
Boni 12'; Panico 75'	Report	Stolpovskaya 44'

Gammliavallen, Umeå
Referee: Bibiana Steinhaus (Germany)
9 October 2008
19:00 (CET)

Umeå (Sweden)	5–1	(Iceland) Valur
Ljungberg 10', 29', 41'; Edlund 52'; Marta 76'	Report	Viðarsdóttir 51'

Gammliavallen, Umeå
Referee: Kateryna Monzul (Ukraine)

11 October 2008
12:00 (CET)

Valur (Iceland)	2–3	(Italy) Bardolino
Viðarsdóttir 45' (pen.), 81'	Report	Parisi 4'; Paliotti 38'; Girelli 74'

Gammliavallen, Umeå
Referee: Cristina Dorcioman (Romania)
11 October 2008
15:00 (CET)

Umeå (Sweden)	6–0	(Kazakhstan) Alma
Marta 6', 32'; Bachmann 10', 15', 29'; Rasmussen 36'	Report

Gammliavallen, Umeå
Referee: Kateryna Monzul (Ukraine)

14 October 2008
16:00 (CET)

Alma (Kazakhstan)	0–8	(Iceland) Valur
	Report	Viðarsdóttir 3', 20', 33'; Lárusdóttir 13'; Gísladóttir 27', 63'; Bjarnadóttir 59', 81'

Gammliavallen, Umeå
Referee: Cristina Dorcioman (Romania)
14 October 2008
19:00 (CET)

Bardolino (Italy)	0–4	(Sweden) Umeå
	Report	Bachmann 55'; Marta 62', 90+2'; Rönnlund 65' (pen.)

Gammliavallen, Umeå
Referee: Bibiana Steinhaus (Germany)

=== Group B3 ===
Tournament in Lyon (France).

Pos	Team	Pld	W	D	L	GF	GA	GD	Pts	Qualification	LYO	ARS	NEU	ZUR
1	(France) Lyon (H)	3	3	0	0	18	1	+17	9	Advance to quarter-finals	—	3–0	8–0	–
2	(England) Arsenal	3	2	0	1	13	5	+8	6	Advance to quarter-finals	–	—	6–0	7–2
3	(Austria) Neulengbach	3	1	0	2	5	17	−12	3		–	–	—	5–3
4	(Switzerland) Zürich	3	0	0	3	6	19	−13	0		1–7	–	–	—

Source: RSSSF
(H) Hosts
9 October 2008
19:00 (CET)

Arsenal (England)	7–2	(Switzerland) Zürich
Davison 9'; Smith 37'; Little 39', 57', 90+1' (pen.); Ludlow 52', 56'	Report	Lendenmann 19'; Fahey 66' (o.g.)

Stade Honneur, Limonest
Referee: Natalia Avdonchenko (Russia)
9 October 2008
19:00 (CET)

Lyon (France)	8–0	(Austria) Neulengbach
Abily 9', 77'; Necib 10', 43'; Schelin 13'; Bompastor 19'; Georges 36'; Thomis 39'	Report

Stade de Gerland, Lyon
Referee: Jenny Palmqvist (Sweden)

11 October 2008
17:00 (CET)

Zürich (Switzerland)	1–7	(France) Lyon
Imhasly 34'	Report	Bretigny 2'; Kátia 28', 43', 72'; Schelin 66', 69'; Abily 83'

Stade de Gerland, Lyon
Referee: Jenny Palmqvist (Sweden)
11 October 2008
18:00 (CET)

Arsenal (England)	6–0	(Austria) Neulengbach
Fleeting 21'; Little 33'; Carney 55', 74'; Tracy 85'; Davison 88'	Report

Stade Honneur, Limonest
Referee: Kirsi Heikkinen (Finland)

14 October 2008
19:00 (CET)

Lyon (France)	3–0	(England) Arsenal
Schelin 27', 80'; Abily 76'	Report

Stade de Gerland, Lyon
Referee: Natalia Avdonchenko (Russia)
14 October 2008
19:00 (CET)

Neulengbach (Austria)	5–3	(Switzerland) Zürich
Tasch 6', 45+2'; Gstöttner 24'; Gumpenberger 43'; Burger 57'	Report	Lendenmann 15'; Steinegger 66', 82'

Stade Honneur, Limonest
Referee: Kirsi Heikkinen (Finland)

=== Group B4 ===
Tournament in Kalush and Ivano-Frankivsk (Ukraine).

Pos	Team	Pld	W	D	L	GF	GA	GD	Pts	Qualification	DUI	BRØ	LEV	NAF
1	(Germany) Duisburg	3	3	0	0	14	2	+12	9	Advance to quarter-finals	—	4–1	–	5–1
2	(Denmark) Brøndby	3	2	0	1	7	5	+2	6	Advance to quarter-finals	–	—	1–0	5–1
3	(Spain) Levante	3	1	0	2	4	7	−3	3		0–5	–	—	–
4	(Ukraine) Naftokhimik (H)	3	0	0	3	3	14	−11	0		–	–	1–4	—

Source: RSSSF
(H) Hosts
9 October 2008
14:00 (CET)

Brøndby (Denmark)	1–0	(Spain) Levante
Christensen 64'	Report

MCS Rukh, Ivano-Frankivsk
Referee: Gyöngyi Gaál (Hungary)
10 October 2008
14:00 (CET)

Duisburg (Germany)	5–1	(Ukraine) Naftokhimik
Laudehr 15', 28'; Grings 52' (pen.), 81'; Kayikçi 82'	Report	Ro Hernández 85'

Khimik Stadium, Kalush
Referee: Nicole Petignat (Switzerland)

12 October 2008
10:00 (CET)

Brøndby (Denmark)	5–1	(Ukraine) Naftokhimik
Paaske Sørensen 18'; Pape 45' (pen.), 73'; Jensen 88'; Blitz Kragh 90+2'	Report	Luik 86'

Khimik Stadium, Kalush
Referee: Maaren Olander (Estonia)
12 October 2008
14:00 (CET)

Levante (Spain)	0–5	(Germany) Duisburg
	Report	Grings 4', 7'; Laudehr 30', 63'; Hartmann 79'

MCS Rukh, Ivano-Frankivsk
Referee: Gyöngyi Gaál (Hungary)

14 October 2008
14:00 (CET)

Duisburg (Germany)	4–1	(Denmark) Brøndby
Grings 11'; Brogaard 23' (o.g.); Fuss 65'; Røddik 68' (o.g.)	Report	Christensen 18'

MCS Rukh, Ivano-Frankivsk
Referee: Nicole Petignat (Switzerland)
14 October 2008
14:00 (CET)

Naftokhimik (Ukraine)	1–4	(Spain) Levante
Pasichnyk 43'	Report	Prim 27'; Pérez 44'; R. Castillo 66'; Ves 90+1'

Khimik Stadium, Kalush
Referee: Maaren Olander (Estonia)
