= Senator Peck =

Senator Peck may refer to:

- Asahel Peck (1803–1879), Vermont State Senate
- Bethuel Peck (1788–1862), New York State Senate
- Cassius Peck (1842–1913), Vermont State Senate
- Ebenezer Peck (1805–1881), Illinois State Senate
- Hamilton S. Peck (1845–1933), Vermont State Senate
- Harrison J. Peck (1842–1913), Minnesota State Senate
- Jacob Peck (1779–1869), Tennessee State Senate
- Jedediah Peck (1748–1821), New York State Senate
- John Overly Peck (1900–1979), Nebraska State Senate
- Roy Peck (1922–1983), Wyoming State Senate
- Virgil Peck Jr. (born 1959), Kansas State Senate
