= Gilbert Baker =

Gilbert Baker may refer to:

- Gilbert Baker (artist) (1951–2017), American artist; designer of the rainbow flag
- Gilbert Baker (politician) (born 1956), Republican politician in the U.S. state of Arkansas
- Gilbert Baker (bishop) (1910–1986), Anglican Bishop of Hong Kong and Macau
- Gilbert-Baker Wildlife Management Area, a wildlife management area in Nebraska

== See also ==
- Edmund Gilbert Baker (1864–1949), English plant collector and botanist; son of John Gilbert Baker
- James Gilbert Baker (1914–2005), US astronomer and designer of optics systems
- John Gilbert Baker (1834–1920), English botanist
- Gilbert Barker (1882–1952), Australian rules footballer
