= 2008–09 UEFA Women's Cup knockout phase =

Tournament details
- Dates: 05 November 2008 – 22 May 2009
- Teams: 8

The 2008–09 UEFA Women's Cup knockout phase began on 05 November 2008 and concluded on 16 and 22 May 2009 with the two legged tie at the Central Stadium in Kazan, Russia and the MSV-Arena in Duisburg, Germany to decide the champions of the 2008–09 UEFA Women's Cup. A total of 8 teams competed in the knockout phase.

== Bracket ==
Quarter-finals
(Denmark) Brøndby	2	1	3
(Russia) Zvezda Perm	4	3	7
(England) Arsenal	3	0	3
(Sweden) Umeå	2	6	8
(Italy) Bardolino	0	1	1
(France) Lyon	5	4	9
(Germany) Frankfurt	1	0	1
(Germany) Duisburg	3	2	5

Semi-finals
(Russia) Zvezda Perm	2	2	4
(Sweden) Umeå	0	2	2
(France) Lyon	1	1	2
(Germany) Duisburg	1	3	4

Final
(Russia) Zvezda Perm	0	1	1
(Germany) Duisburg	6	1	7

== Quarter-finals ==
Team 1	Agg.	Team 2	1st leg	2nd leg
Brøndby (Denmark)	3–7	(Russia) Zvezda Perm	2–4	1–3
Arsenal (England)	3–8	(Sweden) Umeå	3–2	0–6
Bardolino (Italy)	1–9	(France) Lyon	0–5	1–4
Frankfurt (Germany)	1–5	(Germany) Duisburg	1–3	0–2

5 November 2008
18:00 (CET)

Brøndby (Denmark)	2–4	(Russia) Zvezda Perm
Christensen 6'; Pape 47'	Report	Barbashina 38', 88'; Djatel 45+2'; Zinchenko 60'

Brøndby Stadium, Brøndby
Attendance: 575
Referee: Alexandra Ihringova (England)
13 November 2008
16:00 (CET)

Zvezda Perm (Russia)	3–1	(Denmark) Brøndby
Djatel 9'; Barbashina 18'; Savchenkova 91'	Report	Pape 53'

Central Stadium, Kazan
Attendance: 3,000
Referee: Snjezana Focic (Croatia)

Zvezda Perm won 7–3 on aggregate

6 November 2008
20:00 (CET)

Arsenal (England)	3–2	(Sweden) Umeå
Ludlow 2'; Fleeting 77'; Little 79'	Report	Yamaguchi 13'; Östberg 71'

Meadow Park, Borehamwood
Attendance: 454
Referee: Floarea Cristina Ionescu (Romania)
12 November 2008
19:00 (CET)

Umeå (Sweden)	6–0	(England) Arsenal
Marta 1', 44', 46', 59'; Ljungberg 48'; Rönnlund 73' (pen.)	Report

Gammliavallen, Umeå
Attendance: 2,493
Referee: Christine Beck (Germany)

Umeå won 8–3 on aggregate

6 November 2008
20:30 (CET)

Bardolino (Italy)	0–5	(France) Lyon
	Report	Schelin 12', 15'; Abily 33'; Franco 68'; Bretigny 89'

Stadio Marc'Antonio Bentegodi, Verona
Attendance: 2,803
Referee: Eva Oedlund (Sweden)
18 November 2008
19:00 (CET)

Lyon (France)	4–1	(Italy) Bardolino
Kátia 38'; Franco 56'; Necib 69'; Bretigny 90+3'	Report	Boni 3'

Stade de Gerland, Lyon
Attendance: 2,980
Referee: Nicole Petignat (Switzerland)

Lyon won 9–1 on aggregate

6 November 2008
14:30 (CET)

Frankfurt (Germany)	1–3	(Germany) Duisburg
Prinz 68'	Report	Grings 7'; Plessen 19' (o.g.); Bresonik 37'

Stadion am Brentanobad, Frankfurt
Attendance: 2,180
Referee: Kateryna Monzul (Ukraine)
13 November 2008
18:00 (CET)

Duisburg (Germany)	2–0	(Germany) Frankfurt
Grings 45'; Bresonik 72'	Report

PCC-Stadion, Duisburg
Attendance: 3,250
Referee: Dagmar Damkova (Czech Republic)

Duisburg won 5–1 on aggregate

== Semi-finals ==
Team 1	Agg.	Team 2	1st leg	2nd leg
Zvezda Perm (Russia)	4–2	(Sweden) Umeå	2–0	2–2
Lyon (France)	2–4	(Germany) Duisburg	1–1	1–3

29 March 2009
16:00 (CET)

Zvezda Perm (Russia)	2–0	(Sweden) Umeå
Zinchenko 9' (pen.); Vera Djatel 50'	Report

Central Stadium, Kazan
Attendance: 600
Referee: Cristina Dorcioman (Romania)
5 April 2009
14:00 (CET)

Umeå (Sweden)	2–2	(Russia) Zvezda Perm
Ljungberg 22'; Edlund 65'	Report	Apanaschenko 30', 76'

Gammliavallen, Umeå
Attendance: 475
Referee: Dagmar Damkova (Czech Republic)

Zvezda Perm won 4–2 on aggregate

28 March 2009
17:00 (CET)

Lyon (France)	1–1	(Germany) Duisburg
Stensland 23'	Report	Maes 67'

Stade de Gerland, Lyon
Attendance: 9,737
Referee: Alexandra Ihringova (England)
5 April 2009
14:00 (CET)

Duisburg (Germany)	3–1	(France) Lyon
Grings 38', 43'; Bresonik 54' (pen.)	Report	Thomis 45'

PCC-Stadion, Duisburg
Attendance: 3,250
Referee: Kirsi Savolainen (Finland)

Duisburg won 4–2 on aggregate

== Finals ==
Team 1	Agg.	Team 2	1st leg	2nd leg
Zvezda Perm (Russia)	1–7	(Germany) Duisburg	0–6	1–1

16 May 2009
17:45 (CET)

Zvezda Perm (Russia)	0–6	(Germany) Duisburg
	Report	Maes 42', 82'; Grings 64' (pen.), 84', 90+1'; Bajramaj 70'

Central Stadium, Kazan
Attendance: 700
Referee: Claudine Brohet (Belgium)
22 May 2009
19:30 (CET)

Duisburg (Germany)	1–1	(Russia) Zvezda Perm
Krahn 45'	Report	Apanaschenko 25'

MSV-Arena,, Duisburg
Attendance: 28,112
Referee: Jenny Palmqvist (Sweden)

Duisburg won 7–1 on aggregate

UEFA Women's Cup
2008-09 winners

Duisburg
First title
