= Donald Dworak =

American politician (1934–2018)

Member of the Nebraska Legislature from the 22nd district
- In office January 8, 1975 – January 5, 1983
- Preceded by: Herb Nore
- Succeeded by: Lee Rupp

Personal details
- Born: December 3, 1934 David City, Nebraska
- Died: September 17, 2018 (aged 83) Columbus, Nebraska
- Party: Republican (until 1981); Democratic (1981–2018)
- Spouse: Judy Kosch (m. 1963)
- Children: 2 (Donald, Anthony)
- Education: University of Nebraska (B.S.)

Donald "Don" N. Dworak (December 3, 1934 – September 17, 2018) was an American politician and insurance executive from Nebraska who served as a member of the Nebraska Legislature from the 22nd district from 1975 to 1983. He was originally elected as a member of the Republican Party, but switched to the Democratic Party in 1981. He later served as director of the Nebraska Department of Economic Development from 1983 to 1985, and as a member of the Nebraska Liquor Commission from 1985 to 1992.

== Early career ==
Dvorak was born in 1934 in David City, Nebraska. He graduated from the University of Nebraska, and worked in insurance and real estate.

== Nebraska Legislature ==
In 1974, State Senator Herb Nore declined to seek re-election to a fourth term, instead launching a brief campaign for Congress. Dworak ran to succeed him in the 22nd district, which included Blaine, Nance, and Platte counties.

In the nonpartisan primary, he faced farmer Kenneth Torczon and Columbus City Councilwoman Everlyn Kusek. In the primary election, Torczon placed first with 43 percent of the vote, Dworak placed second with 42 percent, and they both advanced to the general election. Dworak defeated Torczon in a landslide, winning his first term, 60–40 percent.

During Dworak's first term in the legislature, he sponsored the Nebraska Habitat Stamp Act, which imposed a hunting license fee to fund the acquisition and preservation of new wildlife areas. The Nebraska Wildlife Federation named Dworak the "outstanding conservationist of the year" for his efforts to pass the bill.

In 1978, Dworak considered running for higher office, but ultimately opted to seek a second term in the legislature. He was challenged by Harry Schumacher, an insurance agent. In the primary election, Dworak placed first by a wide margin, receiving 77 percent of the vote to Schumacher's 23 percent. However, on August 22, 1978, Schumacher withdrew from the race, observing that Dworak was "an exceptionally fine competitor that I'm afraid I can't beat." Dworak was re-elected unopposed.

Dworak switched to the Democratic Party in 1981, explaining that "the Nebraska Democratic Party has a broader diversity of people and ideas" and "provides an infinitely broader forum for new ideas and concepts to be openly and freely discussed." Though Dworak's party switch was seen as an effort to seek the Democratic nomination for Governor in 1982, he ultimately declined to run, and did not seek re-election to the legislature.

== Post-legislative career ==
Rather than seek re-election in 1982, Dworak announced that he would run for the 3rd district seat on the University of Nebraska Board of Regents. In the nonpartisan primary, he faced substitute teacher Judy Larsen, corporate executive Margaret Robinson, and banker Jerry Schiermeyer. Dworak placed second in the primary, winning 28 percent of the vote to Robinson's 38 percent, and they advanced to the general election. Robinson ultimately defeated Dworak in a landslide, 63–37 percent.

In 1983, following the election of Governor Bob Kerrey, Dworak was named the director of the Nebraska Department of Economic Development. He announced that he would resign in 1985, and was appointed by Kerrey to the state Liquor Commission. He resigned from the Liquor Commission in 1992 after undergoing heart surgery.

== Death and legacy ==
In 2014, the Nebraska Game and Parks Commission named the Don Dworak Wildlife Management Area, which is located near Monroe, after Dvorak.

Dvorak died on September 17, 2018.
