= Fred Gottschalk =

American politician (1902–1965)

Member of the Nebraska Legislature from the 26th district
- In office January 1, 1963 – January 5, 1965
- Preceded by: John Overly Peck
- Succeeded by: John E. Knight

Personal details
- Born: July 4, 1902 Columbus, Nebraska
- Died: January 12, 1965 (aged 62) near Nebraska City, Nebraska
- Cause of death: Airplane crash
- Party: Democratic
- Spouse: Flora Albin (m. 1947)
- Children: 3 (Frederick, Marty, Carol)
- Education: University of Michigan; University of Nebraska College of Law
- Occupation: Businessman

Frederick "Fred" O. Gottschalk (July 4, 1902 – January 12, 1965) was a Democratic politician from Nebraska who served as a member of the Nebraska Legislature from the 26th district from 1963 to 1965. He died in an airplane crash near Nebraska City, Nebraska.

== Early life ==
Gottschalk was born in Columbus, Nebraska, in 1902, and graduated from Columbus High School. He graduated from the University of Michigan and later attended the University of Nebraska College of Law, but did not graduate. Gottschalk owned several businesses in Columbus, including the United Finance Company and the Gottschalk Insurance Agency, and served on the City Planning Commission, Board of Adjustment, and Zoning Commission.

== Nebraska Legislature ==
In 1962, State Senator John Overly Peck, who represented the 26th district, announced that he would resign from the legislature prior to the start of the next legislative session to spend time with his family. Governor Frank B. Morrison appointed Gottschalk to serve out Peck's term, and he was sworn in on January 1, 1963. Though the legislature was formally nonpartisan, Peck was a registered Republican and Gottschalk was a registered Democrat, and his appointment to the legislature narrowed the Republican majority in the chamber.

Gottschalk ran for a full term in 1964, and was challenged by farmer Sam Luchsinger and businessman Herb Nore. In the nonpartisan primary, Gottschalk placed third, winning 29 percent of the vote to Luchsinger's 38 percent and Nore's 33 percent, and he was the only incumbent senator to lose renomination.

== Death ==
Gottschalk died on January 12, 1965, when a plane he was piloting crashed into the Missouri River several miles north of Nebraska City, Nebraska, during a snowstorm, killing him and his daughter, Carol. Gottschalk was flying with his daughter, who was a student at Monticello College, from Alton, Illinois, to Columbus, Nebraska. A subsequent investigation by the Civil Aeronautics Board concluded that Gottschalk, a non-instrument rated pilot, was at fault for continuing visual flight in adverse weather conditions.
