= Justice Peck =

Justice Peck may refer to:

- Asahel Peck (1803–1879), associate justice of the Vermont Supreme Court
- E. Woolsey Peck (1799–1888), chief justice of the Alabama Supreme Court
- Jacob Peck (1779–1869), associate justice of the Tennessee Supreme Court
- John Weld Peck II (1913–1993), associate justice of the Supreme Court of Ohio
- Louis P. Peck (1918–2008), associate justice of the Vermont Supreme Court
- William Virgil Peck (1804–1877), associate justice of the Supreme Court of Ohio
- William Ware Peck (1821–1897), justice of the Territorial Wyoming Supreme Court

== See also ==
- Judge Peck (disambiguation)
