= Jennie Robak =

American politician (1932–2014)

Member of the Nebraska Legislature from the 22nd district
- In office 1989–2003
- Preceded by: Lee Rupp
- Succeeded by: Arnie Stuthman

Personal details
- Born: May 4, 1932 Surprise, Nebraska, U.S.
- Died: January 3, 2014 (aged 81) Lincoln, Nebraska, U.S.
- Party: Democratic
- Spouse: Cleo Robak
- Children: Kim Robak

Genevieve "Jennie" Hayek Robak (May 4, 1932 – January 3, 2014) was an American politician who was a member of the unicameral Nebraska Legislature.

Robak was born in Surprise, Nebraska and graduated from Ulysses High School. After her marriage, she moved to Lincoln, Nebraska and then to Columbus, Nebraska, where her husband practiced law. A Democrat, Robak served in the non-partisan Nebraska Legislature from 1989 until 2003. She was killed in an auto accident in Lincoln, Nebraska. One of her children, Kim Robak, was the Lieutenant Governor of Nebraska.

Preceded by Lee Rupp	Nebraska Legislature District 22; 1989–2003	Succeeded by Arnie Stuthman
