= Pecs =

Pecs may refer to:

- Pécs, a city in Hungary
  - Pécsi MFC, a football club in the Hungarian city
- The pectoralis major, a major human muscle
- The Prisoner Escort and Custody Services (PECS) contract in England and Wales.
- PECS, the Picture Exchange Communication System, an augmentative and alternative communication system
- PECS, Plan for European Cooperating State, European Space Agency enlargement charters
- Producer Extends, Consumer Super in object programming

== See also ==
- Pec (disambiguation)
- Becs (disambiguation)
- PEX
