= Judge Peck =

Judge Peck may refer to:

- Ebenezer Peck (1805–1881), judge of the United States Court of Claims
- Hamilton S. Peck (1845–1933), judge of the Burlington, Vermont city court
- James H. Peck (1790–1836), judge of the United States District Court for the District of Missouri
- John Weld Peck (1874–1937), judge of the United States District Court for the Southern District of Ohio
- John Weld Peck II (1913–1993), judge of the United States Court of Appeals for the Sixth Circuit
- Samuel Stanley Peck (1829–1901), Ontario judge of the Haliburton County division courts

== See also ==
- Justice Peck (disambiguation)
