= Dawson Brunswick =

American politician

Member-elect of the Nebraska Legislature from the 22nd district
- Assuming office January 6, 2027
- Succeeding: Mike Moser

Personal details
- Party: Republican
- Website: Campaign website

Dawson Brunswick is an American politician from the Nebraska Republican Party who is the senator-elect for the 22nd district in the Nebraska Legislature. He was elected in the 2026 general election. He is president of the Columbus Area Chamber of Commerce.
