= Pęk =

Pęk (Polish pronunciation: [pɛŋk]) is a Polish surname. Notable people include:

- Bogdan Pęk (born 1953), Polish politician
- Karolina Pęk (born 1998), Polish Paralympian
- Marek Pęk (born 1975), Polish politician
