= John Overly Peck =

American politician (1900–1979)

Member of the Nebraska Legislature from the 26th district
- In office January 6, 1959 – January 1, 1963
- Preceded by: August Wagner
- Succeeded by: Fred Gottschalk

Personal details
- Born: August 11, 1900 De Kalb, Missouri
- Died: March 29, 1979 (aged 78) Columbus, Nebraska
- Party: Republican
- Spouse: Mary Riley (m. 1926)
- Children: 2 (JoAnn, John)
- Occupation: Banker

John Overly Peck (August 11, 1900 – March 29, 1979) was a Republican politician from Nebraska who served as a member of the Nebraska Legislature from the 26th district from 1959 to 1963.

== Early life ==
Peck was born in De Kalb, Missouri, in 1900, and graduated from De Kalb High School. He settled in Columbus, Nebraska, where he worked as a banker, serving as the president of the Nebraska Bankers Association. Peck was active in the Nebraska Republican Party, serving as U.S. Senator Hugh A. Butler's finance chairman during his 1952 re-election campaign, and as Victor Anderson's campaign manager during his 1956 gubernatorial campaign.

== Nebraska Legislature ==
In 1958, State Senator August Wagner declined to seek re-election, and Peck ran to succeed him in the 26th district, which included Nance and Platte counties. In the nonpartisan primary, he faced farmer George Louis, and placed first, winning 56 percent of the vote to Louis's 44 percent. They advanced to the general election, where Peck narrowly defeated Louis, winning 51–49 percent.

Peck ran for re-election in 1960, and was challenged by Louis in a rematch of their 1958 race. In the primary election, Peck placed first over Louis, winning 57 percent, and they advanced to the general election. Peck defeated Louis to win re-election, receiving 55 percent of the vote to Louis's 45 percent.

In 1962, Peck ran for re-election, and was re-elected unopposed. However, Peck declined to serve his third term, citing a desire to spend time with his family. Governor Frank B. Morrison appointed Fred Gottschalk to serve out Peck's term.

== Death ==
Peck died on March 29, 1979.
