= Paul Schumacher =

American politician

Member of the Nebraska Legislature from the 22nd district
- In office 2011–2019
- Preceded by: Arnie Stuthman
- Succeeded by: Mike Moser

Personal details
- Born: April 4, 1951 (age 75) Columbus, Nebraska, U.S.
- Party: Republican

Paul Schumacher (born April 4, 1951) is an American politician who served as a member of the unicameral Nebraska Legislature. He resides in Columbus, Nebraska.

== Early life ==
Schumacher graduated from many educational institutions, Humphrey St. Francis in 1969; Platte College in 1971; Fort Hays State College (B.S., summa cum laude) in 1973; and Georgetown University (J.D.) in 1976. He is a member of both the Nebraska and Florida Bar Association. He is the president of Community Lottery Systems, Inc. and the vice-president of Community Internet Systems, Inc. Prior to his appointment to the legislature, he was the Attorney for Platte County.

== State legislature ==
Schumacher was elected in 2010 to represent the 22nd Nebraska legislative district. He was re-elected in 2014 and served the second four-year term allowed. While in the legislature, he was a member of the Banking, Commerce and Insurance, Revenue, and Legislature's Planning Committees.
