= Peč =

- Municipality
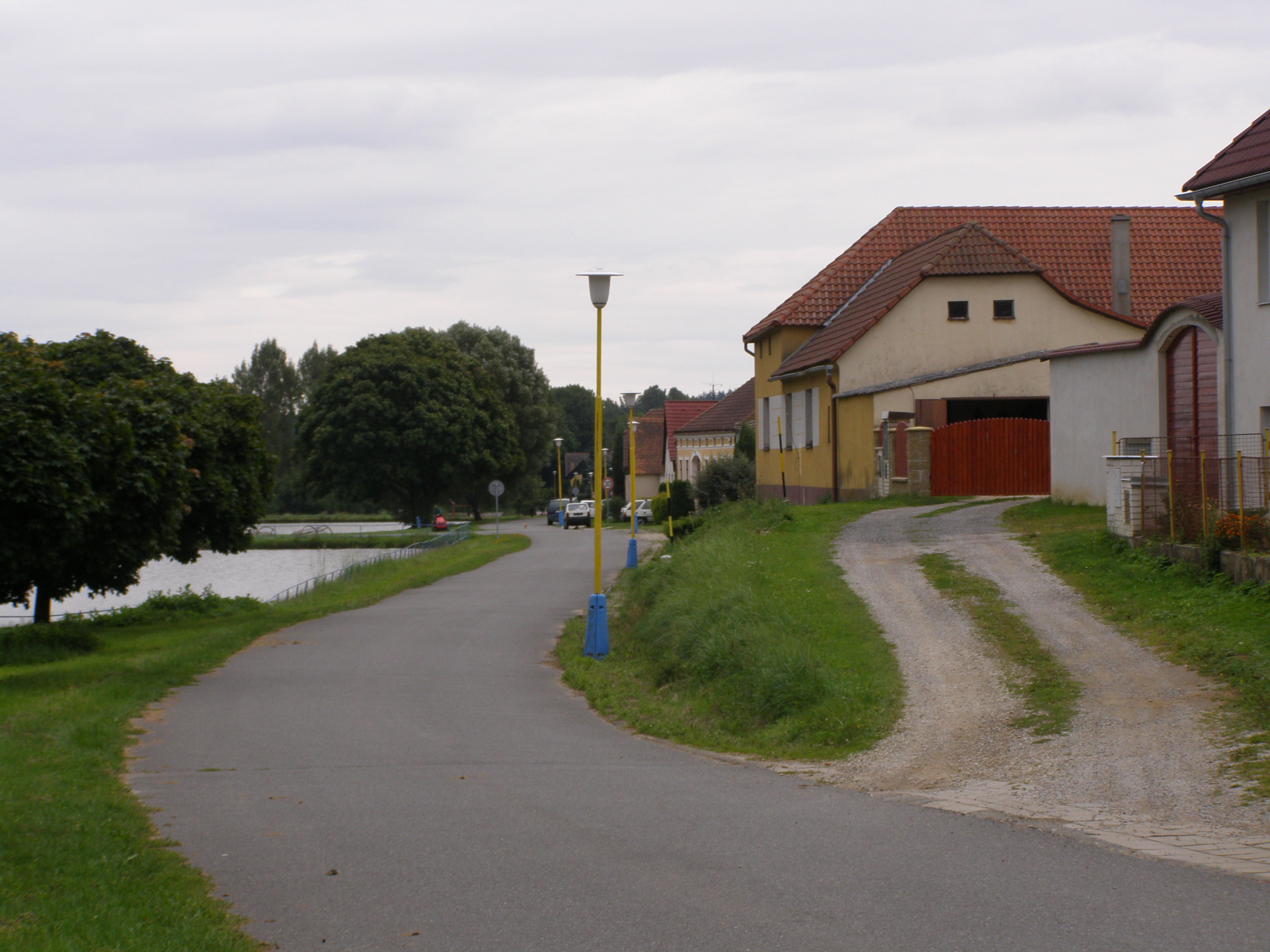
- Centre of Peč

- Location in the Czech Republic
- Coordinates: 49°3′28″N 15°23′33″E
- Country: Czech Republic
- Region: South Bohemian
- District: Jindřichův Hradec
- First mentioned: 1305

Area
  - Total: 18.12 km^{2} (7.00 sq mi)
- Elevation: 481 m (1,578 ft)

Population (2026-01-01)
  - Total: 460
  - Density: 25/km^{2} (66/sq mi)
- Time zone: UTC+1 (CET)
  - Summer (DST): UTC+2 (CEST)
- Postal code: 380 01
- Website: www.pec-obec.cz

Peč is a municipality and village in Jindřichův Hradec District in the South Bohemian Region of the Czech Republic. It has about 500 inhabitants.

Peč lies approximately 31 kilometres (19 mi) east of Jindřichův Hradec, 68 km (42 mi) east of České Budějovice, and 134 km (83 mi) south-east of Prague.

== Administrative division ==
Peč consists of three municipal parts (in brackets population according to the 2021 census):

- Peč (300)
- Lidéřovice (119)
- Urbaneč (44)

== History ==
The first written mention of Peč is from 1305.

== Demographics ==
Historical population
Year	Pop.	±%
1869	719	—
1880	750	+4.3%
1890	721	−3.9%
1900	706	−2.1%
1910	678	−4.0%
1921	681	+0.4%
1930	680	−0.1%
1950	532	−21.8%
1961	479	−10.0%
1970	471	−1.7%
1980	445	−5.5%
1991	400	−10.1%
2001	380	−5.0%
2011	406	+6.8%
2021	463	+14.0%
Source: Censuses
