= 2010 FIFA World Cup qualification – UEFA Group 9 =

Football tournament qualifying stage

The 2010 FIFA World Cup qualification UEFA Group 9 was a UEFA qualifying group for the 2010 FIFA World Cup. The group comprised the Netherlands, Scotland, Norway, Iceland and Macedonia. This group had one team fewer than the other eight.

The group was won by the Netherlands, who qualified for the 2010 FIFA World Cup without dropping a single point in qualification. As runners-up, Norway were in contention for the UEFA play-off stage, but their record was the worst of all runners-up, and so they were eliminated.

== Standings ==
Pos	Team	Pld	W	D	L	GF	GA	GD	Pts	Qualification	(Netherlands)	(Norway)	(Scotland)	(North Macedonia)	(Iceland)
1	Netherlands	8	8	0	0	17	2	+15	24	Qualification to 2010 FIFA World Cup	—	2–0	3–0	4–0	2–0
2	Norway	8	2	4	2	9	7	+2	10		0–1	—	4–0	2–1	2–2
3	Scotland	8	3	1	4	6	11	−5	10		0–1	0–0	—	2–0	2–1
4	Macedonia	8	2	1	5	5	11	−6	7		1–2	0–0	1–0	—	2–0
5	Iceland	8	1	2	5	7	13	−6	5		1–2	1–1	1–2	1–0	—

== Matches ==
The fixtures were decided at a meeting held in Amsterdam, Netherlands on 14 December 2007. The August 2009 date in the international match calendar was moved forward by one week, from 19 August 2009 to 12 August 2009, at the FIFA Executive Committee meeting on 27 May 2008.

6 September 2008
15:00 UTC+2

Macedonia	1–0	Scotland
Naumoski 5'	Report

Philip II Arena, Skopje
Attendance: 9,000
Referee: Pavel Královec (Czech Republic)
6 September 2008
19:00 UTC+2

Norway	2–2	Iceland
Iversen 36' (pen.), 50'	Report	Helguson 39'; Guðjohnsen 69'

Ullevaal Stadion, Oslo
Attendance: 17,254
Referee: Alon Yefet (Israel)

10 September 2008
18:30 UTC±0

Iceland	1–2	Scotland
Guðjohnsen 77' (pen.)	Report	Broadfoot 18'; McFadden 59'

Laugardalsvöllur, Reykjavík
Attendance: 9,767
Referee: Serge Gumienny (Belgium)
10 September 2008
20:30 UTC+2

Macedonia	1–2	Netherlands
Pandev 77' (pen.)	Report	Heitinga 46'; Van der Vaart 59'

Philip II Arena, Skopje
Attendance: 11,000
Referee: Grzegorz Gilewski (Poland)

11 October 2008
15:00 UTC+1

Scotland	0–0	Norway
	Report

Hampden Park, Glasgow
Attendance: 50,205
Referee: Massimo Busacca (Switzerland)
11 October 2008
20:45 UTC+2

Netherlands	2–0	Iceland
Mathijsen 15'; Huntelaar 65'	Report

Feijenoord Stadion, Rotterdam
Attendance: 37,500
Referee: Matteo Simone Trefoloni (Italy)

15 October 2008
19:00 UTC+2

Norway	0–1	Netherlands
	Report	Van Bommel 62'

Ullevaal Stadion, Oslo
Attendance: 23,840
Referee: Konrad Plautz (Austria)
15 October 2008
18:00 UTC±0

Iceland	1–0	Macedonia
V. Gunnarsson 16'	Report

Laugardalsvöllur, Reykjavík
Attendance: 5,527
Referee: Selçuk Dereli (Turkey)

28 March 2009
20:45 UTC+1

Netherlands	3–0	Scotland
Huntelaar 30'; Van Persie 45+1'; Kuyt 77' (pen.)	Report

Amsterdam Arena, Amsterdam
Attendance: 50,000
Referee: Laurent Duhamel (France)

1 April 2009
20:45 UTC+2

Netherlands	4–0	Macedonia
Kuyt 16', 41'; Huntelaar 25'; Van der Vaart 88'	Report

Amsterdam Arena, Amsterdam
Attendance: 47,750
Referee: Peter Rasmussen (Denmark)
1 April 2009
20:00 UTC+1

Scotland	2–1	Iceland
McCormack 39'; S. Fletcher 65'	Report	I. Sigurðsson 54'

Hampden Park, Glasgow
Attendance: 42,259
Referee: Thomas Einwaller (Austria)

6 June 2009
17:45 UTC+2

Macedonia	0–0	Norway
	Report

Philip II Arena, Skopje
Attendance: 7,000
Referee: Paolo Tagliavento (Italy)
6 June 2009
18:45 UTC±0

Iceland	1–2	Netherlands
K. Sigurðsson 87'	Report	De Jong 8'; Van Bommel 15'

Laugardalsvöllur, Reykjavík
Attendance: 9,635
Referee: Mike Dean (England)

10 June 2009
17:45 UTC+2

Macedonia	2–0	Iceland
Stojkov 10'; Ivanovski 86'	Report

Philip II Arena, Skopje
Attendance: 7,000
Referee: Saïd Ennjimi (France)
10 June 2009
20:45 UTC+2

Netherlands	2–0	Norway
Ooijer 32'; Robben 50'	Report

Feijenoord Stadion, Rotterdam
Attendance: 45,600
Referee: Yuri Baskakov (Russia)

12 August 2009
19:00 UTC+2

Norway	4–0	Scotland
J. Riise 35'; Pedersen 45', 90'; Huseklepp 60'	Report

Ullevaal Stadion, Oslo
Attendance: 24,493
Referee: Alain Hamer (Luxembourg)

5 September 2009
15:00 UTC+1

Scotland	2–0	Macedonia
Brown 56'; McFadden 80'	Report

Hampden Park, Glasgow
Attendance: 50,214
Referee: Wolfgang Stark (Germany)
5 September 2009
18:45 UTC±0

Iceland	1–1	Norway
Guðjohnsen 29'	Report	J. Riise 11'

Laugardalsvöllur, Reykjavík
Attendance: 7,321
Referee: Alexandru Tudor (Romania)

9 September 2009
20:30 UTC+2

Norway	2–1	Macedonia
Helstad 2'; J. Riise 25'	Report	Grnčarov 79'

Ullevaal Stadion, Oslo
Attendance: 14,776
Referee: Bruno Paixão (Portugal)
9 September 2009
19:30 UTC+1

Scotland	0–1	Netherlands
	Report	Elia 82'

Hampden Park, Glasgow
Attendance: 51,230
Referee: Claus Bo Larsen (Denmark)

== Goalscorers ==
There were 44 goals scored in 20 matches, for an average of 2.2 goals per match.

3 goals

- (Iceland) Eiður Guðjohnsen
- (Netherlands) Klaas-Jan Huntelaar
- (Netherlands) Dirk Kuyt
- (Norway) John Arne Riise

2 goals

- (Netherlands) Mark van Bommel
- (Netherlands) Rafael van der Vaart
- (Norway) Steffen Iversen
- (Norway) Morten Gamst Pedersen
- (Scotland) James McFadden

1 goal

- (Iceland) Heiðar Helguson
- (Iceland) Veigar Páll Gunnarsson
- (Iceland) Indriði Sigurðsson
- (Iceland) Kristján Örn Sigurðsson
- (North Macedonia) Boban Grncarov
- (North Macedonia) Filip Ivanovski
- (North Macedonia) Ilčo Naumoski
- (North Macedonia) Goran Pandev
- (North Macedonia) Aco Stojkov
- (Netherlands) Eljero Elia
- (Netherlands) Nigel de Jong
- (Netherlands) John Heitinga
- (Netherlands) Joris Mathijsen
- (Netherlands) André Ooijer
- (Netherlands) Robin van Persie
- (Netherlands) Arjen Robben
- (Norway) Thorstein Helstad
- (Norway) Erik Huseklepp
- (Scotland) Kirk Broadfoot
- (Scotland) Scott Brown
- (Scotland) Steven Fletcher
- (Scotland) Ross McCormack

== Attendances ==
Team	Highest	Lowest	Average
Iceland	9,767	5,527	8,063
Macedonia	11,000	7,000	8,500
Netherlands	50,000	37,500	45,213
Norway	24,493	14,776	20,091
Scotland	51,230	42,259	48,477
