= Herb Nore =

American politician (1911–1985)

Herbert Nore

Member of the Nebraska Legislature from the 22nd district
- In office January 5, 1965 – January 8, 1975
- Preceded by: Arnold Ruhnke (redistricted)
- Succeeded by: Donald Dworak

Personal details
- Born: June 16, 1911 Albion, Nebraska
- Died: August 5, 1985 (aged 74) Albion, Nebraska
- Party: Republican
- Spouse: Catharine Garber (m. 1940)
- Children: 3 (Ellen, Betsy, Ann)
- Education: University of Nebraska (B.S.)
- Occupation: High school teacher, farmer

Herbert "Herb" E. Nore (June 16, 1911 – August 5, 1985) was a Republican politician from Nebraska who served as a member of the Nebraska Legislature from the 22nd district from 1965 to 1975.

== Early life ==
Nore was born in Albion, Nebraska, in 1911, and graduated from Albion High School in 1931. He attended the University of Nebraska, graduating with a bachelor's degree in education in 1936. Nore was a high school teacher for eight years, and was a farmer and stockman in Genoa, Nebraska, where he served as president of the Genoa Chamber of Commerce.

== Nebraska Legislature ==
In 1964, following redistricting, appointed State Senator Fred Gottschalk ran for a second term in the 22nd district, which included Nance and Platte counties. Nore ran against him, as did Sam Luchsinger, a farmer. Luchsinger placed first in the primary election, receiving 38 percent of the vote to Nore's 33 percent and Gottschalk's 29 percent. Nore and Luchsinger advanced to the general election, where Nore narrowly won, defeating Luchsinger, 51–49 percent.

Nore ran for re-election to a four-year term in 1966. He was challenged by former Columbus City Councilman Dwayne Smith and farmer Kenneth Torczon. Nore narrowly placed second in the primary, receiving 33 percent of the vote to Torczon's 36 percent and Smith's 31 percent. Nore and Torczon advanced to the general election, and Nore narrowly defeated Torczon with 51 percent of the vote.

In 1970, Nore ran for re-election, and Torczon filed to run against him. However, when Torczon, a member of the Columbus School Board, failed to miss the deadline for incumbent officeholders to file, he ended his campaign; attorney Noyes Rogers, who had supported Torczon, ran in his place. In the primary election, Rogers placed first over Nore, winning 53 percent of the vote to Nore's 47 percent. In the general election, Nore narrowly prevailed, defeating Rogers, 52–48 percent.

Nore declined to run for a fourth term in 1974, instead opting to run for Congress from 3rd district. However, shortly after entering the race, Nore dropped out of the race, citing the ongoing legislative session and the fact that he would "have very little time to campaign[.]"

== Death ==
Nore died on August 5, 1985.
