= Prisca Steinegger =

Swiss footballer (born 1977)

Personal information
- Full name: Prisca Steinegger
- Date of birth: 1 September 1977 (age 49)
- Place of birth: Zürich, Switzerland
- Height: 1.64 m (5 ft 4 1/2 in)
- Position: Central defender

Team information
- Current team: FC Zürich Frauen
- Number: 8

Youth career
- FC Waidberg

Senior career*
Years	Team	Apps	(Gls)
- DFC Blue Stars
- GC/Schwerzenbach
- DFC Blue Stars
1999–	FC Zürich Frauen		

International career
1996–2008	Switzerland	55	(2)
- * Club domestic league appearances and goals

Prisca Steinegger (born 1 September 1977) is a Swiss football player currently playing for FC Zürich and a former captain of the Switzerland national team. She is a left-footed central defender or midfielder.

== Club career ==
Steinegger was offered a scholarship to the University of Georgia in the US in 1999 but had to withdraw because of an injury. She was then employed in the communications department of FIFA.

In 2008 Steinegger was the captain of SV Seebach when they came under the auspices of FC Zürich, becoming FC Zürich Frauen. She had originally joined the club in 1999.

Her early career encompassed spells at FC Waidberg, DFC Blue Stars and GC/Schwerzenbach. In 1993 a 16-year-old Steinegger played in the Swiss Cup final for Blue Stars.

== International career ==
Steinegger won 55 caps as a player in the Switzerland women's national football team from 1996 until 2008 and was named Swiss Player of the Year in 2002–2003. In 1998 she scored an important goal against Poland which stopped the Swiss being relegated from the elite group of women's football in Europe.

Steinegger was named to a World-XI in April 2004 to play Germany as part of FIFA's centenary celebrations. In the match she came on as a substitute for Marta, before 80,000 spectators at the Stade de France.
