= 2008–09 UEFA Women's Cup =

Tournament details
- Dates: 4 September 2008 – 22 May 2009
- Teams: 43 (from 43 confederations)

Final positions
- Champions: (Germany) Duisburg (1st title)
- Runners-up: (Russia) Zvezda Perm

Tournament statistics
- Matches played: 68
- Goals scored: 435 (6.4 per match)
- Top scorer(s): (Iceland) Margrét Lára Viðarsdóttir; 14 goals

The UEFA Women's Cup 2008–09 is the eighth edition of the UEFA Women's Cup football club tournament (since rebranded as the UEFA Women's Champions League), the most important trophy in European club football. The first qualifying round started on 4 September 2008 and the final over two legs was held on 16 and 22 May 2009. Duisburg defeated Zvezda Perm 7–1 on aggregate to claim their first UEFA Cup title.

== Teams ==
Second qualifying round
(Germany) Frankfurt (TH, CH)	(Germany) Duisburg (RU)	(Sweden) Umeå (CH)	(England) Arsenal (CH)
(France) Lyon (CH)	(Denmark) Brøndby (CH)	(Italy) Bardolino (CH)	
First qualifying round
(Russia) Zvezda 2005 Perm (CH)	(Norway) Røa (CH)	(Iceland) Valur (CH)	(Netherlands) AZ (CH)
(Belarus) Universitet Vitebsk (CH)	(Spain) Levante (CH)	(Czech Republic) Sparta Praha (CH)	(Austria) Neulengbach (CH)
(Belgium) Tienen (CH)	(Kazakhstan) Alma (CH)	(Poland) AZS Wrocław (CH)	(Ukraine) Naftokhimik (CH)
(Switzerland) Zürich (CH)	(Serbia) Mašinac Niš (CH)	(Greece) PAOK (CH)	(Hungary) Femina (CH)
(Finland) Honka (CH)	(Bosnia and Herzegovina) ZNK-SFK 2000 (CH)	(Moldova) Narta Chişinău (CH)	(Israel) Maccabi Holon (CH)
(Romania) CFF Clujana (CH)	(Scotland) Glasgow City (CH)	(Portugal) 1° Dezembro (CH)	(Bulgaria) NSA Sofia (CH)
(Slovenia) ŽNK Krka (CH)	(Slovakia) Slovan Duslo Sala (CH)	(Wales) Cardiff City (CW)	(Croatia) Osijek (CH)
(Lithuania) Gintra Universitetas (CH)	(North Macedonia) Skiponjat (CH)	(Faroe Islands) KÍ Klaksvík (CH)	(Northern Ireland) Glentoran (CH)
(Republic of Ireland) Galway (CW)	(Estonia) Levadia Tallinn (CH)	(Cyprus) Vamos Idaliou (CH)	(Georgia (country)) Iveria Khashuri (CH)

== Qualifying round ==
=== First qualifying round ===
==== Group A1 ====
Pos	Team	Pld	W	D	L	GF	GA	GD	Pts	Qualification	ZPE	GUN	FEM	KIK
1	(Russia) Zvezda Perm	3	3	0	0	17	0	+17	9	Advance to second qualifying round	—	8–0	–	8–0
2	(Lithuania) Gintra-Universitetas (H)	3	1	1	1	4	10	−6	4		–	—	2–0	–
3	(Hungary) Femina	3	1	0	2	3	4	−1	3		0–1	–	—	3–1
4	(Faroe Islands) KÍ Klaksvík	3	0	1	2	3	13	−10	1		–	2–2	–	—

Source: RSSSF
(H) Hosts

==== Group A2 ====
Pos	Team	Pld	W	D	L	GF	GA	GD	Pts	Qualification	GLA	AZ	MCN	NCH
1	(Scotland) Glasgow City	3	2	1	0	16	1	+15	7	Advance to second qualifying round	—	–	–	11–0
2	(Netherlands) AZ	3	2	1	0	12	2	+10	7		1–1	—	4–1	–
3	(Serbia) Masinac Classic Niš (H)	3	1	0	2	16	9	+7	3		0–4	–	—	15–1
4	(Moldova) Narta Chişinău	3	0	0	3	1	33	−32	0		–	0–7	–	—

Source: RSSSF
(H) Hosts

==== Group A3 ====
Pos	Team	Pld	W	D	L	GF	GA	GD	Pts	Qualification	LEV	SPR	TIE	SKI
1	(Spain) Levante	3	2	1	0	18	2	+16	7	Advance to second qualifying round	—	0–0	–	9–0
2	(Czech Republic) Sparta Prague	3	2	1	0	12	0	+12	7		–	—	3–0	9–0
3	(Belgium) Tienen	3	1	0	2	10	14	−4	3		2–9	–	—	–
4	(North Macedonia) Skiponjat (H)	3	0	0	3	2	26	−24	0		–	–	2–8	—

Source: RSSSF
(H) Hosts

==== Group A4 ====
Pos	Team	Pld	W	D	L	GF	GA	GD	Pts	Qualification	RØA	HON	NSA	IVE
1	(Norway) Røa (H)	2	2	0	0	9	0	+9	6	Advance to second qualifying round	—	2–0	–	w/o
2	(Finland) Honka Espoo	2	1	0	1	6	2	+4	3		–	—	6–0	–
3	(Bulgaria) NSA Sofia	2	0	0	2	0	13	−13	0		0–7	–	—	w/o
4	(Georgia (country)) Iveria Khashuri (W)	0	-	-	-	-	-	—	0		–	w/o	–	—

Source: RSSSF
(H) Hosts; (W) Withdrew

==== Group A5 ====
Pos	Team	Pld	W	D	L	GF	GA	GD	Pts	Qualification	VAL	MHO	SDŠ	CAR
1	(Iceland) Valur	3	3	0	0	23	3	+20	9	Advance to second qualifying round	—	–	6–2	8–1
2	(Israel) Maccabi Holon	3	1	1	1	3	11	−8	4		0–9	—	1–1	–
3	(Slovakia) Slovan Šaľa (H)	3	0	2	1	3	7	−4	2		–	–	—	0–0
4	(Wales) Cardiff City	3	0	1	2	2	10	−8	1		–	1–2	–	—

Source: RSSSF
(H) Hosts

==== Group A6 ====
Pos	Team	Pld	W	D	L	GF	GA	GD	Pts	Qualification	ALM	CLU	OSI	GLE
1	(Kazakhstan) Alma	3	3	0	0	14	2	+12	9	Advance to second qualifying round	—	–	3–1	8–0
2	(Romania) Clujana	3	2	0	1	10	4	+6	6		1–3	—	–	6–0
3	(Croatia) Osijek (H)	3	0	1	2	3	7	−4	1		–	1–3	—	–
4	(Northern Ireland) Glentoran	3	0	1	2	1	15	−14	1		–	–	1–1	—

Source: RSSSF
(H) Hosts

==== Group A7 ====
Pos	Team	Pld	W	D	L	GF	GA	GD	Pts	Qualification	NEU	DEZ	KRK	VID
1	(Austria) Neulengbach (H)	3	3	0	0	18	0	+18	9	Advance to second qualifying round	—	–	6–0	8–0
2	(Portugal) 1.º de Dezembro	3	1	1	1	8	6	+2	4		0–4	—	–	7–1
3	(Slovenia) KRKA Novo Mesto	3	1	1	1	10	7	+3	4		–	1–1	—	–
4	(Cyprus) Vamos Idaliou	3	0	0	3	1	24	−23	0		–	–	0–9	—

Source: RSSSF
(H) Hosts

==== Group A8 ====
Pos	Team	Pld	W	D	L	GF	GA	GD	Pts	Qualification	NAF	WRO	PAOK	LTA
1	(Ukraine) Naftokhimik	3	3	0	0	4	1	+3	9	Advance to second qualifying round	—	–	1–0	–
2	(Poland) AZS Wrocław (H)	3	2	0	1	8	1	+7	6		0–1	—	–	4–0
3	(Greece) PAOK	3	1	0	2	3	5	−2	3		–	0–4	—	3–0
4	(Estonia) Levadia Tallinn	3	0	0	3	1	9	−8	0		1–2	–	–	—

Source: RSSSF
(H) Hosts

==== Group A9 ====
Pos	Team	Pld	W	D	L	GF	GA	GD	Pts	Qualification	ZUR	GAL	UVI	SFK
1	(Switzerland) Zürich	3	2	1	0	6	3	+3	7	Advance to second qualifying round	—	–	–	3–2
2	(Republic of Ireland) Galway	3	1	1	1	2	2	0	4		0–2	—	–	–
3	(Belarus) Universitet Vitebsk	3	1	1	1	3	4	−1	4		1–1	0–2	—	–
4	(Bosnia and Herzegovina) SFK Sarajevo (H)	3	0	1	2	3	5	−2	1		–	0–0	1–2	—

Source: RSSSF
(H) Hosts

=== Second qualifying round ===
==== Group B1 ====
Pos	Team	Pld	W	D	L	GF	GA	GD	Pts	Qualification	ZPE	FRA	RØA	GLA
1	(Russia) Zvezda Perm	3	3	0	0	5	1	+4	9	Advance to quarter-finals	—	–	–	1–0
2	(Germany) Frankfurt	3	2	0	1	6	3	+3	6	Advance to quarter-finals	0–1	—	3–1	–
3	(Norway) Røa (H)	3	1	0	2	8	7	+1	3		1–3	–	—	–
4	(Scotland) Glasgow City	3	0	0	3	2	10	−8	0		–	1–3	1–6	—

Source: RSSSF
(H) Hosts

==== Group B2 ====
Pos	Team	Pld	W	D	L	GF	GA	GD	Pts	Qualification	UME	BAR	VAL	ALM
1	(Sweden) Umeå (H)	3	3	0	0	15	1	+14	9	Advance to quarter-finals	—	–	5–1	6–0
2	(Italy) Bardolino	3	2	0	1	5	7	−2	6	Advance to quarter-finals	0–4	—	–	2–1
3	(Iceland) Valur	3	1	0	2	11	8	+3	3		–	2–3	—	–
4	(Kazakhstan) Alma	3	0	0	3	1	16	−15	0		–	–	0–8	—

Source: RSSSF
(H) Hosts

==== Group B3 ====
Pos	Team	Pld	W	D	L	GF	GA	GD	Pts	Qualification	LYO	ARS	NEU	ZUR
1	(France) Lyon (H)	3	3	0	0	18	1	+17	9	Advance to quarter-finals	—	3–0	8–0	–
2	(England) Arsenal	3	2	0	1	13	5	+8	6	Advance to quarter-finals	–	—	6–0	7–2
3	(Austria) Neulengbach	3	1	0	2	5	17	−12	3		–	–	—	5–3
4	(Switzerland) Zürich	3	0	0	3	6	19	−13	0		1–7	–	–	—

Source: RSSSF
(H) Hosts

==== Group B4 ====
Pos	Team	Pld	W	D	L	GF	GA	GD	Pts	Qualification	DUI	BRØ	LEV	NAF
1	(Germany) Duisburg	3	3	0	0	14	2	+12	9	Advance to quarter-finals	—	4–1	–	5–1
2	(Denmark) Brøndby	3	2	0	1	7	5	+2	6	Advance to quarter-finals	–	—	1–0	5–1
3	(Spain) Levante	3	1	0	2	4	7	−3	3		0–5	–	—	–
4	(Ukraine) Naftokhimik (H)	3	0	0	3	3	14	−11	0		–	–	1–4	—

Source: RSSSF
(H) Hosts

== Knockout phase ==
=== Bracket ===
Quarter-finals
(Denmark) Brøndby	2	1	3
(Russia) Zvezda Perm	4	3	7
(England) Arsenal	3	0	3
(Sweden) Umeå	2	6	8
(Italy) Bardolino	0	1	1
(France) Lyon	5	4	9
(Germany) Frankfurt	1	0	1
(Germany) Duisburg	3	2	5

Semi-finals
(Russia) Zvezda Perm	2	2	4
(Sweden) Umeå	0	2	2
(France) Lyon	1	1	2
(Germany) Duisburg	1	3	4

Final
(Russia) Zvezda Perm	0	1	1
(Germany) Duisburg	6	1	7

=== Quarter-finals ===
Team 1	Agg.	Team 2	1st leg	2nd leg
Brøndby (Denmark)	3–7	(Russia) Zvezda Perm	2–4	1–3
Arsenal (England)	3–8	(Sweden) Umeå	3–2	0–6
Bardolino (Italy)	1–9	(France) Lyon	0–5	1–4
Frankfurt (Germany)	1–5	(Germany) Duisburg	1–3	0–2

=== Semi-finals ===
Team 1	Agg.	Team 2	1st leg	2nd leg
Zvezda Perm (Russia)	4–2	(Sweden) Umeå	2–0	2–2
Lyon (France)	2–4	(Germany) Duisburg	1–1	1–3

=== Finals ===
Team 1	Agg.	Team 2	1st leg	2nd leg
Zvezda Perm (Russia)	1–7	(Germany) Duisburg	0–6	1–1

16 May 2009
17:45 (CET)

Zvezda Perm (Russia)	0–6	(Germany) Duisburg
	Report	Maes 42', 82'; Grings 64' (pen.), 84', 90+1'; Bajramaj 70'

Central Stadium, Kazan
Attendance: 700
Referee: Claudine Brohet (Belgium)
22 May 2009
19:30 (CET)

Duisburg (Germany)	1–1	(Russia) Zvezda Perm
Krahn 45'	Report	Apanaschenko 25'

MSV-Arena,, Duisburg
Attendance: 28,112
Referee: Jenny Palmqvist (Sweden)

Duisburg won 7–1 on aggregate

UEFA Women's Cup
2008-09 winners

First title

== Top goalscorers ==
(excluding qualifying rounds)

Rank	Player	Team	Goals
1	(Germany) Inka Grings	Duisburg	7
2	(Brazil) Marta	Umeå	4
3	(Ukraine) Daryna Apanaschenko	Zvezda Perm	3
3	(Germany) Linda Bresonik	Duisburg	3
3	(Russia) Natalia Barbashina	Zvezda Perm	3
3	(Ukraine) Vera Djatel	Zvezda Perm	3
3	(Belgium) Femke Maes	Duisburg	3
