= Mimica Pavlović =

Serbian footballer (born 1984)

Personal information
- Full name: Mimica Pavlović
- Date of birth: 1 March 1984 (age 42)
- Place of birth: Kruševac, SFR Yugoslavia
- Position: Defender

Senior career*
Years	Team	Apps	(Gls)
1999–2006	Napredak Krusevac		
2005–2008	Keynsham Town		
2008–2011	Krka Novo Mesto	70	(20)
2011–2012	Crvena Zvezda	11	(5)
2012–2013	Krka Novo Mesto	12	(0)

International career
21	Serbia	24	
- * Club domestic league appearances and goals as of 7 September 2012

Mimica Pavlović (Serbian Cyrillic: Мимица Павловић; born 1 March 1984) is a Serbian football defender, currently playing for Krka Novo Mesto in the Slovenian League. She has also played for Keynsham Town in the English second League and ZFK Crvena Zvezda in the Serbian First League. She has been a member of the Serbia women's national football team.
