= Pec =

Pec may refer to:

== Abbreviations ==
- "Pec" a common abbreviation for pectoralis major muscle, a chest muscle
- The pectoral sandpiper (Calidris melanotos), often abbreviated "pec"

== Places ==
=== Kosovo ===
- Peć, a city in Kosovo also known as Peja
- Peć Bistrica, a river

=== Czech Republic ===
- Pec (Domažlice District), a municipality and village in the Plzeň Region
- Peč, a municipality and village in the South Bohemian Region
- Pec pod Sněžkou, a town in the Hradec Králové Region

== See also ==
- PEC (disambiguation)
- Pecs (disambiguation)
