= Arnie Stuthman =

American politician

Member of the Nebraska Legislature from the 22nd district
- In office 2003–2011
- Preceded by: Jennie Robak
- Succeeded by: Paul Schumacher

Personal details
- Born: June 25, 1941 (age 85) Colfax County, Nebraska, U.S.
- Party: Republican

Arnie Stuthman (born June 25, 1941) is an American politician, farmer, and livestock feeder. He is a former member of the unicameral Nebraska Legislature and resides in Platte Center, Nebraska.

== Personal life ==
Stuthman was born in Colfax County, Nebraska and graduated from Columbus High School in 1959. He was a former member of the U.S. Air National Guard, chairman or president of many agricultural organizations. He currently is the chairman of the Platte County supervisors, board of directors of the Columbus Area Chamber of Commerce and a member of Christ Lutheran Church. He has 4 children: Jeff Todd Amy and Eric. He has 8 grandchildren Christopher, Tony, Hannah, Hillary, Trey, Mitchell, Blair, Will, and Hailee.

== State legislature ==
Stuthman was elected in 2002 to represent the 22nd Nebraska legislative district. He sat on the Committee On Committees; Developmental Disabilities Special Investigative Committee; Health and Human Services; Legislative Performance Audit; Midwest Interstate Passenger Rail Compact Commission; and Transportation and Telecommunications committees.

== See also ==
- Nebraska Legislature

Preceded by Jennie Robak	Nebraska Legislature District 22; 2003–2011	Succeeded by Paul Schumacher
