= Nebraska Department of Economic Development =

The Nebraska Department of Economic Development is the U.S. State of Nebraska agency responsible for economic development in the state. Created by the Nebraska State Legislature in 1967, the department's emphasis is growing and diversifying the state's economic base by fostering new investment and commercial spending throughout the state.

== See also ==
- Economy of Omaha
