= Mike Moser (politician) =

American politician (born 1951)

Member of the Nebraska Legislature from the 22nd district
- Incumbent
- Assumed office January 9, 2019
- Preceded by: Paul Schumacher
- Succeeded by: Dawson Brunswick (elect)

Personal details
- Born: September 18, 1951 (age 75) Fremont, Nebraska, U.S.
- Party: Republican
- Spouse: Jan Waak (m. 1971)
- Children: 3
- Education: Central Community College; University of Nebraska–Lincoln

Mike Moser (born September 18, 1951) is an American politician.

== Personal life ==
Moser was born on September 18, 1951, in Fremont, Nebraska. He is married to Jan Moser.

== Education ==
Moser graduated from Scotus Central Catholic High School in Columbus, Nebraska, in 1969. He earned his associate degree at Central Community college and graduated from University of Nebraska–Lincoln in 1975 with a bachelor's degree.

== Career ==
Moser was mayor of Columbus from 2004 to 2016. In 2010, he tried to run for the Nebraska Legislature in Nebraska's 22nd district. He advanced in the primary but lost the general election to Paul Schumacher.

Eight years later, Moser ran for the Nebraska Legislature from the same district as his predecessor was unable to run again due to term limits. He easily won that election with 64.3% of the votes against Doug Oertwich. He was sworn in as senator on January 9, 2019.

On May 25, 2020, Moser was hospitalized due to COVID-19.

== Electoral history ==
Nebraska's 22nd Legislative District Election, 2022
Primary election
Party	Candidate	Votes	%
Republican	Mike Moser (incumbent)	6,549	76.14
Nonpartisan	Roy M. Zach	1,054	12.25
Democratic	Mike Goos	998	11.60
Total votes		8,601	100.00
General election
Republican	Mike Moser (incumbent)	9,561	80.24
Nonpartisan	Roy M. Zach	2,355	19.76
Total votes		11,916	100.00
Republican hold			

Nebraska's 22nd Legislative District Election, 2018
Primary election
Party	Candidate	Votes	%
Republican	Mike Moser	3,578	56.12
Republican	Doug Oertwich	1,366	21.42
Democratic	Francis P. Kuehler	1,102	17.28
Independent	Kenneth G. Leischner	330	5.18
Total votes		6,376	100.0
General election
Republican	Mike Moser	7,896	64.30
Republican	Doug Oertwich	4,383	35.70
Total votes		12,279	100.0
Republican hold			

Nebraska's 22nd Legislative District Election, 2010
Primary election
Party	Candidate	Votes	%
Republican	Paul Schumacher	1,877	33.87
Republican	Mike Moser	1,873	33.80
Republican	Rebecca J. Rayman	1,257	22.68
Nonpartisan	Roy M. Zach	535	9.65
Total votes		5,542	100.0
General election
Republican	Paul Schumacher	4,974	52.18
Republican	Mike Moser	4,558	47.82
Total votes		9,532	100.0
Republican hold			
