= Lee Rupp =

American politician (1938–2025)

Member of the Nebraska Legislature from the 22nd district
- In office January 5, 1983 – December 31, 1987
- Preceded by: Donald Dworak
- Succeeded by: Helen Campbell

Personal details
- Born: March 3, 1938 Monroe, Nebraska
- Died: September 20, 2025 (aged 87) Columbus, Nebraska
- Party: Republican
- Spouse: Kay Ditter (m. 1958)
- Children: 3
- Education: Norfolk Junior College; University of Nebraska–Lincoln (B.S., M.S.)
- Occupation: Public relations, marine fisheries biologist

Lee Rupp (March 3, 1938 – September 20, 2025) was a Republican politician from Nebraska who served as a member of the Nebraska Legislature from the 22nd district from 1983 to 1987.

== Early life ==
Rupp was born in Monroe, Nebraska, in 1938, and graduated from Monroe High School. He attended Norfolk Junior College, and ultimately graduated from the University of Nebraska–Lincoln with his bachelor's degree in agriculture. Rupp later received his master's degree in biology, and worked as a fisheries biologist for the Nebraska Game and Parks Commission.

== Nebraska Legislature ==
In 1982, when State Senator Donald Dworak declined to seek re-election, Rupp ran to succeed him in the 22nd district. In the nonpatisan primary, Rupp faced former Humphrey City Councilman Francis Sand and farmer Dick Ternes. Rupp placed second in the primary, winning 33 percent of the vote to Sand's 41 percent, and they advanced to the general election. Rupp defeated Sand with 53 percent of the vote.

Rupp ran for re-election in 1986, and was challenged by Ternes. In the primary election, he received 58 percent of the vote to Ternes's 42 percent. Rupp defeated Ternes in the general election with 58 percent of the vote. During his tenure in the legislature, Rupp advocated for wildlife protection and conservation bills.

In 1987, Rupp applied to be the director of the Game and Parks Commission and the vice president for university relations at the University of Nebraska–Lincoln, and was ultimately selected for the position at the University of Nebraska. He resigned his seat in the legislature, effective December 31, 1987, and Governor Kay Orr appointed Helen Campbell as his successor.

== Post-legislative career ==
Rupp served as the vice president for university relations at the University of Nebraska–Lincoln until 1997, when he retired. He was succeeded by State Senator Ron Withem. In 2021, the Game and Parks Commission renamed the Looking Glass Wildlife Management Area, near his hometown of Monroe, the Lee Rupp Wildlife Management Area in his honor.

== Death ==
Rupp died on September 20, 2025, at the age of 87.
