= List of Nebraska Wildlife Management Areas =

List of Nebraska Wildlife Management Areas includes all state and private lands (Open Fields and Waters program or OFW) and waters under the purview of the Nebraska Game and Parks Commission (NGPC), with enforcement by the conservation officers, also known as game wardens.

== Wildlife Management Areas ==
- Alexandria SW WMA
- Alexandria WMA: 1,204.54 acres (487.46 ha) in Jefferson County.
- Alfon C. Haring Memorial WMA
- American Game Marsh WMA
- Anderson Bridge WMA
- Arcadia Diversion Dam WMA
- Arnold Trupp WMA
- Arrowhead WMA
- Ash Grove WMA
- Aspinwall Bend WMA
- Avocet WMA
- Ayr Lake WMA
- Ballards Marsh WMA
- Bassway Strip WMA
- Basswood Ridge WMA
- Bazile Creek WMA
- Bear Creek Lake WMA (NRD)
- Beaver Bend WMA
- Berggren-Young WMA
- Big Alkali Lake WMA
- Bighorn WMA
- Birdwood Lake WMA
- Bittern's Call WMA
- Black Island WMA
- Blue Hole WMA
- Blue River WMA
- Bluebill WMA
- Bluestem WMA
- BlueWing WMA
- Bobcat WMA
- Bobcat Prairie WMA (NRD)
- Bohemia Prairie WMA
- Borman Bridge WMA
- Bowwood WMA
- Box Butte Reservoir WMA
- Box Elder Canyon WMA
- Brady WMA
- Bramble WMA
- Branched Oak WMA: 2,865.56 acres (1,159.65 ha) in Lancaster and Seward counties.
- Buckskin Hills WMA
- Buffalo Creek Wildlife Management Area
- Bulrush WMA
- Bur Oak WMA
- Burton's Bend WMA
- Calamus Reservoir WMA
- Cambridge Diversion Dam WMA
- Catfish Run WMA
- Cedar Canyon WMA
- Cedar Valley WMA: 880 acres (360 ha) in Lincoln County.
- Chadron Creek Ranch WMA
- Chalkrock WMA
- Chat Canyon WMA
- Chester Island WMA
- Chet and Jane Fliesbach WMA
- Clear Creek WMA
- Conestoga Lake WMA
- Cornhusker WMA
- Cottontail WMA
- Cottonwood/Steverson WMA
- Council Creek WMA
- Cozad WMA
- Crescent Lake WMA
- Darr Strip WMA
- Davis Creek Reservoir/WMA: 3,156.00 acres (1,277.19 ha) in Greeley and Valley counties, with 1,100 acres (450 ha) of water.
- DeFair Lake WMA
- Deep Well WMA
- Diamond Lake WMA
- Divoky Acres WMA
- Dogwood WMA
- Don Dworak WMA
- Donald Whitney Memorial WMA
- Dr. Bruce Cowgill WMA
- Dry Creek WMA
- Dry Sandy WMA
- East Gothenburg WMA
- East Hershey WMA
- East Odessa WMA
- East Sutherland WMA
- East Willow Island WMA
- Elk Point Bend WMA
- Elm Creek WMA
- Elwood Reservoir WMA
- Enders Reservoir WMA: 4,359.00 acres (1,764.02 ha) in Chase County
- Father Hupp WMA
- Flat Water Landing WMA
- Flathead WMA
- Flatsedge WMA
- Fort Robinson State Park/WMA: 22,332.72 acres (9,037.73 ha) in Dawes and Sioux counties.
- Four-Mile Creek WMA
- Fred Thomas WMA
- Freemont Slough WMA
- Frenchman WMA
- Frye Lake WMA
- Gadwall WMA
- George D. Syas WMA: 899.80 acres (364.14 ha) in Platte County.
- Gifford Point WMA
- Gilbert-Baker WMA
- Goldeneye WMA (NRD)
- Goldenrod WMA (NRD)
- Goose Lake WMA
- Green Top WMA (NRD)
- Green Wing WMA
- Greenhead WMA
- Greenvale WMA
- Grove Lake WMA
- Guide Rock Diversion Dam WMA: 518.00 acres (209.63 ha) in Webster County.
- Hackberry Creek WMA
- Harold W. Anderson WMA
- Hayes Center WMA
- Hedgefield WMA
- Hershey WMA
- Hickory Ridge WMA
- Hidden Marsh WMA
- High Basin WMA
- Holt Creek WMA
- Hull Lake WMA
- Indian Cave State Park/WMA: 3,399.70 acres (1,375.81 ha) in Nemaha and Richardson counties.
- Jack Sinn Memorial WMA
- James N. Douglas WMA
- Keller WMA
- Killdeer WMA
- Kinter's Ford WMA
- Kiowa WMA
- Kirkpatrick Basin North WMA
- Kirkpatrick Basin South WMA
- Kissinger Basin WMA: 485.84 acres (196.61 ha) in Clay County.
- Larkspur WMA
- Lee Rupp WMA
- Leonard A. Koziol WMA
- Limestone Bluffs WMA
- Little Blue East WMA
- Little Blue WMA
- Little Salt Creek West WMA
- Little Salt Creek WMA
- Little Salt Fork Marsh Preserve WMA (NRD)
- Little Salt Springs WMA (NRD)
- Loch Linda WMA
- Long Pine WMA
- Lores Branch WMA
- Loup Bottoms WMA
- Loup River Public Power District WMA
- Margrave WMA
- Marsh Duck WMA
- Marsh Hawk WMA
- Marsh Wren WMA
- Martin's Reach WMA
- Mayberry WMA
- Meadowlark WMA (NRD)
- Medicine Creek WMA: 8,639.00 acres (3,496.08 ha) in Frontier County.
- Memphis Lake WMA
- Merganser WMA (NRD)
- Meridian WMA
- Merritt Reservoir WMA
- Metcalf WMA
- Milburn WMA
- Mirdan Canal WMA
- Montz Point WMA
- Mulberry WMA
- Muskrat Run WMA
- Myrtle E. Hall WMA
- Narrows WMA
- Nine Mile Creek WMA
- Niobrara Confluence WMA
- North Lake Basin WMA
- North River WMA
- Northeast Sacramento WMA
- O. John Emerson WMA
- Oak Glen WMA
- Oak Falley WMA
- Ogallala Strip WMA
- Olive Creek WMA
- Omadi Bend WMA
- Osage WMA
- Oxford WMA
- Parshall Bridge WMA
- Pawnee Lake WMA
- Pawnee Prairie WMA
- Pawnee Slough WMA
- Peru Bottoms WMA
- Peterson Lake WMA
- Peterson WMA
- Pine Glen WMA
- Pintail WMA
- Platte WMA
- Plum Creek Valley WMA
- Ponderosa WMA
- Powder Creek WMA
- Powder Horn WMA
- Prairie Knoll WMA
- Prairie Marsh WMA
- Pressey WMA
- Rakes Creek WMA
- Randall W. Schilling WMA
- Rat and Beaver Lake WMA
- Red Cedar WMA (NRD)
- Red Fox WMA
- Red Willow Diversion Dam WMA
- Red Willow Reservoir WMA: 5,216.00 acres (2,110.84 ha) in Frontier and Red Willow County.
- Red Wing WMA
- Redbird WMA
- Redhead WMA
- Redtail WMA
- Renquist Basin WMA
- Rhoden WMA
- Rock Glen WMA
- Rose Creek WMA
- Sacramento-Wilcox WMA
- Sandpiper WMA
- Schlagel Creek WMA
- Scotia Canal WMA
- Shell Lake WMA
- Sherman Reservoir WMA
- Shypoke WMA
- Sioux Strip WMA
- Smartweed Marsh West WMA
- Smartweed Marsh WMA
- Smith Lake WMA
- Sora WMA
- South Fork WMA
- South Pine WMA
- South Sacramento WMA
- Southeast Sacramento WMA
- Spikebrush WMA
- Stagecoach Lake WMA
- Straight Water WMA
- Sunny Hollow WMA
- Swan Creek WMA
- Swanson Reservoir WMA/State Recreation Area (SRA): 8,059.00 acres (3,261.36 ha) in Hitchcock County. There is 4,974 acres (2,013 ha) of water surface, 5,253 acres (2,126 ha) of land, and 3,000 acres (1,200 ha) dedicated to hunting around the reservoir.
- Swanton WMA (NRD)
- Table Rock WMA
- Tanglewood WMA (NRD)
- Taylor's Branch WMA
- Teal WMA
- Thomas C. Matter WMA
- Thomas Creek WMA
- Thompson-Barnes WMA
- Timber Point WMA (NRD)
- Triple Creek WMA
- Twin Lakes R.C. WMA
- Twin Lakes WMA
- Two Rivers WMA
- Wagon Train WMA
- Wapiti WMA: 1,920.00 acres (777.00 ha) in Lincoln County.
- Wellfleet WMA
- West Brady WMA
- West Cozad WMA
- West Gothenburg WMA
- West Sacramento WMA
- White Front WMA
- Whitetail WMA
- Wild Plum WMA (NRD)
- Wildwood WMA
- Wilkinson WMA
- Williams Gap WMA
- Willow Island WMA
- Willow Lake B.C. WMA
- Wilson Creek WMA
- Wiseman WMA
- Wolf-Wildcat Wildlife Management Area
- Wood Duck WMA
- Yankee Hill WMA
- Yellowbanks WMA
- Yellowthroat WMA (USFWS)
