= Natalia Barbashina =

Russian footballer and coach (born 1973)

Natalia Barbashina Наталья Барбашина
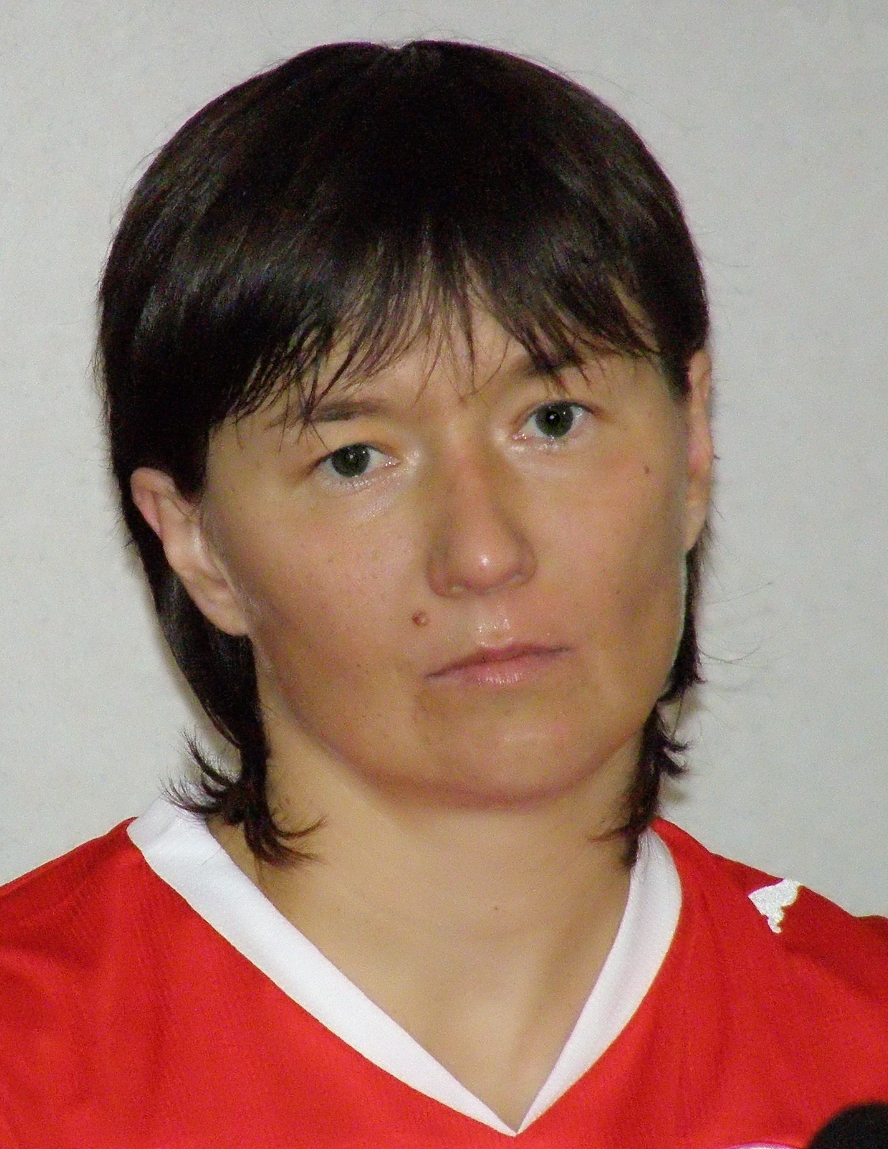

Personal information
- Full name: Natalia Leonidovna Barbashina
- Date of birth: 26 August 1973 (age 53)
- Place of birth: Ussuriysk, Russian SFSR, Soviet Union
- Height: 1.74 m (5 ft 9 in)
- Positions: Midfielder; forward

Senior career*
Years	Team	Apps	(Gls)
1992	Ussurochka		
1993–1998	Energiya Voronezh		
1999–2001	Ryazan		
2002–2004	Lada Togliatti		
2005–2007	Rossiyanka		
2008–2010	Zvezda Perm		

International career
1995–2009	Russia		
- * Club domestic league appearances and goals

Natalia Leontievna Barbashina (Russian: Наталья Леонидовна Барбашина; born 26 August 1973) is a Russian football coach and former player. Her last team was Zvezda Perm, with whom she reached the 2008-09 UEFA Women's Cup Final. Throughout her career she won nine Russian women's football championships and nine national Cups with Energiya Voronezh, Ryazan VDV, Lada Togliatti, Rossiyanka and Zvezda.

== International career ==
Barbashina joined the Russia women's national football team in 1995.

As of 2011, Barbashina was the fifth most capped Russian international player. She played at the 1999 and 2003 World Cups, scoring one goal in each; against Japan and Ghana, respectively. UEFA Women's Euro 2009 marked her last appearance in an international tournament. She had scored an important goal in the qualification play-off against Scotland.

== International goals ==
Scores and results list Russia's goal tally first.

No.	Date	Venue	Opponent	Score	Result	Competition
1.	17 September 1995	Reykjavík, Iceland	Iceland	2–0	1–4	UEFA Women's Euro 1997 qualifying
2.	11 October 1997	Leuven, Belgium	Belgium	1–1	4–3	1999 FIFA Women's World Cup qualification
3.	11 October 1997	Leuven, Belgium	Belgium	3–3	4–3	1999 FIFA Women's World Cup qualification
4.	8 November 1997	Beja, Portugal	Portugal	1–0	2–0	1999 FIFA Women's World Cup qualification
5.	25 April 1998	Tula, Russia	Portugal	1–0	2–0	1999 FIFA Women's World Cup qualification
6.	23 May 1998	Selyatino, Russia	Belgium	1–0	5–1	1999 FIFA Women's World Cup qualification
7.	15 September 1998	Oneonta, United States	Brazil	?–?	2–2	1998 Women's U.S. Cup
8.	23 June 1999	Portland, United States	Japan	4–0	5–0	1999 FIFA Women's World Cup
9.	21 August 1999	Kauniainen, Finland	Finland	1–0	2–0	UEFA Women's Euro 2001 qualifying
10.	2 September 1999	Plauen, Germany	Germany	1–1	1–3	Friendly
11.	9 October 1999	Moscow, Russia	FR Yugoslavia	2–0	4–0	UEFA Women's Euro 2001 qualifying
12.	9 October 1999	Moscow, Russia	FR Yugoslavia	4–0	4–0	UEFA Women's Euro 2001 qualifying
13.	20 May 2000	Selyatino, Russia	Finland	3–0	3–0	UEFA Women's Euro 2001 qualifying
14.	13 August 2000	Annapolis, United States	United States	1–3	1–7	Friendly
15.	18 August 2001	Reykjavík, Iceland	Iceland	1–0	1–1	2003 FIFA Women's World Cup qualification
16.	18 May 2002	Selyatino, Russia	Iceland	1–0	1–1	2003 FIFA Women's World Cup qualification
17.	22 May 2002	Selyatino, Russia	Italy	1–1	2–1	2003 FIFA Women's World Cup qualification
18.	29 September 2002	Uniondale, United States	United States	1–5	1–5	2002 Women's U.S. Cup
19.	2 October 2002	Cary, United States	Italy	1–1	2–1	2002 Women's U.S. Cup
20.	2 October 2002	Cary, United States	Italy	2–1	2–1	2002 Women's U.S. Cup
21.	18 May 2003	Moscow, Russia	Poland	1–0	6–0	UEFA Women's Euro 2005 qualifying
22.	18 May 2003	Moscow, Russia	Poland	6–0	6–0	UEFA Women's Euro 2005 qualifying
23.	9 August 2003	Selyatino, Russia	Iceland	1–1	1–1	UEFA Women's Euro 2005 qualifying
24.	8 September 2003	Dunaújváros, Hungary	Hungary	1–0	3–1	UEFA Women's Euro 2005 qualifying
25.	8 September 2003	Dunaújváros, Hungary	Hungary	2–0	3–1	UEFA Women's Euro 2005 qualifying
26.	23 September 2003	Carson, United States	Ghana	2–0	3–0	2003 FIFA Women's World Cup
27.	26 September 2004	Dijon, France	France	1–0	5–2	UEFA Women's Euro 2005 qualifying
28.	26 September 2004	Dijon, France	France	4–1	5–2	UEFA Women's Euro 2005 qualifying
29.	26 September 2004	Dijon, France	France	5–2	5–2	UEFA Women's Euro 2005 qualifying
30.	3 October 2004	Selyatino, Russia	Hungary	2–0	4–0	UEFA Women's Euro 2005 qualifying
31.	20 October 2004	Moscow, Russia	Finland	1–3	1–3	UEFA Women's Euro 2005 qualifying
32.	9 July 2005	Moscow, Russia	Republic of Ireland	5–0	5–1	2007 FIFA Women's World Cup qualification
33.	28 August 2005	Moscow, Russia	Scotland	2–0	6–0	2007 FIFA Women's World Cup qualification
34.	17 June 2006	Dublin, Ireland	Republic of Ireland	2–0	2–0	2007 FIFA Women's World Cup qualification
35.	27 September 2006	Moscow, Russia	Germany	1–3	2–3	2007 FIFA Women's World Cup qualification
36.	23 August 2007	Anger, Austria	Austria	3–1	5–1	UEFA Women's Euro 2009 qualifying
37.	23 August 2007	Anger, Austria	Austria	5–1	5–1	UEFA Women's Euro 2009 qualifying
38.	5 March 2008	Paralimni, Cyprus	Canada	1–1	1–2	2008 Cyprus Women's Cup
39.	29 May 2008	Krasnoarmeysk, Russia	Israel	4–0	4–0	UEFA Women's Euro 2009 qualifying
40.	26 October 2008	Edinburgh, Scotland	Scotland	3–2	3–2	UEFA Women's Euro 2009 qualifying
