= Peque (footballer, born 1987) =

Spanish footballer

Personal information
- Full name: María Pérez Fernández
- Date of birth: 28 March 1987 (age 39)
- Place of birth: Gijón, Spain
- Height: 1.60 m (5 ft 3 in)
- Position: Striker

Senior career*
Years	Team	Apps	(Gls)
2003–2008	Oviedo Moderno		
2008–2010	Levante	54	(18)
2010–2011	Prainsa Zaragoza	22	(6)
2011	Þór/KA	7	(3)
2011–2014	Levante	81	(13)
2014–2015	Torres		

International career
	Spain U-19	6	
- * Club domestic league appearances and goals as of 12:54, 7 September 2021 (UTC)

María Pérez Fernández (born 28 March 1987), also known as Peque, is a Spanish former footballer who played as a striker.

== Career ==
She began playing football at Sporting de Gijón's installations in the Escuela de Fútbol de Mareo. At 16, she began her career in Oviedo Moderno. Later she signed for Levante UD, the defending Primera División champion. In the summer of 2010, she moved to Prainsa Zaragoza, which she left one year later to play for Iceland's Þór/KA for two months. Following the end of the season for Þór/KA she returned to Levante. In 2014, she signed for Italian club Torres. Half a year later, she announced her return to the Escuela de Fútbol de Mareo.
