= Jacob Peck =

American judge (1779–1869)

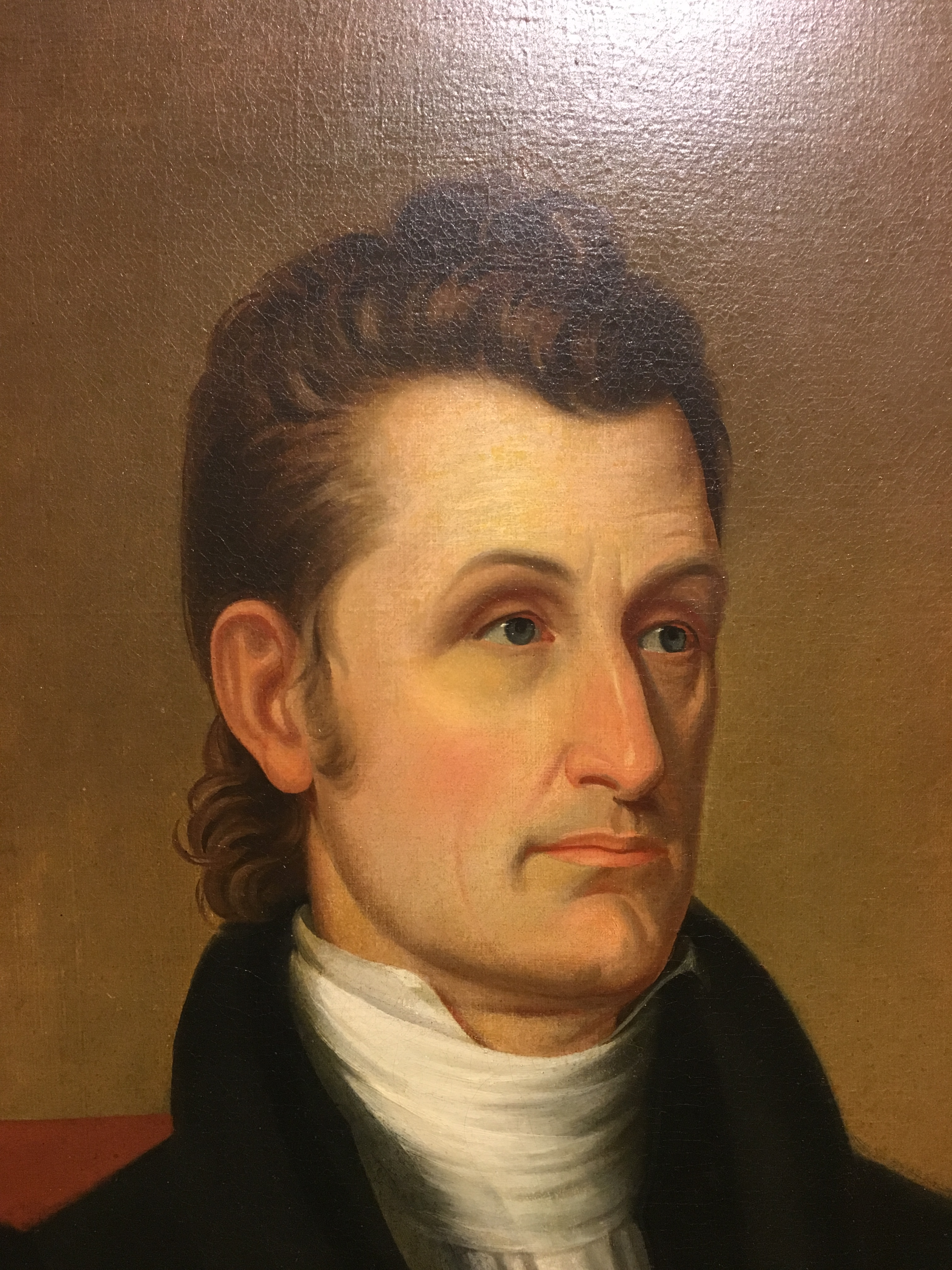
Jacob Peck (1779-1869), a state senator from Greene and Jefferson counties and a justice of the Tennessee Supreme Court, was an amateur geologist who was fond of the chemistry and physical properties of minerals and mineralized artifacts.

Jacob Peck (1779 – June 11, 1869) was a justice of the Tennessee Supreme Court from 1822 to 1834.

Born in Virginia, he was admitted to the practice of law in Tennessee in 1808, and was elected to the Tennessee Senate in 1821, representing Jefferson County and Greene County in eastern Tennessee. In August 1822, he was elected to a seat on the Tennessee Supreme Court vacated by the resignation of Thomas Emmerson. While serving on the Court, he authored a substantial portion of the Court's opinions, with 276 opinions signed.

Although little is known of his formal education, it is apparent that he was also versed in the arts:

A man of eclectic tastes, however, Peck was described by those who knew him as a "refined and cultivated" man with a fondness for poetry, painting, and music who "ever entertained the most liberal and enlightened views on all subjects."

Peck served until the creation of a new Court in the Constitution of 1834. He also compiled and published volume 7 of the Tennessee Reports.
