= Peck (disambiguation) =

A peck is a unit of dry volume.

Peck may also refer to:

- A common misspelling of 'pec' the common abbreviation for the Pectoralis major muscle
- A derogatory term for members of a race of dwarf-like people in the film Willow
- Peck the Penguin, a character from Ryan's World
- Peck Reiter (1899–1968), American football player
- Peck (surname)

== Places ==
=== United States ===
- Peck, Idaho
- Peck, Kansas
- Peck, Michigan
- Peck, Wisconsin

== See also ==
- Justice Peck (disambiguation)
- Pek (disambiguation)
