= Pek =

Pek may refer to:

- Pekoe tea (Pek.), a grade of Ceylon and tea leaf
- Pek, a processed meat product somewhat similar to spam
- Pek (river), a river in eastern Serbia
- Pek, a Ukrainian name of the Slavic deity otherwise known as Peklenc

== People ==
- Pęk, a Polish surname
- Peter Pek, Malaysian businessman
- Khadaffy Janjalani, also known as Pek, (1975–2006), Filipino terrorist leader

== See also ==
- PEK (disambiguation)
- Peck, a measure of volume
- Peck (disambiguation)
- Polyetherketones
