= PEK (disambiguation) =

PEK is an IATA code for Beijing Capital International Airport, serving Beijing, China.

PEK may also refer to:

- Polyetherketones, an engineering plastic
- Pomeranian Evangelical Church (Pommersche Evangelische Kirche), a Protestant church in Mecklenburg-Western Pomerania, Germany
- Program for Evaluating Complementary Medicine, the English translation of Programme Evaluation Komplementärmedizin (PEK)
- Phantom Evil King, a boss in the video game Okage

== See also ==
- Pek (disambiguation)
