= Ron Kresha =

American politician (born 1969)

Member of the Minnesota House of Representatives from the 10A district
- Incumbent
- Assumed office January 8, 2013
- Preceded by: redistricted
- Succeeded by: Mark Streimer (elect)

Personal details
- Born: December 16, 1967 (age 58) Columbus, Nebraska, U.S.
- Party: Republican
- Spouse: Wendy
- Children: 5
- Education: St. Cloud State University (B.A.); Bellevue University (M.B.A.)
- Occupation: Chief operating officer; Legislator
- Website: Government website Campaign website

Ron Kresha (/ˈkriːʃə/ KREE-shə; born December 16, 1969) is an American politician serving in the Minnesota House of Representatives since 2013. A member of the Republican Party of Minnesota, Kresha represents District 10A in north-central Minnesota, which includes the city of Little Falls and parts of Aitkin, Crow Wing, Kanabec, Mille Lacs and Morrison Counties.

== Early life, education and career ==
Kresha was born in Columbus, Nebraska, where he attended Scotus Central Catholic High School. He graduated from St. Cloud State University with a B.A. in English and from Bellevue University with a M.B.A. in finance and accounting.

== Minnesota House of Representatives ==
Kresha was elected to the Minnesota House of Representatives in 2012 and has been reelected every two years since. He first ran for an open seat following legislative redistricting. In 2022, Kresha faced a primary challenge from the right, leading the House Republican Caucus to increase spending in the district to defend his seat.

Kresha serves as the minority lead on the Education Finance Committee and also sits on the Ways and Means Committee. He served as an assistant majority leader from 2015 to 2016 and as majority whip for the Republican House caucus from 2017 to 2018. In 2018, after the retirement of Joyce Peppin, Kresha's name was floated as a potential replacement.

=== Education ===
In 2015, Kresha supported bipartisan legislation to expand early learning scholarships for disadvantaged children, and a bill to target preschool funding to low-income families. He opposed legislation that would create a Department of Early Childhood. He has called for focusing on improving math and literacy scores before legislators "throw money" at the public school system, and called DFL funding proposals "unrealistic".

Kresha has largely opposed Governor Tim Walz's education proposals, calling them "mandates" and saying they would "indoctrinate students with messages that focus on our nation's flaws". He also criticized the Walz administration's handling of grant oversight after the Feeding our Future investigation uncovered one of the largest federal fraud cases in state history. He opposed language requiring comprehensive sex education in elementary and secondary schools.

Kresha has co-authored bills that seek to change the state constitution's language guaranteeing all children the fundamental right to a quality public education, and criticized Education Minnesota, the state's largest teachers' union, for its opposition to the proposal.

During the COVID-19 pandemic, Kresha sponsored legislation to allow local school leaders to determine their own school reopening plans, arguing against a "one-size-fits-all" approach. He also advocated for allowing districts to hold in-person graduation ceremonies.

==== School choice ====
Kresha is a supporter of the school choice movement, and authored legislation to expand school choice and offer tax credits and scholarships to families whose students opt out of public schools. He has argued that more opportunities for private schools would help close the state's education achievement gap.

=== Child protection laws ===
Kresha was a member of Governor Mark Dayton's Task Force on the Protection of Children, and authored the group's 11-point plan to reform the state's child protection laws. The legislation included a provision to mandate child protection reports be sent to law enforcement, and would rank child safety above keeping families intact. The bill unanimously passed the Minnesota House in 2015. He has called for better training of front-line child protection workers.

=== Other political positions ===
Kresha has co-sponsored legislation to provide broadband subsidies to rural communities, saying the private market alone would not provide full broadband coverage. He authored a bill to fund an opioid prevention pilot project in his district. Kresha abstained from a vote to declare racism a public health crisis in the state, saying it was "forcing an opinion based on words".

During the COVID-19 pandemic, Kresha criticized Walz's emergency orders and Attorney General Keith Ellison for taking legal action against business owners who opened bars in defiance of the orders.

Kresha authored a law that prohibits government contracts from being issued to vendors who boycott Israel. In 2015, he visited Turkey as part of a bipartisan delegation sponsored by the Niagara Foundation, a nonprofit organization with ties to Fethullah Gulen.

== Electoral history ==
2012 Minnesota State House - District 9B
Party	Candidate	Votes	%
Republican	Ron Kresha	9,881	52.97
Democratic (DFL)	Adrian Welle	8,751	46.91
Write-in		23	0.12
Total votes		18,655	100.0
Republican hold			

2014 Minnesota State House - District 9B
Party	Candidate	Votes	%
Republican	Ron Kresha (incumbent)	8,449	56.42
Democratic (DFL)	Al Doty	6,518	43.53
Write-in		8	0.05
Total votes		14,975	100.0
Republican hold			

2016 Minnesota State House - District 9B
Party	Candidate	Votes	%
Republican	Ron Kresha (incumbent)	14,139	72.30
Democratic (DFL)	Dustin Simmonds	5,402	27.62
Write-in		15	0.08
Total votes		19,556	100.0
Republican hold			

2018 Minnesota State House - District 9B
Party	Candidate	Votes	%
Republican	Ron Kresha (incumbent)	11,802	72.16
Democratic (DFL)	Stephen Browning	4,548	27.81
Write-in		5	0.03
Total votes		16,355	100.0
Republican hold			

2020 Minnesota State House - District 9B
Party	Candidate	Votes	%
Republican	Ron Kresha (incumbent)	16,855	77.09
Democratic (DFL)	Laura Wright	4,979	22.77
Write-in		29	0.13
Total votes		21,863	100.0
Republican hold			

2022 Minnesota State House - District 10A
Party	Candidate	Votes	%
Republican	Ron Kresha (incumbent)	15,947	96.31
Write-in		611	3.69
Total votes		16,558	100.0
Republican hold			

== Personal life ==
Kresha is married to his wife, Wendy. They have five children and reside in Little Falls, Minnesota.
