= Lakeview Junior-Senior High School (Nebraska) =

Coordinates: 41°29′52″N 97°22′28″W

Lakeview High School
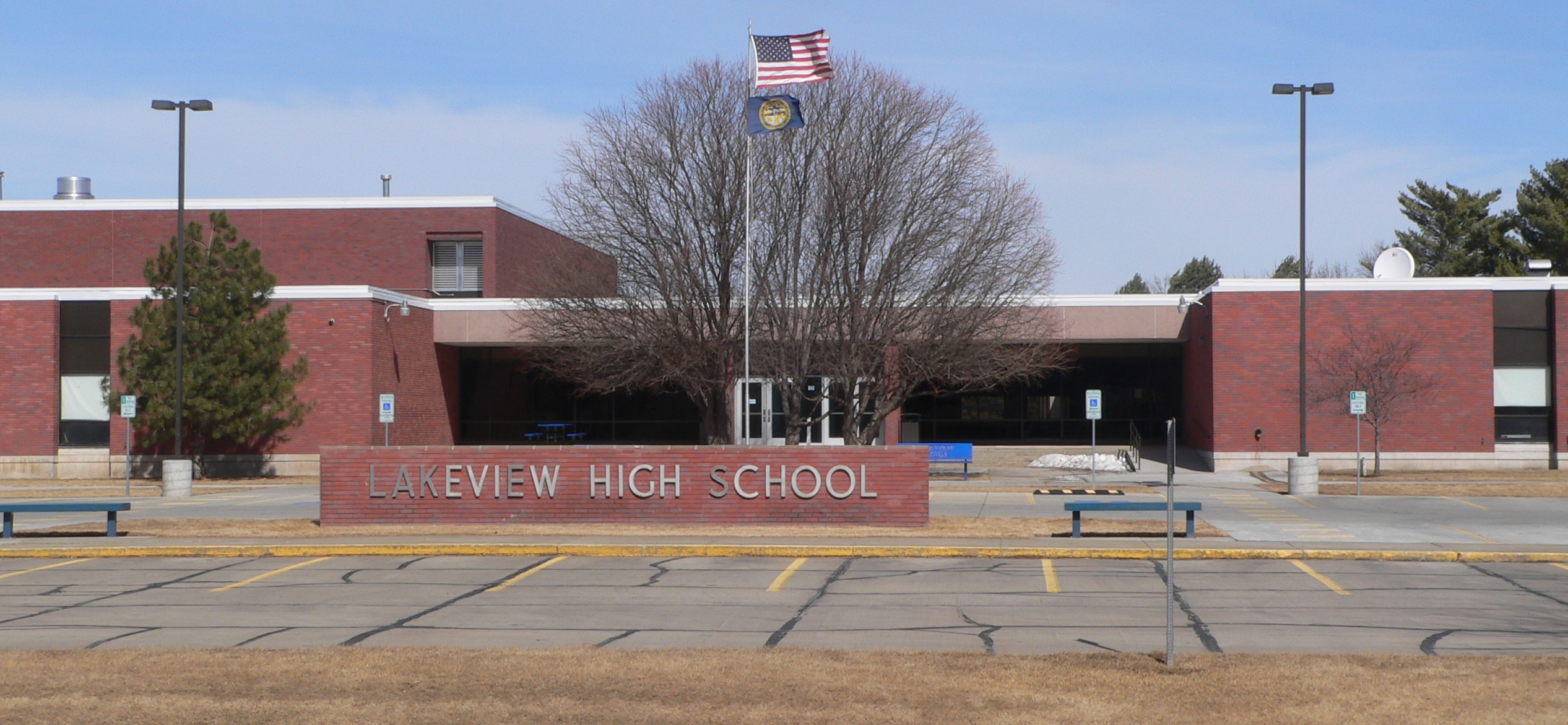

Location
- 3744 83rd Street; Columbus, Platte County, Nebraska 68601; United States

Information
- School district: Lakeview Community Schools
- Superintendent: Russ Freeman
- Principal: Steve Borer
- Teaching staff: 24.99 (on an FTE basis)
- Grades: 9–12
- Enrollment: 311 (2022–23)
- Student to teacher ratio: 12.44
- Colors: Blue and white
- Athletics conference: Central
- Mascot: Viking
- Rival: Scotus Central Catholic
- Newspaper: Viking Viewpoint
- Information: 402-564-8518
- Website: lakeview.lakeview.esu7.org

Lakeview Junior-Senior High School is a rural junior and senior high school located near Lake Babcock and Lake North in unincorporated Platte County, Nebraska, near Columbus, United States. It is a part of Lakeview Community Schools.

The Lakeview school district was formed in 1968 in response to Columbus Public Schools deciding for financial reasons to no longer admit non-resident tuition students. Lakeview High School opened in the fall of 1969 and graduated its first class in 1970. In 2009, the district moved seventh- and eighth-graders to the Lakeview High School building and added six classrooms in order to alleviate crowding at its two feeder schools, Shell Creek Elementary and Platte Center Elementary, following the closure and sale of another school, Sunrise Elementary, to Archer Daniels Midland.

== Athletics ==
The men's basketball team won the class C-1 state championship in 2001 and got runner-up in 2002.

== Notable alumni ==
- Lucas Cruikshank, creator of Fred Figglehorn
