= Loup Power District =

Public electric utility in Nebraska

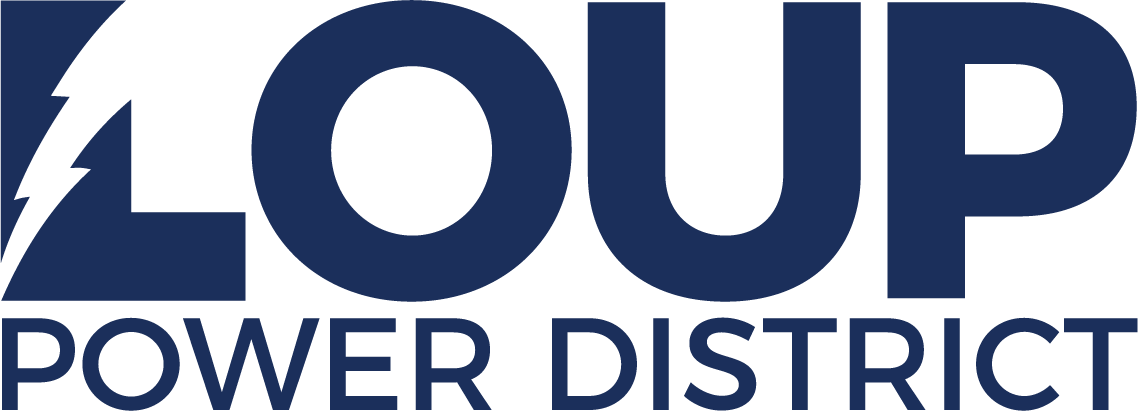
- Company type: Publicly owned
- Founded: June 1933; 92 years ago in Columbus, Nebraska
- Headquarters: 2404 15th Street, Columbus, Nebraska
- Areas served: Boone County; Colfax County; Madison County; Nance County; Platte County
- Services: Electricity
- Website: loup.com

Loup Power District (LPD) is a public electric utility in the state of Nebraska. It is wholly owned by the Nebraska state government, and controlled by a special district.

== Facilities ==
The district owns operates the 35 miles (56 km) Loup Canal, as well as the two power stations on the canal, known as the Monroe Powerhouse and the Columbus Powerhouse. The district also owns and operates five parks located along the canal.

== See also ==
- Special districts in the United States
- Energy in the United States
