= Arnold Oehlrich =

American football player (1905–1965)

- Oehlrich, c. 1927

No. 11
- Positions: Fullback, halfback

Personal information
- Born: November 24, 1905; Clarks, Nebraska, US
- Died: June 27, 1965 (aged 59); Omaha, Nebraska, US
- Listed height: 5 ft 11 in (1.80 m)
- Listed weight: 190 lb (86 kg)

Career information
- High school: Columbus (Columbus, Nebraska)
- College: Nebraska

Career history
- Frankford Yellow Jackets (1928–1929)

Career statistics
- Games: 33
- Stats at Pro Football Reference

Arnold Henry "Itch" Oehlrich (November 24, 1905 – June 27, 1965) was an American football player. He played college football as a fullback for Nebraska from 1925 to 1927. He also played professional football in the National Football League (NFL), principally as a halfback, for the Frankford Yellow Jackets in 1928 and 1929.

== Early life ==
Oehlrich was born in Clarks, Nebraska, in 1905. He attended Columbus High School in Columbus, Nebraska, where he "attained state-wide fame for his prowess in consistently lugging the pigskin for substantial gains." He also played basketball and track in high school, winning a total of 11 athletic letters in the three sports.

== Nebraska ==
Oehlrich played college football as a fullback for Nebraska from 1925 to 1927. At Nebraska, he earned a reputation as "a fine defensive back, an excellent blocker [who] made substantial gains every time he carried the ball", but "didn't score the touchdowns."

== Frankford Yellow Jackets ==
In June 1928, Oehlrich signed a contract to play 20 games of professional football in the National Football League (NFL) with the Frankford Yellow Jackets of Philadelphia. The contract called for him to be paid $100 per game; he was recruited to Frankford by fellow Nebraska alumnus and Frankford star Ed Weir. Oehlrich appeared in 16 games as a halfback for Frankford during the 1928 season, 15 as a starter, and scored two touchdowns.

After spending the off-season in Nebraska, Oehlrich returned to Frankford in September 1929 for a second season of professional football. He appeared in 17 games for Frankford in 1929, 14 as a starter, playing at halfback, fullback, and quarterback.

In all, Oehlrich appeared in 33 NFL games, 29 as a starter, and scored three touchdowns. Oehlrich later recalled the high level of play in the NFL during his playing days:

When you organize a team composed of star players from all sections of the country, you are bound to have the finest brand of football possible. And when you are in there playing, with the knowledge that you'll be benched for another gridder if you don't deliver the goods, you're sure to give your best every moment.

== Coaching and later years ==
In August 1930, Oehlrich was hired as an assistant football coach at Kearney State Teachers College—now known as University of Nebraska at Kearney—under head coach Ted James.

Oehlrich operated a dairy farm near Richland, Nebraska, from approximately 1945 until his death in 1965.
