= KTTT =

Radio station in Columbus, Nebraska

- Columbus, Nebraska; United States
- Frequency: 1510 kHz
- Branding: AM 1510 K Triple T

Programming
- Format: Classic country
- Affiliations: Westwood One

Ownership
- Owner: Connoisseur Media; (Alpha 3E Licensee, LLC)
- Sister stations: KJSK; KZEN; KKOT; KLIR

History
- First air date: December 2, 1962

Technical information
- Licensing authority: FCC
- Facility ID: 28148
- Class: D
- Power: 500 watts day
- Transmitter coordinates: 41°27′14″N 97°24′21.2″W

Links
- Public license information: Public file; LMS
- Website: www.mycentralnebraska.com/stations/k-triple-t/

KTTT (1510 AM, "AM 1510 K Triple T") was a radio station broadcasting a classic country format. Licensed to Columbus, Nebraska, United States, the station was owned by Connoisseur Media, through licensee Alpha 3E Licensee, LLC. The station signed off the air December 31, 2025, "while considering future operational plans for the station."

== History ==
KTTT first signed on the air on December 2, 1962, originally broadcasting at a power of 500 watts. The station was established by City and Farm Broadcasting, Inc., under the leadership of William Whitlock, with its first studios located at 1259 27th Avenue in Columbus. In its early years, the station adopted a "Bright Pop Music" format and was known for maintaining a mobile news unit to provide rapid on-the-scene coverage of local events, a significant technological investment for a small-market station at the time.

In the mid-1960s, the station became an early radio home for Joe Siedlik's Big Joe Polka Show, which aired on the station for four decades. The show eventually became a staple of the station's weekend programming, helping KTTT maintain a high listenership among the region's Eastern European agricultural communities and eventually leading to Siedlik becoming a nationally recognized polka historian. In its early years, KTTT established a reputation for local journalism under the direction of Ron Bogus, who served as the station’s news director after working for The Columbus Telegram. Bogus, a regional journalist, was known for his high-profile coverage and notably interviewed President John F. Kennedy during his career.

Throughout the late 20th century, KTTT underwent several ownership and format changes. In 1989, under Husker Broadcasting, the station shifted to a "Soft Adult Contemporary" format designed to target a broad 25-65 age demographic before eventually pivoting to its current "Classic Country" identity. The station operated as a Class D facility on 1510 kHz. Because 1510 AM is a clear-channel frequency, KTTT was required to significantly reduce power or cease broadcasting during nighttime hours to avoid interference with other stations.

Following a series of mergers in the 21st century, KTTT became part of a larger regional cluster that includes sister stations KJSK, KKOT, KLIR, and KZEN. Connoisseur Media acquired the station cluster as part of a multi-million dollar transaction involving more than 100 stations across the United States. Under this ownership, KTTT maintained its affiliation with Westwood One, offering nationally syndicated country programming.
