= Chad Mustard =

American football player (born 1977)

No. 83, 88, 85, 71
- Position: Tight end / Offensive guard

Personal information
- Born: October 8, 1977 (age 49); Central City, Nebraska, U.S.
- Listed height: 6 ft 6 in (1.98 m)
- Listed weight: 277 lb (126 kg)

Career information
- High school: Scotus Central Catholic (Columbus, Nebraska)
- College: North Dakota
- NFL draft: 2002: undrafted

Career history
- Omaha Beef (2002); Cleveland Browns (2002–2004); → Rhein Fire (2003); Carolina Panthers (2005)*; Denver Broncos (2006–2008)
- * Offseason or practice squad member only

Awards and highlights
- Football: NCAA Division II champion (2001); Basketball: Third-team NABC Division II All-American (2000)

Career NFL statistics
- Receptions: 12
- Receiving yards: 123
- Stats at Pro Football Reference

Chad Anthony Mustard (born October 8, 1977) is an American former professional football player who was a tight end and offensive guard in the National Football League (NFL). He played college football and basketball for the North Dakota Fighting Hawks.

Originally from Columbus, Nebraska, Mustard was an all-state basketball and football player at Scotus Central Catholic High School. At the University of North Dakota, Mustard began his college athletics career in basketball. In his senior year, Mustard earned All-American honors in a season where the North Dakota Fighting Sioux made the NCAA Division II Tournament. After his college basketball career, Mustard played at tight end for the North Dakota Fighting Sioux football team for two seasons, concluding his college football career with the 2001 NCAA Division II national championship.

Undrafted in the 2002 NFL draft, Mustard began his professional football career with the Omaha Beef of the National Indoor Football League before signing with the NFL's Cleveland Browns later in 2002. After one season with the Rhein Fire of NFL Europe, Mustard made his NFL debut with the Browns in 2003. A foot injury prematurely ended his season in 2004, after which the Browns cut him in early 2005. After being signed with the Carolina Panthers in the 2005 preseason, Mustard played for the Denver Broncos from 2006 to 2008 before retiring from football. Since then, Mustard returned to Nebraska to work as a high school teacher, basketball coach, and real estate agent.

== Early life and college career ==
Born in Central City, Nebraska, and raised in Columbus, Nebraska, Mustard graduated from Scotus Central Catholic High School in Columbus in 1996. Mustard was a football, basketball, and track student-athlete in high school. Mustard earned all-state football honors in his junior and senior years and all-state basketball honors as a senior.

At the University of North Dakota, Mustard enrolled on a basketball scholarship and played at forward and center on the North Dakota Fighting Sioux men's basketball team from 1996 to 2000 under head coach Rich Glas. He finished his basketball career eighth on North Dakota's all-time leading scoring list with 1,568 points and averaged 14.0 points and 6.6 rebounds in 112 games. By his junior year, Mustard built a reputation among opposing fans for his loud, emotional expressions during play such as yelling and pumping fists, to the point that Glas took him off the starting lineup. As a senior in 1999–2000, Mustard was part of a team that made the NCAA Division II Tournament and made the NABC All-American third-team. On March 9, 2000, Mustard scored 23 points and 10 rebounds in a 73–67 win over South Dakota State, ending North Dakota's eight-game losing streak in the series.

After his basketball career, in 2000 and 2001, Mustard played at tight end on the North Dakota Fighting Sioux football team. Mustard had eight receptions for 146 yards and a touchdown in 2000. Then in 2001, Mustard helped North Dakota win the 2001 NCAA Division II national championship. Mustard graduated from North Dakota with a B.S. in math education.

== Pro football career ==
After going undrafted in the 2002 NFL draft, Mustard was signed by the Omaha Beef of the National Indoor Football League as a free agent. Mustard started 13 games for the Beef, 10 at wide receiver and three at guard.

On December 3, 2002, Mustard signed with the Cleveland Browns practice squad, then signed a futures contract with the Browns on January 8, 2003. During the spring of 2003, Mustard played for the Rhein Fire of NFL Europe, where he caught 16 passes for 167 yards and one touchdown.

Following the 2003 preseason, Mustard was waived by the Browns on August 31 but was re-signed to the practice squad on October 1 and promoted to the active roster October 11. Mustard made his NFL debut the next day, coming off the bench in a 13–7 win over the Oakland Raiders. He then played on special teams in the next two games before being waived on November 4 and re-signed to the practice squad November 6. A week later, the Browns re-signed Mustard to the active roster to fill in for the injured Steve Heiden. On November 16, Mustard made his first NFL career reception, a five-yard first down catch during a field goal scoring drive. Playing primarily as a blocking tight end, Mustard concluded the 2003 season with 10 games played, four receptions for 29 yards, and a six-yard kickoff return. In a 2008 interview, Mustard recalled his ever-changing employment status in Cleveland: "My career was so iffy, I lived in a hotel there for almost two years."

Due to a right shoulder injury from the 2003 season finale, Mustard spent much of the 2004 offseason recovering from the injury. In 2004, Mustard played in seven games off the bench, with one reception for nine yards and two kickoff returns for 13 yards. Mustard had a season-ending left foot injury in the November 14 game vs. the Pittsburgh Steelers. On February 22, 2005, the Browns released Mustard. On August 11, 2005, Mustard signed with the Carolina Panthers, and he was cut after the preseason on August 29.

On January 3, 2006, Mustard signed a futures contract with the Denver Broncos. In 2006, Mustard played in 12 games with four starts, with two receptions for 23 yards and one kickoff return for two yards. Playing in 12 games with two starts, Mustard had a career high 62 receiving yards on five catches in 2007. In 2008, his final pro football season, Mustard played in eight games off the bench, his only statistic being a 17-yard kickoff return.

== Post-football career ==
After retiring from football, Mustard became a high school basketball coach, teacher, and realtor in the Omaha, Nebraska area. From 2009 to 2011, Mustard was a varsity assistant and junior varsity head coach for boys' basketball at Bellevue West High School in Bellevue, Nebraska. Then from 2011 to 2014, he had the same positions at Millard West High School in Omaha. Since 2014, Mustard has been a math teacher and varsity boys' basketball head coach at Bellevue East High School in Bellevue.

Having begun investing in real estate in 2007, Mustard obtained his real estate license in 2014 and joined Liberty Core Real Estate in Omaha.

== Personal life ==
Mustard's father Don worked as a truck driver. Mustard says that his family "didn't have a lot of money" when he was growing up. In 2005, Mustard married Kalli Morfeld. They live in Omaha, Nebraska with their two children.
