= KLIR =

Radio station in Columbus, Nebraska

- Columbus, Nebraska; United States
- Frequency: 101.1 MHz
- Branding: KLIR 101

Programming
- Format: Adult contemporary

Ownership
- Owner: Connoisseur Media; (Alpha 3E License, LLC)
- Sister stations: KJSK; KZEN; KKOT; KTTT

History
- First air date: August 1964 (as KJSK-FM)
- Former call signs: KJSK-FM (1964–1977); KOXI (1977–1984)
- Call sign meaning: "Clear"

Technical information
- Licensing authority: FCC
- Facility ID: 26627
- Class: C1
- ERP: 100,000 watts
- HAAT: 232 meters (761 feet)
- Transmitter coordinates: 41°16′54.4″N 97°24′32.4″W

Links
- Public license information: Public file; LMS
- Webcast: Listen live
- Website: www.mycentralnebraska.com/stations/klir-101/

KLIR (101.1 FM, "Clear 101") is a radio station licensed to serve Columbus, Nebraska, United States. The station is owned by Connoisseur Media, through licensee Alpha 3E License, LLC. KLIR broadcasts an adult contemporary music format.

== History ==
The station was founded in 1964 as KJSK-FM, sister station to KJSK AM. In 1977 the call letters were changed to KOXI, broadcasting an easy listening format. In early 1984, the new general manager and soon-to-be part owner, Stan Tafoya, negotiated a deal to bring the new call letters KLIR, or "Clear" from a station in Denver. The Columbus station was granted the new call sign by the Federal Communications Commission on July 9, 1984. The decision to change the call letters coincided with a format change to an adult contemporary format, or "Soft Rock, with Less Talk".

Under the Tafoya's leadership, the "Clear" sound was created for the community of Columbus and surrounding areas. "Clear" positioned itself as "The Radio Station Columbus Built", and became very successful in both ratings and revenue, still retaining many of the same programming elements today. For years, KLIR has been the most listened to radio station in the Platte County, according to Arbitron.

Chuck Lontine was one of the first talents hired by Tafoya, but left within the first year of the new KLIR to become a sales executive with CBS Radio in San Francisco. Tafoya then searched the Midwest for new voices, recruiting Steve Kohl from the Denver market. Kohl took the on-air name of "Scott Fisher" and helped guide the station to even greater success. A strong on-air team soon developed with Fisher in the morning and Jon Michaels in the afternoon. The credible news voice of James Nickel also contributed to the "Clear" sound. Top salesman Verl Wurtz added his play-by-play talents to the station's popular local sports programming.

Tafoya left in the mid-1990s after a subsequent sale of the station to new owners. Many local business people and listeners have long cited the operation under Tafoya as a classic marketing success story, where a relatively small and unknown radio station transforms itself into the market leader.
