= Mark Streimer =

American politician

Member-elect of the Minnesota House of Representatives from the 10A district
- Assuming office January 12, 2027
- Succeeding: Ron Kresha

Personal details
- Party: Republican
- Website: www.striemerforhouse.com

Mark Streimer is an American politician who is the representative-elect for district 10A in the Minnesota House of Representatives. A member of the Minnesota Republican Party, he was elected in 2026. District 10A covers parts of Aitkin, Crow Wing, Kanabec, Mille Lacs, and Morrison Counties.
