= Clarks, Nebraska =

- Village
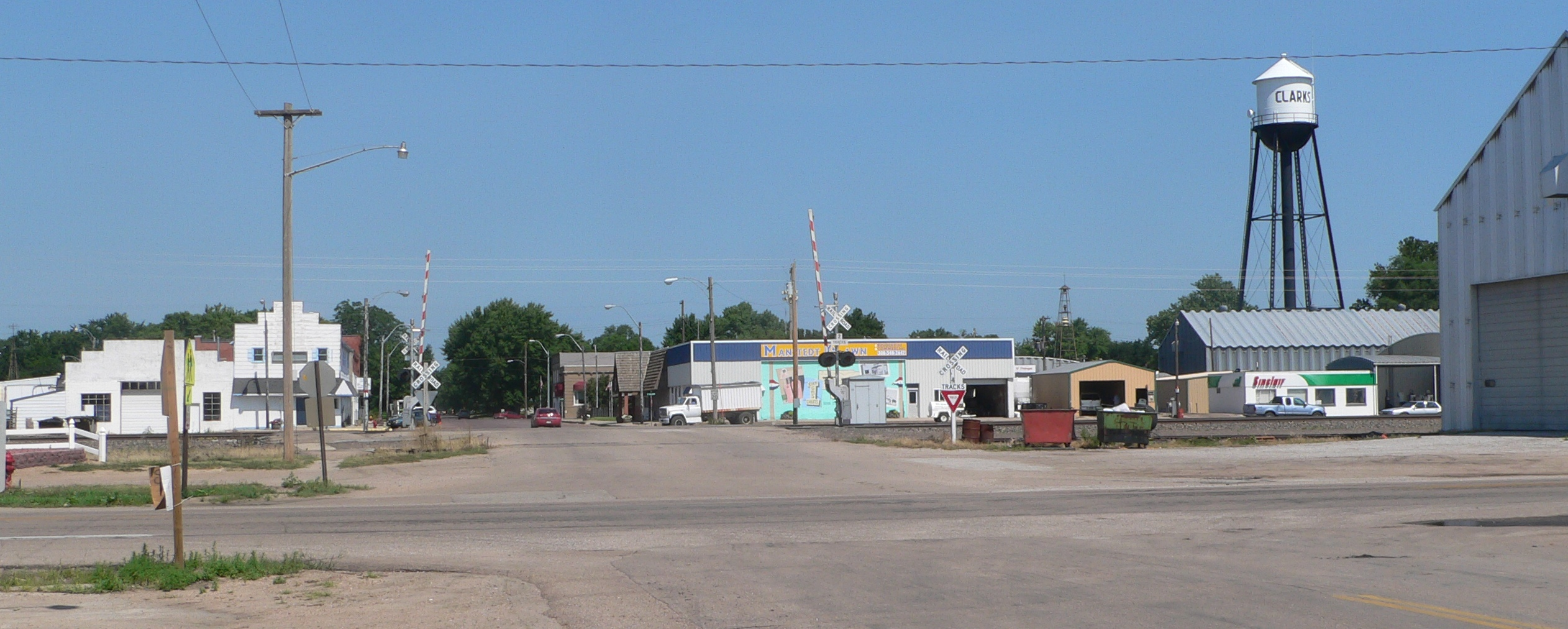
- Downtown Clarks: Green Street, seen from across U.S. Highway 30

- Location in Merrick County and the state of Nebraska
- Coordinates: 41°12′59″N 97°50′22″W
- Country: United States
- State: Nebraska
- County: Merrick

Area
  - Total: 0.31 sq mi (0.81 km^{2})
  - Land: 0.31 sq mi (0.81 km^{2})
  - Water: 0 sq mi (0.00 km^{2})
- Elevation: 1,621 ft (494 m)

Population (2020)
  - Total: 344
  - Density: 1,096.2/sq mi (423.24/km^{2})
- Time zone: UTC-6 (Central (CST))
  - Summer (DST): UTC-5 (CDT)
- ZIP code: 68628
- Area code: 308
- FIPS code: 31-09165
- GNIS feature ID: 2397631
- Website: villageofclarks.com

Clarks is a village in Merrick County, Nebraska, United States. The population was 344 at the 2020 census. It is part of the Grand Island, Nebraska Micropolitan Statistical Area.

== History ==
Clarks was platted in 1866 when the Union Pacific Railroad was extended to that point. It is named for Silas Henry H. Clark, superintendent of the Union Pacific Railroad.

== Geography ==
Clarks is in northeastern Merrick County, mostly on the northwest side of U.S. Route 30, which leads southwest 11 miles (18 km) to Central City, the county seat, and northeast the same distance to Silver Creek. According to the U.S. Census Bureau, the village of Clarks has a total area of 0.31 square miles (0.80 km^{2}), all land. The Platte River flows by less than 2 miles (3 km) southeast of the village.

== Demographics ==
Historical population
Census	Pop.	Note	%±
1900	554		—
1910	605		9.2%
1920	540		−10.7%
1930	540		0.0%
1940	454		−15.9%
1950	464		2.2%
1960	439		−5.4%
1970	480		9.3%
1980	445		−7.3%
1990	379		−14.8%
2000	361		−4.7%
2010	369		2.2%
2020	344		−6.8%
U.S. Decennial Census

=== 2010 census ===
At the 2010 census there were 369 people, 145 households, and 105 families in the village. The population density was 1,190.3 inhabitants per square mile (459.6/km^{2}). There were 167 housing units at an average density of 538.7 per square mile (208.0/km^{2}). The racial makup of the village was 94.9% White, 0.3% Native American, 0.8% Asian, 1.6% from other races, and 2.4% from two or more races. Hispanic or Latino of any race were 4.1%.

Of the 145 households 37.9% had children under the age of 18 living with them, 60.7% were married couples living together, 6.2% had a female householder with no husband present, 5.5% had a male householder with no wife present, and 27.6% were non-families. 23.4% of households were one person and 12.4% were one person aged 65 or older. The average household size was 2.54 and the average family size was 3.03.

The median age in the village was 39.2 years. 28.5% of residents were under the age of 18; 5.4% were between the ages of 18 and 24; 22.2% were from 25 to 44; 28.1% were from 45 to 64; and 15.7% were 65 or older. The gender makeup of the village was 47.2% male and 52.8% female.

=== 2000 census ===
At the 2000 census there were 361 people, 157 households, and 102 families in the village. The population density was 1,164.3 inhabitants per square mile (449.5/km^{2}). There were 179 housing units at an average density of 577.3 per square mile (222.9/km^{2}). The racial makup of the village was 98.06% White, 0.83% from other races, and 1.11% from two or more races. Hispanic or Latino of any race were 2.22%.

Of the 157 households 26.8% had children under the age of 18 living with them, 59.2% were married couples living together, 3.8% had a female householder with no husband present, and 34.4% were non-families. 31.8% of households were one person and 21.0% were one person aged 65 or older. The average household size was 2.30 and the average family size was 2.88.

The age distribution was 23.3% under the age of 18, 5.3% from 18 to 24, 25.5% from 25 to 44, 23.5% from 45 to 64, and 22.4% 65 or older. The median age was 42 years. For every 100 females, there were 81.4 males. For every 100 females age 18 and over, there were 87.2 males.

As of 2000 the median income for a household in the village was $29,583, and the median family income was $40,625. Males had a median income of $26,875 versus $25,313 for females. The per capita income for the village was $15,742. About 12.8% of families and 16.7% of the population were below the poverty line, including 25.9% of those under age 18 and 16.3% of those age 65 or over.

== Education ==
Clarks Public School was a K-12 school until it consolidated with the Polk, Hordville, and Marquette school systems in 2000.

== Notable people ==
- Arnold Oehlrich, football player
- Evan Williams, co-founder of Twitter
