= KTLX =

Coordinates: 41°26′26″N 97°21′14″W

- Columbus, Nebraska; United States
- Frequency: 91.3 MHz

Programming
- Format: Christian Radio
- Affiliations: VCY America; Moody Radio

Ownership
- Owner: TLC Educational Corporation

History
- First air date: July 1974
- Former frequencies: 91.9 (1974–2013)

Technical information
- Licensing authority: FCC
- Facility ID: 67200
- Class: A
- ERP: 250 watts
- HAAT: 10 meters (33 ft)

Links
- Public license information: Public file; LMS
- Website: http://www.ktlx.org/

KTLX (91.3 FM) is a Christian radio station licensed to Columbus, Nebraska. The station is owned by TLC Educational Corporation.

== History ==
KTLX first signed on the air in July 1974 as a non-commercial educational (NCE) station. Originally broadcasting at 91.9 MHz, the station was established to provide a dedicated Christian radio voice for the Platte County region. From its inception, the station has been owned and operated by the TLC Educational Corporation, a local non-profit organization dedicated to religious and educational broadcasting. In 2011, the station sought to improve its coverage and signal clarity within the Columbus city limits. The Federal Communications Commission (FCC) granted a construction permit on October 12, 2011, allowing KTLX to move from its original 91.9 MHz frequency to its current home at 91.3 MHz. As part of this transition, the station increased its Effective Radiated Power (ERP) from 100 watts to 250 watts, ensuring a more robust signal for its listeners. The FCC officially issued the license to cover these changes on June 18, 2013.

KTLX operates as a Christian radio station, offering a blend of Contemporary Christian music, worship, and instructional teaching programs. The station utilizes programming from major national networks, including Moody Radio and VCY America. KTLX relies primarily on listener support and charitable contributions rather than traditional advertising to sustain its operations.

The station also maintains strong ties with local religious institutions; for example, St. Luke's in Columbus utilizes KTLX to broadcast a weekly message every Sunday at noon for residents who cannot attend services in person. Other notable programming includes segments from The Public Square, which airs on KTLX every Sunday at 2:00 PM, providing a platform for faith-based discussion on current events.
