= KKOT =

Radio station in Columbus, Nebraska

- Columbus, Nebraska; United States
- Broadcast area: Columbus, Nebraska; Norfolk, Nebraska
- Frequency: 93.5 MHz
- Branding: 93.5 The Hawk

Programming
- Format: Classic hits

Ownership
- Owner: Connoisseur Media; (Alpha 3E License, LLC)
- Sister stations: KJSK; KZEN; KLIR; KTTT

History
- First air date: 1969
- Call sign meaning: reference to former "Coyote Country" branding

Technical information
- Licensing authority: FCC
- Facility ID: 28149
- Class: C1
- ERP: 100,000 watts
- HAAT: 299 meters (981 ft)
- Transmitter coordinates: 41°32′28″N 97°40′46.2″W

Links
- Public license information: Public file; LMS
- Webcast: Listen live
- Website: www.mycentralnebraska.com

KKOT (93.5 FM) is a radio station licensed to Columbus, Nebraska, United States. The station airs a classic hits format and is owned by Connoisseur Media through licensee Alpha 3E License, LLC.

The station that would become KKOT was originally established in 1969 as KTTT, serving as the frequency-modulation sister to KTTT (AM). At its launch, the station operated with 3,000 watts of power and initially duplicated the AM station's "Middle of the Road" and agricultural programming for half of its broadcast day. By 1975, KTTT-FM began to establish its own identity by adopting a high-energy Top 40 format specifically during the evening hours after the AM station was required to sign off at sunset.

In 1985, the station was sold to Columbus Broadcasting Systems, leading to a call sign change to KWMG. This era was short-lived, as the station underwent a transformation in October 1993, rebranding as KKOT and adopting the "Coyote Country" moniker. This change was accompanied by a technical upgrade; the station moved to a Class C1 status and increased its Effective Radiated Power (ERP) to 100,000 watts. This allowed the station to broadcast from an antenna height of nearly 1,000 feet, effectively covering the entire region between Columbus and Norfolk, Nebraska.

After over a decade as a country music powerhouse, the station pivoted its musical direction to a Classic Hits format, rebranding as "93.5 The Hawk." In addition to its musical offerings, KKOT is a vital part of the regional sports network, serving as a primary affiliate for the Husker Radio Network and providing live coverage of University of Nebraska athletics. In late 2025, the station's long-term ownership under Alpha Media came to an end as it was acquired by Connoisseur Media in a multi-market merger that established Connoisseur as a top-ten radio broadcaster in the United States.
