= KZEN =

Radio station in Central City, Nebraska

- Central City, Nebraska; United States
- Broadcast area: Columbus, Grand Island
- Frequency: 100.3 MHz
- Branding: KZ 100

Programming
- Format: Country music
- Affiliations: ABC News Radio

Ownership
- Owner: Connoisseur Media; (Alpha 3E License, LLC)
- Sister stations: KJSK; KKOT; KLIR; KTTT

History
- First air date: 1985

Technical information
- Licensing authority: FCC
- Facility ID: 50733
- Class: C
- ERP: 100,000 watts
- HAAT: 562 meters (1,844 ft)
- Transmitter coordinates: 41°32′28″N 97°40′26.2″W

Links
- Public license information: Public file; LMS
- Webcast: www.alphamediaplayer.com/kz100
- Website: Listen live

KZEN (100.3 FM) is a radio station broadcasting a country music format. Licensed to Central City, Nebraska, United States, the station serves the Columbus and Grand Island areas. The station is owned by Connoisseur Media, through licensee Alpha 3E License, LLC, and features programming from ABC News Radio.

KZEN first signed on the air in 1985 as a high-powered FM signal designed to bridge the gap between several central Nebraska markets. It was famously promoted in early trade publications as a "super radio station" due to its massive 100,000-watt signal and a transmitter tower standing over 1,800 feet tall. This technical setup allowed the station to cover a significantly larger geographical area than standard regional stations, reaching listeners from the edge of Omaha to the western reaches of the Tri-Cities (Grand Island, Kearney, and Hastings).

In 2008, KZEN was named a finalist for the National Association of Broadcasters (NAB) Crystal Radio Award, an honor reserved for stations demonstrating extraordinary year-round community service. Farm broadcaster Susan Littlefield was recognized as a finalist for the prestigious Marconi Radio Award for Small Market Personality of the Year in 2013, highlighting the station's standard for agricultural news delivery.

KZEN has historically operated as part of a cluster alongside sister stations KLIR, KJSK, and KTTT. For many years, these stations were owned by Three Eagles Communications before being sold to Digity in 2014, and subsequently to Alpha Media in 2016 as part of a major industry consolidation. Most recently, the station joined Connoisseur Media in 2025 following a merger with Alpha Media’s regional holdings. Today, KZEN airs programming from ABC News Radio and participates in local community events.
