= Columbus High School (Nebraska) =

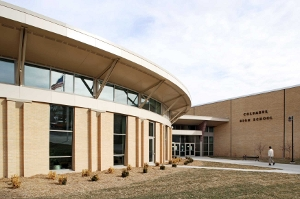
- Main entrance

Location
- 3434 Discoverer Drive; Columbus, Nebraska 68601; United States
- Coordinates: 41°26′30″N 97°21′17″W

Information
- Other name: CHS
- Type: Public high school
- School district: Columbus Public Schools
- NCES School ID: 310534000168
- Principal: David Hiebner
- Teaching staff: 76.57 (on an FTE basis)
- Grades: 9–12
- Enrollment: 1,295 (2023-2024)
- Student to teacher ratio: 16.91
- Colors: Maroon and white
- Mascot: Discoverers
- Newspaper: The Discoverer
- Yearbook: The Voyage
- Website: www.columbuspublicschools.org

Columbus High School (CHS) is a public high school in Columbus, Nebraska, United States. It is part of the Columbus Public Schools district.

== History ==
=== 1883–1899 ===
The first high school in Columbus came in 1883. The Williams High School was opened as the result of a $12,000 bond issue.

=== 1899–1925 ===
Columbus quickly outgrew Williams High. A new facility was built in 1898 for approximately $24,000. The building was called one of the "finest public schools to date" in Nebraska. An addition was added in 1904, and it was used as the high school until 1925 when it became Columbus Junior High School. The building was demolished in the late 1950s.

=== 1925–1958 ===
Kramer High School was built just west of the previous high school due to the extreme demand for more educational space. Officially dedicated in December 1925, Kramer High was named in honor of long-time school board president Carl Kramer, who had died in 1924. Additions came in 1951, 1961, 1965, and 1990. Kramer High served Columbus through 1958 when it became Columbus Junior High School and then Columbus Middle School in 1986.

=== 1958–2017 ===
A new Columbus High School opened in 1958. Constructed for around $1,500,000, the new Columbus High proved to be a much-needed way of modernizing Columbus. Columbus High was added onto in 1965, 1976, and 1988. A $17.6 million bond issue was passed in 2003 to renovate the high school. The renovation, which was completed in 2007, added several classrooms and an expansive media center. This building was later turned into Columbus Middle School following the 2017–18 school year after the high school moved into its new facility.

=== 2017–present ===
A new high school was constructed in 2017 with a bond that was approved in 2015. The new building has a state of the art STEM facility and many other things.

== Athletics ==
Columbus High School is a member of the Nebraska School Activities Association and competes in the Heartland Athletic Conference. The school mascot is the Discoverer.]

State championships
Season	Sport	Number of championships	Year
Fall	Football	1	1964
Fall	Cross country, boys	0	
Fall	Cross country, girls	0	
Fall	Volleyball	0	
Fall	Softball	0	
Fall	Golf, girls	0	
Fall	Tennis, boys	0	
Fall	Unified bowling	2	2022, 2024
Winter	Basketball, boys	3	1926, 1933, 1972
Winter	Basketball, girls	0	
Winter	Swimming & diving, boys	0	
Winter	Swimming & diving, girls	0	
Winter	Wrestling, boys	7	1974, 1975, 1979, 1980, 1981, 1982, 1984
Winter	Wrestling, girls	0	
Winter	Bowling, boys	2	2024, 2025
Winter	Bowling, girls	0	
Spring	Baseball	0	
Spring	Soccer, boys	0	
Spring	Soccer, girls	0	
Spring	Track & field, boys	0	
Spring	Track & field, girls	0	
Spring	Golf, boys	0	
Spring	Tennis, girls	2	1989, 1993
Total		16	

== Notable alumni ==
- Ernest Hausmann, college football player
- Arnold Oehlrich, NFL player
- Cory Schlesinger, NFL player
- Evan Williams, computer programmer and Internet entrepreneur
