= KJSK =

Radio station in Columbus, Nebraska

- Columbus, Nebraska; United States
- Frequency: 900 kHz

Programming
- Format: News/talk
- Affiliations: CBS News Radio; Salem Radio Network; SportsMap

Ownership
- Owner: Connoisseur Media; (Alpha 3E License, LLC)
- Sister stations: KZEN; KKOT; KLIR; KTTT

History
- First air date: April 28, 1948
- Call sign meaning: "Know Jesus Saves and Keeps"

Technical information
- Licensing authority: FCC
- Facility ID: 26628
- Class: D
- Power: 1,000 watts day; 65 watts night
- Transmitter coordinates: 41°26′23″N 97°23′26.2″W

Links
- Public license information: Public file; LMS
- Website: www.mycentralnebraska.com/stations/newstalk-900/

KJSK (900 AM) is a radio station broadcasting a news/talk format. Licensed to Columbus, Nebraska, United States, the station is currently owned by Connoisseur Media through licensee Alpha 3E License, LLC, and features programming from CBS News Radio, Salem Radio Network and SportsMap.

The station also features religious and secular talk radio programs such as James Dobson, Woodrow Kroll, Chuck Swindoll and Michael Medved.

== History ==
George Basil Anderson applied on January 19, 1947, for a new radio station at 900 kHz in Columbus, to operate with 1,000 watts during the day. The Federal Communications Commission approved the application on September 19, 1947, and KJSK signed on April 28, 1948. Among the features on KJSK in its early years was a cooking program hosted by Anderson's wife Florence from her kitchen.

The station was noted for its Christian programming. Its flagship offering, The Glorious Gospel Hour, had aired on another Nebraska station for five years prior to the launch of KJSK; it remained on the schedule for 30 years. Basil Anderson would expand his radio holdings to a full station group, known as the Heart of the Nation Stations. In 1964, KJSK-FM 101.1 joined KJSK, offering a second outlet; as with several other Heart of the Nation operations, in 1977, the FM changed to beautiful music as KOXI before a 1984 flip to adult contemporary as KLIR. An FM station had been provided for in the construction of KJSK's tower in 1947. Alongside the religious programming that served as KJSK's mainstay, the station was known for airing polka music programming.

In 1992, Heartland Broadcasting acquired KJSK and KLIR from the Anderson family for $850,000. Under Heartland, in 1994, KJSK shifted from a religious format to a news/talk station, retaining 20 hours a week of religious programming. It also continued to broadcast polka music, with the second-most air time devoted to polka of any station in the United States in 1999. In 2001, the two stations were sold to Three Eagles Communications, which paid $2.7 million.

Digity acquired Three Eagles Communications as part of a 48-station, $66.5 million transaction in 2014. In turn, Digity was acquired by Alpha Media in a $264 million purchase that closed in 2016. Alpha Media merged with Connoisseur Media on September 4, 2025.
