= Glur's Tavern =

- U.S. National Register of Historic Places
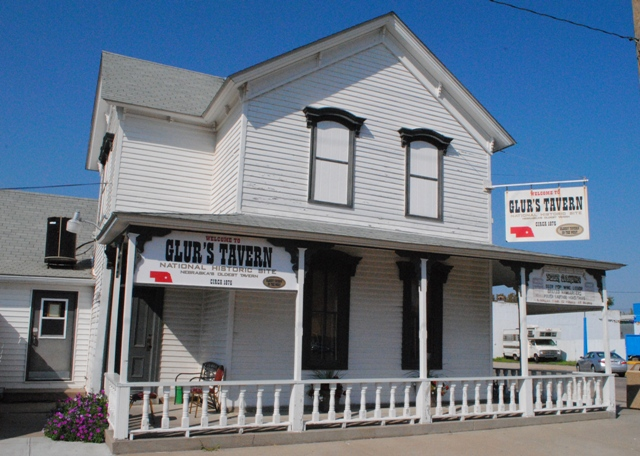
- Glur's Tavern, Columbus, Nebraska

- Location within Nebraska Location within the United States
- Location: 2301 11th St, Columbus, NE 68601 USA
- Nearest city: Columbus, Nebraska
- Coordinates: 41°25′41″N 97°21′22″W
- Built: 1876
- NRHP reference No.: 75001100
- Added to NRHP: July 30, 1975

Glur's Tavern is a drinking establishment built in 1876 in the city of Columbus, in the state of Nebraska in the Midwestern United States. It is said to be the 2nd oldest continuously operated tavern west of the Mississippi, after the Gold Pan Saloon in Breckenridge, CO (1861). It was patronized by "Buffalo Bill" Cody during a visit to Columbus. The tavern is listed in the National Register of Historic Places.

"The tavern is a worn, white clapboard structure that looks untouched by time and remodeling experts," wrote Tim Carman in the Washington City Paper. "There's even an old "SALOON" sign hanging over the front-porch entrance."

Local legend says that Buffalo Bill paid his bill at Glur's Tavern in May 1883 with a $1,000 bill after a funeral in Columbus for Major Frank North. North was the former leader of the Pawnee Indian Scouts and a close friend of Buffalo Bill's who managed the Native American participants in Buffalo Bill's Wild West show. The showman's entourage came to Columbus for the funeral and rehearsals at the local fairgrounds.
