= Lakeview Community Schools =

School district in Nebraska, United States

Lakeview Community Schools is a school district headquartered in unincorporated Platte County, Nebraska, near Columbus.

== Schools ==
- Lakeview Junior-Senior High School
- Platte Center School
- Shell Creek School
