= Loup Canal =

Canal in Nebraska

Coordinates: 41°29′42″N 97°29′18″W

The Loup Canal is a hydroelectric and irrigation canal located in eastern Nebraska, United States. The canal is owned and managed by Loup Power District, a public power electric utility.

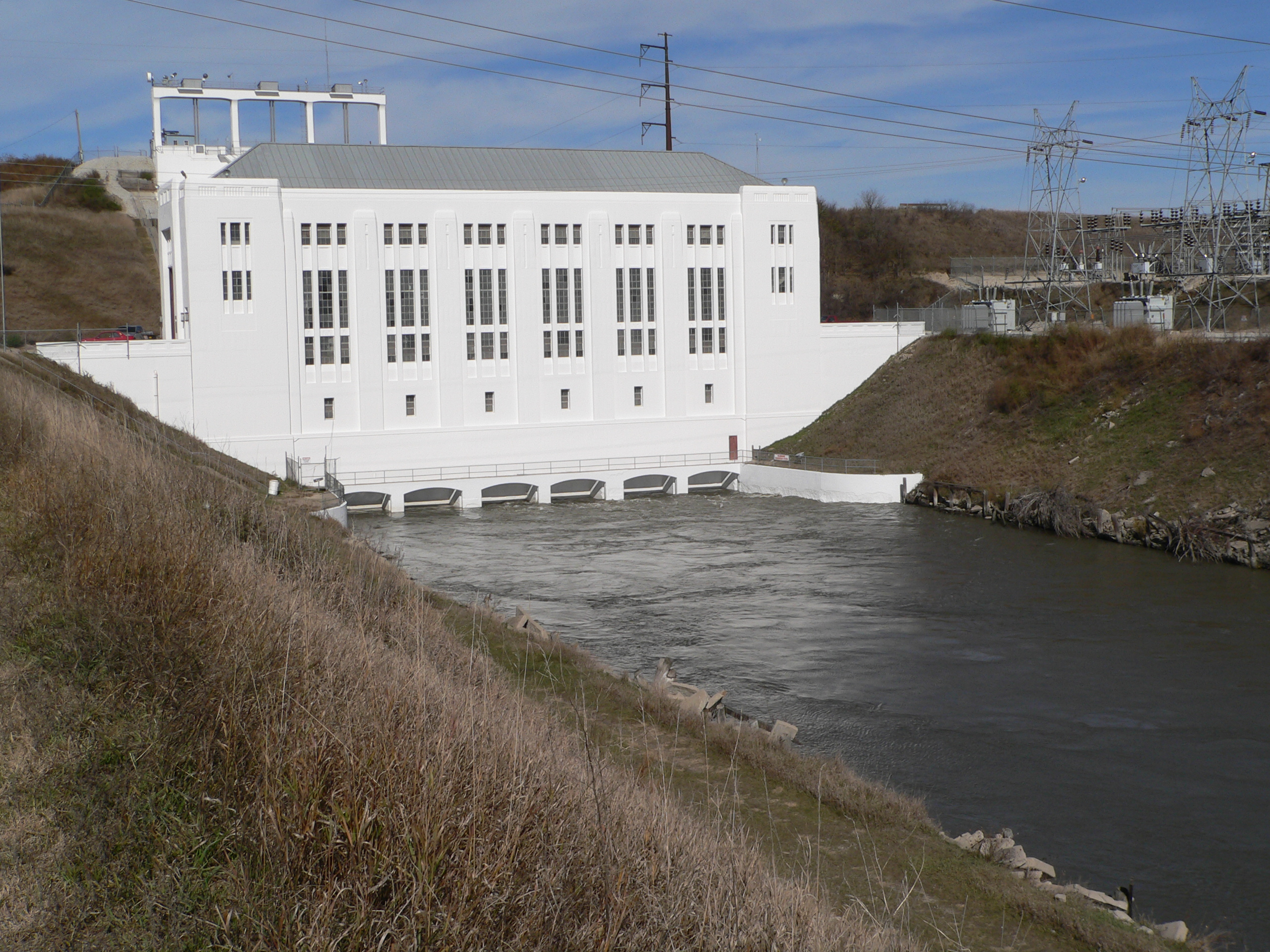
Hydroelectric plant and tailrace canal in Columbus

The canal is 35 miles (56 km) long. It begins at headworks on the Loup River in Nance County, between Fullerton and Genoa. It passes through a hydroelectric plant near Monroe with a generating capacity of 8,000 kilowatts. From there, it continues to two regulating reservoirs, Lake Babcock and Lake North, north of Columbus. The canal then runs from Lake North to a second hydroelectric plant near Columbus with a generating capacity of 40,000 kW. It ends at the Platte River in eastern Platte County about one mile below the confluence of the Platte and the Loup.

In 1933, an African American architect named Archie Alexander (1888-1958) was hired to design Loup River Power Plant. Renowned as a bridge and road builder across the country, Alexander is thought to be the first Black architect to design a civic structure in the Nebraska. Construction of the canal system began in August 1934; power generation began in March 1937.

A recreation system of parks, lakes and trails extends along the canal; these facilities are owned and operated by Loup Power District.
