= Columbus Public Schools (Nebraska) =

School district in Nebraska, US

Columbus Public Schools is a school district headquartered in Columbus, Nebraska.

== Schools ==
Secondary:

- Columbus High School
- Columbus Middle School

Primary:

- Centennial Elementary School
- Emerson Elementary School
- Lost Creek Elementary School
- North Park Elementary School
- West Park Elementary School

Preschool:

- Early Childhood

Other:

- EL Program
