= Columbus Telegram =

Newspaper published in Columbus, Nebraska

The Columbus Telegram

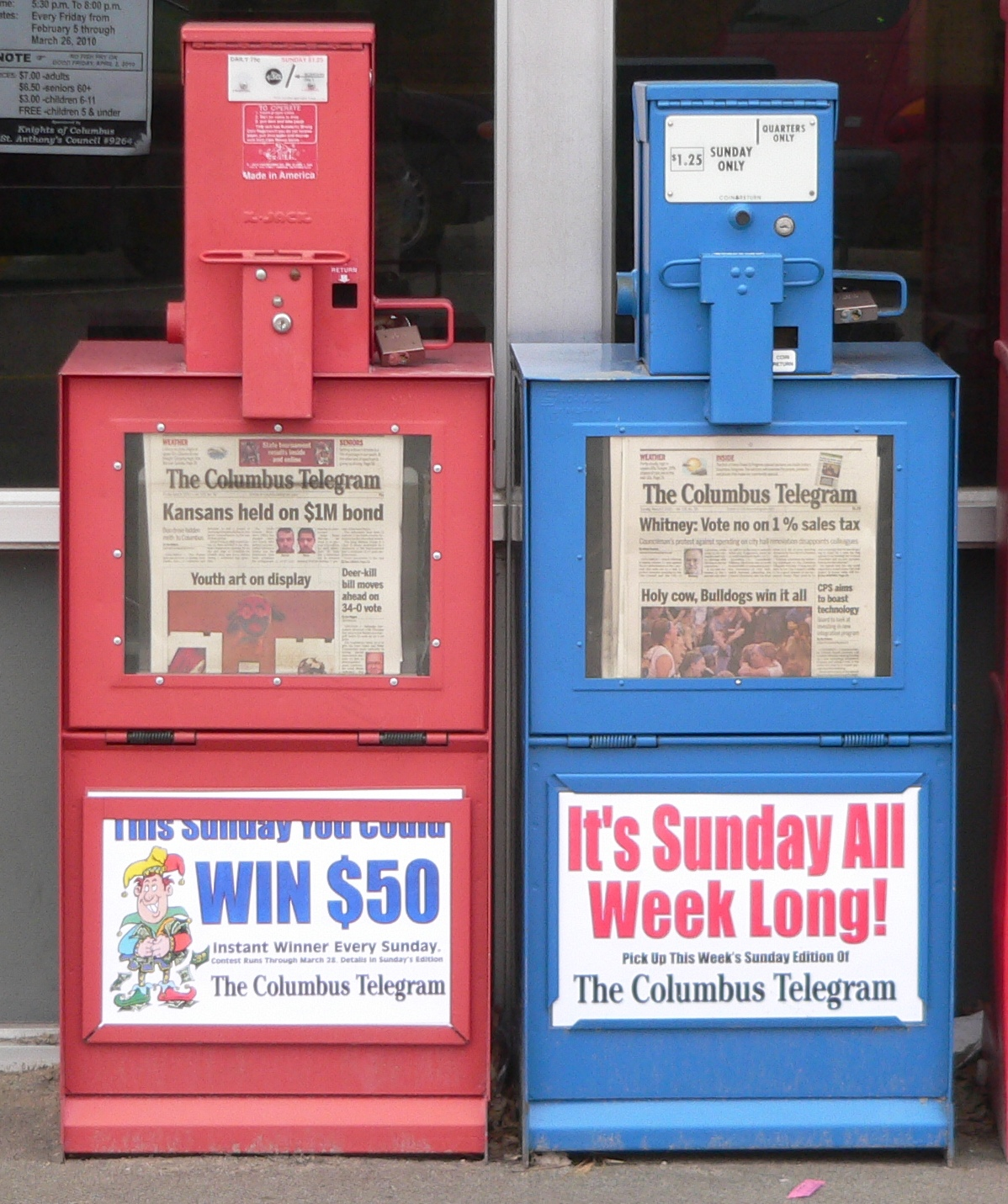
- Columbus Telegram vending machines
- Type: Daily newspaper
- Format: Broadsheet
- Owner: Lee Enterprises
- Founder: W. N. Hensley
- Publisher: Carrie Colburn
- Editor: Monica Garcia
- Founded: February 28, 1874, as the Columbus Era
- Language: English
- Headquarters: 1254 27th Avenue; Columbus, Nebraska 68601; United States
- Circulation: 3,068 Daily (as of 2023)
- OCLC number: 1002004395
- Website: columbustelegram.com

The Columbus Telegram is a newspaper owned by Lee Enterprises and published in Columbus, in the east-central part of the state of Nebraska in the Midwestern United States. It is delivered on Tuesday through Friday afternoon and on Saturday morning.

== History ==
=== 19th century ===
On February 28, 1874, W. N. Hensley founded the Columbus Era. At that time, Columbus had two newspapers, the Journal and the Republican, both Republican in policy. Hensley, a young lawyer, was working for Dr. George Miller, publisher of the Omaha Herald and a leader in the Democratic Party, who advised him to start a Democratic newspaper in Columbus.

The Era briefly ceased publication in November 1880; on April 9, 1881, it reappeared as the Columbus Democrat, managed by A. B. Coffroth and J. K. Coffroth. In 1892, the name was changed to the Telegram. In the early 1890s, D. Frank Davis attempted to publish the newspaper as a daily; however, Columbus was not large enough to support this, and the paper resumed weekly publication.

=== Edgar Howard ===
In 1900, Edgar Howard bought the Telegram from J. L. Paschal, who had been elected state senator. A lawyer and newspaperman, Howard was a strong Democrat. In 1883, he had purchased the Papillion Times in Papillion, Nebraska; in 1887, he had left the Times to go to Benkelman in southwestern Nebraska, where he founded the Dundy Democrat. In 1890, he had returned to Papillion and bought back the Times. He had served a few months as William Jennings Bryan's private secretary in 1891; in 1894, he was elected to a term in the Nebraska House of Representatives representing Sarpy County; in 1896, he had resigned this seat to become probate judge of Sarpy County. In 1900, he made an unsuccessful bid for a seat in Congress. In that same year, he sold the Times, moved to Columbus, and purchased the Telegram. He remained its editor for over fifty years.

In 1901, Howard incorporated the newspaper as the Telegram Company. In 1912, Zela H. Loomis, who had worked as a reporter and day editor for two Fremont, Nebraska newspapers, became managing editor and city editor of the Telegram; in the following year, he became vice-president of the company.

In 1922, the Telegram Company bought out the Columbus Daily News and ended publication of that title; the Telegram went from weekly to daily publication as the Columbus Daily Telegram. In that year, Howard was elected to the United States House of Representatives. He sold most of his stock to his associates in the company; however, at their request, he retained enough to allow him to remain president of the company and editor of the paper for the rest of his life. Howard was re-elected to the House five times, serving from 1923 to 1935. In 1934, he lost the seat to Karl Stefan.

=== After Howard ===
In 1940, Zela Loomis acquired a controlling interest in the Telegram Company and became editor-publisher of the newspaper. After Howard's death in 1951, Loomis's name appeared at the top of the masthead as editor. Zela Loomis died in 1957, whereupon his widow Svea Loomis became president and associate editor, and their son Laird Loomis general manager.

In 1969, the Loomis family sold the newspaper to Freedom Newspapers, Inc. Shortly after the transaction, the "Daily" was removed from the name, leaving it the Columbus Telegram. In 1974, the newspaper made the conversion from letterpress to offset printing.

The Omaha World-Herald Company bought the Telegram from Freedom Newspapers in September 1989. At the same time, the World-Herald bought the Pawnee Scout shopper, which they merged with the Telegram.

In 1998, the World-Herald sold the Telegram to Independent Media Group, Inc. (IMG). At the time of the sale, the paper's circulation was reported as 11,500. IMG was sold to Lee Enterprises and to Liberty Group Publishing in 2000; Lee acquired the Telegram, whose circulation was again reported as 11,500; the circulation of the Scout Shopper was given as 13,000.

== The Telegram today ==
The publisher of the Telegram is Carrie Colburn, who also publishes the daily York News-Times and the weekly David City Banner-Press and Schuyler Sun. Colburn was appointed to the position in 2021. The editor is Monica Garcia.

The market area for the newspaper consists of 24,000 households in seven counties in east central Nebraska: Boone, Butler, Colfax, Merrick, Nance, Platte, and Polk. A weekly supplement, the Telegram Advantage, is delivered to both subscribers and non-subscribers.
