= Scotus Central Catholic High School =

Private coeducational school in Columbus, Nebraska, United States

Location
- 1554 18th Avenue; Columbus, (Platte County), Nebraska 68601; United States; 41°25′54″N 97°20′57″W

Information
- Type: Private, coeducational
- Religious affiliation: Roman Catholic
- Established: 1884
- President: Jeff Ohnoutka
- Principal: Terry Kathol
- Grades: 7–12
- Gender: Coed
- Average class size: 60
- Student to teacher ratio: 16:1
- Colors: Green, white, and gold
- Athletics conference: Centennial
- Mascot: Shamrock
- Team name: Shamrocks
- Rivals: Lakeview High School; Bishop Neumann High School; Aquinas High School
- Accreditation: North Central Association of Colleges and Schools
- Newspaper: Shamrock Lines/The Rock Bottom (student paper)
- Athletic Director: Brady Vancura
- Website: https://columbus-catholic.org/

Scotus Central Catholic High School is a private, Roman Catholic high school in Columbus, Nebraska, United States. It is located in the Roman Catholic Archdiocese of Omaha. Scotus is the only Catholic high school in Columbus, and is the largest Catholic secondary school in Nebraska outside of Omaha or Lincoln.

== History ==
The school was founded in 1884 as St. Francis Academy by the Sisters of St. Francis of Mary Immaculate of Joliet, Illinois, after the sisters added secondary grades to an elementary school they had founded in 1878. St. Bonaventure Catholic Church purchased the school from the order in 1925 and renamed it St. Bonaventure High School. The school was restructured in 1965 to include the support of other area Catholic parishes, and was renamed Scotus Central Catholic in honor of Franciscan scholar John Duns Scotus.

== Elementary ==
Scotus has three Catholic elementary schools linked to it: Saint Anthony's, Saint Isidore's, and Saint Bonaventure's.

== Athletics ==
Scotus Central Catholic is a member of the Nebraska School Activities Association and the Nebraska Centennial Conference.

=== State championships ===
- 1964 Boys' Track & Field (Class B)
- 1967 Football (Class C)-(Pre-playoff era/Omaha World-Herald champion)
- 1978 Boys' Track & Field (Class B)
- 1979 Boys' Track & Field (Class B)
- 1981 Boys' Golf (Class B)
- 1984 Football (Class B)
- 1986 Volleyball (Class B)
- 1990 Volleyball (Class B)
- 1993 Football (Class B)
- 1995 Volleyball (Class C1)
- 1996 Girls' Basketball (Class C1)
- 1996 Volleyball (Class C1)
- 1997 Girls' Basketball (Class C1)
- 1997 Boys' Soccer (Class B)
- 1997 Volleyball (Class C1)
- 1998 Girls' Basketball (Class C1)
- 1998 Girls' Soccer (Class B)
- 1998 Volleyball (Class C1)
- 1999 Volleyball (Class C1)
- 2000 Girls' Cross Country (Class C)
- 2001 Girls' Soccer (Class B)
- 2001 Boys' Soccer (Class B)
- 2001 Girls' Cross Country (Class C)
- 2001 Volleyball (Class C1)
- 2002 Girls' Soccer (Class B)
- 2002 Girls' Cross Country (Class C)
- 2002 Volleyball (Class C1)
- 2003 Volleyball (Class C1)
- 2004 Girls' Basketball (Class C1)
- 2005 Volleyball (Class C1)
- 2006 Volleyball (Class C1)
- 2008 Volleyball (Class C1)
- 2009 Boys' Soccer (Class B)
- 2009 Girls' Track & Field (Class B)
- 2009 Volleyball (Class C1)
- 2011 Boys' Cross Country (Class C)
- 2011 Volleyball (Class C1)
- 2012 Girls' Cross Country (Class C)
- 2013 Girls' Cross Country (Class C)
- 2014 Boys' Soccer (Class B)
- 2015 Boys' Soccer (Class B)
- 2015 Football (Class C1)
- 2016 Boys' Soccer (Class B)
- 2016 Girls' Cross Country (Class C)
- 2017 Journalism (Class B)
- 2018 Girls' Basketball (Class C1)

=== State Runners-up ===
- 1985 Volleyball (Class B)
- 1991 Volleyball (Class B)
- 1993 Volleyball (Class B)
- 1994 Volleyball (Class C1)
- 1995 Girls' Basketball (Class C1)
- 1998 Boys' Soccer (Class B)
- 1999 Girls' Soccer (Class B)
- 2000 Girls' Soccer (Class B)
- 2000 Volleyball (Class C1)
- 2002 Girls' Basketball (Class C1)
- 2004 Volleyball (Class C1)
- 2012 Volleyball (Class C1)
- 2013 Girls' Track & Field (Class B)
- 2013 Girls' Golf (Class C)
- 2014 Boys' Cross Country (Class C)
- 2015 Boys' Basketball (Class C1)
- 2017 Girls' Soccer (Class B)

=== NSAA Cups ===
- Girls: 6 (2008-2009, 2009–2010, 2010–2011, 2011–2012, 2012–2013, 2013–2014)
- Boys: 2 (2014-2015, 2015–2016)
- All-School: 5 (2008-2009, 2013–2014, 2014–2015, 2015–2016, 2016–2017)

== Notable alumni ==
- Joe Blahak, professional football player
- Chuck Hagel, 24th United States Secretary of Defense
- Chad Mustard, professional football player
