= Columbus, Nebraska =

City in and county seat of Platte County, Nebraska, United States

- City
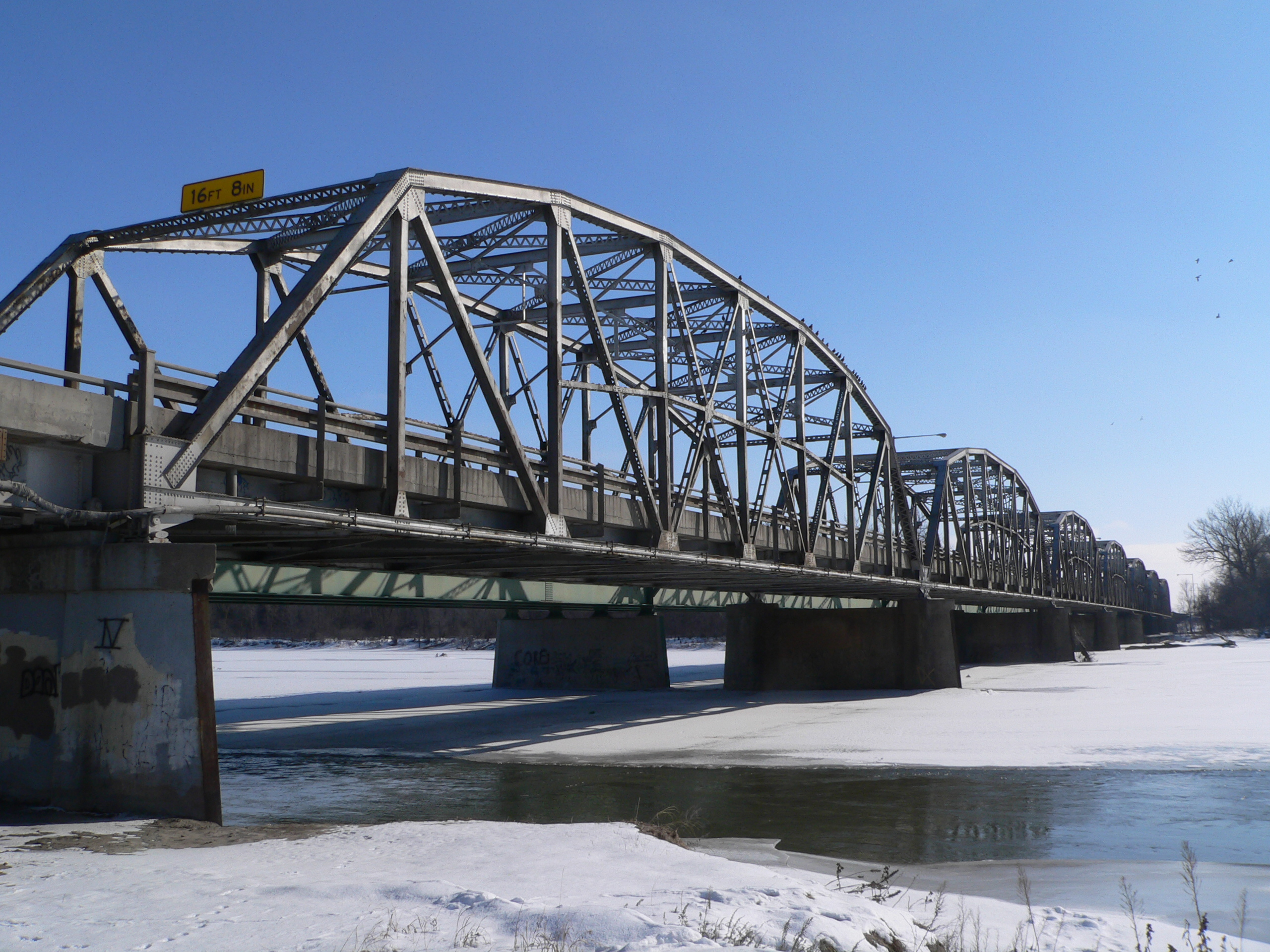
- Bridge carrying U.S. Route 30 and U.S. Route 81 across the Loup River at Columbus, February 2010

- Location within Nebraska Location within the United States
- Coordinates: 41°26′12″N 97°21′24″W
- Country: United States
- State: Nebraska
- County: Platte
- Township: Columbus

Area
  - Total: 10.60 sq mi (27.46 km^{2})
  - Land: 10.34 sq mi (26.78 km^{2})
  - Water: 0.26 sq mi (0.68 km^{2})
- Elevation: 1,447 ft (441 m)

Population (2020)
  - Total: 24,028
  - Density: 2,323.7/sq mi (897.18/km^{2})
- Time zone: UTC−6 (CST)
  - Summer (DST): UTC−5 (CDT)
- ZIP codes: 68601-68602
- Area code: 402
- FIPS code: 31-10110
- GNIS feature ID: 837933
- Intercity Bus: Express Arrow
- Website: columbusne.us

Columbus is the county seat of Platte County, Nebraska, situated at the confluence of the Loup and Platte rivers roughly 85 miles (137 km) west-northwest of Omaha and 75 miles (121 km) northwest of Lincoln by road, near the county's southern edge. With an estimated population of 25,248 as of 2025, it is the 8th-most populous city in Nebraska.

Initially settled in May 1856 along the historic Great Platte River Road, the city was named for Columbus, Ohio; its location along the proposed transcontinental railroad made it especially attractive to early settlers. Despite the construction of a hydroelectric plant, the Great Depression hit the region especially hard. Its economy has since pivoted to one based on agriculture, manufacturing, and services such as healthcare.

Today, Columbus is governed by a mayor and a city council. The city is located in the Omaha media market, and has 6 radio stations licensed to it; it is also home to the Columbus Telegram, a newspaper published five days per week. A campus of Central Community College is located 4 miles (6.4 km) outside Columbus; its sports teams are the Raiders.

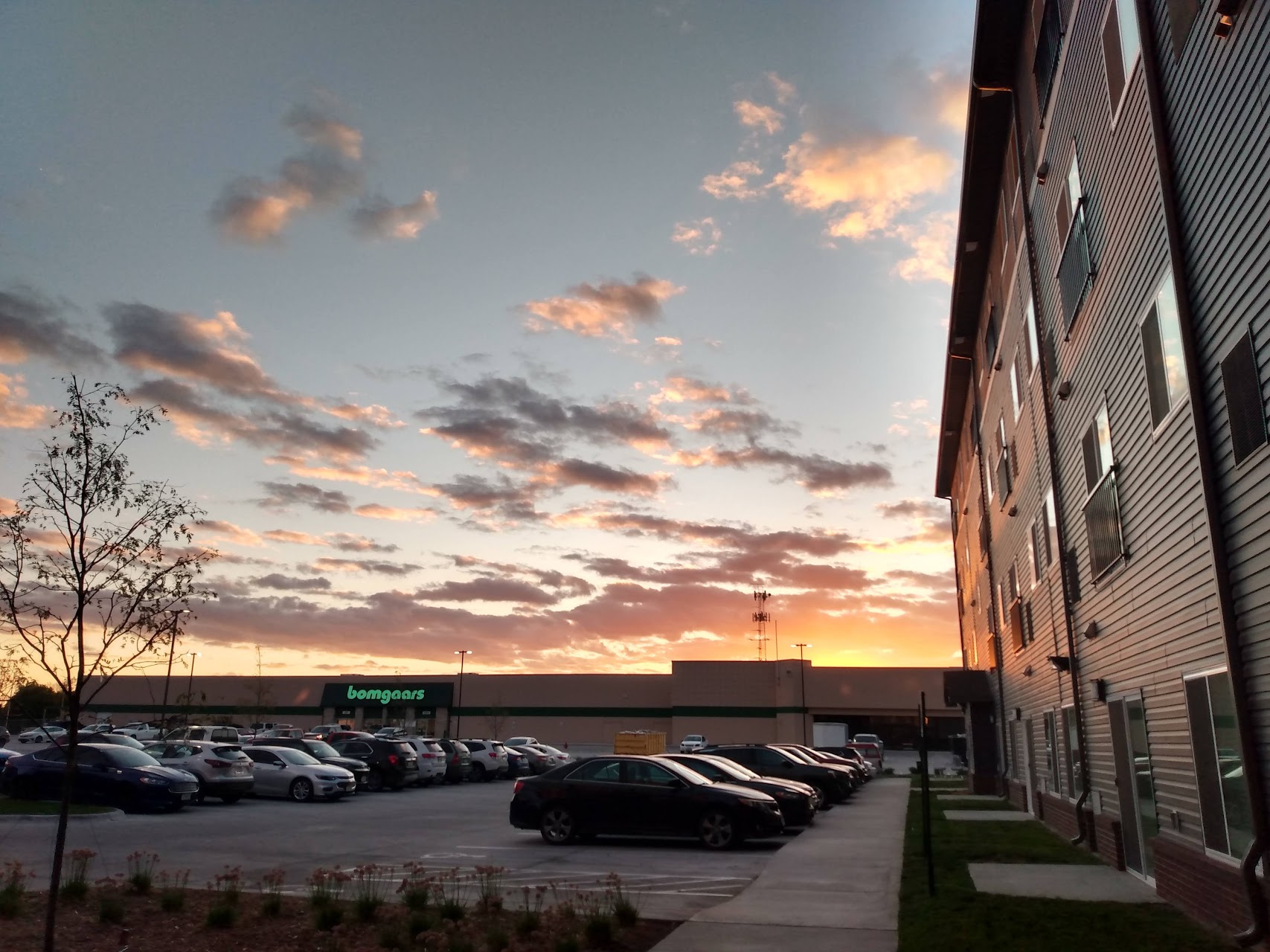
The sun sets in Columbus along 23rd Street.

== History ==
=== Native Americans and Exploration ===
In the 18th century, the area around the confluence of the Platte and the Loup Rivers was used by a variety of Native American tribes, including Pawnee, Otoe, Ponca, and Omaha. The Pawnee are thought to have descended from the Protohistoric Lower Loup Culture; the Otoe had moved from central Iowa into the lower Platte Valley in the early 18th century; and the closely related Omaha and Ponca had moved from the vicinity of the Ohio River mouth, settling along the Missouri by the mid-18th century. In 1720, Pawnee and Otoe allied with the French massacred the Spanish force led by Pedro de Villasur just south of the present site of Columbus. In 1739, the French traders Pierre and Paul Mallet stayed at the Pani-Maha village near this site while making the first known French voyage to Spanish-ruled Santa Fe.

In the 19th century, the "Great Platte River Road"—the valley of the Platte and North Platte Rivers running from Fort Kearny to Fort Laramie— was the principal route of the westward expansion. For travellers following the north bank of the Platte, the Loup River, with its soft banks and quicksands, represented a major obstacle. In the absence of a ferry or a bridge, most of these followed the Loup for a considerable distance upstream before attempting a crossing: the first major wave of Mormon emigrants, for instance, continued up that river to a point about 3 miles (4.8 km) downstream from present-day Fullerton.

=== Settlement and early history ===
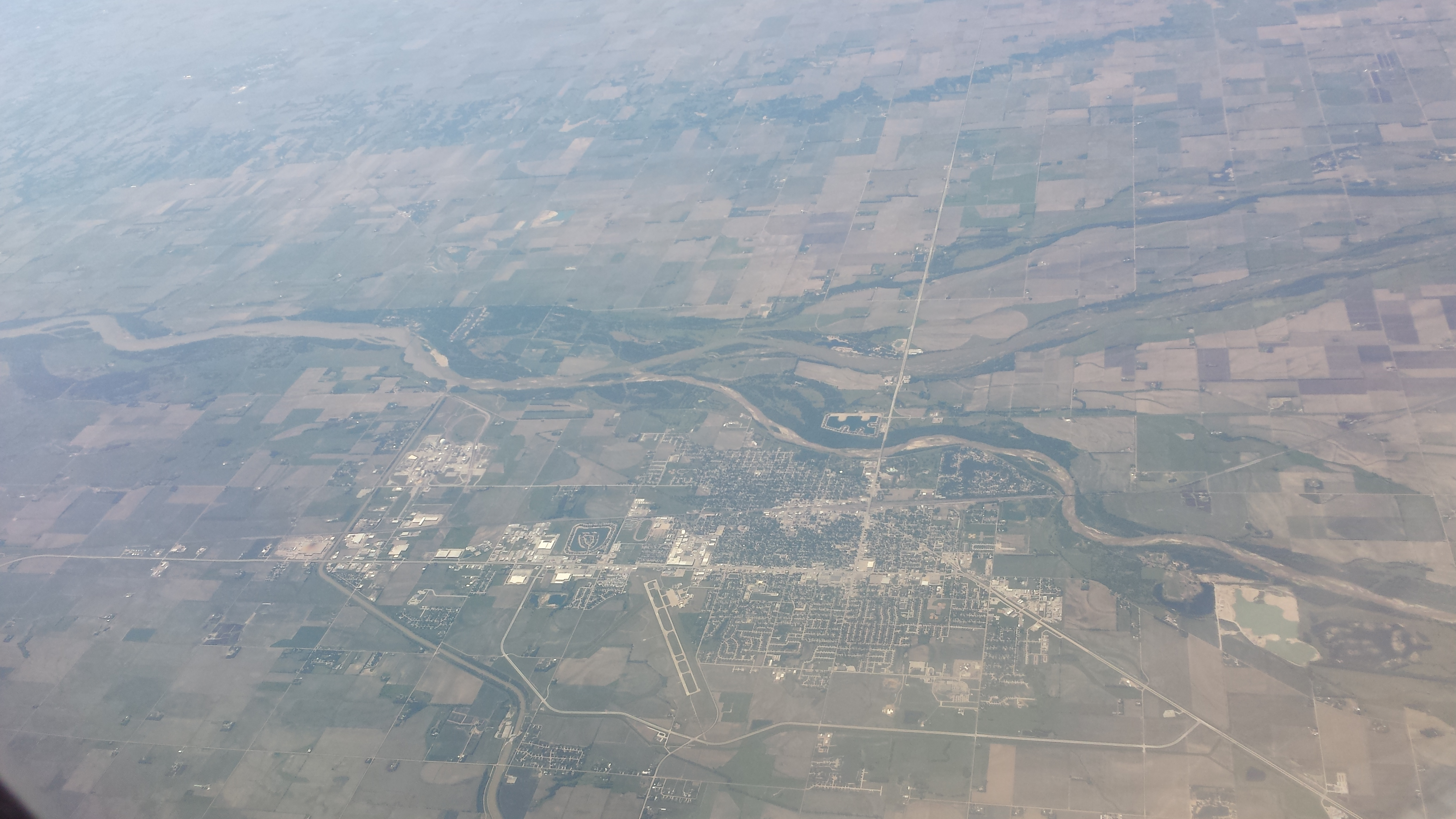
Columbus, seen from an airplane, looking south

The site of Columbus was settled by the Columbus Town Company on May 28, 1856. The group took its name from Columbus, Ohio, where most of the settlers had originally lived. The townsite was selected for its location on the proposed route of the transcontinental railroad.

Just west of the Columbus site, the Elk Horn and Loup Fork Bridge and Ferry Company, headed by James C. Mitchell, had laid out the townsite of Pawnee. In 1855, Mitchell had obtained from the First Nebraska Territorial Legislature the right to operate a ferry across the Loup River. The two companies consolidated in November 1856.

At the time of its initial settling, the land Columbus occupied still belonged to the Pawnee. However, in 1857, the Pawnee signed a treaty whereunder they gave up the bulk of their Nebraska lands, save for a reservation on what is now Nance County, Nebraska.

In 1858, the Platte County Commissioners passed an act of incorporation making Columbus a town; at this time there were 16 citizens. It became the county seat shortly thereafter. In that same year, at the recommendation of the U.S. Army, a ferry across the Loup was installed; contemporary documents suggest that the Mitchell company had failed to act on its right to operate such a ferry.

=== Railroads and growth ===
Growth of the town was slow until 1863. In that year, construction began in Omaha on the transcontinental railroad. The Homestead Act, passed the previous year, attracted a host of settlers to the Plains and gave rise to increased emigrant traffic business. The ferry across the Loup was replaced by a seasonal pontoon bridge, used in the summer and taken up in the winter. The railroad reached Columbus in June 1866, when the city's population was about 75.

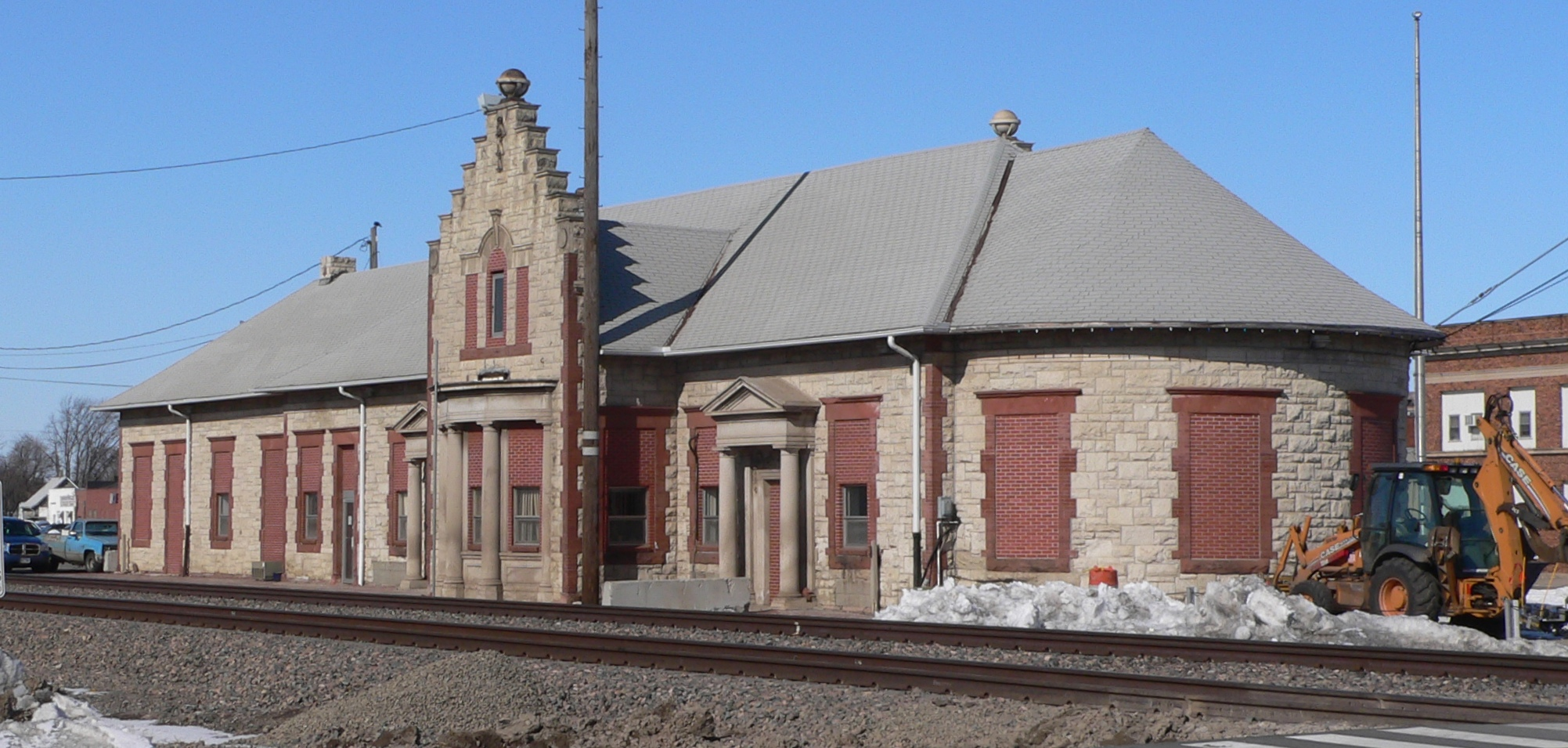
Union Pacific depot in Columbus

The energetic and eccentric promoter George Francis Train envisioned building "a magnificent highway of cities" from coast to coast along the Union Pacific route; Columbus was to be one of these. In 1865, he bought several hundred lots in the city. In the following year, seeing the nearby townsite of Cleveland as a threat to his plans for Columbus, he bought the only building on the site, a hotel, and moved it to Columbus. He renamed the building the Credit Foncier Hotel, after his land company, Credit Foncier of America; in it, he set aside a room permanently reserved for the President of the United States. Train believed that the capital of the United States should be in the geographic center of the nation, and promoted Columbus as "...the new center of the Union and quite probably the future capital of the U.S.A."

Columbus grew and prospered during the 1870s, as a result of both expanding agriculture in Platte County and traffic on the railroad. During the decade, the population of the county grew threefold, and Columbus became the trade center for an eight-county area. The Black Hills Gold Rush in 1875 led the city's merchants to promote it as a staging and outfitting area for gold seekers, who could ride the railroad to Columbus and then travel overland to the gold fields.

In 1879, Columbus became the focus of a war between railroad companies. The Burlington and Missouri proposed to develop a line from Lincoln through Columbus and into northwestern Nebraska, and urged the citizens of Platte County to vote a bond of $100,000 for construction expenses. Union Pacific financier Jay Gould, displeased at the prospect of competition, informed the voters of the county that if the measure passed, he would do his best to ruin Columbus. After a heated campaign, the measure passed despite Gould's threats. The Burlington and Missouri built a line from Lincoln to Columbus, but stopped there; for their diagonal route across Nebraska, they chose one that crossed the Union Pacific at Grand Island rather than Columbus.

Gould sought to make good on his threat. When the Union Pacific developed its subsidiary Omaha, Niobrara and Black Hills Railroad, he directed that it cross the Loup River at Lost Creek, then run south to join the Union Pacific's main line at Jackson (since renamed Duncan), bypassing Columbus. Fortunately for Columbus, an ice jam destroyed the Lost Creek bridge in the spring of 1881. Railroad officials agreed to reroute the line down the north bank of the Loup to Columbus in exchange for a $25,000 contribution from the city.

=== Automobile age ===
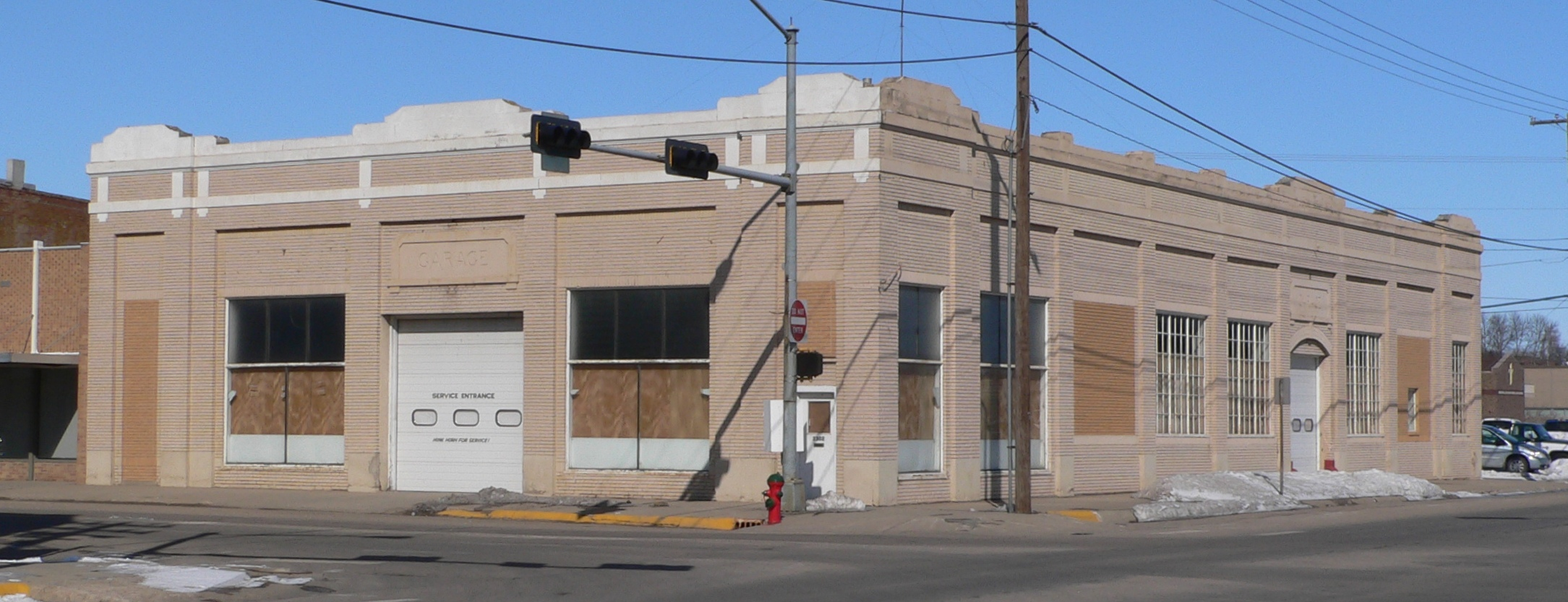
Lincoln Highway Garage, built in downtown Columbus in 1915

In 1911, the Meridian Highway project was launched with the formation of a Meridian Road association in Kansas. Later that same year, John Nicholson, originator of the highway, spoke at a meeting in Columbus, at which the Nebraska Meridian Road Association was organized. The proposed north–south transcontinental highway crossed the Platte and the Loup rivers at the Columbus bridges. In 1922, it was designated a state highway. The completion of the Meridian Bridge in 1924, replacing a seasonal ferry across the Missouri River at the Nebraska-South Dakota border, made the highway a year-round route from Canada to Mexico. In 1928, the route became U.S. Highway 81.

In 1913, the Lincoln Highway was established as an east–west transcontinental highway. It followed the Platte River route across Nebraska; ultimately, about half of its mileage was on the Union Pacific right-of-way. It also crossed the Loup on the bridge at Columbus. In 1926, the route became U.S. Highway 30.

Traffic on the two transcontinental auto routes through and near central Columbus spurred a burst of commercial construction. Hotels were expanded and new ones built; service garages were opened. To make the route through Columbus more attractive to motorists, the city undertook to illuminate and pave the downtown streets. By 1925, all of the city's major commercial thoroughfares were paved, and almost every lot along 13th Street (the Lincoln Highway) between 23rd and 29th Avenues was occupied by a commercial building.

Rural Platte County suffered badly from the Great Depression. Grain and livestock prices had been high during World War I, engendering a bubble in farmland; to acquire additional acres, farmers had secured them with mortgages not only on the newly purchased land, but also on their older holdings. The fall in the prices of agricultural commodities, combined with drought-induced crop failures in 1934 and 1936, forced many such farmers to abandon their lands.

The civic and commercial leaders of Columbus aggressively sought federal and state funds for local construction projects during this time. In 1931, the Meridian Viaduct was completed, carrying the combined Meridian and Lincoln highways across the Union Pacific tracks and eliminating a grade-level crossing. In 1930–31, the aging and inadequate bridge across the Platte was replaced; in 1932–33, a new bridge was built at the Loup crossing.

=== Hydro power ===
The most expensive and ambitious of Columbus's Depression-era public-works efforts was the construction of the Loup Project. This was a 35-mile (56 km) canal running from a diversion weir on the Loup River in Nance County to the Platte River about 1 mile (1.6 km) below the mouth of the Loup. The waters of the canal run through two hydroelectric generating stations: one north of Monroe with a capacity of 7,800 kW; and one at Columbus with a capacity of 45,600 kW.

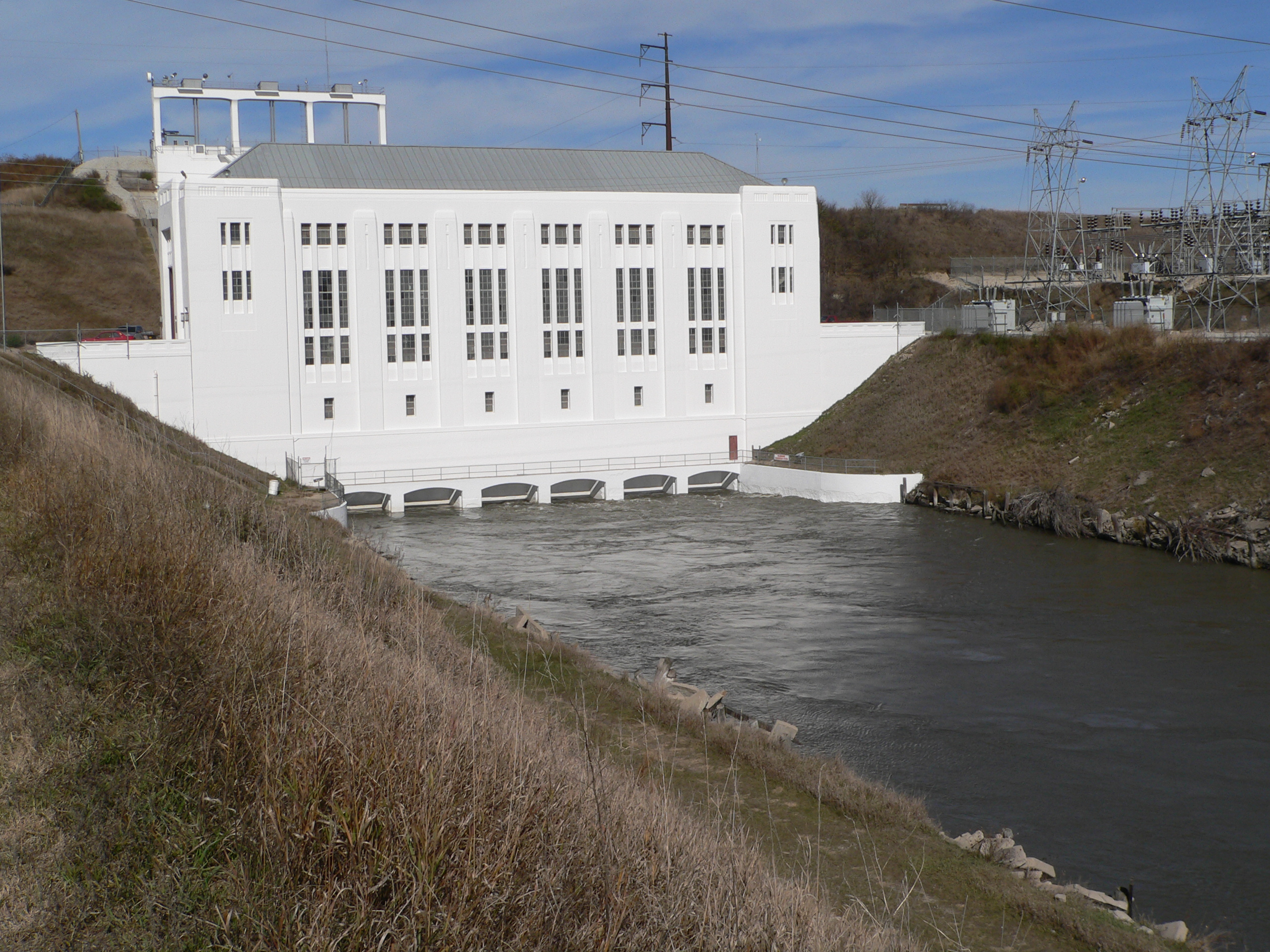
Loup Canal hydroelectric plant and tailrace canal at Columbus

Initially financed with a loan and grant of $7.3 million from the Public Works Administration, construction of the diversion structure, canal, and powerhouses began in August 1934 and was finished, apart from some final details, in September 1938. At its peak, in October 1936, the project directly employed 1,352 people.

To make payments on the Loup Project bonds, the Loup River Public Power District had to find a market for its electricity. Rural electrification was not expanding rapidly, and private power companies in Nebraska were only willing to buy a small fraction of the project's power. Although the provisions of the Public Utility Holding Company Act of 1935 gave East Coast holding companies an incentive to sell off their Nebraska subsidiaries, bankers were unwilling to finance their sale to the Loup District because of its debts from the canal project.

In 1939, Consumers Public Power District was formed in Columbus. The new organization's purpose was to buy power from the Loup Project and from the Tri-County and Sutherland projects on the Platte in central Nebraska, and to market it to consumers and municipal utilities. To this end, it was authorized to issue revenue bonds for the purchase of privately held power companies. By 1942, it had purchased all of the private electrical utilities in Nebraska outside of the immediate vicinity of Omaha; by 1949, the last of the private utilities had been bought up, making Nebraska the only state in the nation to be served entirely by public power.

=== World War II to 2000 ===
With the arrival of World War II, Columbus's boosters sought a war plant for Columbus. They persuaded the federal government to purchase 90 acres (36 ha) in northeastern Columbus, and to build a railroad line to the site. Before construction of the projected aluminum-extrusion plant could begin, however, it became clear that the war would end soon and that the plant would not be needed. The site was sold as surplus property to the Loup District for a fraction of its original cost; the district turned it into an industrial site. In 1946, Behlen Manufacturing built a factory on the site; the rest of the available land was occupied soon thereafter.

Columbus Public Schools in 1968 cut off non-resident students in order to become financially solvent, leaving students north of town without an education. In response, Lakeview Community Schools was formed. There are also several Catholic schools in Columbus, including Scotus Central Catholic High School.

Columbus made headlines in 1997 when 250,000,000 pounds (110,000,000 kg) of beef from a Hudson Foods plant in the city were recalled. At the time, it was the largest recall in United States history.

In 1999, the East-Central District Health Department was formed as the Platte-Colfax County District Health Department. Platte County, including Columbus, is one of four counties served by the health department, which is located in Columbus along with the Good Neighbor Community Health Center.

=== 2000-present ===
Over 20% of Columbus residents are Hispanic or Latino, as of the 2020 census. In 2009, Fernando Lopez, Karen Gomez and Maria Davila founded Columbus-based Centro Hispano Comunitario de Nebraska which provides immigration, education and business services in three counties.

A Columbus man died during the Midwestern flooding in 2019. He had been trying to help someone stranded in the floodwaters when the bridge he was crossing collapsed.

During the COVID-19 pandemic, the Columbus City Council passed a mask mandate in a special meeting held in late November. The council voted four to four on the mandate and Mayor Jim Bulkley broke the tie in favor of the mandate. In January 2021, the council voted on an amended ordinance which required masks only if cases hit a certain level. The ordinance expired on Feb. 23, 2021.

Voters in the 2020 election approved a community building project, with space for a library, a potential children's museum, an art gallery, coffee shop, community room and City Hall. A previous library ballot measure had failed in 2017. Demolition of the library began in May 2021. The Columbus Community Building held its grand opening in July 2023 with the Library and City Hall moving into the building immediately, followed by the Columbus Arts Council, Children's Museum, and a coffee shop.

A fire smoldered at the Columbus Archer Daniels Midland facility for several weeks in summer 2021. Columbus' fire chief resigned less than a week after the public found out about the fire.

In summer 2025, the historic Loup River Bridge was demolished. The nearly century old bridge was in need of severe enhancements to continue serving its purpose. A new bridge funded by sales tax is soon to be under construction. The Nebraska Department of Transportation is working with the city to place a recreation of one of the historic trusses inside Pawnee Park.

== Government ==
Columbus is governed by a mayor and city council, which has eight members who represent four wards. The council members are elected for four-year terms on a staggered basis. Columbus' mayor is also elected for a four-year term. The current mayor is Jim Bulkley and the current council members are Council President Rich Jablonski, Ron Schilling, Hope Freshour, J. Prent Roth, Troy Hiemer, Cynthia Alarcón, Katherine Lopez, and Charlie Bahr.

Evelyn Kusek was the first female city council member and served as the first female council president in 1967 and 1968. Sandra Riley served as the second female city council president in 1991, 1992 and 1993. Beth Augustine-Schulte served as the third female city council president in 2021, 2022, and 2023.

== Geography ==
Columbus is located 85 miles (137 km) west of Omaha and 75 miles (121 km) northwest of Lincoln. It is on the north side of the Loup River near its confluence with the Platte River. U.S. Highways 30 and 81 intersect in the city, and the main line of the Union Pacific railroad passes through it.

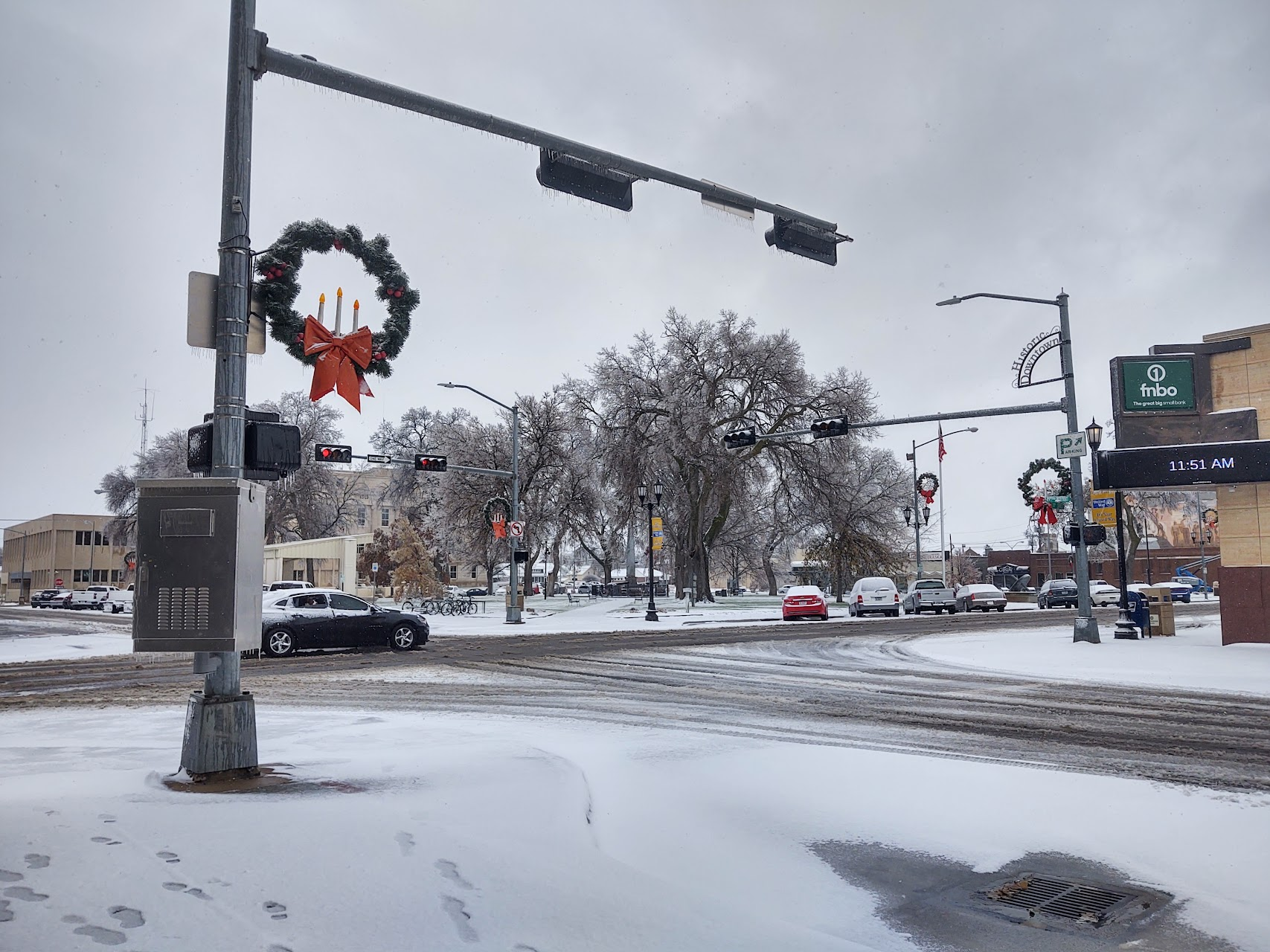
Columbus saw snow in November 2020

The city lies at an elevation of 1,447 feet (441 m). It is built on the flat terrain of the Platte River valley; rolling hills rise to the north of the city.

According to the United States Census Bureau, the city has a total area of 10.08 square miles (26.11 km^{2}), of which 9.85 square miles (25.51 km^{2}) is land and 0.23 square miles (0.60 km^{2}) is water.

=== Climate ===
Columbus has a monsoonal hot-summer humid continental climate (Köppen Dwa) typical of this part of Nebraska, characterized by cold, dry winters and hot, humid summers. Precipitation is concentrated between April and October with a maximum during the late spring and early summer, and averages 26.87 in (682 mm) annually.

Climate data for Columbus, Nebraska (1991–2020, extremes 1893–present)
Month	Jan	Feb	Mar	Apr	May	Jun	Jul	Aug	Sep	Oct	Nov	Dec	Year
Record high °F (°C)	70 (21)	77 (25)	95 (35)	100 (38)	103 (39)	109 (43)	115 (46)	111 (44)	105 (41)	96 (36)	85 (29)	78 (26)	115 (46)
Mean maximum °F (°C)	55.2 (12.9)	60.6 (15.9)	74.4 (23.6)	84.5 (29.2)	91.8 (33.2)	95.9 (35.5)	97.8 (36.6)	95.8 (35.4)	92.2 (33.4)	84.2 (29.0)	70.1 (21.2)	56.1 (13.4)	99.2 (37.3)
Mean daily maximum °F (°C)	32.3 (0.2)	36.6 (2.6)	49.6 (9.8)	61.7 (16.5)	72.8 (22.7)	83.1 (28.4)	86.9 (30.5)	84.2 (29.0)	77.4 (25.2)	63.0 (17.2)	47.7 (8.7)	35.5 (1.9)	60.9 (16.1)
Daily mean °F (°C)	23.1 (−4.9)	27.2 (−2.7)	38.9 (3.8)	50.4 (10.2)	61.9 (16.6)	72.4 (22.4)	76.4 (24.7)	73.9 (23.3)	65.9 (18.8)	52.0 (11.1)	37.7 (3.2)	26.6 (−3.0)	50.5 (10.3)
Mean daily minimum °F (°C)	13.8 (−10.1)	17.7 (−7.9)	28.2 (−2.1)	39.0 (3.9)	51.0 (10.6)	61.7 (16.5)	66.0 (18.9)	63.6 (17.6)	54.5 (12.5)	41.1 (5.1)	27.7 (−2.4)	17.7 (−7.9)	40.2 (4.6)
Mean minimum °F (°C)	−7.6 (−22.0)	−2.9 (−19.4)	7.8 (−13.4)	23.1 (−4.9)	35.6 (2.0)	48.9 (9.4)	55.1 (12.8)	52.7 (11.5)	38.7 (3.7)	23.3 (−4.8)	10.1 (−12.2)	−2.5 (−19.2)	−11.3 (−24.1)
Record low °F (°C)	−29 (−34)	−29 (−34)	−15 (−26)	4 (−16)	22 (−6)	34 (1)	41 (5)	37 (3)	24 (−4)	6 (−14)	−14 (−26)	−25 (−32)	−29 (−34)
Average precipitation inches (mm)	0.65 (17)	0.73 (19)	1.39 (35)	2.93 (74)	4.57 (116)	4.69 (119)	3.46 (88)	3.27 (83)	2.48 (63)	2.35 (60)	1.22 (31)	0.93 (24)	28.67 (728)
Average snowfall inches (cm)	6.6 (17)	6.0 (15)	3.8 (9.7)	1.1 (2.8)	0.0 (0.0)	0.0 (0.0)	0.0 (0.0)	0.0 (0.0)	0.0 (0.0)	0.7 (1.8)	1.8 (4.6)	5.6 (14)	25.6 (65)
Average precipitation days (≥ 0.01 in)	5.0	5.1	6.9	8.5	11.1	10.2	8.6	8.8	7.0	7.3	4.7	5.6	88.8
Average snowy days (≥ 0.1 in)	3.4	3.3	1.5	0.5	0.0	0.0	0.0	0.0	0.0	0.3	1.3	3.4	13.7
Source: NOAA

== Demographics ==
Historical population
Census	Pop.	Note	%±
1870	526		—
1880	2,131		305.1%
1890	3,134		47.1%
1900	3,522		12.4%
1910	5,014		42.4%
1920	5,410		7.9%
1930	6,898		27.5%
1940	7,632		10.6%
1950	8,884		16.4%
1960	12,476		40.4%
1970	15,471		24.0%
1980	17,328		12.0%
1990	19,480		12.4%
2000	20,971		7.7%
2010	22,111		5.4%
2020	24,028		8.7%
U.S. Decennial Census; 2018 Estimate

=== 2020 census ===
As of the 2020 census, Columbus had a population of 24,028, 9,477 households, and 5,732 families. The population density was 2,323.8 per square mile (897.2/km^{2}). There were 9,963 housing units, of which 4.9% were vacant. The homeowner vacancy rate was 1.1% and the rental vacancy rate was 5.3%. 99.8% of residents lived in urban areas, while 0.2% lived in rural areas.

Racial composition as of the 2020 census
Race	Number	Percent
White	17,935	74.6%
Black or African American	355	1.5%
American Indian and Alaska Native	273	1.1%
Asian	180	0.7%
Native Hawaiian and Other Pacific Islander	4	0.0%
Some other race	2,967	12.3%
Two or more races	2,314	9.6%
Hispanic or Latino (of any race)	6,093	25.4%

The median age was 37.7 years. 25.8% of residents were under the age of 18, 7.9% were 18 to 24, 25.1% were 25 to 44, 22.5% were 45 to 64, and 17.4% were 65 years of age or older. For every 100 females there were 98.4 males, and for every 100 females age 18 and over there were 95.5 males age 18 and over.

There were 9,477 households in Columbus, of which 31.7% had children under the age of 18 living in them. Of all households, 49.0% were married-couple households, 18.8% were households with a male householder and no spouse or partner present, and 25.5% were households with a female householder and no spouse or partner present. About 30.0% of all households were made up of individuals and 13.7% had someone living alone who was 65 years of age or older.

The 2016–2020 5-year American Community Survey estimates show that the median household income was $57,919 (with a margin of error of +/- $4,391) and the median family income $75,696 (+/- $4,083). Males had a median income of $40,580 (+/- $2,797) versus $30,000 (+/- $2,355) for females. The median income for those above 16 years old was $33,573 (+/- $2,403). Approximately, 5.2% of families and 8.3% of the population were below the poverty line, including 9.8% of those under the age of 18 and 6.0% of those ages 65 or over.

=== 2010 census ===
As of the census of 2010, there were 22,111 people, 8,874 households, and 5,811 families residing in the city. The population density was 2,244.8 inhabitants per square mile (866.7/km^{2}). There were 9,322 housing units at an average density of 946.4 per square mile (365.4/km^{2}). The racial makeup of the city was 88.1% White, 0.5% African American, 0.9% Native American, 0.5% Asian, 8.2% from other races, and 1.8% from two or more races. Hispanic or Latino of any race were 16.3% of the population.

There were 8,874 households, of which 32.5% had children under the age of 18 living with them, 51.4% were married couples living together, 9.7% had a female householder with no husband present, 4.3% had a male householder with no wife present, and 34.5% were non-families. 29.9% of all households were made up of individuals, and 12.3% had someone living alone who was 65 years of age or older. The average household size was 2.45 and the average family size was 3.04.

The median age in the city was 37.1 years. 26.4% of residents were under the age of 18; 8% were between the ages of 18 and 24; 24.8% were from 25 to 44; 25.4% were from 45 to 64; and 15.3% were 65 years of age or older. The gender makeup of the city was 49.5% male and 50.5% female.

=== 2000 census ===
As of the census of 2000, there were 20,971 people, 8,302 households, and 5,562 families residing in the city. The population density was 2,337.3 inhabitants per square mile (902.4/km^{2}). There were 8,818 housing units at an average density of 982.8 per square mile (379.5/km^{2}). The racial makeup of the city was 87.19% White, 1.45% African American, 0.35% Native American, 0.48% Asian, 0.04% Pacific Islander, 3.49% from other races, and 1.00% from two or more races. Hispanic or Latino of any race were 12.65% of the population.

There were 8,302 households, out of which 34.7% had children under the age of 18 living with them, 54.7% were married couples living together, 8.9% had a female householder with no husband present, and 33.0% were non-families. 28.5% of all households were made up of individuals, and 12.3% had someone living alone who was 65 years of age or older. The average household size was 2.50 and the average family size was 3.09.

In the city, the population was spread out, with 28.2% under the age of 18, 8.4% from 18 to 24, 28.0% from 25 to 44, 20.8% from 45 to 64, and 14.6% who were 65 years of age or older. The median age was 36 years. For every 100 females, there were 94.1 males. For every 100 females age 18 and over, there were 90.3 males.

The median income for a household in the city was $38,874, and the median income for a family was $48,669. Males had a median income of $30,980 versus $22,063 for females. The per capita income for the city was $18,345. About 4.5% of families and 6.9% of the population were below the poverty line, including 7.7% of those under age 18 and 6.5% of those age 65 or over.

== Economy ==
Columbus's economy is based on agriculture and manufacturing, with many industrial companies attracted by cheap, plentiful hydroelectric power. Major manufacturing employers include Becton Dickinson, a medical products company that operates two facilities in Columbus; Behlen Manufacturing, which produces steel buildings, grain bins, and agricultural equipment; Columbus Hydraulics Co. is an Hydraulic cylinder manufacturing company that designs and manufactures hydraulic cylinders for agriculture, construction, turf, utility, and railroad; CAMACO, a manufacturer of automotive seat frames; Cargill, which operates a ground-beef processing plant; Archer Daniels Midland, which runs a corn-milling facility; Vishay Dale Electronics, a subsidiary of Vishay Intertechnology that produces electronic components; FLEXcon, which manufactures various adhesives, particularly those used in medical fields. Major non-manufacturing employers include Nebraska Public Power District, which is headquartered in Columbus; Columbus Public Schools; and Columbus Community Hospital.

== Media ==
Columbus has one newspaper, the Columbus Telegram. The newspaper is published five days a week.

There are 6 radio stations in Columbus. KTLX at FM 91.3 is a religious station; KKOT at FM 93.5 plays classic hits. KZEN at FM 100.3 broadcasts country music; the station is licensed in Central City, but the studio is in Columbus. KLIR at FM 101.1 plays adult contemporary music; KJSK at AM 900 is a news talk station; and KTTT at AM 1510 is a polka and oldies country station.

== Education ==
A Carnegie library was built in 1913–15; the current Columbus Public Library replaced it in 1977. The 1977 library would be torn down in 2023 to make way for the new Columbus Community Building.

=== Central Community College ===
A campus of Central Community College is located 4 miles (6.4 km) northwest of the city. Its athletic teams are the Raiders. This campus originally opened in 1969 as Platte Junior College and was the first county supported college in the state.

=== Primary and secondary schools ===
Columbus Public Schools operates Columbus High School, a middle school and five elementary schools: Centennial, West Park, North Park, Lost Creek, and Emerson. The district closed several elementary schools, most recently the nearby Duncan Elementary School, which had been in the district since 1967. Columbus High School, with 1,300 students, is the largest area high school. Its athletic teams are the Discoverers.

Scotus Central Catholic High School is a Catholic school named after John Duns Scotus; it serves grades 7 through 12. Its teams are the Shamrocks.

Lakeview Community Schools, including Lakeview High School, serves a rural community north of the city. The school district is located just north of Lake Babcock, and its teams are the Vikings.

== Attractions ==
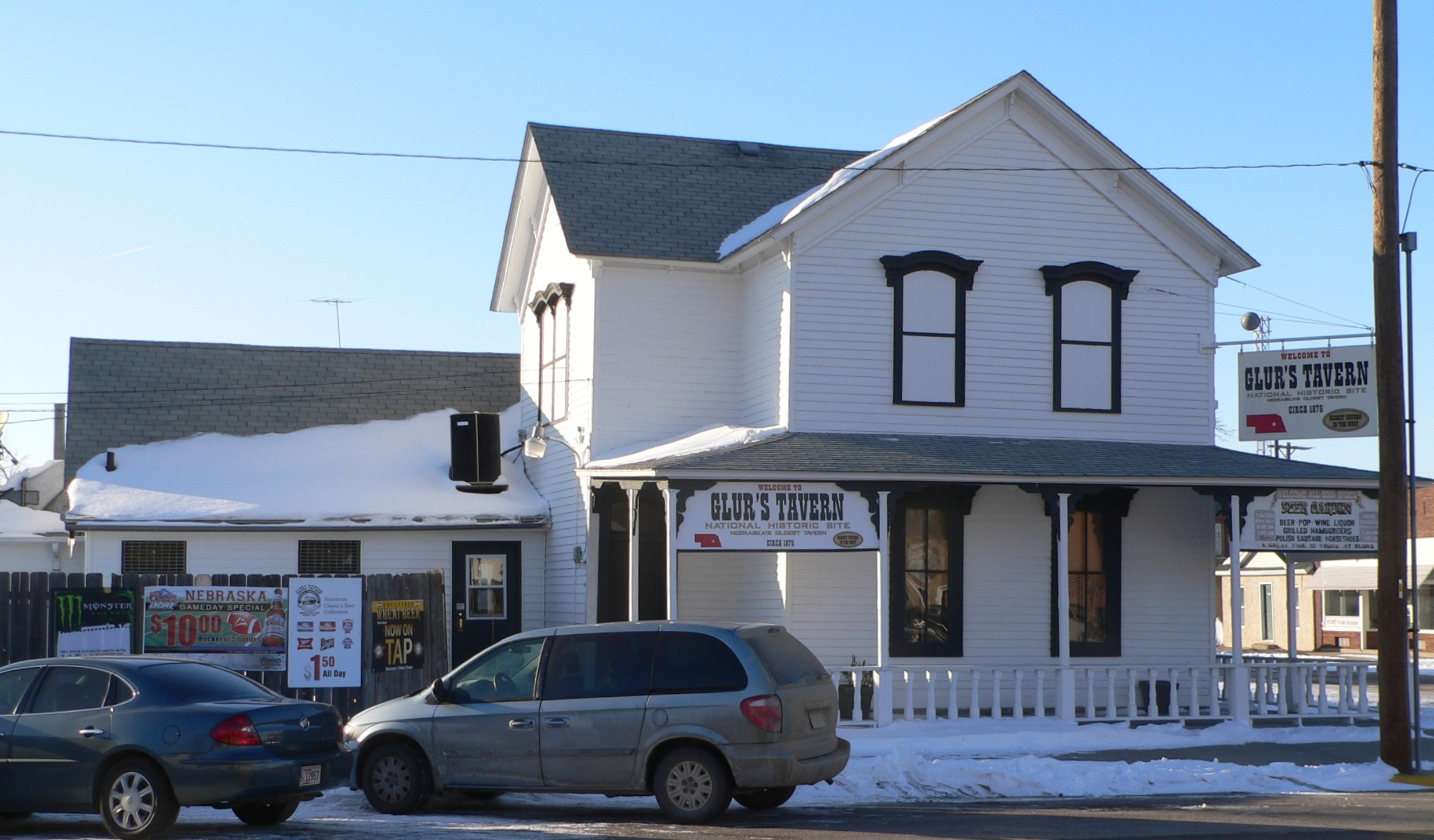
Glur's Tavern

The Andrew Jackson Higgins National Memorial in Pawnee Park features a life-sized replica of a Higgins boat with bronze statues of soldiers exiting into the sand. The memorial includes sand samples from 58 beaches of historic significance: D-Day beaches of World War II, and beaches in Korea and Vietnam. The site is also home to the Freedom Memorial, which incorporates steel from the remains of the World Trade Center, destroyed by terrorist attacks on September 11, 2001.

Glur's Tavern, built in 1876, is the oldest tavern west of the Missouri River still in operation. The tavern was patronized by "Buffalo Bill" Cody during his frequent visits to Columbus. The tavern is listed in the National Register of Historic Places.

The Platte County Agricultural Society hosts a number of events at Agricultural Park. The Platte County Fair is held there annually.

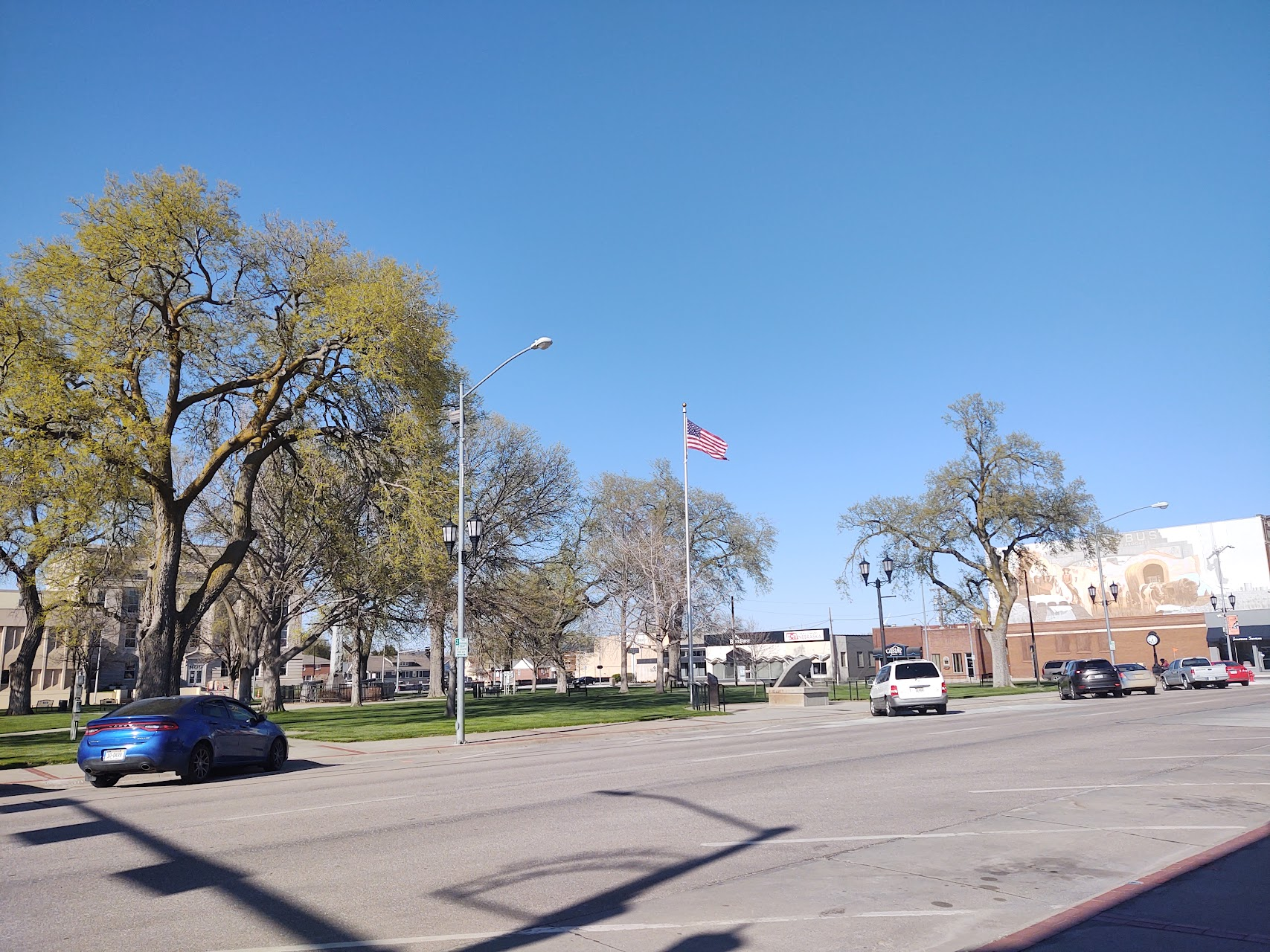
Frankfort Square in downtown Columbus is a park in Columbus, Nebraska, where activities like Columbus Days and Lawn Chairs on the Square take place.

U.S. 30 Speedway stages weekly auto races from April to September.

The Columbus Marching Festival is held every September, hosting High School marching bands from in and outside of the state. The Columbus Days Parade is held a week in August in downtown Columbus.

Pawnee Plunge is an outdoor water park located in Columbus. It first opened in late May 2006, and features four main waterslides that include a tube slide, a regular slide, a speed slide, and a unique splashbowl slide that visitors often refer to as the "toilet bowl." The park also has a small "lazy river." During its first week, the park attracted over 13,000 visitors. The park is funded by the City of Columbus with a 1/2-cent sales tax.

The passage of Nebraska Initiatives 429, 430, and 431 in 2020 permitted a casino in Columbus. Opening in 2023, for a short period Caesars operated inside Ag Park as The Columbus Casino. The full casino would open on the former site of Wishbone's roller skating rink on the 17th of May, 2024. The casino features table games, nearly 500 slot machines, a sports book, two restaurants, and an attached hotel. It also hosts the longest horse race track in Nebraska at one mile.

== Notable people ==
Columbus is the birthplace of Andrew Jackson Higgins, creator/designer of the Landing Craft, Vehicle, Personnel (LCVP or Higgins boat), used during World War II.

Noteworthy current or former residents of Columbus include Chuck Hagel, US Secretary of Defense from 2013 to 2015; actor Brad William Henke; world heavyweight boxing champion Leon Spinks; architect Emiel Christensen; and NFL football players Joe Blahak, Cory Schlesinger, and Chad Mustard.

Lucas Cruikshank, creator of YouTube series FRED and its main character Fred Figglehorn, is a former Columbus resident.

Lon Milo DuQuette, occultist author and musician, is a graduate of Columbus High School.

Lotan Harold DeWolf (31 January 1905 – 24 March 1986), usually cited as L. Harold Dewolf, was an American Methodist minister and professor of systematic theology at Boston University where he was Martin Luther King Jr.'s "primary teacher and mentor".DeWolf was born on 31 January 1905 in Columbus, Nebraska. He obtained a Bachelor of Arts degree from Nebraska Wesleyan University in 1924, then pursued theological studies at Boston University where, in 1926, he obtained a Bachelor of Sacred Theology degree. His father was a minister at the First Methodist Church in Columbus.

Marion Van Berg (January 15, 1896 – May 3, 1971) was an American Thoroughbred racehorse trainer. He was inducted into the National Museum of Racing and Hall of Fame in 1970.[1] His son, Jack Van Berg, also went on to racing horse fame. Van Berg Stables was headquartered in Columbus, NE at the location of the Van Berg Sales Pavilion.

Jack Van Berg John Charles "Jack" Van Berg, (June 7, 1936 in Columbus, Nebraska – December 27, 2017) was an American Hall of Fame horse trainer. Born into a horse racing family, his father was the Hall of Fame trainer, Marion Van Berg. Both father and son have been inducted into the National Museum of Racing and Hall of Fame in Saratoga Springs, New York.

Jim Pillen (born December 31, 1955) is an American politician, veterinarian and livestock producer serving as the 41st and current Governor of Nebraska since 2023. A member of the Republican Party, Pillen served on the University of Nebraska Board of Regents from 2013 to 2023.

Ernest Hausmann (born August 20, 2003) is an American football linebacker. A native of Uganda, he played college football for Nebraska in 2022 and entered the NCAA transfer portal after the 2022 season where he was ranked the top player in the portal. He transferred to the Michigan Wolverines, winning a national championship the next year.

== See also ==
- List of municipalities in Nebraska
