= List of high schools in Nebraska =

This is a list of high schools in the state of Nebraska.

Note:The enrollment and diversity data provided in this article is derived from 2024-2025 MEMBERSHIP BY GRADE, RACE AND GENDER published by the Nebraska Department of Education for grades 9-12. Diversity measures the percentage of historically underrepresented members of each student body for grades 9-12.

== Adams County ==
School Name	District / Status	City	Mascot	2024-2025 Enrollment	2024-2025 Diversity(%)
Adams Central High School	Adams Central Schools	Hastings	Patriots	306	6.21%
Hastings High School	Hastings Public Schools	Hastings	Tigers	991	35.12%
Kenesaw Secondary School	Kenesaw Public Schools	Kenesaw	Blue Devils	94	5.32%
St. Cecilia High School	Private (Catholic)	Hastings	Bluehawks	121	12.40%
Silver Lake High School	Silver Lake Public Schools	Roseland	Mustangs^{[1]}	67	2.99%
West Hastings High School	Hastings Public Schools	Hastings		22	81.82%

=== Defunct schools ===
School Name	District / Status	City	Mascot
Ayr High School	Closed (1947)	Ayr	Kites
Holstein High School	Closed (1970)	Holstein	Wildcats
Juniata High School	Closed (1967)	Juniata	Dragons
Pauline High School	Closed (1946)	Pauline	
Prosser High School	Closed (1937)	Prosser	

1. Formerly known as the Roseland Cardinals prior to consolidation with Bladen and the formation of Silver Lake High School in 1986.

== Antelope County ==
School Name	District / Status	City	Mascot	2024-2025 Enrollment	2024-2025 Diversity(%)
Elgin High School	Elgin Public Schools	Elgin	Wolfpack	55	3.64%
Neligh-Oakdale High School	Neligh-Oakdale Schools	Neligh	Warriors	85	18.82%
Pope John XXIII Central Catholic High School	Private (Catholic)	Elgin	Crusaders	30	10.00%
Summerland High School	Summerland Public Schools	Ewing	Bobcats	144	13.19%

=== Defunct schools ===
School Name	District / Status	City	Mascot
Brunswick High School	Closed (1965)	Brunswick	Bluejays
Clearwater High School	Closed (2021)	Clearwater	Cardinals
Oakdale High School	Closed (1968)	Oakdale	Antelopes
Orchard High School	Closed (2011)	Orchard	Orioles
Royal High School	Closed (1968)	Royal	Cardinals

== Arthur County ==
School Name	District / Status	City	Mascot	2024-2025 Enrollment	2024-2025 Diversity(%)
Arthur County High School	Arthur County Schools	Arthur	Wolves	43	2.33%

== Banner County ==
School Name	District / Status	City	Mascot	2024-2025 Enrollment	2024-2025 Diversity(%)
Banner County High School	Banner County Public Schools	Harrisburg	Wildcats	37	16.22%

== Blaine County ==
School Name	District / Status	City	Mascot	2024-2025 Enrollment	2024-2025 Diversity(%)
Sandhills High School	Sandhills Public Schools	Dunning	Knights^{[1]}	24	8.33%

=== Defunct schools ===
School Name	District / Status	City	Mascot
Brewster High School	Closed (1970)	Brewster	Broncos

1. Formerly known as the Dunning Tigers prior to consolidation.

== Boone County ==
School Name	District / Status	City	Mascot	2024-2025 Enrollment	2024-2025 Diversity(%)
Boone Central High School	Boone Central Schools	Albion	Cardinals	210	9.52%
Riverside High School	Riverside Public Schools	Cedar Rapids	Chargers	77	10.39%
St. Edward High School	St. Edward Public Schools	St. Edward	Beavers	54	27.78%

=== Defunct schools ===
School Name	District / Status	City	Mascot
Petersburg High School	Closed (2001)	Petersburg	Pirates
Primrose High School	Closed (1966)	Primrose	Cardinals

== Box Butte County ==
School Name	District / Status	City	Mascot	2024-2025 Enrollment	2024-2025 Diversity(%)
Alliance High School	Alliance Public Schools	Alliance	Bulldogs	451	38.36%
Hemingford High School	Hemingford Public Schools	Hemingford	Bobcats	114	15.79%

== Boyd County ==
School Name	District / Status	City	Mascot	2024-2025 Enrollment	2024-2025 Diversity(%)
Boyd County High School	Boyd County Unified	Spencer	Spartans^{[1]}	97	17.53%

=== Defunct schools ===
School Name	District / Status	City	Mascot
Anoka High School	Closed (1942)	Anoka	
Bristow High School	Closed (1960)	Bristow	Vikings
Butte High School	Closed (2007)	Butte	Wildcats
Gross High School	Closed (1944)	Gross	
Lynch High School	Closed (2017)	Lynch	Eagles
Monowi High School	Closed (1931)	Monowi	
Naper High School	Closed (1988)	Naper	Bears

1. Formerly known as the Spencer Pirates prior to consolidation.

== Brown County ==
School Name	District / Status	City	Mascot	2024-2025 Enrollment	2024-2025 Diversity(%)
Ainsworth High School	Ainsworth Community Schools	Ainsworth	Bulldogs	104	20.19%

=== Defunct schools ===
School Name	District / Status	City	Mascot
Johnstown High School	Closed (1944)	Johnstown	Moose
Long Pine High School	Closed (1966)	Long Pine	Polar Bears

== Buffalo County ==
School Name	District / Status	City	Mascot	2024-2025 Enrollment	2024-2025 Diversity(%)
Amherst High School	Amherst Public Schools	Amherst	Broncos	98	8.16%
Elm Creek High School	Elm Creek Public Schools	Elm Creek	Buffaloes	97	5.15%
Gibbon High School	Gibbon Public Schools	Gibbon	Buffaloes	167	52.10%
Kearney Catholic High School	Private (Catholic)	Kearney	Stars	196	13.78%
Kearney High School	Kearney Public Schools	Kearney	Bearcats	1,663	21.53%
Pleasanton High School	Pleasanton Public Schools	Pleasanton	Bulldogs	90	3.33%
Ravenna High School	Ravenna Public Schools	Ravenna	Bluejays	116	11.21%
Shelton High School	Shelton Public Schools	Shelton	Bulldogs	76	26.32%
West Kearney High School	Kearney Public Schools	Kearney		65	75.38%

=== Defunct schools ===
School Name	District / Status	City	Mascot
Miller High School	Closed (1958)	Miller	Pirates
Odessa High School	Closed (1958)	Odessa	Cardinals
Riverdale High School	Closed (1958)	Riverdale	Bluejays

== Burt County ==
School Name	District / Status	City	Mascot	2024-2025 Enrollment	2024-2025 Diversity(%)
Lyons-Decatur Northeast Secondary School	Lyons-Decatur Northeast Schools	Lyons	Cougars^{[1]}	92	15.22%
Oakland-Craig High School	Oakland-Craig Public Schools	Oakland	Knights^{[2]}	124	18.55%
Tekamah-Herman High School	Tekamah-Herman Community Schools	Tekamah	Tigers	162	6.79%

=== Defunct schools ===
School Name	District / Status	City	Mascot
Craig High School	Closed (1969)	Craig	Wolves
Decatur High School	Closed (1984)	Decatur	Bulldogs

1. Formerly known as the Lyons Lions prior to consolidation.
2. Formerly known as the Oakland Vikings prior to consolidation.

== Butler County ==
School Name	District / Status	City	Mascot	2024-2025 Enrollment	2024-2025 Diversity(%)
Aquinas High School	Private (Catholic)	David City	Monarchs	117	4.27%
David City Secondary School	David City Public Schools	David City	Scouts	222	15.32%
East Butler High School	East Butler Public Schools	Brainard	Tigers^{[1]}	96	11.46%

1. Formerly known as the Brainard Tigers prior to consolidation.

=== Defunct schools ===
School Name	District / Status	City	Mascot
Bellwood High School	Closed (1961)	Bellwood	Broncos
Bruno High School	Closed (1948 or 1949)	Bruno	Blues
Dwight High School	Closed (1953)	Dwight	Panthers
Dwight Assumption High School	Closed (1962)	Dwight	Bluejays
Garrison High School	Closed (1944)	Garrison	Maroon & Gold
Linwood High School	Closed (1958)	Linwood	Indians
Octavia High School	Closed (1951)	Octavia	
Rising City High School	Closed (2011)	Rising City	Tigers
Surprise High School	Closed (1952)	Surprise	Red & White
Ulysses High School	Closed (1960)	Ulysses	Trojans

== Cass County ==
School Name	District / Status	City	Mascot	2024-2025 Enrollment	2024-2025 Diversity(%)
Conestoga High School	Conestoga Public Schools	Murray	Cougars	221	10.41%
Elmwood-Murdock High School	Elmwood-Murdock Public Schools	Murdock	Knights^{[1]}	121	3.31%
Louisville High School	Louisville Public Schools	Louisville	Lions	207	6.28%
Plattsmouth High School	Plattsmouth Community Schools	Plattsmouth	Blue Devils	474	13.71%
Weeping Water High School	Weeping Water Public Schools	Weeping Water	Indians	86	12.79%

1. Formerly known as the Murdock Bulldogs prior to consolidation.

=== Defunct schools ===
School Name	District / Status	City	Mascot
Alvo High School	Closed (1960)	Alvo	Orioles
Avoca High School	Closed (1968)	Avoca	Cardinals
Eagle High School	Closed (1966)	Eagle	Eagles
Elmwood High School	Closed (1990)	Elmwood	Panthers
Greenwood High School	Closed (1957)	Greenwood	Trojans
Nehawka High School	Closed (1977)	Nehawka	Indians
Union High School	Closed (1956)	Union	Yankees

== Cedar County ==
School Name	District / Status	City	Mascot	2024-2025 Enrollment	2024-2025 Diversity(%)
Cedar Catholic High School	Private (Catholic)	Hartington	Trojans	123	0.81%
Hartington-Newcastle High School	Hartington-Newcastle Public Schools	Hartington	Wildcats	105	9.52%
Laurel-Concord-Coleridge High School	Laurel-Concord-Coleridge Public Schools	Laurel	Bears	135	8.89%
Randolph High School	Randolph Public Schools	Randolph	Cardinals	69	7.25%
Wynot Secondary School	Wynot Public Schools	Wynot	Blue Devils	56	1.79%

=== Defunct schools ===
School Name	District / Status	City	Mascot
Belden High School	Closed (1966)	Belden	Braves
Coleridge High School	Closed (2010)	Coleridge	Bulldogs
Magnet High School	Closed (1956)	Magnet	
Obert High School	Closed (1969)	Obert	Green & White

== Chase County ==
School Name	District / Status	City	Mascot	2024-2025 Enrollment	2024-2025 Diversity(%)
Chase County High School	Chase County Schools	Imperial	Longhorns^{[1]}	208	29.33%
Wauneta-Palisade High School	Wauneta-Palisade Public Schools	Wauneta	Broncos	79	15.19%

1. Formerly known as the Imperial Longhorns prior to consolidation.

== Cherry County ==
School Name	District / Status	City	Mascot	2024-2025 Enrollment	2024-2025 Diversity(%)
Cody-Kilgore High School	Cody-Kilgore Public Schools	Cody	Cowboys	47	31.91%
Valentine High School	Valentine Community Schools	Valentine	Badgers	158	28.48%

=== Defunct schools ===
School Name	District / Status	City	Mascot
Crookston High School	Closed (1955)	Crookston	Bulldogs
Kilgore High School	Closed (1966)	Kilgore	Cardinals
Merriman High School	Closed (1969)	Merriman	Bluejays
Wood Lake High School	Closed (1963)	Wood Lake	Longhorns

== Cheyenne County ==
School Name	District / Status	City	Mascot	2024-2025 Enrollment	2024-2025 Diversity(%)
Leyton High School	Leyton Public Schools	Dalton	Warriors^{[1]}	53	13.21%
Potter-Dix High School	Potter-Dix Public Schools	Potter	Coyotes	56	7.14%
Sidney High School	Sidney Public Schools	Sidney	Red Raiders	329	16.11%

1. Formerly known as the Dalton Tigers prior to consolidation.

=== Defunct schools ===
School Name	District / Status	City	Mascot
Gurley High School	Closed (1978)	Gurley	Pirates
Lodgepole High School	Closed (2004)	Lodgepole	Panthers
Lorenzo High School	Closed (1969)	Lorenzo	Antelopes
St. Patrick's High School	Closed (1991)	Sidney	Irish
Sunol High School	Closed (1966)	Sunol	Mustangs

== Clay County ==
School Name	District / Status	City	Mascot	2024-2025 Enrollment	2024-2025 Diversity(%)
Harvard High School	Harvard Public Schools	Harvard	Cardinals	50	32.00%
Sandy Creek High School	Sandy Creek Schools	Fairfield	Cougars^{[1]}	124	11.29%
Sutton High School	Sutton Public Schools	Sutton	Mustangs	114	19.30%

1. Formerly known as the Fairfield Eagles prior to consolidation.

=== Defunct schools ===
School Name	District / Status	City	Mascot	2024-2025 Enrollment	2024-2025 Diversity(%)
Clay Center High School	Closed (2008)	Clay Center	Wildcats		
Deweese High School	Closed (1947)	Deweese			
Edgar High School	Closed (1966)	Edgar	Huskies		
Glenvil High School	Closed (1966)	Glenvil	Bulldogs		
Inland High School	Closed (1943)	Inland			
Ong High School	Closed (1966)	Ong	Red Devils		
Trumbull High School	Closed (2000)	Trumbull	Bearcats		

== Colfax County ==
School Name	District / Status	City	Mascot	2024-2025 Enrollment	2024-2025 Diversity(%)
Clarkson High School	Clarkson Public Schools	Clarkson	Red Devils; Patriots^{[1]}	78	8.97%
Howells-Dodge High School	Howells-Dodge Consolidated Schools	Howells	Jaguars	89	12.36%
Leigh High School	Leigh Community Schools	Leigh	Panthers; Patriots^{[2]}	66	3.03%
Schuyler Central High School	Schuyler Community Schools	Schuyler	Warriors	643	89.43%

1. Clarkson is part of the Clarkson Leigh Patriots athletic Co-Op with Leigh High School.
2. Leigh is part of the Clarkson Leigh Patriots athletic Co-Op with Clarkson High School.

== Cuming County ==
School Name	District / Status	City	Mascot	2024-2025 Enrollment	2024-2025 Diversity(%)
Bancroft-Rosalie High School	Bancroft-Rosalie Community Schools	Bancroft	Panthers^{[1]}	76	38.16%
Guardian Angels Central Catholic High School	Private (Catholic)	West Point	Bluejays	107	3.74%
West Point-Beemer High School	West Point Public Schools	West Point	Cadets	225	47.56%
Wisner-Pilger High School	Wisner-Pilger Public Schools	Wisner	Gators	131	16.03%

1. Formerly known as the Bancroft Bulldogs prior to consolidation.

=== Defunct schools ===
School Name	District / Status	City	Mascot
Beemer High School	Closed (2003)	Beemer	Bobcats

== Custer County ==
School Name	District / Status	City	Mascot	2024-2025 Enrollment	2024-2025 Diversity(%)
Anselmo-Merna High School	Anselmo-Merna Public Schools	Merna	Coyotes	65	0.00%
Ansley High School	Ansley Public Schools	Ansley	Spartans	50	10.00%
Arnold High School	Arnold Public Schools	Arnold	Cardinals	48	6.25%
Broken Bow High School	Broken Bow Public Schools	Broken Bow	Indians	234	14.53%
Callaway High School	Callaway Public Schools	Callaway	Bears	52	7.69%
Twin Loup High School	Sargent Public Schools	Sargent	Wolves	50	8.00%

=== Defunct schools ===
School Name	District / Status	City	Mascot	2024-2025 Enrollment	2024-2025 Diversity(%)
Anselmo High School	Closed (1960)	Anselmo	Eagles		
Berwyn High School	Closed (1951/1952)	Berwyn	Eagles		
Comstock High School	Closed (1965)	Comstock	Pirates		
Mason City High School	Closed (1970s)	Mason City	Wildcats		
Milburn High School	Closed (1966)	Milburn	Badgers		
Oconto High School	Closed (1978)	Oconto	Tigers		
Westerville High School	Closed (1950s)	Westerville	Wildcats		

== Dakota County ==
School Name	District / Status	City	Mascot	2024-2025 Enrollment	2024-2025 Diversity(%)
Homer High School	Homer Community Schools	Homer	Knights	136	32.35%
South Sioux City High School	South Sioux City Community Schools	South Sioux City	Cardinals	1,193	85.58%

=== Defunct schools ===
School Name	District / Status	City	Mascot
Dakota City High School	Closed	Dakota City	Wildcats
Hubbard High School	Closed	Hubbard	Orange & Black
Jackson High School	Closed (2023)	Jackson	Irish

== Dawes County ==
School Name	District / Status	City	Mascot	2024-2025 Enrollment	2024-2025 Diversity(%)
Chadron High School	Chadron Public Schools	Chadron	Cardinals	242	20.66%
Crawford High School	Crawford Public Schools	Crawford	Rams	47	10.64%

=== Defunct schools ===
School Name	District / Status	City	Mascot
Whitney High School	Closed (1943)	Whitney	Mustangs

== Dawson County ==
School Name	District / Status	City	Mascot	2024-2025 Enrollment	2024-2025 Diversity(%)
Cozad High School	Cozad City Schools	Cozad	Haymakers	248	30.65%
Gothenburg High School	Gothenburg Public Schools	Gothenburg	Swedes	238	11.34%
Lexington High School	Lexington Public Schools	Lexington	Minutemen	915	87.65%
Overton High School	Overton Public Schools	Overton	Eagles	87	16.09%
Sumner-Eddyville-Miller High School	Sumner-Eddyville-Miller Schools	Sumner	Mustangs	69	20.29%

=== Defunct schools ===
School Name	District / Status	City	Mascot
Eddyville High School	Closed (1964)	Eddyville	Cardinals
Farnam High School	Closed (1997)	Farnam	Greenbacks

== Deuel County ==
School Name	District / Status	City	Mascot	2024-2025 Enrollment	2024-2025 Diversity(%)
Creek Valley High School	Creek Valley Schools	Chappell	Storm	53	5.66%
South Platte High School	South Platte Public Schools	Big Springs	Blue Knights	69	18.84%

== Dixon County ==
School Name	District / Status	City	Mascot	2024-2025 Enrollment	2024-2025 Diversity(%)
Allen High School	Allen Consolidated Schools	Allen	Eagles	42	11.90%
Ponca High School	Ponca Public Schools	Ponca	Indians	127	8.66%

=== Defunct schools ===
School Name	District / Status	City	Mascot
Concord High School	Closed	Concord	Vikings
Dixon High School	Closed	Dixon	Fighting Irish
Maskell High School	Closed	Maskell	
Newcastle High School	Closed	Newcastle	Raiders
Waterbury High School	Closed	Waterbury	Broncos

== Dodge County ==
School Name	District / Status	City	Mascot	2024-2025 Enrollment	2024-2025 Diversity(%)
Archbishop Bergan High School	Private (Catholic)	Fremont	Knights	127	10.24%
Fremont High School	Fremont Public Schools	Fremont	Tigers	1,677	51.04%
Logan View High School	Logan View Public Schools	Hooper	Raiders	173	9.25%
North Bend Central High School	North Bend Central Schools	North Bend	Tigers	174	6.32%
Scribner-Snyder High School	Scribner-Snyder Community Schools	Scribner	Trojans	47	21.28%

=== Defunct schools ===
School Name	District / Status	City	Mascot
Dodge High School	Closed (2012)	Dodge	Pirates
Nickerson High School	Closed	Nickerson	
Snyder High School	Closed	Snyder	Warriors

== Douglas County ==
School Name	District / Status	City	Mascot	2024-2025 Enrollment	2024-2025 Diversity(%)
Bennington High School	Bennington Public Schools	Bennington	Badgers	1,068	16.39%
Boys Town High School	Private (Non-Denominational)	Boys Town	Cowboys	268	58.96%
Brownell-Talbot School	Private (Non-Denominational)	Omaha	Raiders	151	40.40%
Concordia Lutheran High School	Private (Lutheran)	Omaha	Mustangs	292	11.99%
Creighton Preparatory School ^{[1]}	Private (Catholic)	Omaha	Bluejays	1,015	30.54%
Duchesne Academy ^{[2]}	Private (Catholic)	Omaha	Cardinals	318	27.36%
Elkhorn High School	Elkhorn Public Schools	Omaha	Antlers	769	58.17%
Elkhorn North High School	Elkhorn Public Schools	Omaha	Wolves	1,050	24.95%
Elkhorn South High School	Elkhorn Public Schools	Omaha	Storm	1,434	15.69%
Douglas County West High School	Douglas County West Community Schools	Valley	Falcons	326	11.04%
Marian High School ^{[2]}	Private (Catholic)	Omaha	Crusaders	633	23.54%
Mercy High School ^{[2]}	Private (Catholic)	Omaha	Monarchs	292	38.36%
Millard North High School	Millard Public Schools	Omaha	Mustangs	2,572	31.73%
Millard South High School	Millard Public Schools	Omaha	Patriots	2,526	33.33%
Millard West High School	Millard Public Schools	Omaha	Wildcats	2,344	19.07%
Mount Michael Benedictine School ^{[1]}	Private (Catholic)	Omaha	Knights	175	10.29%
NCYF Community High School		Omaha		17	76.47%
Omaha Benson High School	Omaha Public Schools	Omaha	Bunnies	1,488	86.16%
Omaha Buena Vista High School	Omaha Public Schools	Omaha	Bison	1,494	85.61%
Omaha Burke High School	Omaha Public Schools	Omaha	Bulldogs	1,693	66.98%
Omaha Central High School	Omaha Public Schools	Omaha	Eagles	2,587	74.80%
Omaha Christian Academy	Private (Non-Denominational)	Omaha	Eagles	73	21.92%
Omaha North High School	Omaha Public Schools	Omaha	Vikings	1,754	81.36%
Omaha Northwest High School	Omaha Public Schools	Omaha	Huskies	1,517	80.36%
Omaha South High School	Omaha Public Schools	Omaha	Packers	2,412	93.86%
Omaha Street School	Omaha Public Schools	Omaha		32	100%
Omaha Westview High School	Omaha Public Schools	Omaha	Wolverines	1,573	56.83%
Quest Forward High School	Private (Non-Denominational)	Omaha	Swarm	68	47.06%
Ralston High School	Ralston Public Schools	Ralston	Rams	1,024	57.81%
Roncalli Catholic High School^{[3]}	Private (Catholic)	Omaha	Crimson Pride	299	28.43%
Skutt High School	Private (Catholic)	Omaha	Skyhawks	740	12.16%
Westside High School	Westside Community Schools	Omaha	Warriors	2,145	34.50%

1. School with a focus on male education.
2. School with a focus on female education.
3. Formerly known as the Rummel Rebels/Raiders prior to consolidation with Notre Dame Academy.

=== Defunct schools ===
School Name	District / Status	City	Mascot
Archbishop Ryan High School	Closed	Omaha	Knights
Cathedral High School	Closed	Omaha	Cardinals
Dominican High School	Closed	Omaha	Friars
Notre Dame Academy	Closed (1974)	Omaha	
Omaha Beveridge High School	Closed	Omaha	Bulldogs
Omaha Tech High School	Closed (1984)	Omaha	Trojans
St. Joseph/Paul VI High School	Closed	Omaha	Hawks

== Dundy County ==
School Name	District / Status	City	Mascot	2024-2025 Enrollment	2024-2025 Diversity(%)
Dundy County-Stratton High School	Dundy County Public Schools	Benkelman	Tigers	88	20.45%

=== Defunct schools ===
School Name	District / Status	City	Mascot
Haigler High School	Closed (1984)	Haigler	Eagles

== Fillmore County ==
School Name	District / Status	City	Mascot	2024-2025 Enrollment	2024-2025 Diversity(%)
Fillmore Central High School	Fillmore Central Public Schools	Geneva	Panthers^{[3]}	175	15.43%
Shickley High School	Shickley Public Schools	Shickley	Longhorns; Eagles(Co-Op)^{[4]}	39	10.25%

1. Exeter-Milligan will consolidate with Saline County’s Friend High School in 2025 to become Exeter-Milligan-Friend High School.
2. Formerly known as the Exeter Eagles prior to consolidation with Milligan in 2003.
3. Formerly known as the Geneva Wildcats prior to consolidation with Fairmont in 1970.
4. Shickley is part of the BDS Eagles athletic Co-Op with Bruning-Davenport High School.

=== Defunct schools ===
School Name	District / Status	City	Mascot
Fairmont High School	Closed (1970)	Fairmont	Tigers
Grafton High School	Closed (1956)	Grafton	Gophers
Milligan High School	Closed (2003)	Milligan	Roosters
Ohiowa High School	Closed (1982)	Ohiowa	Bulldogs
Strang Public School	Closed (1951)	Strang	

== Franklin County ==
School Name	District / Status	City	Mascot	2024-2025 Enrollment	2024-2025 Diversity(%)
Franklin High School	Franklin Public Schools	Franklin	Flyers	77	3.90%

=== Defunct schools ===
School Name	District / Status	City	Mascot
Bloomington High School	Closed	Bloomington	Wampus Cats
Campbell High School	Closed	Campbell	Cardinals
Hildreth High School	Closed	Hildreth	Greyhounds
Naponee High School	Closed	Naponee	Chiefs
Riverton High School	Closed	Riverton	Bulldogs
Upland High School	Closed	Upland	Longhorns

== Frontier County ==
School Name	District / Status	City	Mascot	2024-2025 Enrollment	2024-2025 Diversity(%)
Eustis-Farnam High School	Eustis-Farnam Public Schools	Eustis	Knights	43	6.98%
Maywood High School	Maywood Public Schools	Maywood	Wolves	58	10.34%
Medicine Valley High School	Medicine Valley Public Schools	Curtis	Raiders	57	15.79%

=== Defunct schools ===
School Name	District / Status	City	Mascot
Moorefield High School	Closed	Moorefield	Longhorns
Stockville High School	Closed	Stockville	Bluejays

== Furnas County ==
School Name	District / Status	City	Mascot	2024-2025 Enrollment	2024-2025 Diversity(%)
Arapahoe High School	Arapahoe Public Schools	Arapahoe	Warriors	97	9.28%
Cambridge High School	Cambridge Public Schools	Cambridge	Trojans	81	4.94%
Southern Valley High School	Southern Valley Schools	Oxford	Eagles^{[1]}	102	11.76%

1. Formerly known as the Oxford Cardinals prior to consolidation.

=== Defunct schools ===
School Name	District / Status	City	Mascot
Beaver City High School	Closed	Beaver City	Bearcats
Edison High School	Closed	Edison	Eagles
Hendley High School	Closed	Hendley	
Holbrook High School	Closed	Holbrook	Hornets
Wilsonville High School	Closed	Wilsonville	Wildcats

== Gage County ==
School Name	District / Status	City	Mascot	2024-2025 Enrollment	2024-2025 Diversity(%)
Beatrice High School	Beatrice Public Schools	Beatrice	Orangemen	627	39.40%
Diller-Odell Secondary School	Diller-Odell Public Schools	Odell	Griffins^{[1]}	68	5.88%
Freeman High School	Freeman Public Schools	Adams	Falcons^{[2]}	143	2.10%
Southern High School	Southern School District 1	Wymore	Raiders^{[3]}	109	11.93%

1. Formerly known as the Odell Tigers prior to consolidation.
2. Formerly known as the Adams Hornets prior to consolidation.
3. Formerly known as the Wymore Zephyrs prior to consolidation.

=== Defunct schools ===
School Name	District / Status	City	Mascot
Barneston High School	Closed	Barneston	Indians
Beatrice St Joseph High School	Closed	Beatrice	Red Ravens
Blue Springs High School	Closed	Blue Springs	Bluejays
Clatonia High School	Closed	Clatonia	Cardinals
Cortland High School	Closed	Cortland	Raiders
Filley High School	Closed	Filley	Wildcats
Holmesville High School	Closed	Holmesville	Tigers
Liberty High School	Closed	Liberty	Mustangs
Virginia High School	Closed	Virginia	Pirates

== Garden County ==
School Name	District / Status	City	Mascot	2024-2025 Enrollment	2024-2025 Diversity(%)
Garden County High School	Garden County Schools	Oshkosh	Eagles	60	16.67%

=== Defunct schools ===
School Name	District / Status	City	Mascot
Lewellen High School	Closed	Lewellen	Tigers

== Garfield County ==
School Name	District / Status	City	Mascot	2024-2025 Enrollment	2024-2025 Diversity(%)
Burwell High School	Burwell Public Schools	Burwell	Longhorns	79	1.27%

== Gosper County ==
School Name	District / Status	City	Mascot	2024-2025 Enrollment	2024-2025 Diversity(%)
Elwood High School	Elwood Public Schools	Elwood	Pirates	57	15.79%

=== Defunct schools ===
School Name	District / Status	City	Mascot
Smithfield High School	Closed	Smithfield	Bulldogs

== Grant County ==
School Name	District / Status	City	Mascot	2024-2025 Enrollment	2024-2025 Diversity(%)
Hyannis High School	Hyannis Area Schools	Hyannis	Longhorns	39	5.13%

=== Defunct schools ===
School Name	District / Status	City	Mascot
Ashby High School	Closed	Ashby	Indians
Whitman High School	Closed	Whitman	Purple & Gold

== Greeley County ==
School Name	District / Status	City	Mascot	2024-2025 Enrollment	2024-2025 Diversity(%)
Central Valley High School	Central Valley Public Schools	Greeley	Cougars^{[1]}	93	5.38%
Spalding Academy	Private (Catholic)	Spalding	Shamrocks	15	0.00%

1. Formerly known as the Greeley Bulldogs prior to consolidation.

=== Defunct schools ===
School Name	District / Status	City	Mascot
Greeley Sacred Heart High School	Closed	Greeley	Irish
Scotia High School	Closed	Scotia	Tigers
Wolbach High School	Closed	Wolbach	Mustangs

== Hall County ==
School Name	District / Status	City	Mascot	2024-2025 Enrollment	2024-2025 Diversity(%)
Central Catholic High School	Private (Catholic)	Grand Island	Crusaders	186	28.49%
Doniphan-Trumbull Secondary School	Doniphan-Trumbull Public Schools	Doniphan	Cardinals	156	6.41%
Grand Island High School	Grand Island Public Schools	Grand Island	Islanders	2,696	70.47%
Grand Island Northwest High School	Northwest Public Schools	Grand Island	Vikings	680	17.50%
Heartland Lutheran High School	Private (Lutheran)	Grand Island	Huskies	58	3.45%
Wood River High School	Wood River Rural Schools	Wood River	Eagles	145	23.45%

=== Defunct schools ===
School Name	District / Status	City	Mascot
Alda High School	Closed	Alda	Red & White
Cairo High School	Closed	Cairo	Redskins
Grand Island St Mary’s High School	Closed	Grand Island	Ramblers

== Hamilton County ==
School Name	District / Status	City	Mascot	2024-2025 Enrollment	2024-2025 Diversity(%)
Aurora High School	Aurora Public Schools	Aurora	Huskies	382	10.73%
Giltner High School	Giltner Public Schools	Giltner	Hornets	59	10.17%
Hampton High School	Hampton Public Schools	Hampton	Hawks	43	4.65%

=== Defunct schools ===
School Name	District / Status	City	Mascot
Hordville High School	Closed	Hordville	Bulldogs
Marquette High School	Closed	Marquette	Cubs
Phillips High School	Closed	Phillips	Pirates
Stockham High School	Closed	Stockham	Red & White

== Harlan County ==
School Name	District / Status	City	Mascot	2024-2025 Enrollment	2024-2025 Diversity(%)
Alma High School	Alma Public Schools	Alma	Cardinals	124	6.45%

=== Defunct schools ===
School Name	District / Status	City	Mascot
Huntley High School	Closed	Huntley	Bearcats
Mascot High School	Closed	Mascot	Eagles
Orleans High School	Closed	Orleans	Orioles
Ragan High School	Closed	Ragan	Broncos
Republican City High School	Closed	Republican City	Warriors
Stamford High School	Closed	Stamford	Bulldogs

== Hayes County ==
School Name	District / Status	City	Mascot	2024-2025 Enrollment	2024-2025 Diversity(%)
Hayes Center High School	Hayes Center Public Schools	Hayes Center	Wolves	42	28.57%

=== Defunct schools ===
School Name	District / Status	City	Mascot
Hamlet High School	Closed	Hamlet	Trojans

== Hitchcock County ==
School Name	District / Status	City	Mascot	2024-2025 Enrollment	2024-2025 Diversity(%)
Hitchcock County High School	Hitchcock County Unified School System	Trenton	Falcons	69	8.70%

=== Defunct schools ===
School Name	District / Status	City	Mascot
Culbertson High School	Closed	Culbertson	Yellow Jackets; Bears
Palisade High School	Closed	Palisade	Panthers
Stratton High School	Closed	Stratton	Bulldogs

== Holt County ==
School Name	District / Status	City	Mascot	2024-2025 Enrollment	2024-2025 Diversity(%)
Chambers High School	Chambers Public Schools	Chambers	Coyotes	26	3.85%
O'Neill High School	O’Neill Public Schools	O’Neill	Eagles	210	16.67%
St. Mary's High School	Private (Catholic)	O’Neill	Cardinals	51	1.96%
Stuart High School	Stuart Public Schools	Stuart	Broncos	58	5.17%
West Holt High School	West Holt Public Schools	Atkinson	Huskies^{[1]}	147	9.52%

1. Formerly known as the Atkinson Haybalers prior to consolidation.

=== Defunct schools ===
School Name	District / Status	City	Mascot	2024-2025 Enrollment	2024-2025 Diversity(%)
Atkinson St. Joseph's High School	Closed	Atkinson	Bluejays		
Inman High School	Closed	Inman	Tigers		
Page High School	Closed	Page	Eagles		

== Hooker County ==
School Name	District / Status	City	Mascot	2024-2025 Enrollment	2024-2025 Diversity(%)
Mullen High School	Mullen Public Schools	Mullen	Broncos	45	2.22%

== Howard County ==
School Name	District / Status	City	Mascot	2024-2025 Enrollment	2024-2025 Diversity(%)
Centura Public School	Centura Public Schools	Cairo	Centurions	126	10.32%
Elba High School	Elba Public Schools	Elba	Bluejays	38	2.63%
St. Paul High School	St. Paul Public Schools	St. Paul	Wildcats	183	6.01%

=== Defunct schools ===
School Name	District / Status	City	Mascot
Boelus High School	Closed	Boelus	Bears
Cotesfield High School	Closed	Cotesfield	
Cushing High School	Closed	Cushing	Hawks
Dannebrog High School	Closed	Dannebrog	Eagles
Farwell High School	Closed	Farwell	Panthers

== Jefferson County ==
School Name	District / Status	City	Mascot	2024-2025 Enrollment	2024-2025 Diversity(%)
Fairbury High School	Fairbury Public Schools	Fairbury	Jeffs	250	17.20%
Meridian High School	Meridian Public Schools	Daykin	Mustangs^{[1]}	68	13.24%
Tri County High School	Tri-County Public Schools	DeWitt	Trojans	118	7.63%

1. Formerly known as the Daykin Hawks prior to consolidation.

=== Defunct schools ===
School Name	District / Status	City	Mascot
Diller High School	Closed	Diller	Eagles
Endicott High School	Closed	Endicott	Redbirds
Plymouth High School	Closed	Plymouth	Pilgrims
Reynolds High School	Closed	Reynolds	Tigers
Steele City High School	Closed	Steel City	Bulldogs

== Johnson County ==
School Name	District / Status	City	Mascot	2024-2025 Enrollment	2024-2025 Diversity(%)
Johnson County Central High School	Johnson County Central Public Schools	Tecumseh	Thunderbirds	166	24.70%
Sterling High School	Sterling Public Schools	Sterling	Jets	55	10.91%

=== Defunct schools ===
School Name	District / Status	City	Mascot
Cook High School	Closed	Cook	Cougars
Crab Orchard High School	Closed	Crab Orchard	
Elk Creek High School	Closed	Elk Creek	Antlers
Vesta High School	Closed	Vesta	Blue & White

== Kearney County ==
School Name	District / Status	City	Mascot	2024-2025 Enrollment	2024-2025 Diversity(%)
Axtell High School	Axtell Public Schools	Axtell	Wildcats	86	8.14%
Minden High School	Minden Public Schools	Minden	Whippets	272	13.60%
Wilcox-Hildreth High School	Wilcox-Hildreth Public Schools	Wilcox	Falcons	76	5.26%

=== Defunct schools ===
School Name	District / Status	City	Mascot
Heartwell High School	Closed	Heartwell	Bulldogs
Lowell High School	Closed	Lowell	
Newark High School	Closed	Newark	
Norman High School	Closed	Norman	Orange & Black

== Keith County ==
School Name	District / Status	City	Mascot	2024-2025 Enrollment	2024-2025 Diversity(%)
Ogallala High School	Ogallala Public Schools	Ogallala	Indians	237	17.72%
Paxton High School	Paxton Consolidated Schools	Paxton	Tigers	75	18.67%

=== Defunct schools ===
School Name	District / Status	City	Mascot
Brule High School	Closed	Brule	Huskies
Keystone High School	Closed	Keystone	Blue & Orange

== Keya Paha County ==
=== Defunct schools ===
School Name	District / Status	City	Mascot	2024-2025 Enrollment	2024-2025 Diversity(%)
Keya Paha County High School	Closed	Springview	Knights	28	3.57%

== Kimball County ==
School Name	District / Status	City	Mascot	2024-2025 Enrollment	2024-2025 Diversity(%)
Kimball High School	Kimball Public Schools	Kimball	Longhorns	113	14.16%

=== Defunct schools ===
School Name	District / Status	City	Mascot
Bushnell High School	Closed	Bushnell	Bulldogs
Dix High School	Closed	Dix	Panthers

== Knox County ==
School Name	District / Status	City	Mascot	2024-2025 Enrollment	2024-2025 Diversity(%)
Bloomfield High School	Bloomfield Community Schools	Bloomfield	Bees	94	14.89%
Creighton High School	Creighton Public Schools	Creighton	Bulldogs	88	7.95%
Crofton High School	Crofton Community Schools	Crofton	Warriors	134	3.73%
Niobrara High School	Niobrara Public Schools	Niobrara	Tigers; Cougars^{[1]}	49	63.27%
Santee High School	Santee Community Schools	Santee	Warriors	39	100%
Verdigre High School	Verdigre Public Schools	Verdigre	Hornets; Cougars^{[2]}	52	13.46%
Wausa High School	Wausa Public Schools	Wausa	Vikings	75	5.33%

1. Niobrara is a part of the Niobrara Verdigre Cougars athletic Co-Op with Verdigre High School.
2. Verdigre is a part of the Niobrara Verdigre Cougars athletic Co-Op with Niobrara High School.

=== Defunct schools ===
School Name	District / Status	City	Mascot
Center High School	Closed	Center	Panthers
Verdel High School	Closed	Verdel	Wildcats
Winnetoon High School	Closed	Winnetoon	Wildcats

== Lancaster County ==
School Name	District	City	Mascot	2024-2025 Enrollment	2024-2025 Diversity(%)
College View Academy	Private (Non-Denominational)	Lincoln	Eagles	74	43.24%
Lincoln East High School	Lincoln Public Schools	Lincoln	Spartans	1,982	23.31%
Lincoln Christian School	Private (Non-Denominational)	Lincoln	Crusaders	245	9.39%
Lincoln High School	Lincoln Public Schools	Lincoln	Links	2,088	59.96%
Lincoln Lutheran Middle/High School	Private (Lutheran)	Lincoln	Warriors	180	10.56%
Lincoln Northeast High School	Lincoln Public Schools	Lincoln	Rockets	1,819	44.97%
Lincoln North Star High School	Lincoln Public Schools	Lincoln	Gators	1,927	50.39%
Lincoln Northwest High School	Lincoln Public Schools	Lincoln	Falcons	1,017	43.66%
Lincoln Southeast High School	Lincoln Public Schools	Lincoln	Knights	1,848	33.01%
Lincoln Southwest High School	Lincoln Public Schools	Lincoln	Silver Hawks	2,110	26.73%
Malcolm Junior/Senior High School	Malcolm Public Schools	Malcolm	Clippers	204	6.37%
Norris High School	Norris School District	Firth	Titans	736	8.97%
Parkview Christian School	Private (Non-Denominational)	Lincoln	Patriots	68	50.00%
Pius X High School	Private (Catholic)	Lincoln	Thunderbolts	1,036	22.10%
Raymond Central High School	Raymond Central Public Schools	Raymond	Mustangs	237	8.86%
Standing Bear High School	Lincoln Public Schools	Lincoln	Grizzlies	631	19.33%
Waverly High School	Waverly School District	Waverly	Vikings	679	82.03%
University of Nebraska High School	University of Nebraska System	Lincoln		163	1.84%

=== Defunct schools ===
School Name	District	City	Mascot
Bennet High School	Closed (1965) ^{[1]}	Bennet	Aces
Bethany High School	Closed (1941) ^{[2]}	Bethany	Bearcats
Denton High School	Closed (1949)^{[3]}	Denton	Orange & Black
Firth High School	Closed (1964) ^{[4]}	Firth	Wildcats
Hallam High School	Closed (1968) ^{[5]}	Hallam	Hustlers
Havelock High School	Closed (1941) ^{[2]}	Havelock	Boilermakers; Engineers
Hickman High School	Closed (1964) ^{[4]}	Hickman	Bulldogs
Jackson High School	Closed (1941) ^{[2]}	University Place	Cardinals
Panama High School	Closed (1965) ^{[6]}	Panama	Panthers
Roca High School	Closed(1964) ^{[4]}	Roca	Ramblers; Rockets
Rokeby High School	Closed (1949)^{[3]}	Rokeby	Rustlers
Sprague-Martell High School	Closed(1967) ^{[7]}	Sprague	Panthers
Walton High School	Closed(1966)^{[8]}	Walton	Ponies

1. Bennet was consolidated into Palmyra High School in 1965.
2. Bethany, Havelock, & Jackson were consolidated into Lincoln Northeast in 1941.
3. Denton & Rokeby were consolidated into Sprague-Martell in 1949.
4. Firth, Hickman, & Roca consolidated into Norris High School in 1964.
5. Hallam was consolidated into Crete High School in 1968.
6. Panama was consolidated into Norris High School in 1965.
7. Sprague-Martell was consolidated into Norris High School in 1967.
8. Walton was consolidated into Waverly High in 1966.

== Lincoln County ==
School Name	District / Status	City	Mascot	2024-2025 Enrollment	2024-2025 Diversity(%)
Brady High School	Brady Public Schools	Brady	Eagles	73	9.59%
Hershey High School	Hershey Public Schools	Hershey	Panthers	157	8.28%
Maxwell High School	Maxwell Public Schools	Maxwell	Wildcats	97	21.65%
North Platte High School	North Platte Public Schools	North Platte	Bulldogs	1,145	22.88%
St. Patrick High School	Private (Catholic)	North Platte	Irish	105	19.05%
Sutherland High School	Sutherland Public Schools	Sutherland	Sailors	82	13.41%
Wallace High School	Wallace Public School District	Wallace	Wildcats	51	17.65%

=== Defunct schools ===
School Name	District / Status	City	Mascot
Dickens High School	Closed	Dickens	Blue & White
Wellfleet High School	Closed	Wellfleet	

== Logan County ==
School Name	District / Status	City	Mascot	2024-2025 Enrollment	2024-2025 Diversity(%)
Stapleton High School	Stapleton Public Schools	Stapleton	Broncos; Mavericks^{[1]}	53	20.75%

1. Stapleton is a part of the Sandhills Valley Mavericks athletic Co-Op with McPherson County High School.

=== Defunct schools ===
School Name	District / Status	City	Mascot	2024-2025 Enrollment	2024-2025 Diversity(%)
Gandy High School	Closed	Gandy	Streamliners		

== Loup County ==
=== Defunct schools ===
School Name	District / Status	City	Mascot
Taylor High School	Closed	Taylor	Wildcats

There are no longer any active high schools in Loup County. High school students from the County attend Twin Loup High School in Sargent.

== Madison County ==
School Name	District / Status	City	Mascot	2024-2025 Enrollment	2024-2025 Diversity(%)
Battle Creek High School	Battle Creek Public Schools	Battle Creek	Braves	196	6.63%
Elkhorn Valley High School	Elkhorn Valley Schools	Tilden	Falcons	125	12.00%
Lutheran High School Northeast	Private (Lutheran)	Norfolk	Eagles	124	7.26%
Madison High School	Madison Public Schools	Madison	Dragons	162	79.63%
Newman Grove High School	Newman Grove Public Schools	Newman Grove	Bluejays	47	6.38%
Norfolk Catholic High School	Private (Catholic)	Norfolk	Knights	155	14.84%
Norfolk High School	Norfolk Public Schools	Norfolk	Panthers	1,359	38.93%

=== Defunct schools ===
School Name	District / Status	City	Mascot
Meadow Grove High School	Closed	Meadow Grove	Trojans

== McPherson County ==
School Name	District / Status	City	Mascot	2024-2025 Enrollment	2024-2025 Diversity(%)
McPherson County High School	McPherson County Schools	Tryon	Knights; Mavericks^{[1]}	32	0%

1. McPherson County is a part of the Sandhills Valley Mavericks athletic Co-Op with Stapleton High School.

== Merrick County ==
School Name	District / Status	City	Mascot	2024-2025 Enrollment	2024-2025 Diversity(%)
Central City High School	Central City Public Schools	Central City	Bison	243	7.82%
Nebraska Christian High School	Private (Non-Denominational)	Central City	Eagles	114	32.46%
Palmer High School	Palmer Public Schools	Palmer	Tigers	78	6.41%

=== Defunct schools ===
School Name	District / Status	City	Mascot
Archer High School	Closed	Archer	
Chapman High School	Closed	Chapman	Eagles
Silver Creek High School	Closed	Silver Creek	Tigers

== Morrill County ==
School Name	District / Status	City	Mascot	2024-2025 Enrollment	2024-2025 Diversity(%)
Bayard High School	Bayard Public Schools	Bayard	Tigers	96	29.17%
Bridgeport High School	Bridgeport Public Schools	Bridgeport	Bulldogs	173	25.43%

=== Defunct schools ===
School Name	District / Status	City	Mascot
Broadwater High School	Closed	Broadwater	Gorillas

== Nance County ==
School Name	District / Status	City	Mascot	2024-2025 Enrollment	2024-2025 Diversity(%)
Fullerton High School	Fullerton Public Schools	Fullerton	Warriors	86	3.49%
Twin River High School	Twin River Public Schools	Genoa	Titans	128	8.59%

=== Defunct schools ===
School Name	District / Status	City	Mascot
Belgrade High School	Closed	Belgrade	Cardinals

== Nemaha County ==
School Name	District / Status	City	Mascot	2024-2025 Enrollment	2024-2025 Diversity(%)
Auburn High School	Auburn Public Schools	Auburn	Bulldogs	258	6.20%
Johnson-Brock High School	Johnson-Brock Public Schools	Johnson	Eagles	118	2.54%

=== Defunct schools ===
School Name	District / Status	City	Mascot
Brock High School	Closed	Brock	Pirates
Brownville High School	Closed	Brownville	
Julian High School	Closed	Julian	
Nemaha High School	Closed	Nemaha	Indians
Peru Prep High School	Closed	Peru	Bobkittens

== Nuckolls County ==
School Name	District / Status	City	Mascot	2024-2025 Enrollment	2024-2025 Diversity(%)
Lawrence-Nelson High School	South Central Nebraska Unified System 5	Nelson	Raiders^{[1]}	69	5.80%
Superior High School	Superior Public Schools	Superior	Wildcats	126	8.73%

1. Formerly known as the Nelson Tigers prior to consolidation.

=== Defunct schools ===
School Name	District / Status	City	Mascot
Hardy High School	Closed	Hardy	Dragons
Lawrence High School	Closed	Lawrence	Panthers
Oak High School	Closed	Oak	
Nora High School	Closed	Nora	
Ruskin High School	Closed	Ruskin	Indians

== Otoe County ==
School Name	District / Status	City	Mascot	2024-2025 Enrollment	2024-2025 Diversity(%)
Lourdes Central Catholic High School	Catholic	Nebraska City	Knights	93	9.68%
Nebraska City High School	Nebraska City Public Schools	Nebraska City	Pioneers	442	28.73%
Palmyra High School	Palmyra District	Palmyra	Panthers	181	11.05%
Syracuse High School	Syracuse-Dunbar-Avoca Schools	Syracuse	Rockets	228	6.58%

1. Formerly known as the Berlin Wildcats prior to 1918.

=== Defunct schools ===
School Name	District / Status	City	Mascot
Burr High School	Closed	Burr	Cardinals
Douglas High School	Closed	Douglas	Eagles
Lorton High School	Closed	Lorton	
Otoe High School	Closed (1958)	Otoe^{[1]}	Wildcats
Talmage High School	Closed	Talmage	Bulldogs
Unadilla High School	Closed	Unadilla	Cardinals

== Pawnee County ==
School Name	District / Status	City	Mascot	2024-2025 Enrollment	2024-2025 Diversity(%)
Lewiston High School	Lewiston Consolidated Schools	Lewiston	Tigers	53	13.21%
Pawnee City High School	Pawnee City Public Schools	Pawnee City	Indians	76	2.63%

=== Defunct schools ===
School Name	District / Status	City	Mascot
Burchard High School	Closed	Burchard	Eagles
Du Bois High School	Closed	Du Bois	Lions
Steinauer High School	Closed	Steinauer	Bluejays
Table Rock High School	Closed	Table Rock	Tigers

== Perkins County ==
School Name	District / Status	City	Mascot	2024-2025 Enrollment	2024-2025 Diversity(%)
Perkins County High School	Perkins County Schools	Grant	Plainsmen	123	15.45%

=== Defunct schools ===
School Name	District / Status	City	Mascot
Elsie High School	Closed	Elsie	Bulldogs
Madrid High School	Closed	Madrid	Pirates
Venango High School	Closed	Venango	Panthers

== Phelps County ==
School Name	District / Status	City	Mascot	2024-2025 Enrollment	2024-2025 Diversity(%)
Bertrand High School	Bertrand Public Schools	Bertrand	Vikings	80	12.50%
Holdrege High School	Holdrege Public Schools	Holdrege	Dusters	337	16.91%
Loomis High School	Loomis Public Schools	Loomis	Wolves	79	12.66%

=== Defunct schools ===
School Name	District / Status	City	Mascot
Atlanta High School	Closed	Atlanta	Bluejays

== Pierce County ==
School Name	District / Status	City	Mascot	2024-2025 Enrollment	2024-2025 Diversity(%)
Osmond High School	Osmond Public Schools	Osmond	Tigers	56	3.57%
Pierce High School	Pierce Public Schools	Pierce	Bluejays	246	7.32%
Plainview High School	Plainview Public Schools	Plainview	Pirates	98	9.18%

=== Defunct schools ===
School Name	District / Status	City	Mascot
McLean High School	Closed	McLean	Wildcats

== Platte County ==
School Name	District / Status	City	Mascot	2024-2025 Enrollment	2024-2025 Diversity(%)
Archangels Catholic High School	Catholic	Humphrey	Defenders^{[1]}	56	0%
Columbus High School	Columbus Public Schools	Columbus	Discoverers	1,337	54.97%
Humphrey High School	Humphrey Public Schools	Humphrey	Bulldogs	92	2.17%
Lakeview High School	Lakeview Community Schools	Lakeview	Vikings	344	29.94%
Lindsay Academy	Catholic	Lindsay	Bulldogs	30	0%
Scotus Central Catholic High School	Catholic	Columbus	Shamrocks^{[2]}	254	12.99%

1. Formerly known as the St. Francis Flyers prior to consolidation with Lindsay Holy Family in 2024.
2. Formerly known as the St. Bonaventure Shamrocks.

=== Defunct schools ===
School Name	District / Status	City	Mascot
Creston High School	Closed	Creston	Ramblers
Duncan High School	Closed	Duncan	Bluejays
Lindsay Holy Family High School	Closed (2024)	Lindsay	Bulldogs
Monroe High School	Closed	Monroe	Mustangs
Platte Center High School	Closed	Platte Center	Explorers

== Polk County ==
School Name	District / Status	City	Mascot	2024-2025 Enrollment	2024-2025 Diversity(%)
Cross County High School	Cross County Community Schools	Stromsburg	Cougars^{[1]}	120	13.33%
High Plains High School	High Plains Community Schools	Polk	Storm^{[2]}	62	17.74%
Osceola High School	Osceola Public Schools	Osceola	Bulldogs	91	8.79%
Shelby-Rising City High School	Shelby-Rising City Public Schools	Shelby	Huskies	112	17.86%

1. Formerly known as the Stromsburg Vikings prior to consolidation.
2. Formerly known as the Polk Cubs and Polk-Hordville Wildcats prior to consolidation.

== Red Willow County ==
School Name	District / Status	City	Mascot	2024-2025 Enrollment	2024-2025 Diversity(%)
McCook High School	McCook Public Schools	McCook	Bison	448	10.94%
Southwest High School	Southwest Public Schools	Bartley	Roughriders	83	19.28%

=== Defunct schools ===
School Name	District / Status	City	Mascot
Danbury High School	Closed	Danbury	Pirates
Indianola High School	Closed	Indianola	

== Richardson County ==
School Name	District / Status	City	Mascot	2024-2025 Enrollment	2024-2025 Diversity(%)
Falls City High School	Falls City Public Schools	Falls City	Tigers	216	16.67%
Humboldt-Table Rock-Steinauer High School	Humboldt-Table Rock-Steinauer Public Schools	Humboldt	Titans	88	6.82%
Sacred Heart High School	Catholic	Falls City	Irish	57	10.53%

=== Defunct schools ===
School Name	District / Status	City	Mascot
Dawson High School	Closed	Dawson	Lions/Jets^{[1]}
Rulo High School	Closed	Rulo	Eagles
Salem High School	Closed	Salem	Bobcats
Shubert High School	Closed	Shubert	Panthers
Stella High School	Closed	Stella	Tigers/Mustangs^{[2]}
Verdon High School	Closed	Verdon	Bulldogs

1. Formerly known as the Dawson-Verdon Jets prior to consolidation.
2. Formerly known as the Southeast Nebraska Mustangs prior to consolidation.

== Rock County ==
School Name	District / Status	City	Mascot	2024-2025 Enrollment	2024-2025 Diversity(%)
Rock County High School	Rock County Schools	Bassett	Knights	61	0%

=== Defunct schools ===
School Name	District / Status	City	Mascot
Newport High School	Closed	Newport	Panthers

== Saline County ==
School Name	District / Status	City	Mascot	2024-2025 Enrollment	2024-2025 Diversity(%)
Crete High School	Crete Public Schools	Crete	Cardinals	705	67.66%
Dorchester High School	Dorchester Public Schools	Dorchester	Longhorns	89	67.42%
Friend High School	Friend Public Schools	Friend	Bulldogs^{[1]}	64	4.69%
Wilber-Clatonia High School	Wilber-Clatonia Public Schools	Wilber	Wolverines	183	15.85%

1. Friend will consolidate into Exeter-Milligan at the close of the 2025-2026 school year.

=== Defunct schools ===
School Name	District / Status	City	Mascot	2024-2025 Enrollment	2024-2025 Diversity(%)
DeWitt High School	Closed	DeWitt	Panthers		
Swanton High School	Closed	Swanton	Jackrabbits		
Tobias High School	Closed	Tobias	Tigers		
Western High School	Closed	Western	Indians		

== Sarpy County ==
School Name	District / Status	City	Mascot	2024-2025 Enrollment	2024-2025 Diversity(%)
Bellevue East High School	Bellevue Public Schools	Bellevue	Chieftains	1,420	41.20%
Bellevue West High School	Bellevue Public Schools	Bellevue	Thunderbirds	1,529	40.68%
Cornerstone Christian School	Private (Non-Denominational)	Bellevue	Cougars	127	14.96%
Daniel J. Gross Catholic High School	Private (Catholic)	Bellevue	Cougars	376	32.18%
Gretna High School	Gretna Public Schools	Gretna	Dragons	955	13.40%
Gretna East High School	Gretna Public Schools	Gretna	Griffins	1,009	14.07%
Omaha Bryan High School	Omaha Public Schools	Bellevue	Bears	1,474	87.79%
Papillion La Vista Senior High School	Papillion-La Vista Public Schools	Papillion	Monarchs	1,403	30.58%
Papillion-La Vista South High School	Papillion-La Vista Public Schools	Papillion	Titans	1,551	23.21%
IDEAL School	Papillion-La Vista Public Schools	Papillion		75	
Platteview Senior High School	Springfield Platteview Community Schools	Springfield	Trojans	387	10.59%

== Saunders County ==
School Name	District / Status	City	Mascot	2024-2025 Enrollment	2024-2025 Diversity(%)
Ashland-Greenwood High School	Ashland-Greenwood Schools	Ashland	Bluejays	322	11.80%
Bishop Neumann High School	Private (Catholic)	Wahoo	Cavaliers	169	2.37%
Cedar Bluffs High School	Cedar Bluffs Public Schools	Cedar Bluffs	Wildcats	121	14.05%
Mead High School	Mead Public Schools	Mead	Raiders	70	7.14%
Wahoo High School	Wahoo Public Schools	Wahoo	Warriors	341	11.44%
Yutan High School	Yutan Public Schools	Yutan	Chieftains	148	5.41%

=== Defunct schools ===
School Name	District / Status	City	Mascot
Ceresco High School	Closed	Ceresco	Eagles
Leshara High School	Closed	Leshara	
Malmo High School	Closed	Malmo	
Prague High School	Closed	Prague	Panthers
Valparaiso High School	Closed	Valparaiso	Bulldogs
Wann High School	Closed	Wann	
Weston High School	Closed	Weston	Bobcats

== Scotts Bluff County ==
School Name	District / Status	City	Mascot	2024-2025 Enrollment	2024-2025 Diversity(%)
Gering High School	Gering Public Schools	Gering	Bulldogs	546	35.71%
Minatare High School	Minatare Public Schools	Minatare	Indians	48	52.08%
Mitchell High School	Mitchell Public Schools	Mitchell	Tigers	182	21.98%
Morrill High School	Morrill Public Schools	Morrill	Lions	95	33.68%
Scottsbluff High School	Scottsbluff Public Schools	Scottsbluff	Bearcats	1,064	47.09%

=== Defunct schools ===
School Name	District / Status	City	Mascot
Henry High School	Closed	Henry	Broncos
Lyman High School	Closed	Lyman	Wildcats
McGrew High School	Closed	McGrew	Bobcats
Melbeta High School	Closed	Melbeta	Eagles

== Seward County ==
School Name	District / Status	City	Mascot	2024-2025 Enrollment	2024-2025 Diversity(%)
Centennial High School	Centennial Public Schools	Utica	Broncos^{[1]}	151	7.28%
Milford High School	Milford Public Schools	Milford	Eagles	247	9.72%
Seward High School	Seward Public Schools	Seward	Bluejays	511	7.63%

1. Formerly known as the Utica Tigers prior to consolidation.

=== Defunct schools ===
School Name	District / Status	City	Mascot
Beaver Crossing High School	Closed	Beaver Crossing	Beavers
Cordova High School	Closed	Cordova	Vikings
Garland High School	Closed	Garland	Panthers
Goehner High School	Closed	Goehner	Bulldogs
Pleasant Dale High School	Closed	Pleasant Dale	
Tamora High School	Closed	Tamora	

== Sheridan County ==
School Name	District / Status	City	Mascot	2024-2025 Enrollment	2024-2025 Diversity(%)
Gordon-Rushville High School	Gordon-Rushville Public Schools	Gordon	Mustangs		
Hay Springs High School	Hay Springs Public Schools	Hay Springs	Hawks		

=== Defunct schools ===
School Name	District / Status	City	Mascot
Antioch High School	Closed (1944)	Antioch	
Bingham High School	Closed (1956)	Bingham	Bulldogs
Clinton High School	Closed (1945)	Clinton	Cubs
Rushville High School	Closed (2005)	Rushville	Longhorns

== Sherman County ==
School Name	District / Status	City	Mascot	2024-2025 Enrollment	2024-2025 Diversity(%)
Litchfield High School	Litchfield Public Schools	Litchfield	Trojans	31	6.45%
Loup City High School	Loup City Public Schools	Loup City	Red Raiders; Rebels(Co-Op) ^{[1]}	77	10.39%

1. Loup City is a part of the ALC Rebels athletic Co-Op with Arcadia High School.

=== Defunct schools ===
School Name	District / Status	City	Mascot
Ashton High School	Closed (1968)	Ashton	Hawks
Hazard High School	Closed (1950)	Hazard	Wildcats
Rockwell High School	Closed (1965)	Rockwell	Tigers

== Sioux County ==
School Name	District / Status	City	Mascot	2024-2025 Enrollment	2024-2025 Diversity(%)
Sioux County High School	Sioux County Schools	Harrison	Warriors	24	29.17%

== Stanton County ==
School Name	District / Status	City	Mascot	2024-2025 Enrollment	2024-2025 Diversity(%)
Stanton High School	Stanton Community Schools	Stanton	Mustangs	121	12.40%

=== Defunct schools ===
School Name	District / Status	City	Mascot
Pilger High School	Closed (1968)	Pilger	Cardinals

== Thayer County ==
School Name	District / Status	City	Mascot	2024-2025 Enrollment	2024-2025 Diversity(%)
Bruning-Davenport High School	Bruning-Davenport Unified System	Bruning	Storm^{[1]} Eagles(Co-Op)^{[2]}	50	8.00%
Deshler High School	Deshler Public Schools	Deshler	Dragons	84	14.29%
Thayer Central High School	Thayer Central Community Schools	Hebron	Titans^{[3]}	142	4.23%

1. Formerly known as the Bruning Bears prior to consolidation with Davenport in 2000.
2. Bruning-Davenport is part of the BDS Eagles athletic Co-Op with Shickley High School.
3. Formerly known as the Hebron Bears prior to consolidation with Chester-Hubbell-Byron in 2002.

=== Defunct schools ===
School Name	District / Status	City	Mascot
Alexandria High School	Closed (1970)	Alexandria	Lions
Belvidere High School	Closed (1958)	Belvidere	Bobcats
Byron High School	Closed (1982)	Byron	Broncos
Carleton High School	Closed (1955)	Carleton	Warriors
Chester High School	Closed (2001)	Chester	Bulldogs
Davenport High School	Closed (2000)	Davenport	Tigers
Hubbell High School	Closed (1950)	Hubbell	

== Thomas County ==
School Name	District / Status	City	Mascot	2024-2025 Enrollment	2024-2025 Diversity(%)
Thedford High School	Thedford Public Schools	Thedford	Trojans; Knights(Co-Op)^{[1]}	34	14.71%

1. Thedford is part of the Sandhills Thedford Knights athletic Co-Op with Sandhills High School(Dunning).

=== Defunct schools ===
School Name	District / Status	City	Mascot
Halsey High School	Closed (1964)	Halsey	Hawks
Seneca High School	Closed (1954)	Seneca	Bulldogs

== Thurston County ==
School Name	District / Status	City	Mascot	2024-2025 Enrollment	2024-2025 Diversity(%)
Emerson-Hubbard High School	Emerson-Hubbard Public Schools	Emerson	Pirates; Wolfpack(Co-Op)^{[1]}	71	21.13%
Omaha Nation High School	Umo N Ho N Nation Public Schools	Macy	Chiefs	170	100%
Pender High School	Pender Public Schools	Pender	Pendragons	128	14.06%
Walthill High School	Walthill Public Schools	Walthill	Blujays	151	98.68%
Winnebago High School	Winnebago Public Schools	Winnebago	Indians	187	99.47%

1. Emerson-Hubbard is part of the Tri County Wolfpack athletic Co-Op with Allen Consolidated Schools.

=== Defunct schools ===
School Name	District / Status	City	Mascot
Rosalie High School	Closed (1982)	Rosalie	Bulldogs
Thurston High School	Closed (1967)	Thurston	Bluehawks

== Valley County ==
School Name	District / Status	City	Mascot	2024-2025 Enrollment	2024-2025 Diversity(%)
Arcadia High School	Arcadia Public Schools	Arcadia	Huskies; Rebels(Co-Op)^{[1]}	32	12.50%
Ord Junior-Senior High School	Ord Public Schools	Ord	Chanticleers	155	6.45%

1. Arcadia is a part of the ALC Rebels athletic Co-Op with Loup City High School.

=== Defunct schools ===
School Name	District / Status	City	Mascot
North Loup High School	Closed (1959)	North Loup	Challengers

== Washington County ==
School Name	District / Status	City	Mascot	2024-2025 Enrollment	2024-2025 Diversity(%)
Arlington High School	Arlington Public Schools	Arlington	Chanticleers	226	6.64%
Blair High School	Blair Community Schools	Blair	Bears	681	12.76%
Fort Calhoun High School	Fort Calhoun Community Schools	Fort Calhoun	Pioneers	258	6.98%

=== Defunct schools ===
School Name	District / Status	City	Mascot
Herman High School	Closed (1969)	Herman	Cardinals
Kennard High School	Closed (1960)	Kennard	Tigers

== Wayne County ==
School Name	District / Status	City	Mascot	2024-2025 Enrollment	2024-2025 Diversity(%)
Wakefield High School	Wakefield Public Schools	Wakefield	Trojans	158	62.66%
Wayne High School	Wayne Community Schools	Wayne	Blue Devils	66	30.30%
Winside High School	Winside Public Schools	Winside	Wildcats	65	9.23%

=== Defunct schools ===
School Name	District / Status	City	Mascot
Carroll High School	Closed (1958)	Carroll	Panthers
Hoskins High School	Closed (1958)	Hoskins	Huskies

== Webster County ==
School Name	District / Status	City	Mascot	2024-2025 Enrollment	2024-2025 Diversity(%)
Blue Hill High School	Blue Hill Public Schools	Blue Hill	Bobcats	92	6.52%
Red Cloud High School	Red Cloud Community Schools	Red Cloud	Warriors	75	18.67%

=== Defunct schools ===
School Name	District / Status	City	Mascot
Bladen High School	Closed (1986)	Bladen	Bulldogs
Cowles High School	Closed (1959)	Cowles	Tigers
Guide Rock High School	Closed (1998)	Guide Rock	Warriors
Inavale High School	Closed (1955)	Inavale	Panthers

== Wheeler County ==
School Name	District / Status	City	Mascot	2024-2025 Enrollment	2024-2025 Diversity(%)
Chambers-Wheeler Central High School	Wheeler Central Schools	Bartlett	Broncos	25	3.85%

=== Defunct schools ===
School Name	District / Status	City	Mascot
Ericson High School	Closed (1961)	Ericson	Vikings

== York County ==
School Name	District / Status	City	Mascot	2024-2025 Enrollment	2024-2025 Diversity(%)
Heartland Community High School	Heartland Community School	Henderson	Bulldogs	99	9.09%
McCool Junction Junior-Senior High School	McCool Junction Public Schools	McCool Junction	Mustangs	89	5.62%
Nebraska Lutheran High School	Private (Lutheran)	Waco	Knights	54	12.96%
York High School	York Public Schools	York	Dukes	498	21.69%

1. Lushton was consolidated into Heartland Community High School (Henderson) in 1947 or 1948.

=== Defunct schools ===
School Name	District / Status	City	Mascot
Benedict High School	Closed (2001)	Benedict	Eagles
Bradshaw High School	Closed (1998)	Bradshaw	Bulldogs
Gresham High School	Closed (1983)	Gresham	Blackbirds
Lushton High School	Closed (1947/1948)^{[1]}	Lushton	Green & White
Thayer High School	Closed (1962)	Thayer	Tigers
Waco High School	Closed (1967)	Waco	Warriors

== See also ==
- List of school districts in Nebraska
