= List of school districts in Nebraska =

The following is a list of school districts in Nebraska:

School districts in Nebraska are independent governments. No public school systems in Nebraska are dependent on other layers of government.

== Nebraska school district classification ==
Nebraska public school districts are divided into four classes:

- Class 3 (district has 1 to 499,999 inhabitants)
- Class 4 (district has more than 100,000 inhabitants in primary cities; Lincoln Public Schools is the only district in this class)
- Class 5 (district has more than 200,000 inhabitants in metropolitan cities; Omaha Public Schools is the only district in this class)

Three additional classes of Nebraska school districts, Class 1 (grades K-8; affiliated with one or more Class 2-5 districts and/or joined with a Class 6 district for tax purposes) and Class 6 (grades 6–12; was joined with one or more Class 1 districts) were dissolved on June 15, 2006, and Class 2 (district has 1,000 or fewer inhabitants) was dissolved in 2018.

All unlabeled districts on this list are class 3; others will be specified.

== History ==
The highest number of school districts the state ever had was over 7,000. In 1921 the state legislature passed a law that caused the first wave of school district consolidation. Increased highway transportation and a desire for a strong education in all parts of the state prompted more consolidations. After the law passed 5% of the area school districts closed or merged up to World War II. 6,604 school districts remained in the 1950-1951 school year.

Post-World War II de-ruralization meant that school district populations declined further, with a large number consolidated in the 1950s and 1960s.

In 1990 there were 812 school districts. In 2004 this was down to 501, and later that year the number of school districts went below 500.

== List of schools ==
- Valentine Community Schools
- Gordon-Rushville Public Schools
- Sioux County Public Schools
- Garden County Schools
- Hyannis Area Schools
- Mullen Public Schools
- Ainsworth Community Schools
- Dundy County Public Schools
- Rock County Public Schools
- Hemingford Public Schools
- Sandhills Public Schools
- West Holt Public Schools
- Alliance Public Schools
- McPherson County Schools
- Perkins County Schools
- Banner County Public Schools
- Keya Paha County Schools
- Chase County Schools
- Arthur County Schools
- Thedford Public Schools
- Chadron Public Schools
- Kimball Public Schools
- Bridgeport Public Schools
- Southwest Public Schools
- O'Neill Public Schools
- Wheeler Central Schools
- Stapleton Public Schools
- Nebraska Unified District
- Southern Valley Schools
- Creek Valley Schools
- Loup County Public Schools
- Cody-Kilgore Public Schools
- Burwell Public Schools
- Hayes Center Public Schools
- Leyton Public Schools
- Ogallala Public Schools
- Potter-Dix Public Schools
- South Central Nebraska School District
- Anselmo-Merna Public Schools
- Broken Bow Public Schools
- Wallace Public School District
- Arnold Public Schools
- Wauneta-Palisade Public Schools
- Ord Public Schools
- West Boyd Public Schools
- Callaway Public Schools
- Boone Central Schools
- Humboldt Table Rock Steinauer Public Schools
- Maywood Public Schools
- Hitchcock County School System
- Eustis-Farnam Public Schools
- Paxton Consolidated Schools
- Fairbury Public Schools
- Chambers Public Schools
- Loup City Public Schools
- Crawford Public Schools
- South Platte Public Schools
- Hershey Public Schools
- Minden Public Schools
- Franklin Public Schools
- Adams Central Public Schools
- Maxwell Public Schools
- Centennial Public Schools
- Gothenburg Public Schools
- Arapahoe Public Schools
- Medicine Valley Public Schools
- Sumner-Eddyville-Miller Schools
- Hay Springs Public Schools
- David City Public Schools
- Falls City Public Schools
- Schuyler Community Schools
- Sargent Public Schools
- Twin Rivers Public Schools
- Silver Lake Public Schools
- Greeley-Wolbach Public Schools
- Sidney Public Schools
- Sutherland Public Schools
- Johnson County Central Public Schools
- Wilcox-Hildreth Public Schools
- Thayer Central Community Schools

== ESU #1 ==
=== Cedar County ===
- Hartington-Newcastle Public Schools #8
- Laurel-Concord-Coleridge Public Schools #54
- Randolph Public Schools #45
- Wynot Public Schools #101

=== Dakota County ===
- Homer Community Schools #31
- South Sioux City Community Schools #11

=== Dixon County ===
- Allen Consolidated Schools #70
- Emerson-Hubbard Public Schools #561
- Ponca Public Schools #1

=== Knox County ===
- Bloomfield Community Schools #586
- Creighton Public Schools #13
- Crofton Community Schools #96
- Niobrara Public Schools #501
- Santee Community Schools #505
- Verdigre Public Schools #583
- Wausa Public Schools #576

=== Thurston County ===
- Pender Public Schools #1
- Umo N Ho N Nation Public Schools #16
- Walthill Public Schools #13
- Wauneta-Palisade Public Schools
- Winnebago Public Schools #17

=== Wayne County ===
- Wakefield Public Schools #560
- Wayne Community Schools #17
- Winside Public Schools #595

== ESU #2 ==
=== Burt County ===
- Lyons-Decatur Northeast Schools #20
- Oakland-Craig Public Schools #14
- Tekamah-Herman Community Schools #1

=== Cuming County ===
- Bancroft-Rosalie Community Schools #20
- West Point Public Schools #1
- Wisner-Pilger Public Schools #30

=== Dodge County ===
- Fremont Public Schools #1
- Logan View Public Schools #594
- North Bend Central Schools #595
- Scribner-Snyder Community Schools #62

=== Lancaster County ===
- Raymond Central Schools #161

=== Saunders County ===
- Ashland-Greenwood Schools #1
- Cedar Bluffs Public Schools #107
- Mead Public Schools #72
- Wahoo Public Schools #39
- Yutan Public Schools #9

== ESU #3 ==
=== Cass County ===
- Conestoga Public Schools #56
- Elmwood-Murdock Public Schools #97
- Louisville Public Schools #32
- Plattsmouth Community Schools #1
- Weeping Water Public Schools #22

=== Douglas County ===
- Bennington Public Schools #59
- Douglas County West Community Schools #15
- Elkhorn Public Schools #10
- Millard Public Schools #17
- Ralston Public Schools #54
- Westside Community Schools #66

=== Sarpy County ===
- Bellevue Public Schools #1
- Gretna Public Schools #37
- Papillion-La Vista Public Schools #27
- Springfield Platteview Community Schools #46

=== Washington County ===
- Arlington Public Schools #24
- Blair Community Schools #1
- Fort Calhoun Community Schools #3

== ESU #4 ==
=== Johnson County ===
- Johnson County Central Public Schools #50
- Sterling Public Schools #33

=== Nemaha County ===
- Auburn Public Schools #29
- Johnson-Brock Public Schools #23

=== Otoe County ===
- Nebraska City Public Schools #11
- Palmyra District #501
- Syracuse-Dunbar-Avoca Schools #27

=== Pawnee County ===
- Lewiston Consolidated Schools #69
- Pawnee City Public Schools #1

=== Richardson County ===
- Falls City Public Schools #56
- Humboldt/Table Rock Steinauer #70

== ESU #5 ==
=== Gage County ===
- Beatrice Public Schools #15
- Diller-Odell Public Schools #100
- Freeman Public Schools #34
- Southern School District 1

=== Jefferson County ===
- Fairbury Public Schools #8
- Meridian Public Schools #303
- Tri-County Public Schools #300

=== Thayer County ===
- Bruning-Davenport Unified System #1
- Deshler Public Schools #60
- Thayer Central Community Schools #70

== ESU #6 ==
=== Fillmore County ===
- Exeter-Milligan Public Schools #1
- Fillmore Central Public Schools #25
- Shickley Public Schools #54

=== Lancaster County ===
- Malcolm Public Schools #148
- Norris School District 160
- Waverly School District 145

=== Saline County ===
- Crete Public Schools #2
- Dorchester Public Schools #44
- Friend Public Schools #68
- Wilber-Clatonia Public Schools #82

=== Seward County ===
- Centennial Public Schools #567
- Milford Public Schools #5
- Seward Public Schools #9

=== York County ===
- Heartland Community School #96
- McCool Junction Public Schools #83
- York Public Schools #12

== ESU #7 ==
=== Boone County ===
- Boone Central Schools #1
- St. Edward Public Schools #17

=== Butler County ===
- David City Public Schools #56
- East Butler Public Schools #502

=== Colfax County ===
- Clarkson Public Schools #58
- Howells-Dodge Consolidated Schools #70
- Leigh Community Schools #39
- Schuyler Community Schools #123

=== Merrick County ===
- Central City Public Schools #4
- Palmer Public Schools #49

=== Nance County ===
- Fullerton Public Schools #1
- Twin River Public Schools #30

=== Platte County ===
- Columbus Public Schools #1
- Humphrey Public Schools #67
- Lakeview Community Schools #5

=== Polk County ===
- Cross County Community Schools #15
- High Plains Community Schools #75
- Osceola Public Schools #19
- Shelby-Rising City Public Schools #32

== ESU #8 ==
=== Antelope County ===
- Elgin Public Schools #18
- Neligh-Oakdale Schools #9
- Summerland Public Schools #115

=== Boyd County ===
- Boyd County Unified #51

=== Holt County ===
- Chambers Public Schools #137
- O'Neill Public Schools #7
- Stuart Public Schools #44
- Summerland Public Schools
- West Holt Public Schools #239

=== Madison County ===
- Battle Creek Public Schools #5
- Elkhorn Valley Schools #80
- Madison Public Schools #1
- Newman Grove Public Schools #13
- Norfolk Public Schools #2

=== Pierce County ===
- Osmond Public Schools #542
- Pierce Public Schools #2
- Plainview Public Schools #5

=== Stanton County ===
- Stanton Community Schools #3

=== Wheeler County ===
- Wheeler Central Schools #45

== ESU #9 ==
=== Adams County ===
- Adams Central Schools #90
- Hastings Public Schools #18
- Kenesaw Public Schools #3
- Silver Lake Public Schools #123

=== Clay County ===
- Harvard Public Schools #11
- Sutton Public Schools #2

=== Hall County ===
- Doniphan-Trumbull Public Schools #126

=== Hamilton County ===
- Aurora Public Schools #504
- Giltner Public Schools #2
- Hampton Public Schools #91

=== Nuckolls County ===
- South Central Nebraska Unified System 5
- Superior Public Schools #11

=== Webster County ===
- Blue Hill Public Schools #74
- Red Cloud Community Schools #2

== ESU #10 ==
=== Blaine County ===
- Sandhills Public Schools #71

=== Boone County ===
- Riverside Public Schools #75

=== Buffalo County ===
- Amherst Public Schools #119
- Elm Creek Public Schools #9
- Gibbon Public Schools #2
- Kearney Public Schools #7
- Pleasanton Public Schools #105
- Ravenna Public Schools #69
- Shelton Public Schools #19

=== Custer County ===
- Anselmo-Merna Public Schools #15
- Ansley Public Schools #44
- Arnold Public Schools #89
- Broken Bow Public Schools #25
- Callaway Public Schools #180
- Sargent Public Schools #84

=== Dawson County ===
- Cozad City Schools #11
- Gothenburg Public Schools #20
- Lexington Public Schools #1
- Overton Public Schools #4
- Sumner-Eddyville-Miller Schools #101

=== Garfield County ===
- Burwell Public Schools #100

=== Greeley County ===
- Central Valley Public Schools #60

=== Hall County ===
- Grand Island Public Schools #2
- Northwest Public Schools #82
- Wood River Rural Schools #83

=== Howard County ===
- Centura Public School #100
- Elba Public Schools #103
- St. Paul Public Schools #1

=== Loup County ===
- Loup County Public Schools #25

=== Sherman County ===
- Litchfield Public Schools #15
- Loup City Public Schools #1

=== Valley County ===
- Arcadia Public Schools #21
- Ord Public Schools #5

== ESU #11 ==
=== Franklin County ===
- Franklin Public Schools #506

=== Frontier County ===
- Eustis-Farnam Public Schools #95

=== Furnas County ===
- Arapahoe Public Schools #18
- Cambridge Public Schools #21
- Southern Valley Schools #540

=== Gosper County ===
- Elwood Public Schools #30

=== Harlan County ===
- Alma Public Schools #2

=== Kearney County ===
- Axtell Public Schools #501
- Minden Public Schools #503
- Wilcox-Hildreth Public Schools #1

=== Phelps County ===
- Bertrand Public Schools #54
- Holdrege Public Schools #44
- Loomis Public Schools #55

== ESU #13 ==
=== Banner County ===
- Banner County Public Schools #1

=== Deuel County ===
- Creek Valley Schools #25

=== Box Butte County ===
- Alliance Public Schools #6
- Hemingford Public Schools #10

=== Cheyenne County ===
- Leyton Public Schools #3
- Potter-Dix Public Schools #9
- Sidney Public Schools #1

=== Dawes County ===
- Chadron Public Schools #2
- Crawford Public Schools #71

=== Garden County ===
- Garden County Schools #1

=== Kimball County ===
- Kimball Public Schools #1

=== Morrill County ===
- Bayard Public Schools #21
- Bridgeport Public Schools #63

=== Scotts Bluff County ===
- Gering Public Schools #16
- Minatare Public Schools #2
- Mitchell Public Schools #31
- Morrill Public Schools #11
- Scottsbluff Public Schools #32

=== Sheridan County ===
- Gordon-Rushville Public Schools #10
- Hay Springs Public Schools #3

=== Sioux County ===
- Sioux County Schools #500

== ESU #15 ==
=== Chase County ===
- Chase County Schools #10
- Wauneta-Palisade Public Schools #536

=== Frontier County ===
- Maywood Public Schools #46
- Medicine Valley Public Schools #125

=== Dundy County ===
- Dundy County Public Schools #117

=== Hayes County ===
- Hayes Center Public Schools #79

=== Hitchcock County ===
- Hitchcock County Unified School System #70

=== Red Willow County ===
- McCook Public Schools #17
- Southwest Public Schools #179

== ESU #16 ==
=== Arthur County ===
- Arthur County Schools #500

=== Deuel County ===
- South Platte Public Schools #95

=== Grant County ===
- Hyannis Area Schools #11

=== Hooker County ===
- Mullen Public Schools #1

=== Keith County ===
- Ogallala Public Schools #1
- Paxton Consolidated Schools #6

=== Lincoln County ===
- Brady Public Schools #6
- Hershey Public Schools #37
- Maxwell Public Schools #7
- North Platte Public Schools #1
- Sutherland Public Schools #55
- Wallace Public School District #565

=== Logan County ===
- Stapleton Public Schools #501

=== McPherson County ===
- McPherson County Schools #90

=== Perkins County ===
- Perkins County Schools #20

=== Thomas County ===
- Thedford Public Schools #1

== ESU #17 ==
=== Brown County ===
- Ainsworth Community Schools #10

=== Cherry County ===
- Cody-Kilgore Public Schools #30
- Valentine Community Schools #6

=== Keya Paha County ===
- Keya Paha County Public Schools #100

=== Rock County ===
- Rock County Schools #100

== ESU #18 ==
=== Lancaster County ===
- Lincoln Public Schools #1 (Class 4)

== ESU #19 ==
=== Douglas County ===
- Omaha Public Schools #1 (Class 5)

== Former school districts ==
Listed by date of dissolution:

=== 1991 ===
- Ash Creek Public School
- Centennial Public School (#93-0073-000)
- College Hill Public School
- District 2 Keith County
- District 5 Wayne County
- District 14 Holt County
- District 15 Thurston County
- District 18 Dawson County
- District 22 Box Butte County
- District 27 Keith County
- District 34 Cuming County
- District 36 Stanton County
- District 49 Platte County
- Edison Public School
- Fairview Public School
- Gilchrist Public School
- Hillside Public School
- Inez Valley Public School
- Mascot Public School
- Memphis Public School
- New England Valley School
- Northwest Cherry Public School
- Palisade Public Schools
- Paramount Public School
- Pick Public School
- Pleasant Ridge Public School
- Pleasant Valley Public School
- Riverside Public School
- Sunnyside Public School
- Taylor Public School
- Two Rivers Public School
- Wauneta Public School
- West Olive Public School
- Willis Public School
- Willow Creek Public School

=== 1992 ===
- District 16 Box Butte County
- Happy Dale Public School
- Prairie Bell School

=== 1993 ===
- District 40 Box Butte County
- Log Pine Public School

=== 1994 ===
- District 1 Box Butte County

=== 1997 ===
- Willowdale Public School

=== 1998 ===
- District 65 Box Butte County
- District 74 Boone County
- Pleasant Valley Public School
- Wilson Public School

=== 1999 ===
- District 49 Boone County
- Triangle Public School

=== 2000 ===
- Petersburg Public Schools

=== 2001 ===
- Beaver Valley Public School

=== 2002 ===
- Johnstown Public School
- Leader Public School

=== 2003 ===
- Hanover Public School
- Plum Center Public School

=== 2004 ===
- Dawson-Verdon Public Schools
- Unified Niobrara-Lynch

=== 2005 ===
- Center Valley Public School
- Rising Star Public School

=== 2006 ===
- Abie Public School
- Arthur Elementary School
- Ayr Public School
- Brownlee Public School
- Buffalo Flats Public School
- Center Public School
- Crookston Public School
- District 15 Adams County
- District 39 Box Butte County
- District 42 Box Butte County
- District 44 Box Butte County
- District 45 Cherry County
- District 65 Buffalo County
- District 83 Cherry County
- Eastpoint Public School
- Elm Creek Public School
- Elsmere Public School
- Evergreen Public School
- Garfield Public School
- Irwin Public School
- Highland Grove Public Schools
- Holstein Public School
- Juniata Elementary School
- Kewanee Public School
- Manley Public School
- Merriman Public School
- Odessa Public School
- Pioneer Public School
- Pleasant Hill Public School
- Raven Public School
- Riverdale Public School
- Shell Creek Public School
- Simeon Public School
- South Akron Public School
- Sparks Public School
- Stone Public School
- Stull Public School
- Sunnyside Public School
- Tri-View Public School
- Valentine City Schools
- Valley View Public School
- Wallace Public School
- Wood Lake Public School

=== 2007 ===
- Butte Public Schools
- Nemaha Valley Schools
- Spence-Napier Public Schools
- Stratton Public Schools
- Tecumseh Public Schools
- West Boyd Unified System

=== 2008 ===
- Culbertson Public Schools
- Trenton Public Schools

=== 2009 ===
- Southeast Nebraska Consolidated Schools

=== 2010 ===
- Prague Public Schools

=== 2011 ===
- Clay Center Public Schools
- Rising City Public Schools

=== 2014 ===
- Cedar Rapids Public School
- Coleridge Community Schools
- Greely-Wolbach Public Schools
- Newcastle Public Schools
- North Loup Scotia Public Schools
- Spalding Public Schools

=== 2017 ===
- Lynch Public Schools
- West Boyd School District

=== 2020 ===
- Clearwater Public Schools
- Ewing Public Schools
- Orchard Public Schools

== See also ==
- List of high schools in Nebraska
- Educational Service Units of Nebraska
