= Louisville Public Schools =

Louisville Public Schools can refer to one of two school districts in the United States:

- Louisville Public Schools, Nebraska, officially Cass County District 32, a school district in Louisville, Nebraska
- Louisville Public Schools, Kentucky, a defunct district that served Louisville, Kentucky
- Public schools in Louisville, Kentucky, public schools in Louisville, Kentucky, primarily through the Jefferson County Public Schools
