= Joel Makovicka =

American football player (born 1975)

Member of the University of Nebraska Board of Regents from the 3rd district
- Incumbent
- Assumed office February 3, 2026
- Preceded by: Elizabeth O'Connor

Personal details
- Born: October 6, 1975 (age 51) Brainard, Nebraska, U.S.
- Party: Republican
- Relatives: Michael Helman (cousin)
- Education: University of Nebraska–Lincoln (BS); Creighton University (DPT)
- Football career

No. 34
- Position: Fullback

Personal information
- Listed height: 5 ft 11 in (1.80 m)
- Listed weight: 246 lb (112 kg)

Career information
- High school: Brainard (NE) East Butler
- College: Nebraska
- NFL draft: 1999: 4th round, 116th overall pick

Career history
- Arizona Cardinals (1999–2002)

Career NFL statistics
- Receptions: 47
- Receiving yards: 264
- Receiving touchdowns: 5
- Rushing attempts: 17
- Rushing yards: 88
- Stats at Pro Football Reference

Joel P. Makovicka (born October 6, 1975) is an American former professional football player who was a fullback for the Arizona Cardinals of the National Football League (NFL). He played college football for the Nebraska Cornhuskers.

== Professional career ==
Makovicka is one of the most decorated fullbacks in Husker history and owns the school record for a fullback with 13 career touchdowns from 1995 to 1998. During his stay at Nebraska, Makovicka was a two-time first-team Academic All-American and three-time first-team Academic All-Big 12 performer. He also was a member of three national championship teams. The younger brother of another Husker walk-on fullback from Brainard, Nebraska, Jeff Makovicka, Joel finished his career with 1,447 yards rushing on an average of 5.9 yards per carry while making 22 starts for the red and white. As a junior, he produced the fourth-highest rushing total by a fullback in school history with 685 yards. He was selected by the Arizona Cardinals in the fourth round of the 1999 NFL draft and started 10 games at fullback for the Cardinals as a rookie.

== Post-playing career ==
After his football career he returned to school at Creighton University where he received his doctorate in physical therapy. He opened his first PT clinic in 2009 and now manages a practice with numerous clinics in the Omaha and Lincoln metro area.

== Personal life ==
Makovicka's cousin, Michael Helman, plays in Major League Baseball (MLB) for the Texas Rangers.
