= Wayne Community Schools =

Wayne Community Schools may refer to:

- Wayne Community Schools (Nebraska)
- Wayne Community School District (Iowa)
