= McCool (disambiguation) =

McCool is a surname.

McCool, MacCool, or variation, may also refer to:

== Places ==
- McCool, Mississippi, USA; a town in Attala County
- McCool Junction, Nebraska, USA; a village in York County
- McCool, Ontario, Canada; an unincorporated community in Timiskaming District, Northeastern Ontario
- McCool (crater), a crater on the Moon

== Other uses ==
- USS Richard M. McCool Jr. (LPD-29) (a.k.a. USS McCool), a U.S.Navy San Antonio-class amphibious transport dock ship
- McCool Stadium, Cleveland, Mississippi, USA; an American football field
- McCool Junction Public Schools, York County, Nebraska, USA; a school board
- McCool Junction Elementary School, McCool Junction Public Schools, York County, Nebraska, USA

== See also ==
- MCOOL (mandatory country of origin labeling)
- One Night at McCool's, 2001 film
- Cool McCool, 1966 animated TV show
- Cool (disambiguation)
