= Sandhills Public School =

Sandhills Public School may refer to:

- Sandhills Public School, Kitchener, Ontario - Waterloo Region District School Board
- Sandhills Public Schools in Dunning, Nebraska
