= Michael Helman =

American baseball player (born 1996)

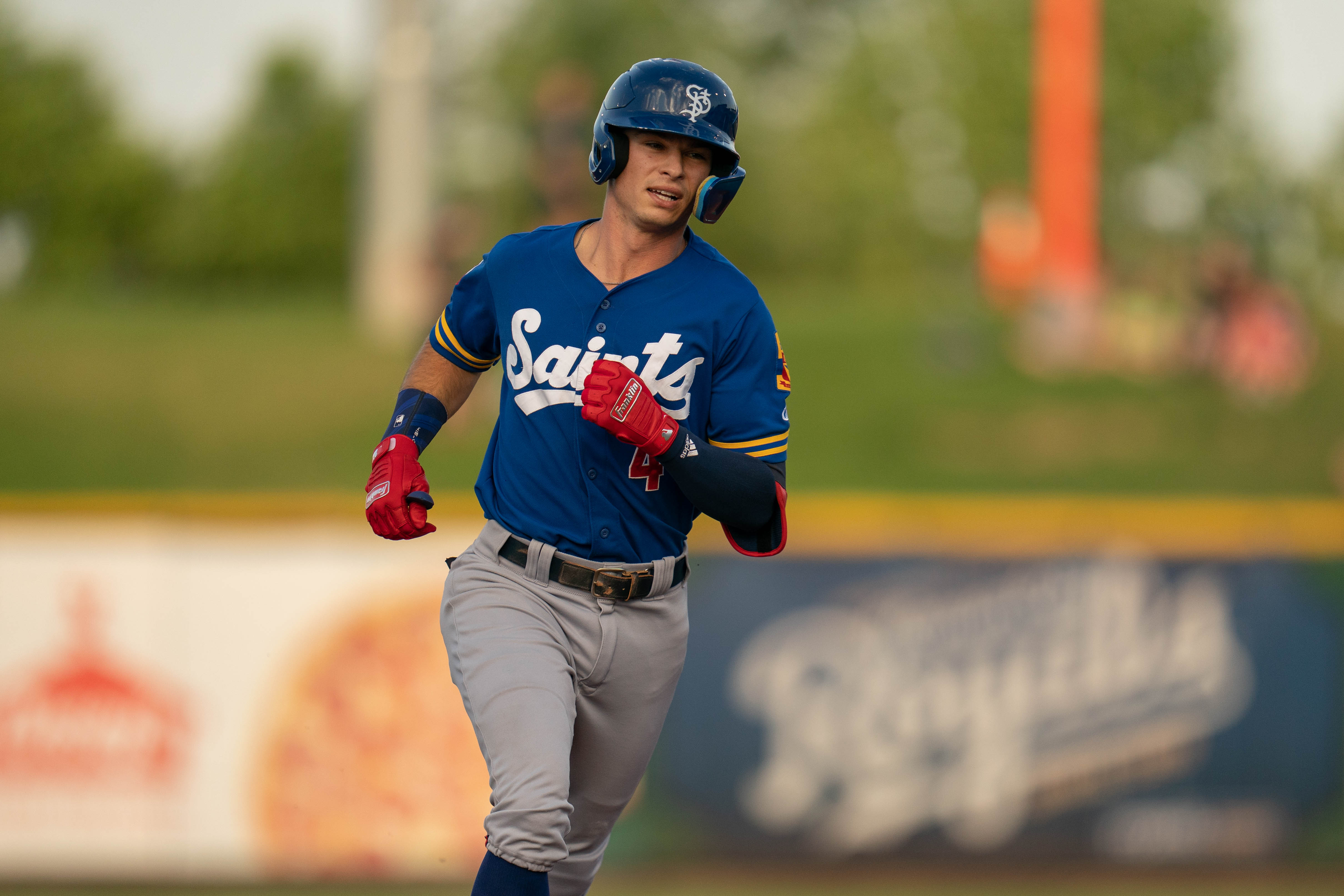
- Helman with the St. Paul Saints in 2022

Free agent
- Utility player
- Born: May 23, 1996 (age 30); Lincoln, Nebraska, U.S.
- Bats: Right Throws: Right

MLB debut
- September 3, 2024, for the Minnesota Twins

MLB statistics (through 2026 season)
- Batting average: .223
- Home runs: 6
- Runs batted in: 22
- Stats at Baseball Reference

Teams
- Minnesota Twins (2024); Texas Rangers (2025–2026)

Michael James Helman (born May 23, 1996) is an American professional baseball utility player who is a free agent. He has previously played in Major League Baseball (MLB) for the Minnesota Twins and Texas Rangers.

== Amateur career ==
Helman attended Pius X High School in Lincoln, Nebraska where he played baseball and basketball. After graduating in 2015, he played two years of college baseball at Hutchinson Community College. As a sophomore in 2017, he batted .487 with 111 hits, 17 home runs, and 73 RBIs over sixty games and was named National Junior College Player of the Year. He transferred to Texas A&M University for the 2018 season where he started 62 games and hit .369 with six home runs, 36 RBIs, and 12 stolen bases.

== Professional career ==
=== Minnesota Twins ===
Helman was drafted by the Minnesota Twins in the 11th round, with the 334th overall selection, of the 2018 Major League Baseball draft. He signed with the Twins and split his first professional season between the rookie–level Elizabethton Twins and Single–A Cedar Rapids Kernels, batting .361 with four home runs over 39 games between the two teams. He spent the 2019 season with the High–A Fort Myers Miracle where he hit .197 over 82 games, missing the end of the season after breaking his arm. Helman did not play in a game in 2020 due to the cancellation of the minor league season because of the COVID-19 pandemic.

Helman returned to Cedar Rapids for the 2021 season and batted .246 with 19 home runs, 57 RBI, and 21 stolen bases over 111 games. He opened the 2022 season with the Double–A Wichita Wind Surge before he was promoted to the Triple–A St. Paul Saints. Over 135 games between the two clubs, he slashed .258/.337/.423 with twenty home runs, sixty RBI, and forty stolen bases. Helman played only 38 games in 2023 due to injury, playing with Fort Myers, Wichita, and St. Paul, batting .302 with seven home runs and forty RBI.

Helman began the 2024 campaign with St. Paul, slashing .283/.367/.508 with 13 home runs, 43 RBI, and 10 stolen bases. On September 1, 2024, Helman was selected to the 40-man roster and promoted to the major leagues for the first time. In 9 games for Minnesota, he went 3-for-10 (.300).

=== St. Louis Cardinals ===
On February 6, 2025, Helman was traded to the St. Louis Cardinals in exchange for cash considerations. He was optioned to the Triple-A Memphis Redbirds to begin the season. In 18 appearances for Memphis, Helman slashed .185/.260/.292 with one home run, five RBI, and one stolen bases.

On May 14, 2025, Helman was claimed off waivers by the Pittsburgh Pirates. Helman did not appear for the organization before he was designated for assignment on May 16.

=== Texas Rangers ===
On May 19, 2025, Helman was claimed off waivers by the Texas Rangers. On July 21, Helman hit his first career home run off of Jacob Lopez of the Athletics. He made 38 total appearances for Texas, batting .232/.290/.455 with five home runs, 20 RBI, and four stolen bases.

Helman was optioned to the Triple-A Round Rock Express to begin the 2026 season. On June 14, 2026, Helman was placed on the injured list due to multiple fractures in his right hand; he had suffered the injury the previous day, after being hit by a pitch from Tyron Guerrero of the Boston Red Sox. He was transferred to the 60-day injured list on June 19. Helman was activated from the injured list on September 22. On November 2, Helman was removed from the 40–man roster and elected free agency.

== Personal life ==
Helman's cousin, Joel Makovicka, played in the NFL.
