= Oak Creek Township, Butler County, Nebraska =

Oak Creek Township
- Township
- Location in Butler County
- Coordinates: 41°10′30″N 096°57′52″W
- Country: United States
- State: Nebraska
- County: Butler

Area
  - Total: 35.92 sq mi (93.03 km^{2})
  - Land: 35.80 sq mi (92.72 km^{2})
  - Water: 0.12 sq mi (0.32 km^{2}) 0.34%
- Elevation: 1,463 ft (446 m)

Population (2020)
  - Total: 501
  - Density: 14.0/sq mi (5.40/km^{2})
- GNIS feature ID: 0838166

Oak Creek Township is one of seventeen townships in Butler County, Nebraska, United States. The population was 501 at the 2020 census. A 2021 estimate placed the township's population at 506.

The village of Brainard lies within the Township.

== See also ==
- County government in Nebraska
