= Malcolm Junior/Senior High School =

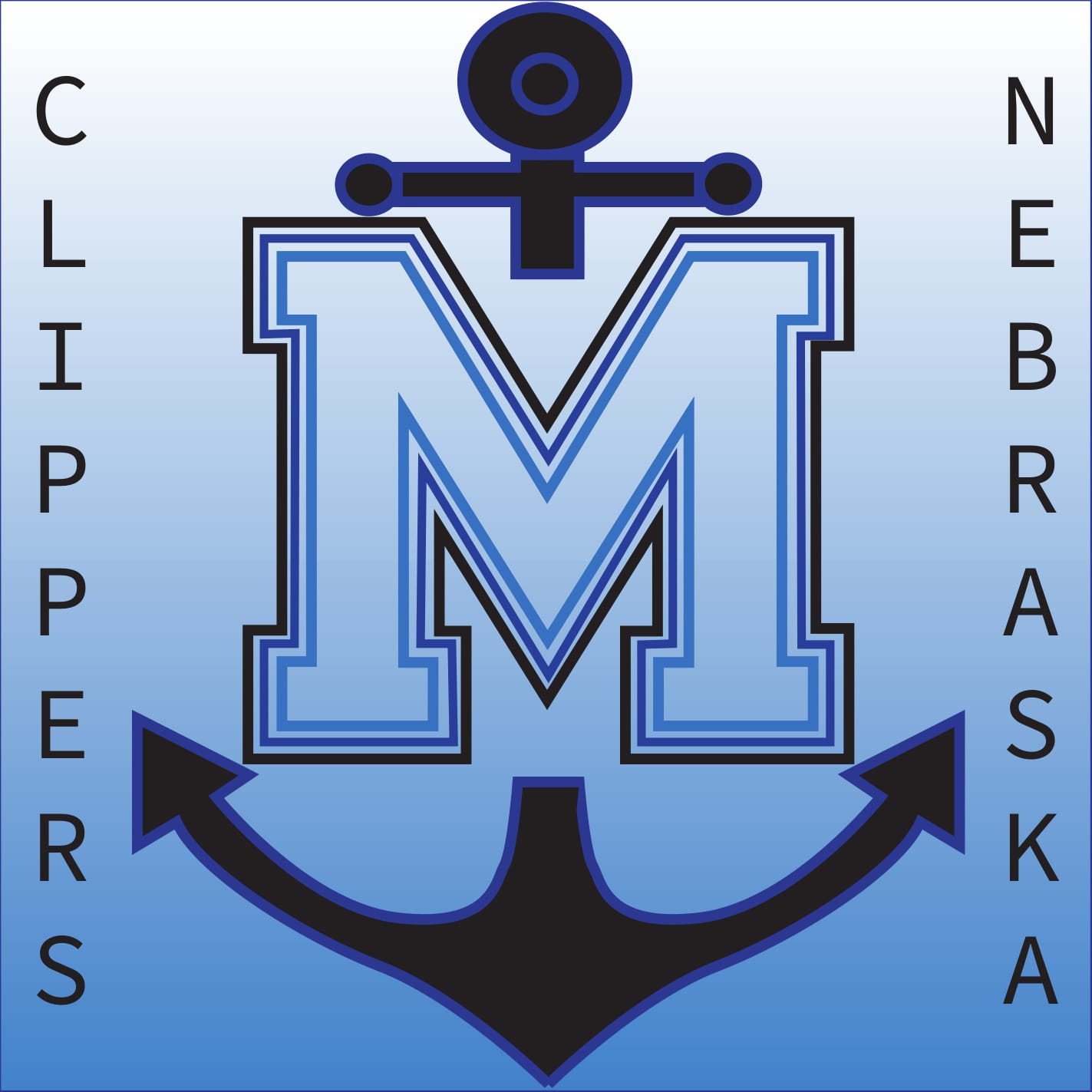

Location
- 10002 NW 112th Street; Malcolm, Nebraska; United States; 40°54′52″N 96°52′11″W

Information
- Type: Public
- Established: 1919
- School district: Malcolm Public Schools District 148
- NCES School ID: 317329001210
- Teaching staff: 19.51 (on FTE basis)
- Grades: 7 to 12
- Enrollment: 305 (2023–2024)
- Student to teacher ratio: 15.63
- Colors: Royal blue and white
- Athletics conference: Eastern Central Nebraska Conference
- Nickname: Clippers
- Website: Malcolm Public Schools

Malcolm Junior/Senior High School is a public secondary school located in Malcolm, Nebraska, United States.

== History ==
The school was established in 1917, but due to lack of funding was unable to provide many extracurricular activities. The school grew its resources and opportunities offered to students until 1944, when the school was burned down. In 1946, a new facility opened which remained in use until the late 1990s. The current school building was built in 1998. In the summer of 2018, a major renovation was done in the existing buildings adding more classrooms and a middle school commons.

== Location ==
The school is located at 10002 NW 112th Street, Malcolm, Nebraska 68402.

== Extracurricular activities ==
The school is a member of the Eastern Central Nebraska Conference. Malcolm offers many opportunities. For girls there is cross country, volleyball, basketball, softball, track, and wrestling. For boys there is cross country, football, basketball, baseball, track, and wrestling. Malcolm also participates in unified bowling. Students may also take part in speech and drama, vocal and instrumental music, and business clubs.
