= Keya Paha County High School =

- U.S. National Register of Historic Places
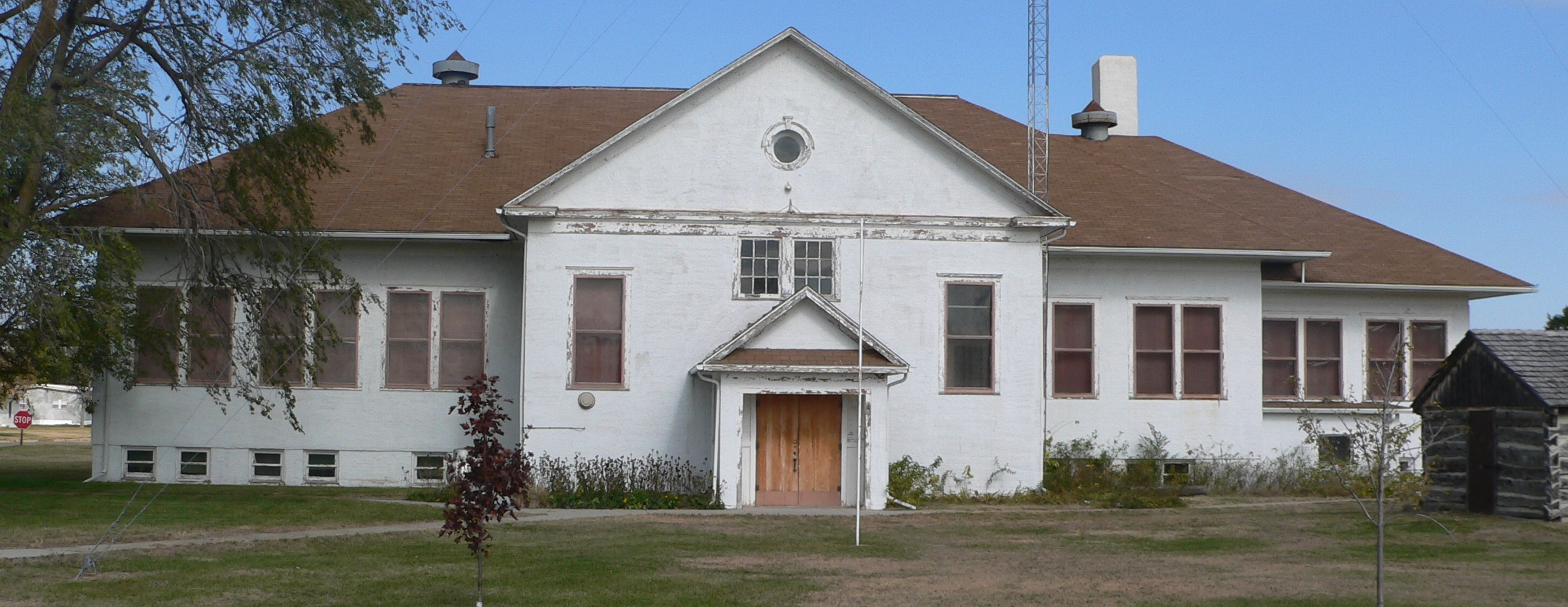

- Location within Nebraska Location within the United States
- Location: 305 Courthouse Drive, Springview, Nebraska
- Coordinates: 42°49′32″N 99°44′50″W
- Area: less than one acre
- Built: 1915-1916, 1929
- Built by: Weddell, U.S.; Et al.
- NRHP reference No.: 86003377
- Added to NRHP: December 1, 1986

Keya Paha County High School, located on Courthouse Drive off NE 12 in Springview, Nebraska, is an architectural example of county high schools created for the widely distributed children in the region. First constructed in 1915 after a law mandating county high schools in 1913, Keya Paha County High School was built by U.S. Weddell, a local builder. Construction was completed in five months with the school opening on January 26, 1916. in 1929 an addition was added to the building. With the work done by local contractors J. E. Lee and J. H. Mock. In 1965 the school was closed and has since been used by the local historical society, and is now the Keya Paha County Historical Museum.

It was deemed historically significant "as a well-preserved example of a county high school in Nebraska" and was listed on the National Register of Historic Places in 1986.
