= Wood River, Nebraska =

Village in Hall County, Nebraska, United States

- City
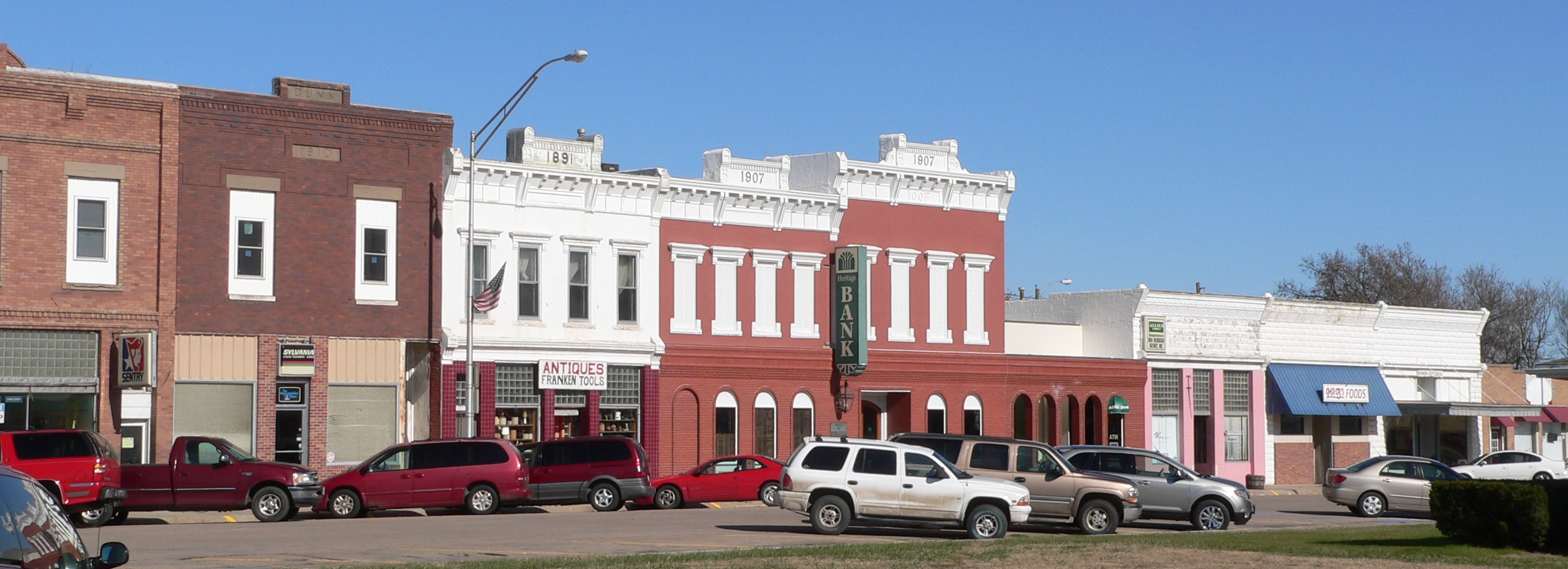
- Ninth Street, Wood River, November 2009

- Logo

- Location of Wood River, Nebraska
- Coordinates: 40°49′10″N 98°36′15″W
- Country: United States
- State: Nebraska
- County: Hall

Area
  - Total: 1.13 sq mi (2.93 km^{2})
  - Land: 1.13 sq mi (2.93 km^{2})
  - Water: 0 sq mi (0.00 km^{2})
- Elevation: 1,965 ft (599 m)

Population (2020)
  - Total: 1,172
  - Density: 1,035.9/sq mi (399.96/km^{2})
- Time zone: UTC-6 (Central (CST))
  - Summer (DST): UTC-5 (CDT)
- ZIP code: 68883
- Area code: 308
- FIPS code: 31-53660
- GNIS feature ID: 2397364
- Website: woodriverne.com

Wood River is a city in southwestern Hall County, Nebraska, United States. The population was 1,172 at the 2020 census. It is part of the Grand Island, Nebraska Metropolitan Statistical Area.

== History ==
Wood River was first laid out in 1868, but when the railroad moved the depot, the town followed it, and moved to its current site in 1874.

== Geography ==
Wood River lies just south of the Wood River and approximately 3.5 miles north of the Platte River on U.S. Route 30 between Grand Island, 14.5 miles to the northeast and Kearney, 25.5 miles to the southwest.

According to the United States Census Bureau, the city has a total area of 0.79 square miles (2.05 km^{2}), all land.

== Demographics ==
Historical population
Census	Pop.	Note	%±
1890	481		—
1900	589		22.5%
1910	796		35.1%
1920	820		3.0%
1930	751		−8.4%
1940	829		10.4%
1950	858		3.5%
1960	828		−3.5%
1970	1,147		38.5%
1980	1,334		16.3%
1990	1,156		−13.3%
2000	1,204		4.2%
2010	1,325		10.0%
2020	1,172		−11.5%
U.S. Decennial Census

=== 2010 census ===
As of the census of 2010, there were 1,325 people, 478 households, and 345 families living in the city. The population density was 1,677.2 inhabitants per square mile (647.6/km^{2}). There were 495 housing units at an average density of 626.6 per square mile (241.9/km^{2}). The racial makeup of the city was 89.3% White, 0.1% Native American, 0.2% Asian, 9.6% from other races, and 0.9% from two or more races. Hispanic or Latino of any race were 17.7% of the population.

There were 478 households, of which 38.3% had children under the age of 18 living with them, 55.6% were married couples living together, 10.3% had a female householder with no husband present, 6.3% had a male householder with no wife present, and 27.8% were non-families. 24.7% of all households were made up of individuals, and 12% had someone living alone who was 65 years of age or older. The average household size was 2.65 and the average family size was 3.14.

The median age in the city was 37.5 years. 27.6% of residents were under the age of 18; 7.3% were between the ages of 18 and 24; 25.1% were from 25 to 44; 21.2% were from 45 to 64; and 18.6% were 65 years of age or older. The gender makeup of the city was 50.1% male and 49.9% female.

=== 2000 census ===
As of the census of 2000, there were 1,204 people, 456 households, and 320 families living in the city. The population density was 1,675.9 inhabitants per square mile (647.1/km^{2}). There were 481 housing units at an average density of 669.5 per square mile (258.5/km^{2}). The racial makeup of the city was 96.35% White, 0.25% African American, 0.08% Native American, 0.08% Asian, 2.82% from other races, and 0.42% from two or more races. Hispanic or Latino of any race were 12.46% of the population.

There were 456 households, out of which 34.4% had children under the age of 18 living with them, 59.6% were married couples living together, 6.1% had a female householder with no husband present, and 29.8% were non-families. 27.0% of all households were made up of individuals, and 15.1% had someone living alone who was 65 years of age or older. The average household size was 2.51 and the average family size was 3.03.

The median age in Wood River was 38 years. The age distribution was: 27.2% under the age of 18, 6.1% from 18 to 24, 27.4% from 25 to 44, 19.6% from 45 to 64, and 19.8% aged 65 years or older. For every 100 females, there were 99.3 males. For every 100 females age 18 and over, there were 89.4 males.

As of 2000 the median income for a household in the city was $36,776, and the median income for a family was $44,453. Males had a median income of $27,596 versus $20,179 for females. The per capita income for the city was $16,275. About 10.1% of families and 12.8% of the population were below the poverty line, including 16.1% of those under age 18 and 9.7% of those age 65 or over.

== Education ==
Wood River Rural Schools serves the community.

== Notable people ==
- Scott Frost - professional American football player and college football coach
- Edgar A. Wedgwood, sheriff of Hall County, Nebraska and adjutant general of the Utah National Guard

== See also ==
- List of municipalities in Nebraska
