= Madison High School (Nebraska) =

Secondary school in Madison, Nebraska, United States

Coordinates: 41°49′29″N 97°27′30″W

Location
- 700 South Kent Street; Madison, (Madison County), Nebraska 68748; United States

Information
- Type: Public high school
- Principal: Jim Crilly
- Teaching staff: 17.35 (FTE)
- Enrollment: 158 (2023-2024)
- Student to teacher ratio: 9.11
- Colors: Red and gray
- Athletics conference: East Husker Conference
- Nickname: Dragons

Madison High School is a secondary school in Madison, Nebraska, United States. It has a population of 566 students.
