= Thedford Public Schools =

School district in Nebraska, United States

Thedford Public Schools is a school district headquartered in Thedford, Nebraska. It operates two schools: Thedford Elementary School and Thedford High School. The district has an acreage of about 700 square miles (1,800 km^{2}).

The high school's main athletic rivalry was with Sandhill High School in Dunning, but by 2009 the schools began sharing a single football team. The decline in agricultural labor in the United States caused a reduced number of residents in the towns and the lower proportions of children; this in turn resulted in lower enrollments in the two school districts.
