= Brainard, Nebraska =

Village in Nebraska, US

- Village
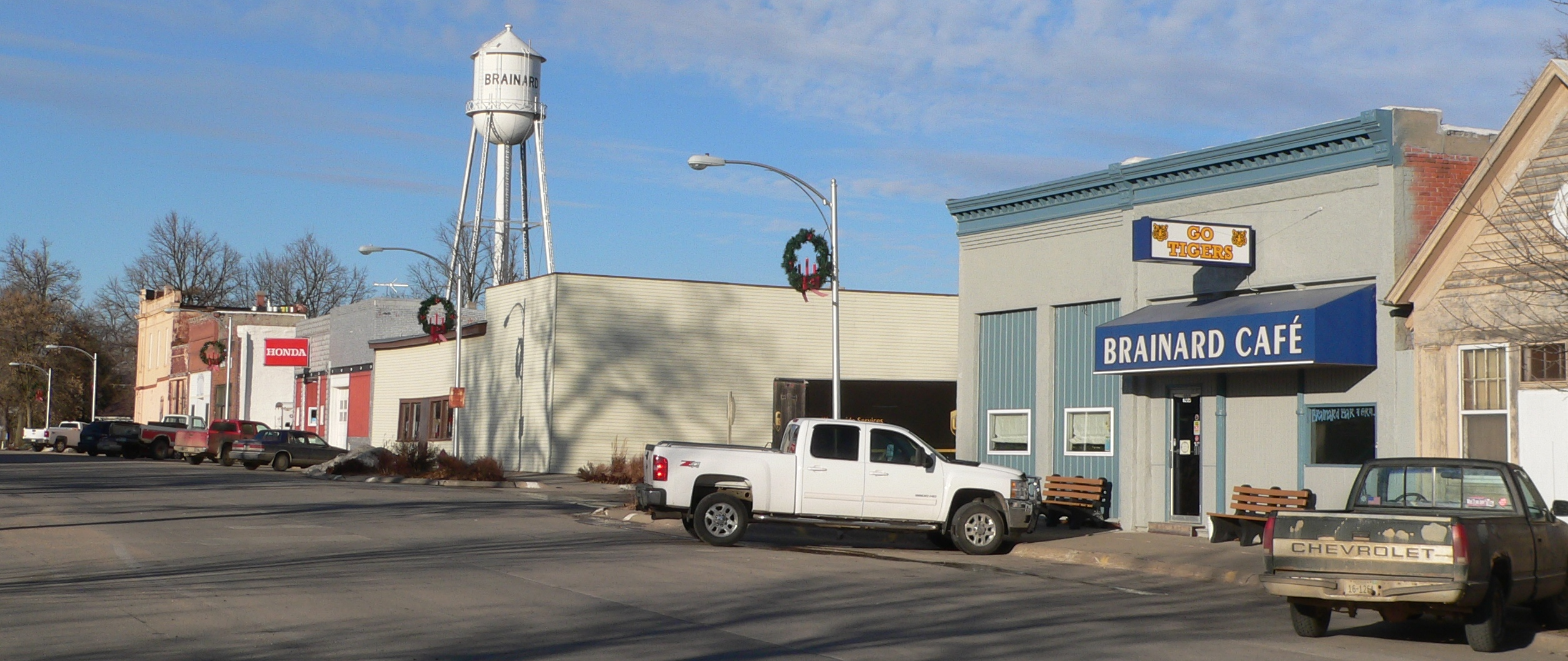
- Downtown Brainard

- Location of Brainard, Nebraska

- Location within Nebraska Location within the United States
- Coordinates: 41°10′54″N 97°00′08″W
- Country: United States
- State: Nebraska
- County: Butler
- Township: Oak Creek

Area
  - Total: 0.31 sq mi (0.80 km^{2})
  - Land: 0.31 sq mi (0.80 km^{2})
  - Water: 0 sq mi (0.00 km^{2})
- Elevation: 1,673 ft (510 m)

Population (2020)
  - Total: 336
  - Density: 1,082.9/sq mi (418.12/km^{2})
- Time zone: UTC-6 (Central (CST))
  - Summer (DST): UTC-5 (CDT)
- ZIP code: 68626
- Area code: 402
- FIPS code: 31-06120
- GNIS feature ID: 2398169
- Website: brainardnebraska.com

Brainard is a village in Butler County, Nebraska, United States. As of the 2020 census, Brainard had a population of 336.

== History ==
Brainard was laid out in 1878 when the railroad was extended to that point. It was named for David Brainerd, an American missionary to the Native Americans, although the spelling is different.

== Geography ==
According to the United States Census Bureau, the village has a total area of 0.33 square miles (0.85 km^{2}), all land.

== Demographics ==
Historical population
Census	Pop.	Note	%±
1880	61		—
1890	306		401.6%
1900	384		25.5%
1910	465		21.1%
1920	468		0.6%
1930	400		−14.5%
1940	444		11.0%
1950	373		−16.0%
1960	300		−19.6%
1970	309		3.0%
1980	275		−11.0%
1990	326		18.5%
2000	351		7.7%
2010	330		−6.0%
2020	336		1.8%
U.S. Decennial Census

=== 2010 census ===
As of the census of 2010, there were 330 people, 152 households, and 90 families living in the village. The population density was 1,000.0 inhabitants per square mile (386.1/km^{2}). There were 174 housing units at an average density of 527.3 per square mile (203.6/km^{2}). The racial makeup of the village was 99.7% White and 0.3% from other races. Hispanic or Latino of any race were 0.9% of the population.

There were 152 households, of which 23.7% had children under the age of 18 living with them, 54.6% were married couples living together, 3.9% had a female householder with no husband present, 0.7% had a male householder with no wife present, and 40.8% were non-families. 38.8% of all households were made up of individuals, and 17.1% had someone living alone who was 65 years of age or older. The average household size was 2.17 and the average family size was 2.91.

The median age in the village was 45.5 years. 22.1% of residents were under the age of 18; 6.7% were between the ages of 18 and 24; 20.2% were from 25 to 44; 31.3% were from 45 to 64; and 19.7% were 65 years of age or older. The gender makeup of the village was 51.5% male and 48.5% female.

=== 2000 census ===
As of the census of 2000, there were 351 people, 148 households, and 100 families living in the village. The population density was 1,252.1 inhabitants per square mile (483.4/km^{2}). There were 162 housing units at an average density of 577.9 per square mile (223.1/km^{2}). The racial makeup of the village was 99.43% White, and 0.57% from two or more races.

There were 148 households, out of which 37.2% had children under the age of 18 living with them, 56.8% were married couples living together, 9.5% had a female householder with no husband present, and 31.8% were non-families. 29.7% of all households were made up of individuals, and 12.8% had someone living alone who was 65 years of age or older. The average household size was 2.37 and the average family size was 2.95.

In the village, the population was spread out, with 28.5% under the age of 18, 4.6% from 18 to 24, 24.5% from 25 to 44, 24.5% from 45 to 64, and 17.9% who were 65 years of age or older. The median age was 40 years. For every 100 females, there were 105.3 males. For every 100 females age 18 and over, there were 91.6 males.

As of 2000 the median income for a household in the village was $35,000, and the median income for a family was $44,375. Males had a median income of $29,722 versus $21,667 for females. The per capita income for the village was $17,713. About 2.9% of families and 4.5% of the population were below the poverty line, including 5.9% of those under age 18 and none of those age 65 or over.

== Education ==
Brainard Public Schools are part of the East Butler Public Schools School District. There is one elementary school and one high school in the district.

== Notable people ==
- Jerome Hanus - Roman Catholic Archbishop of Dubuque
- Joel Makovicka - American football player
- Lyle Talbot - Actor
