= Thedford, Nebraska =

Village in and county seat of Thomas County Nebraska, United States

- Village
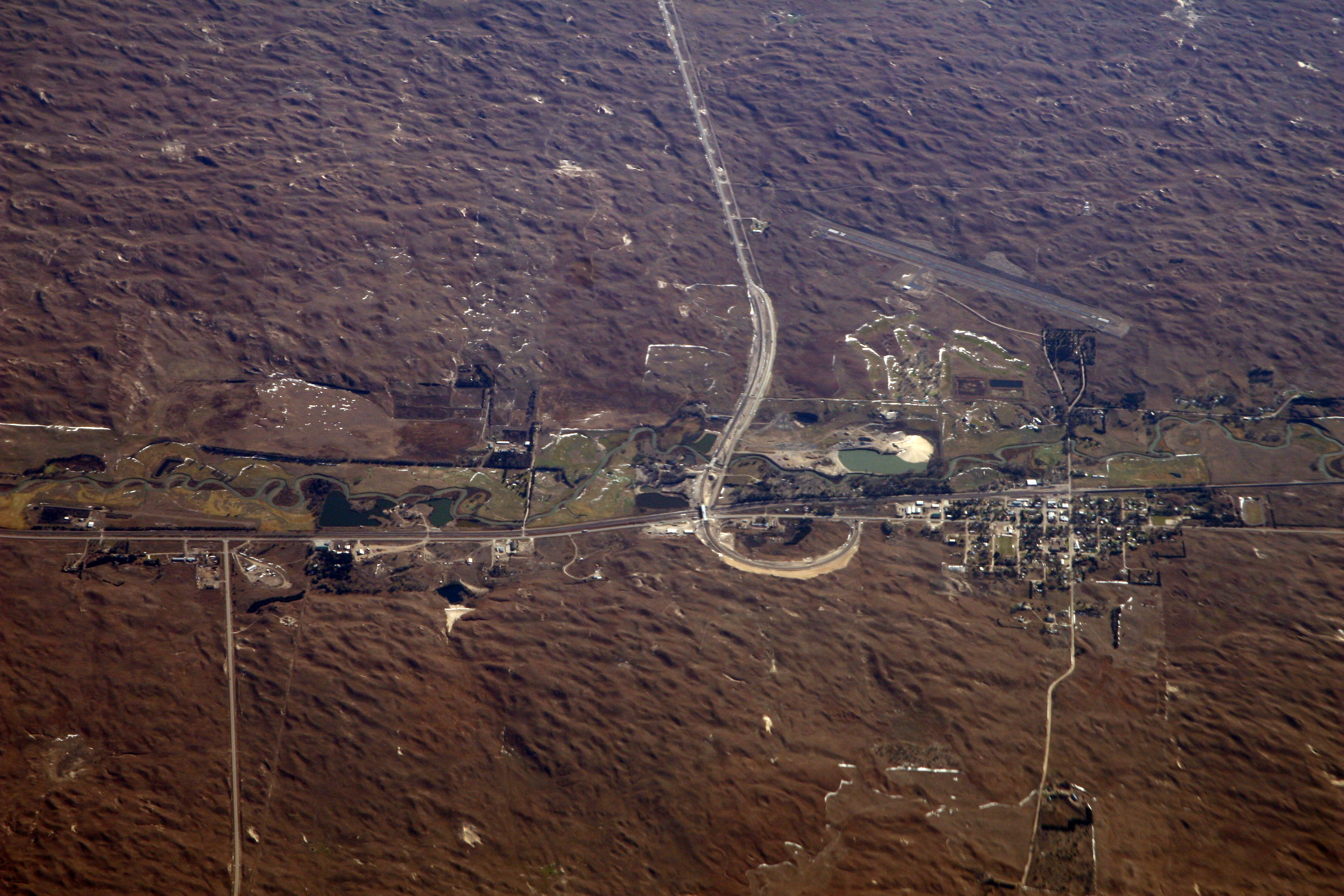
- Aerial view of Thedford

- Location of Thedford, Nebraska
- Coordinates: 41°58′45″N 100°34′29″W
- Country: United States
- State: Nebraska
- County: Thomas

Area
  - Total: 0.24 sq mi (0.62 km^{2})
  - Land: 0.24 sq mi (0.62 km^{2})
  - Water: 0 sq mi (0.00 km^{2})
- Elevation: 2,868 ft (874 m)

Population (2020)
  - Total: 208
  - Density: 865.8/sq mi (334.29/km^{2})
- Time zone: UTC-6 (Central (CST))
  - Summer (DST): UTC-5 (CDT)
- ZIP code: 69166
- Area code: 308
- FIPS code: 31-48760
- GNIS feature ID: 2399968
- Website: visitthedford.com

Thedford is a village in and the county seat of Thomas County, Nebraska, United States. The population was 208 at the 2020 census.

== History ==
Thedford was established in 1887 when the Chicago, Burlington and Quincy Railroad was extended to that point, at which time the new town was designated county seat. It was probably named after Thedford, Ontario, Canada. Thedford was incorporated as a village in 1914.

== Geography ==
According to the United States Census Bureau, the village has a total area of 0.23 square miles (0.60 km^{2}), all land.

Thedford is at the junction of U.S. Route 83 and Nebraska Route 2.

== Demographics ==
Historical population
Census	Pop.	Note	%±
1920	200		—
1930	270		35.0%
1940	288		6.7%
1950	275		−4.5%
1960	303		10.2%
1970	303		0.0%
1980	313		3.3%
1990	243		−22.4%
2000	211		−13.2%
2010	188		−10.9%
2020	208		10.6%
U.S. Decennial Census

=== 2010 census ===
At the 2010 census, there were 188 people, 93 households and 52 families residing in the village. The population density was 817.4 per square mile (315.6/km^{2}). There were 118 housing units at an average density of 513.0 per square mile (198.1/km^{2}). The racial make-up was 100.0% White. Hispanic or Latino of any race were 0.5% of the population.

There were 93 households, of which 21.5% had children under the age of 18 living with them, 47.3% were married couples living together, 3.2% had a female householder with no husband present, 5.4% had a male householder with no wife present, and 44.1% were non-families. 43.0% of all households were made up of individuals, and 15.1% had someone living alone who was 65 years of age or older. The average household size was 2.02 and the average family size was 2.69.

The median age was 44.7 years. 21.8% of residents were under the age of 18; 7% were between the ages of 18 and 24; 22.2% were from 25 to 44; 26% were from 45 to 64; and 22.9% were 65 years of age or older. The gender make-up was 46.8% male and 53.2% female.

=== 2000 census ===
At the 2000 census. there were 211 people, 101 households and 65 families residing in the village. The population density was 865.9 per square mile (334.3/km^{2}). There were 126 housing units at an average density of 517.1 per square mile (199.7/km^{2}). The racial make-up was 99.53% White and 0.47% from two or more races. Hispanic or Latino of any race were 2.37% of the population.

There were 101 households, of which 22.8% had children under the age of 18 living with them, 58.4% were married couples living together, 5.0% had a female householder with no husband present and 34.7% were non-families. 33.7% of all households were made up of individuals, and 16.8% had someone living alone who was 65 years of age or older. The average household size was 2.09 and the average family size was 2.65.

17.5% of the population were under the age of 18, 6.2% from 18 to 24, 25.6% from 25 to 44, 27.5% from 45 to 64, and 23.2% who were 65 years of age or older. The median age was 46 years. For every 100 females, there were 111.0 males. For every 100 females age 18 and over, there were 89.1 males.

The median household income was $29,583 and the median family income was $44,063. Males had a median income of $30,500 and females $20,938. The per capita income was $18,300. None of the families and 0.9% of the population were living below the poverty line, including no under eighteens and 3.4% of those over 64.

== Economy ==
In 2024, the municipality had one convenience store, two banks, two hotels, and one restaurant. Pearson Livestock Equipment Company formerly made cattle chutes in town for the livestock industry. Additionally, there is now a photography studio, custom cowboy hat maker, and a lumber yard.

== Education ==
Thedford Public Schools is the local school district. Some of the school activities are combined with a nearby school named Sandhills, which is in Dunning. The combined schools' activities mascot is the Sandhills-Thedford Knights.

== See also ==
- List of municipalities in Nebraska
