= Southern Valley Schools =

Public school district in Nebraska

Address
- 43739 Hwy 89 Oxford, Nebraska, 68967-2711; United States
- Coordinates: 40.1471°N 99.6862°W

District information
- Type: Local school district
- Grades: PK–12
- Established: 1993; 32 years ago
- Superintendent: Bryce Jorgenson
- NCES District ID: 3100109
- Affiliation(s): Nebraska School Activities Association

Students and staff
- Students: 466
- Teachers: 45.77
- Student–teacher ratio: 10.47
- Athletic conference: Republican Plains Activities Conference
- District mascot: Eli the Eagle
- Colors: Purple and silver

Other information
- Website: sveagles.org

Southern Valley Schools, also known as Southern Valley School District #540, is a consolidated public school district located in Oxford, Nebraska, United States, 3 miles (4.8 km) west of Stamford. The district was established in 1993, providing education for students in the communities of Beaver City, Edison, Hendley, Hollinger, Orleans, Oxford, and Stamford. The individual schools include Southern Valley High School and Southern Valley Elementary.

== 2010–2011 district characteristics ==
District data	District statistics
Poverty percentage	48.93%
English language learners percentage	0.00%
Special education percentage	16.89%
School mobility rate	13.51%
Graduation rate percentage	Unavailable
Attendance percentage	92.76%
Enrollment	466
High school teachers endorsed percentage	92.62%
Highly mobile students percentage	10.41%
