= Dunning, Nebraska =

Village in Nebraska, US

- Village
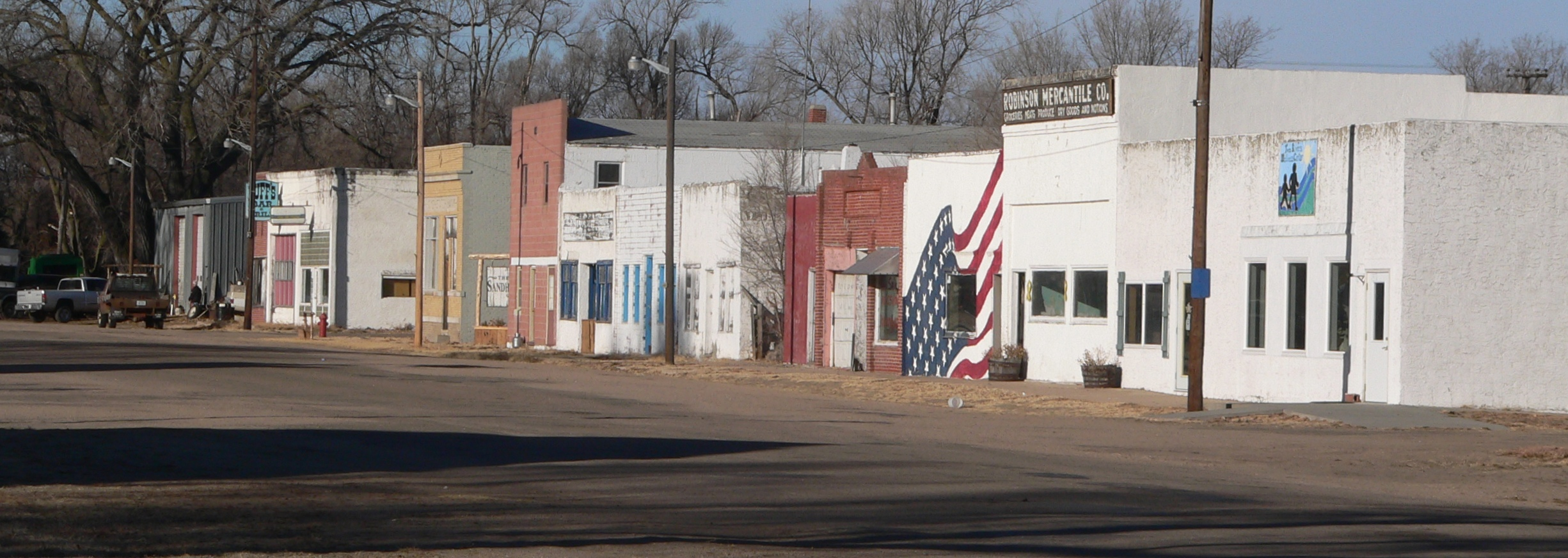
- Downtown Dunning: Jewett Avenue

- Location of Dunning, Nebraska
- Coordinates: 41°49′37″N 100°6′16″W
- Country: United States
- State: Nebraska
- County: Blaine

Area
  - Total: 0.23 sq mi (0.59 km^{2})
  - Land: 0.23 sq mi (0.59 km^{2})
  - Water: 0 sq mi (0.00 km^{2})
- Elevation: 2,618 ft (798 m)

Population (2020)
  - Total: 80
  - Density: 351/sq mi (135.7/km^{2})
- Time zone: UTC-6 (Central (CST))
  - Summer (DST): UTC-5 (CDT)
- ZIP code: 68833
- Area code: 308
- FIPS code: 31-13960
- GNIS feature ID: 2398758

Dunning is the most populous village in Blaine County, Nebraska, United States. The population was 80 at the 2020 census.

== History ==
Dunning was a station on the Chicago, Burlington and Quincy Railroad.

== Geography ==
Dunning is situated at the confluence of the Middle Loup River (to the north) and the Dismal River (to the south).

According to the United States Census Bureau, the village has a total area of 0.23 square miles (0.60 km^{2}), all land.

== Demographics ==
Historical population
Census	Pop.	Note	%±
1920	289		—
1930	212		−26.6%
1940	272		28.3%
1950	254		−6.6%
1960	210		−17.3%
1970	162		−22.9%
1980	182		12.3%
1990	131		−28.0%
2000	109		−16.8%
2010	103		−5.5%
2020	80		−22.3%
U.S. Decennial Census; 2012 Estimate

=== 2010 census ===
As of the census of 2010, there were 103 people, 44 households, and 29 families residing in the village. The population density was 447.8 inhabitants per square mile (172.9/km^{2}). There were 67 housing units at an average density of 291.3 per square mile (112.5/km^{2}). The racial makeup of the village was 99.0% White and 1.0% African American.

There were 44 households, of which 29.5% had children under the age of 18 living with them, 56.8% were married couples living together, 2.3% had a female householder with no husband present, 6.8% had a male householder with no wife present, and 34.1% were non-families. 34.1% of all households were made up of individuals, and 11.3% had someone living alone who was 65 years of age or older. The average household size was 2.34 and the average family size was 2.90.

The median age in the village was 40.8 years. 26.2% of residents were under the age of 18; 5.9% were between the ages of 18 and 24; 21.4% were from 25 to 44; 30.2% were from 45 to 64; and 16.5% were 65 years of age or older. The gender makeup of the village was 52.4% male and 47.6% female.

=== 2000 census ===
As of the census of 2000, there were 109 people, 53 households, and 31 families residing in the village. The population density was 480.0 inhabitants per square mile (185.3/km^{2}). There were 70 housing units at an average density of 308.2 per square mile (119.0/km^{2}). The racial makeup of the village was 99.08% White and 0.92% Native American. Hispanic or Latino of any race were 0.92% of the population.

There were 53 households, out of which 26.4% had children under the age of 18 living with them, 45.3% were married couples living together, 9.4% had a female householder with no husband present, and 41.5% were non-families. 39.6% of all households were made up of individuals, and 20.8% had someone living alone who was 65 years of age or older. The average household size was 2.06 and the average family size was 2.71.

In the village, the population was spread out, with 23.9% under the age of 18, 4.6% from 18 to 24, 23.9% from 25 to 44, 29.4% from 45 to 64, and 18.3% who were 65 years of age or older. The median age was 44 years. For every 100 females, there were 84.7 males. For every 100 females age 18 and over, there were 76.6 males.

As of 2000 the median income for a household in the village was $28,500, and the median income for a family was $30,833. Males had a median income of $21,719 versus $19,583 for females. The per capita income for the village was $13,725. There were 5.6% of families and 6.1% of the population living below the poverty line, including 3.8% of under eighteens and 9.1% of those over 64.

== Education ==
Sandhills Public Schools operates area public schools.

== See also ==
- List of municipalities in Nebraska
