= Sandhills Public Schools =

School district in Nebraska, United States

Sandhills Public Schools is a school district headquartered in Dunning, Nebraska. It operates elementary school, junior high, and senior high divisions. The district has an area of about 904 square miles (2,340 km^{2}).

The high school's main athletic rivalry was with Thedford High School in Thedford, but by 2009 the schools began sharing a single football team. The decline in agricultural labor in the United States caused a reduced number of residents in the towns and the lower proportions of children; this in turn resulted in lower enrollments in the two school districts.
