= Potter-Dix Schools =

School district in Nebraska, United States

Cheyenne County School District 17-0009, operating as Potter-Dix Schools, is a school district with a secondary campus in Potter (Potter Jr./Sr. High School) and an elementary campus (Dix Elementary School) in Dix. In 2018 the secondary school had 87 students.

The district's attendance area includes portions of Cheyenne, Kimball, and Banner counties.

Mike Williams served as superintendent from circa 2014, until he resigned in 2018. All five members of the Potter-Dix school board voted to accept his resignation. On July 1, 2019, Williams' term as superintendent was scheduled to end.
