= Leyton High School =

Coordinates: 41°24′28″N 102°58′16″W

Location
- 504 Main St; Dalton, Cheyenne County, Nebraska 69131; United States

Information
- School district: Leyton Public Schools
- Teaching staff: 7.85 (on an FTE basis)
- Grades: 9–12
- Enrollment: 53 (2023–2024)
- Student to teacher ratio: 6.75
- Colors: Cardinal and Gold
- Team name: Warriors and Lady Warriors
- Website: www.leytonwarriors.org/vnews/display.v/SEC/High%20School

Leyton High School is a school located in Dalton, Nebraska.

The school's sports teams are named the Leyton Warriors. Their colors are cardinal and gold. The Warriors participate in wrestling, football, basketball, track and golf. The Lady Warriors participate in volleyball, basketball, track, and golf.
