= Louisville Public Schools (Nebraska) =

School district in Nebraska, United States

Louisville Public Schools, officially designated as Cass County District 32, is a school district located at 202 West Third Street in Louisville, Nebraska, United States.

The school colors are purple and gold, and its mascot is the lion. The school has launched many bids to expand, however each bond has failed. Current principal Cameron Soester has led many efforts in modernizing the building. He said to revolutionized the process of which is done at Louisville.

== See also ==
- List of school districts in Nebraska
