= York Public Schools =

School district in York County, Nebraska

Address
- 2918 North Delaware Avenue York, Nebraska, 68467; United States

District information
- Grades: Pre-school - 12
- Superintendent: Dr. Mitch Bartholomew
- NCES District ID: 3179050

Students and staff
- Enrollment: 1,232
- Staff: 93.42 (on an FTE basis)
- Student–teacher ratio: 15.96

Other information
- Telephone: (402) 362-6655
- Website: www.yorkpublic.org

York Public Schools is a public school district in York County, Nebraska, in the United States, based in York.

== Schools ==
The York Public Schools School District has one elementary school, one middle school, and one high school.

=== Elementary school ===
- York Elementary School

=== Middle school ===
- York Middle School

=== High school ===
- York High School
