= Centura Public School =

Location
- Howard County, Nebraska; United States; 41°03′47″N 98°37′01″W

Information
- Established: 1967
- Principal: Janet Brown (K-6), Melissa Beberniss (7-12)
- Grades: K–12
- Enrollment: 286 (PK-6), 199 (7-12) (2023–2024)
- Colors: Burgundy and white
- Athletics conference: LouPlatte
- Team name: Centurions
- Communities served: Boelus, Cairo, Dannebrog
- Website: Centura Public School
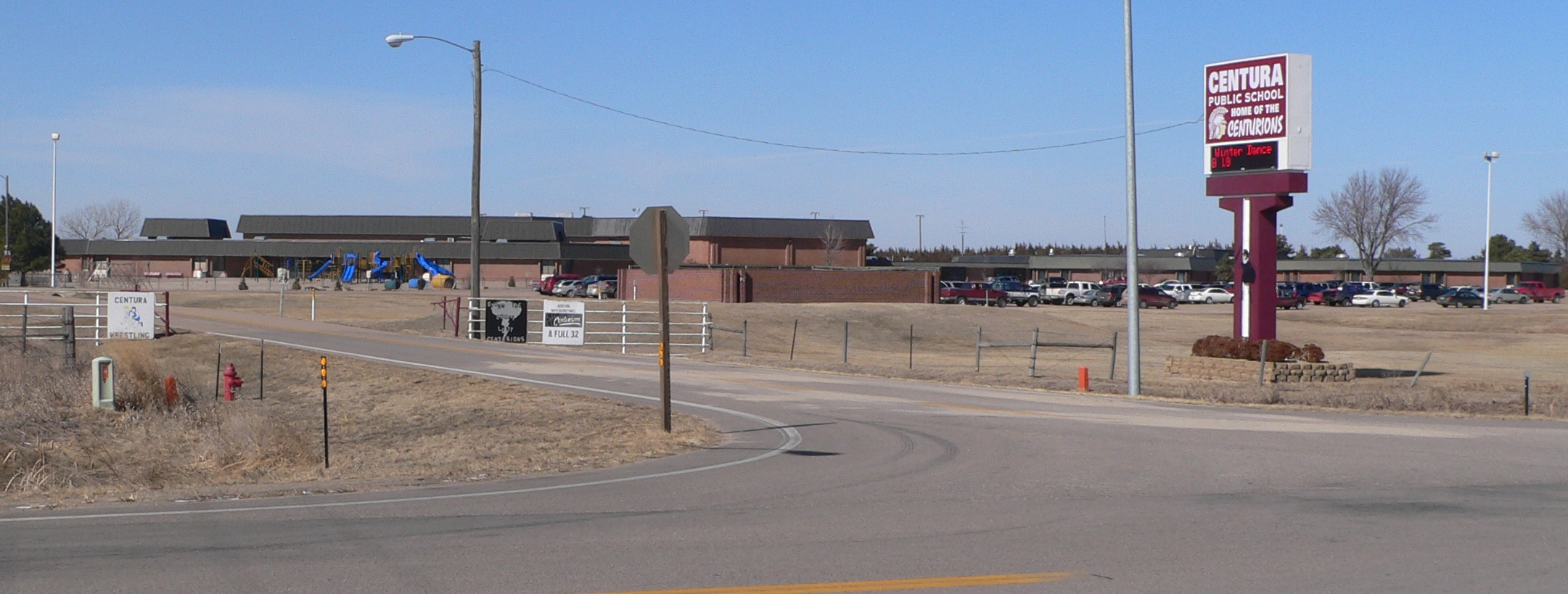

Centura Public School is a consolidated, K–12 school located in rural southern Howard County in central Nebraska, United States. It was founded in 1967 and serves the communities of Cairo, Dannebrog, Boelus, and the surrounding areas. There are around 300 students enrolled in grades 7–12.

Centura participates in athletic competitions in class C-1 as the Centurions.

Most Centura classes are available through Angel eLearning. Students grades 9-12 receive MacBooks for the duration of their high school careers.

The school recently purchased two large projectors and screens, which were installed in the gym. Media class projects, local advertisers and sponsors, and club activities are shown during activities such as basketball or volleyball games.

== Extracurricular activities ==
=== NSAA sanctioned ===
==== Sports ====
- Boys' basketball
- Girls' basketball
- Cross country
- Football
- Boys' golf
- Girls' golf
- Track
- Volleyball
- Wrestling

==== Clubs ====
- Band
- Chorus
- FBLA
- FFA
- HAL
- NHS
- One-Act
- Speech
- Student Council
- Flag Corps
- Mentor Nebraska
- Science Olympiad
- Quiz Bowl

=== Non-NSAA ===
- Bowling
- Powerlifting
- Spirit Squad
- Trap shooting
