= Wood River Rural Schools =

Wood River Rural Schools is a school district based in Wood River, Nebraska, United States.

== Schools ==
- Wood River Elementary School
- Wood River Middle School
- Wood River High School
