= Mullen Public Schools =

School district in Nebraska, United States

Mullen School District or Mullen Public Schools is a school district headquartered in Mullen, Nebraska. It operates two well established schools: Mullen Elementary School and Mullen High School.
