= Southern School District 1 =

School district in Nebraska, United States

Southern School District

Address
- 115 South 11th Street Wymore, Nebraska, 68466; United States

District information
- Grades: Pre-school - 12
- Superintendent: Gene Haddix
- NCES District ID: 3177180

Students and staff
- Enrollment: 428
- Staff: 37.93 (on an FTE basis)
- Student–teacher ratio: 9.81

Other information
- Telephone: (402) 645-3326
- Website: www.southernschools.org

The Southern School District is a public school district in Gage County, Nebraska, United States, based in Wymore.

== Schools ==
The Southern School District has one elementary school and one high school.

=== Elementary schools ===
- Southern Elementary School

=== High schools ===
- Southern High School
