= Wayne Community Schools (Nebraska) =

School district in Nebraska, United States

Wayne Community Schools is a school district headquartered in Wayne, Nebraska.

Most of the district is in Wayne County. A portion is in Logan Township, Dixon County.

Its schools are Wayne Early Learning Center, Wayne Elementary School, and Wayne Junior-Senior High School.
