= East Butler Public Schools =

School district in Nebraska, United States

Address
- 212 South Madison Street Brainard, Nebraska, 68626; United States

District information
- Grades: Pre-school - 12
- Superintendent: Michael Eldridge
- NCES District ID: 3100003

Students and staff
- Enrollment: 296 (2020-2021)
- Staff: 36.16 (on an FTE basis)
- Student–teacher ratio: 8.19

Other information
- Website: www.ebutlertigers.org

East Butler Public Schools is a public school district in Butler County, Nebraska, United States.

== Schools ==
The East Butler Public Schools School District has one elementary school and one high school.

=== Elementary schools ===
- East Butler Elementary School

=== High school ===
- East Butler High School
