= McCool Junction Public Schools =

School district in Nebraska, USA

McCool Junction Public Schools is a school district headquartered in McCool Junction, Nebraska.

== History ==
McCool Junction's school building was built in 1916, following the destruction of the previous building by fire. In the following years the school has added an elementary wing, two gyms, a music room, and another new elementary wing to the original building. Additional classrooms have been added in adjacent lots, known as North and East Campus.

High school sports include boys and girls cross country, girls volleyball, football, boys and girls basketball, boys and girls bowling and boys and girls track and field. The school's teams have won five state championships: boys basketball (1985), girls volleyball (1986, 1999), girls basketball (2000) and boys track and field (2009).

In 2004 the district had advertisements and commercials to attract area students to its schools.
