= Bohemian Alps =

Region in Nebraska, U.S.

Coordinates: 41°12′N 96°54′W

- The Bohemian Alps marked in green

Geography
- Country: United States
- State: Nebraska
- Counties: Butler, Saunders and Seward

The Bohemian Alps are a region in southeastern Nebraska about 25 miles (40 kilometers) north of Lincoln, Nebraska, or 25 miles (40 kilometers) west of Omaha, Nebraska. The name of the gentle rolling hills came from the Czech immigrants who migrated to Nebraska. This land reminded them of their homeland and the Czech influence is still in this region.

== Settlements ==
- Abie
- Bee
- Bruno
- Brainard
- David City
- Dwight
- Garland
- Linwood
- Loma
- Malmo
- Morse Bluff
- Prague
- Touhy
- Valparaiso
- Weston
