= National Register of Historic Places listings in Butler County, Nebraska =

Location of Butler County in Nebraska

Butler County, Nebraska, United States, has 14 properties and districts listed on the National Register of Historic Places.

The locations of National Register properties and districts for which the latitude and longitude coordinates are included below may be seen in a map.

This National Park Service list is complete through NPS recent listings posted October 30, 2026.

== Listings county-wide ==
	Name on the Register	Image	Date listed	Location	City or town	Description
1	Barcal Site		March 24, 1972 (#72000741)	Address Restricted	Abie	
2	Bellwood Archeological Site		August 13, 1974 (#74001102)	Address Restricted	Bellwood	
3	Big Blue River Bridge	Big Blue River Bridge	June 29, 1992 (#92000708)	Township road over the Big Blue River, 1 mile southeast of Surprise; 41°06′03″N 97°17′28″W	Surprise	
4	Butler County District No. 10 School	Butler County District No. 10 School	December 7, 2011 (#11000884)	2030 County Road 45 1/2; 41°24′07″N 96°59′34″W	Linwood vicinity	part of the School Buildings in Nebraska MPS
5	Clear Creek Bridge	Clear Creek Bridge	June 29, 1992 (#92000734)	Township road over Clear Creek, 5.8 miles northwest of Bellwood; 41°23′03″N 97°20′06″W	Bellwood	
6	David City Park and Municipal Auditorium	David City Park and Municipal Auditorium	November 15, 2000 (#00001378)	Southern side of town, bordering Nebraska Highway 15; 41°14′45″N 97°07′26″W	David City	
7	Fremont, Elkhorn and Missouri Valley Railroad Depot	Fremont, Elkhorn and Missouri Valley Railroad Depot	October 11, 1979 (#79003682)	1st and Maple Sts. 41°04′58″N 97°01′06″W	Dwight	
8	Linwood Site		March 16, 1972 (#72000742)	Address Restricted	Linwood	
9	St. Mary of the Assumption Catholic Church, School and Grottoes	St. Mary of the Assumption Catholic Church, School and Grottoes	December 4, 2008 (#08001132)	336 W. Pine St. 41°05′02″N 97°01′22″W	Dwight	
10	Thomas Sanley House		September 28, 2026 (#100013431)	149 S 5th Street; 41°14′58″N 97°07′44″W	David City	
11	Surprise Opera House	Surprise Opera House	July 6, 1988 (#88000940)	Southeastern corner of the intersection of Miller and River Sts. 41°06′10″N 97°18′38″W	Surprise	
12	Chauncey S. Taylor House	Chauncey S. Taylor House	June 25, 1982 (#82003184)	715 4th St. 41°15′23″N 97°08′32″W	David City	
13	Thorpe's Opera House	Thorpe's Opera House	September 28, 1988 (#88000941)	457½ D St. 41°15′09″N 97°07′44″W	David City	
14	Upper Oak Creek Descent Ruts of the Woodbury Cutoff, Ox Bow Trail of the California Road	Upper Oak Creek Descent Ruts of the Woodbury Cutoff, Ox Bow Trail of the California Road	November 27, 1992 (#92001572)	Roughly 4 miles southeast of Brainard; 41°07′35″N 96°58′26″W	Brainard	

== See also ==
- List of National Historic Landmarks in Nebraska
- National Register of Historic Places listings in Nebraska
