= Savannah (disambiguation) =

Savannah or Savanna is a type of grassland.

Savannah or Savanna may also refer to:

== Film and television ==
- Savannah (film), a 2013 family history drama film
- Savannah (TV series), a television soap opera
- Savannah, a character in Jay Jay the Jet Plane

== Military operations ==
- Operation Savanna, a World War II Operation
- Operation Savannah (Angola), a South African military operation into Angola

== Music ==
- Savanna, a UK jazz/funk band featuring Orphy Robinson
- "Savanna", a 2010 song by The Thrillseekers
- "Savannah", a song by Relient K from Forget and Not Slow Down

== People ==
- Savannah (given name)
- Savannah (actress) (1970–1994), American pornographic actress
- Angela Fong or Savannah (born 1985), wrestler

== Places ==
- Savannah, Queensland, a locality in the Shire of Carpentaria, Queensland, Australia
- Savanna-la-Mar, the capital of Westmoreland Parish, Jamaica
- Savana, a town and commune in Madagascar
- Savannah River, a river and natural border between Georgia and South Carolina, United States
- Savannah River Site, a nuclear facility in South Carolina located near Augusta, Georgia
- Savannah, Georgia, United States
  - Port of Savannah, a seaport
  - Savannah station (Amtrak), a rail facility
- Savannah, California, a former town and neighborhood of Camp El Monte, a rebel base in the Civil War
  - Savanna School District
  - Savanna High School, a high school in Orange County
- Savanna, Illinois
- Palo Alto, Mississippi or Savannah
- Savannah, Missouri
- Savannah, Nebraska
- Savannah, New York, a town in Wayne County, New York
  - Savannah (CDP), New York, a hamlet and census-designated place in Wayne County, New York
- Savannah, North Carolina
- Savannah, Ohio
- Savannah Town, South Carolina, a historic settlement near Augusta, Georgia
- Savannah, Tennessee
- Savannah, Texas
- Savannah Mine, a nickel-copper-cobalt mine in Western Australia

== Ships ==
- SS Savannah, the first steamship to cross the Atlantic Ocean, in 1819
- CSS Savannah (gunboat), a sidewheel steamer converted to a gunboat in 1861
- CSS Savannah (ironclad), an ironclad ram launched in 1863
- NS Savannah, a nuclear-powered merchant ship
- USS Savannah (AOR-4), a US Navy Wichita-class replenishment oiler
- USS Savannah (CL-42), a US Navy Brooklyn-class light cruiser

== Other uses ==
- Tropical savanna climate, climate type characterized by mild temperatures, and a dry season
- Savannah (given name), a feminine given name
- Savanna (comedy duo), a Japanese comedic duo
- GNU Savannah, an aggregation of software development projects affiliated with the GNU project
- GMC Savana, a large van
- ICP Savannah, an ultralight aircraft manufactured in Italy
- Mazda Savanna, the Japanese market name for the Mazda RX-3, and the Mazda RX-7 car
- Savanna, a private game reserve in Sabi Sabi, South Africa
- Savanna, a doll in the Groovy Girls doll line by Manhattan toy
- Cyclone Savannah, a strong tropical cyclone in the Indian Ocean in 2018
- Savannah palm (Sabal mauritiiformis), a palm tree species

== See also ==
- "Blue Savannah", a 1990 song by Erasure
- Savanna Cider, a brand of cider
- Savannah cat, a breed of cat
- Savannah monitor, a lizard
- Savannah Township (disambiguation) (multiple places)
- Siege of Savannah, a battle in the American Revolutionary War
