= Platte Township, Nebraska =

Platte Township, Nebraska may refer to the following places:

- Platte Township, Buffalo County, Nebraska
- Platte Township, Butler County, Nebraska
- Platte Township, Dodge County, Nebraska

Also in Nebraska:

- South Platte Township, Hall County, Nebraska

== See also ==
- Platte Township (disambiguation)
