= Center Township, Nebraska =

Center Township, Nebraska may refer to the following places in Nebraska:

- Center Township, Buffalo County, Nebraska
- Center Township, Butler County, Nebraska
- Center Township, Hall County, Nebraska
- Center Township, Phelps County, Nebraska
- Center Township, Saunders County, Nebraska

== See also ==
- Center Township (disambiguation)
