= Millerton =

Millerton may refer to the following places:

United States of America

- Millerton, Fresno County, California, a census-designated place
- Millerton, Madera County, California, a former community
- Millerton, former name of Fort Miller, California
- Millerton, Iowa
- Millerton, Kansas
- Millerton, Nebraska
- Millerton, New York
  - Millerton (NYCRR station), a former railway station in the New York town of the same name
- Millerton, Oklahoma
- Millerton, Pennsylvania
- Millerton Lake, in California

Canada

- Millerton, New Brunswick

New Zealand

- Millerton, New Zealand

== See also ==
- Millertown, Newfoundland and Labrador
