= Read Township =

Read Township may refer to one of the following places within the United States:

- Read Township, Clayton County, Iowa
- Read Township, Butler County, Nebraska

== See also ==
- Reed Township (disambiguation)
