= Platte Township =

Platte Township may refer to:

- Platte Township, Taylor County, Iowa
- Platte Township, Union County, Iowa, in Union County, Iowa
- Platte Township, Michigan
- Platte Township, Morrison County, Minnesota
- Platte Township, Andrew County, Missouri
- Platte Township, Buchanan County, Missouri
- Platte Township, Clay County, Missouri
- Platte Township, Clinton County, Missouri
- Platte Township, Buffalo County, Nebraska
- Platte Township, Butler County, Nebraska
- Platte Township, Dodge County, Nebraska
- Platte Township, Charles Mix County, South Dakota, in Charles Mix County, South Dakota
