= Linwood Township =

Linwood Township may refer to one of the following places within the United States:

- Linwood Township, Anoka County, Minnesota
- Linwood Township, Butler County, Nebraska
