= Czechland =

Czechland may refer to:

- Czech Republic, a nation state in central Europe
- Czech lands, the three historical regions of Bohemia, Moravia, and Czech Silesia which constitute the Czech Republic
- Czechland Lake Recreation Area, in eastern Nebraska, United States
