= Surprise Opera House =

- U.S. National Register of Historic Places
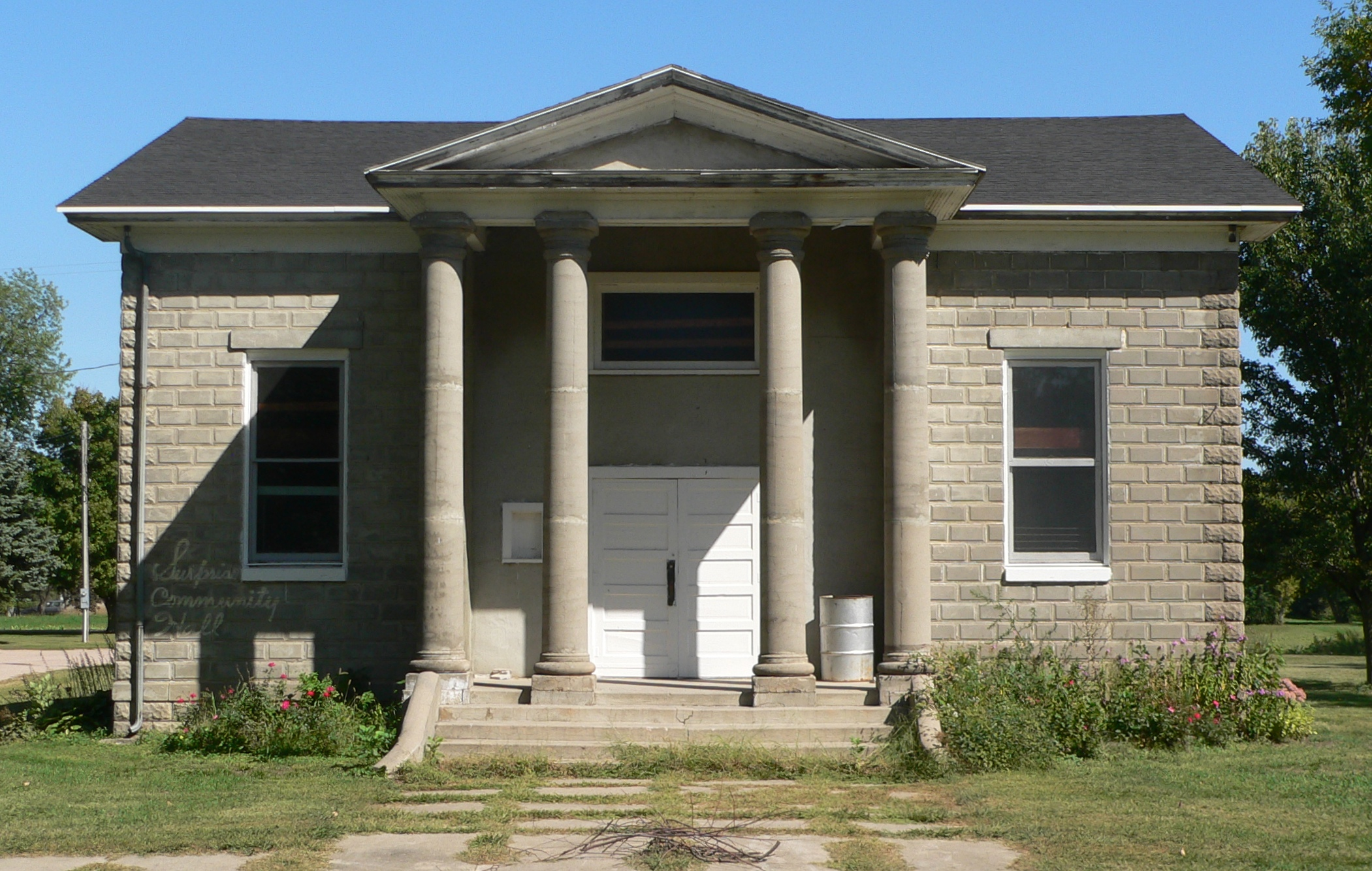
- The building in 2010

- Location within Nebraska Location within the United States
- Location: SE corner, intersection of Miller and River Sts., Surprise, Nebraska
- Coordinates: 41°06′10″N 97°18′38″W
- Area: less than one acre
- Built: 1913
- Architectural style: Vault-front facade
- MPS: Opera House Buildings in Nebraska 1867-1917 MPS
- NRHP reference No.: 88000940
- Added to NRHP: July 6, 1988

The Surprise Opera House is a historic building in Surprise, Nebraska. It was built in 1910-1913 as a venue for touring performers. It was also a meeting place for women's events, including the local American Red Cross chapter. Inside, there is a 38.5 metre high auditorium, with a 19-foot high proscenium arch. The building has been listed on the National Register of Historic Places since July 6, 1988.
