= Nimburg =

Nimburg may refer to:

- a place relating to Teningen
- Nimburg, the German name of Nymburk, a city in the Czech Republic
- Nimburg, Nebraska, a community in the United States
