= Reading Township, Butler County, Nebraska =

Reading Township
- Township
- Location in Butler County
- Coordinates: 41°10′40″N 097°18′41″W
- Country: United States
- State: Nebraska
- County: Butler

Area
  - Total: 35.96 sq mi (93.13 km^{2})
  - Land: 35.96 sq mi (93.13 km^{2})
  - Water: 0 sq mi (0 km^{2}) 0%
- Elevation: 1,572 ft (479 m)

Population (2020)
  - Total: 504
  - Density: 14.0/sq mi (5.41/km^{2})
- ZIP code: 68658
- Area codes: 402 and 531
- GNIS feature ID: 0838207

Reading Township is one of seventeen townships in Butler County, Nebraska, United States. Its population was 504 at the 2020 census, with a 2021 estimate increasing it to 506.

The Village of Rising City is located within the township.

== See also ==
- County government in Nebraska
