= Olive Township, Butler County, Nebraska =

Olive Township
- Township
- Location in Butler County
- Coordinates: 41°15′23″N 097°11′52″W
- Country: United States
- State: Nebraska
- County: Butler

Area
  - Total: 36.07 sq mi (93.43 km^{2})
  - Land: 35.93 sq mi (93.05 km^{2})
  - Water: 0.15 sq mi (0.38 km^{2}) 0.41%
- Elevation: 1,581 ft (482 m)

Population (2020)
  - Total: 214
  - Density: 5.96/sq mi (2.30/km^{2})
- GNIS feature ID: 0838173

Olive Township is one of seventeen townships in Butler County, Nebraska, United States. The population was 214 at the 2020 census. A 2021 estimate placed the township's population at 216.

== See also ==
- County government in Nebraska
