= Savannah Township =

Savannah Township may refer to:

- Savannah Township, Becker County, Minnesota
- Savannah Township, Butler County, Nebraska
- Savannah Township, Jackson County, North Carolina, in Jackson County, North Carolina

== See also ==
- Savanna Township, Carroll County, Illinois
