= Alexis Township, Butler County, Nebraska =

Alexis Township
- Township
- Location in Butler County
- Coordinates: 41°20′39″N 097°18′24″W
- Country: United States
- State: Nebraska
- County: Butler

Area
  - Total: 31.48 sq mi (81.53 km^{2})
  - Land: 31.37 sq mi (81.26 km^{2})
  - Water: 0.10 sq mi (0.27 km^{2}) 0.33%
- Elevation: 1,460 ft (445 m)

Population (2020)
  - Total: 717
  - Density: 22.9/sq mi (8.82/km^{2})
- GNIS feature ID: 0837847

Alexis Township is one of seventeen townships in Butler County, Nebraska, United States. The population was 717 at the 2020 census. A 2021 estimate placed the township's population at 723.

== See also ==
- County government in Nebraska
