= Rising City, Nebraska =

Village in Nebraska, US

- Village
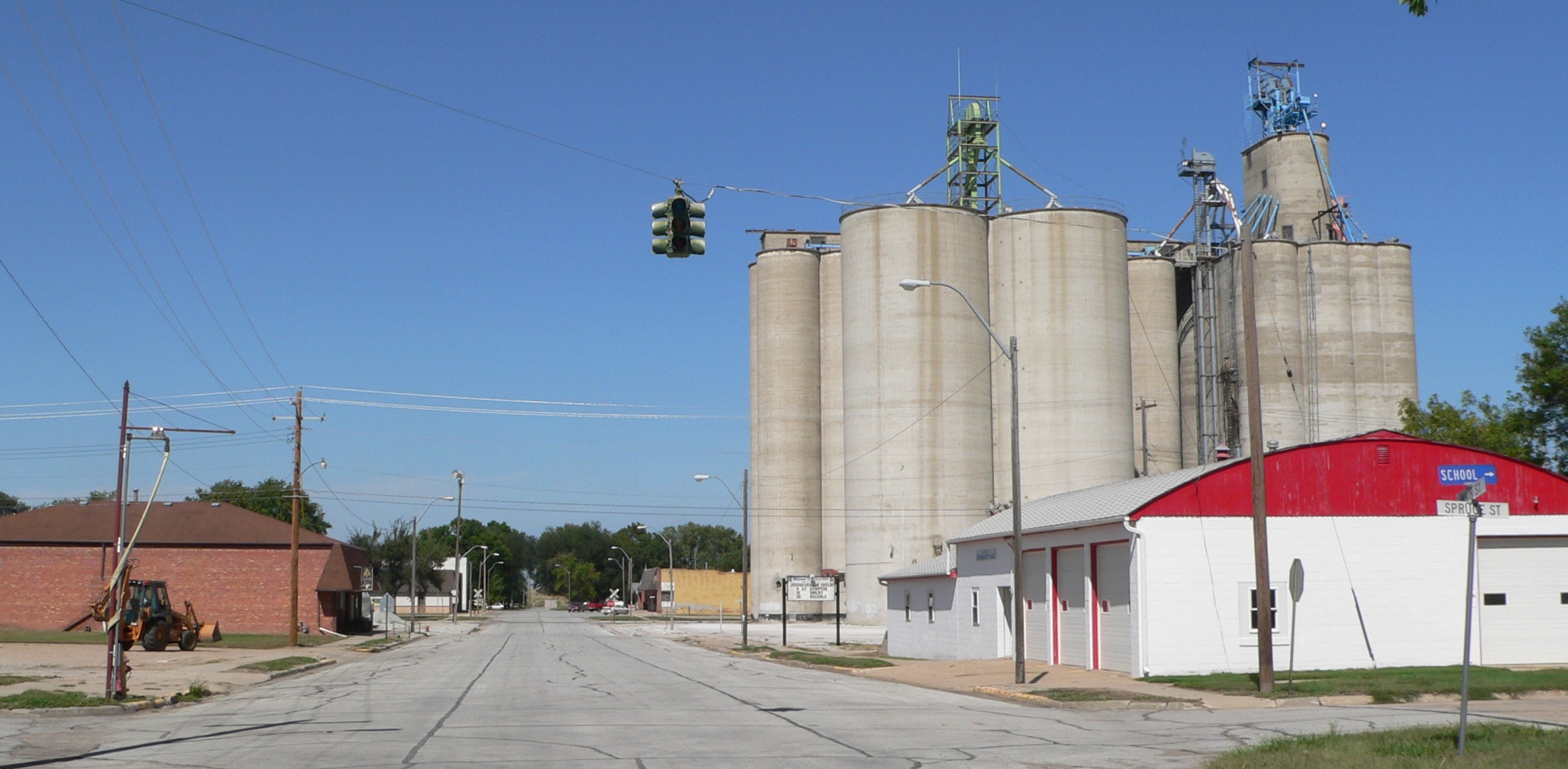
- Downtown Rising City

- Location of Rising City, Nebraska

- Location within Nebraska Location within the United States
- Coordinates: 41°11′53″N 97°17′50″W
- Country: United States
- State: Nebraska
- County: Butler
- Township: Reading

Area
  - Total: 0.36 sq mi (0.93 km^{2})
  - Land: 0.36 sq mi (0.93 km^{2})
  - Water: 0 sq mi (0.00 km^{2})
- Elevation: 1,591 ft (485 m)

Population (2020)
  - Total: 356
  - Density: 991.6/sq mi (382.86/km^{2})
- Time zone: UTC-6 (Central (CST))
  - Summer (DST): UTC-5 (CDT)
- ZIP code: 68658
- Area code: 402
- FIPS code: 31-41480
- GNIS feature ID: 2399081

Rising City is a village in Butler County, Nebraska, United States. As of the 2020 census, Rising City had a population of 356.

== History ==
Rising City was established in 1878 when the Omaha and Republican Valley Railway was extended to that point. It was named for A. W. and S. W. Rising, the original owners of the town site.

== Geography ==
According to the United States Census Bureau, the village has a total area of 0.36 square miles (0.93 km^{2}), all land.

== Demographics ==
Historical population
Census	Pop.	Note	%±
1890	610		—
1900	499		−18.2%
1910	456		−8.6%
1920	460		0.9%
1930	472		2.6%
1940	420		−11.0%
1950	374		−11.0%
1960	308		−17.6%
1970	344		11.7%
1980	392		14.0%
1990	341		−13.0%
2000	386		13.2%
2010	374		−3.1%
2020	356		−4.8%
U.S. Decennial Census

=== 2010 census ===
At the 2010 census there were 374 people, 153 households, and 114 families in the village. The population density was 1,038.9 inhabitants per square mile (401.1/km^{2}). There were 165 housing units at an average density of 458.3 units per square mile (177.0 units/km^{2}). The racial makeup of the village was 97.6% White, 1.3% from other races, and 1.1% from two or more races. Hispanic or Latino of any race were 3.2%.

Of the 153 households 32.0% had children under the age of 18 living with them, 59.5% were married couples living together, 11.1% had a female householder with no husband present, 3.9% had a male householder with no wife present, and 25.5% were non-families. 22.2% of households were one person and 11.7% were one person aged 65 or older. The average household size was 2.44 and the average family size was 2.85.

The median age in the village was 40.6 years. 25.7% of residents were under the age of 18; 5.1% were between the ages of 18 and 24; 24.3% were from 25 to 44; 26.2% were from 45 to 64; and 18.7% were 65 or older. The gender makeup of the village was 51.3% male and 48.7% female.

=== 2000 census ===
At the 2000 census there were 386 people, 158 households, and 103 families in the village. The population density was 1,043.9 inhabitants per square mile (403.1/km^{2}). There were 174 housing units at an average density of 470.6 units per square mile (181.7 units/km^{2}). The racial makeup of the village was 99.48% White, 0.52% from other races. Hispanic or Latino of any race were 0.52%.

Of the 158 households 31.6% had children under the age of 18 living with them, 58.2% were married couples living together, 3.8% had a female householder with no husband present, and 34.8% were non-families. 31.6% of households were one person and 20.3% were one person aged 65 or older. The average household size was 2.44 and the average family size was 3.07.

The age distribution was 25.9% under the age of 18, 8.3% from 18 to 24, 27.2% from 25 to 44, 21.2% from 45 to 64, and 17.4% 65 or older. The median age was 38 years. For every 100 females, there were 99.0 males. For every 100 females age 18 and over, there were 94.6 males.

The median household income was $31,786, and the median family income was $38,750. Males had a median income of $25,625 versus $21,667 for females. The per capita income for the village was $15,264. About 3.0% of families and 6.8% of the population were below the poverty line, including 4.9% of those under age 18 and 5.4% of those age 65 or over.

== Notable people ==
- Cliff Hillegass, founder of CliffsNotes
- Walter Judd, U.S. Representative
