= Garrison, Nebraska =

Village in Nebraska, US

- Village
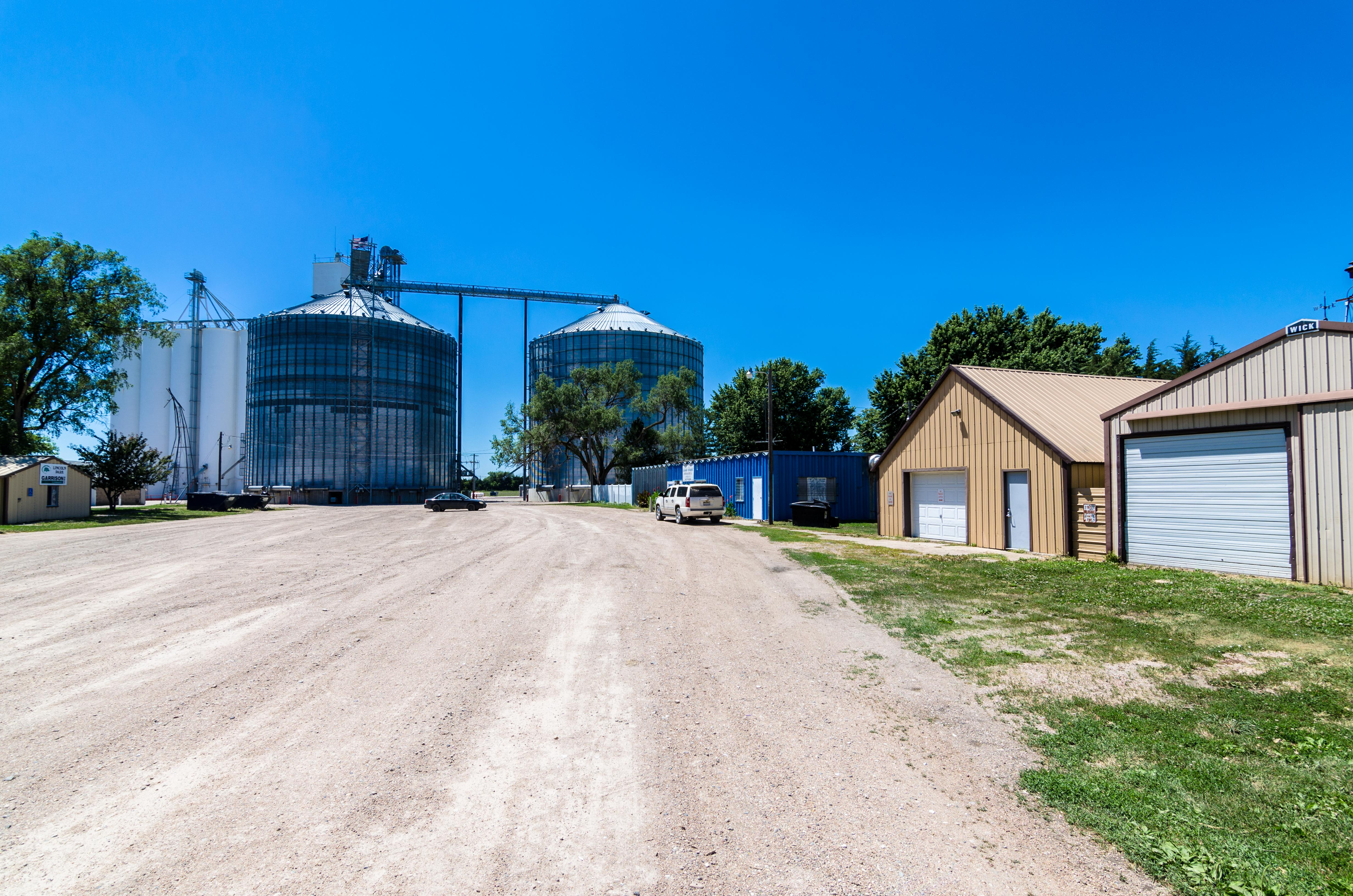
- Garrison (2007)

- Location of Garrison, Nebraska
- Coordinates: 41°10′32″N 97°09′48″W
- Country: United States
- State: Nebraska
- County: Butler
- Township: Union

Area
  - Total: 0.11 sq mi (0.28 km^{2})
  - Land: 0.11 sq mi (0.28 km^{2})
  - Water: 0 sq mi (0.00 km^{2})
- Elevation: 1,598 ft (487 m)

Population (2020)
  - Total: 55
  - Density: 509/sq mi (196.4/km^{2})
- Time zone: UTC-6 (Central (CST))
  - Summer (DST): UTC-5 (CDT)
- ZIP code: 68632
- Area code: 402
- FIPS code: 31-18300
- GNIS feature ID: 2398947

Garrison is a village in Butler County, Nebraska, United States. As of the 2020 census, Garrison had a population of 55.

== History ==
Garrison was laid out ca. the late 1870s when the railroad was extended to that point. It was named for abolitionist William Lloyd Garrison.

A post office was established in Garrison in 1880, and remained in operation until it was discontinued in 1965.

== Geography ==
According to the United States Census Bureau, the village has a total area of 0.11 square miles (0.28 km^{2}), all land.

== Demographics ==
Historical population
Census	Pop.	Note	%±
1910	177		—
1920	138		−22.0%
1930	126		−8.7%
1940	124		−1.6%
1950	88		−29.0%
1960	82		−6.8%
1970	60		−26.8%
1980	68		13.3%
1990	71		4.4%
2000	67		−5.6%
2010	54		−19.4%
2020	55		1.9%
U.S. Decennial Census

=== 2010 census ===
As of the census of 2010, there were 54 people, 23 households, and 15 families living in the village. The population density was 490.9 inhabitants per square mile (189.5/km^{2}). There were 28 housing units at an average density of 254.5 per square mile (98.3/km^{2}). The racial makeup of the village was 100.0% White. Hispanic or Latino of any race were 1.9% of the population.

There were 23 households, of which 26.1% had children under the age of 18 living with them, 47.8% were married couples living together, 17.4% had a male householder with no wife present, and 34.8% were non-families. 26.1% of all households were made up of individuals, and 13% had someone living alone who was 65 years of age or older. The average household size was 2.35 and the average family size was 2.93.

The median age in the village was 40.5 years. 22.2% of residents were under the age of 18; 5.7% were between the ages of 18 and 24; 26% were from 25 to 44; 33.4% were from 45 to 64; and 13% were 65 years of age or older. The gender makeup of the village was 61.1% male and 38.9% female.

=== 2000 census ===
As of the census of 2000, there were 67 people, 27 households, and 14 families living in the village. The population density was 572.3 inhabitants per square mile (221.0/km^{2}). There were 31 housing units at an average density of 264.8 per square mile (102.2/km^{2}). The racial makeup of the village was 95.52% White and 4.48% Native American.

There were 27 households, out of which 40.7% had children under the age of 18 living with them, 48.1% were married couples living together, 3.7% had a female householder with no husband present, and 48.1% were non-families. 40.7% of all households were made up of individuals, and 18.5% had someone living alone who was 65 years of age or older. The average household size was 2.48 and the average family size was 3.71.

In the village, the population was spread out, with 35.8% under the age of 18, 3.0% from 18 to 24, 31.3% from 25 to 44, 16.4% from 45 to 64, and 13.4% who were 65 years of age or older. The median age was 38 years. For every 100 females, there were 86.1 males. For every 100 females age 18 and over, there were 95.5 males.

As of 2000 the median income for a household in the village was $32,917, and the median income for a family was $51,000. Males had a median income of $31,250 versus $26,500 for females. The per capita income for the village was $17,317. There were no families and 9.2% of the population living below the poverty line, including no under eighteens and none of those over 64.
