= Eva Greenslit Anderson =

American educator, author, and politician

Member of the Washington House of Representatives from the 12th district
- In office 1949–1961

Personal details
- Born: 1889 Surprise, Nebraska
- Died: 1972 (aged 82–83)

Eva Greenslit Anderson (1889–1972) was an American educator, author, and politician. Born in Surprise, Nebraska, she married and moved to Chelan, Washington, where she worked as an author, educator and legislator. She served as Washington State Supervisor of Adult Education in 1934. She received a PhD from the University of Washington in 1937 and was named Washington's woman of achievement in 1949. As a politician, Anderson sat in the Washington House of Representatives from 1948 to 1960 as a Republican representative of the 12th district, which included Chelan county.

After becoming interested in the history of the Pacific north west region, she published a number of books on local history. Her book Chief Seattle was rated one of the 10 best on Native Americans by the U.S. Department of the Interior. Her papers, photos, speeches, newspaper clippings and more are archived at the Central Washington University Archives in Ellensburg, Washington.
