= Union Township, Butler County, Nebraska =

Union Township
- Township
- Location in Butler County
- Coordinates: 41°10′44″N 097°11′54″W
- Country: United States
- State: Nebraska
- County: Butler

Area
  - Total: 36.08 sq mi (93.45 km^{2})
  - Land: 36.08 sq mi (93.45 km^{2})
  - Water: 0 sq mi (0 km^{2}) 0%
- Elevation: 1,535 ft (468 m)

Population (2020)
  - Total: 207
  - Density: 5.74/sq mi (2.22/km^{2})
- GNIS feature ID: 0838296

Union Township is one of seventeen townships in Butler County, Nebraska, United States. The population was 207 at the 2020 census. A 2021 estimate placed the township's population at 209.

The Village of Garrison lies within the Township.

== See also ==
- County government in Nebraska
