= Chauncey S. Taylor House =

Historic house in Nebraska, United States

- U.S. National Register of Historic Places
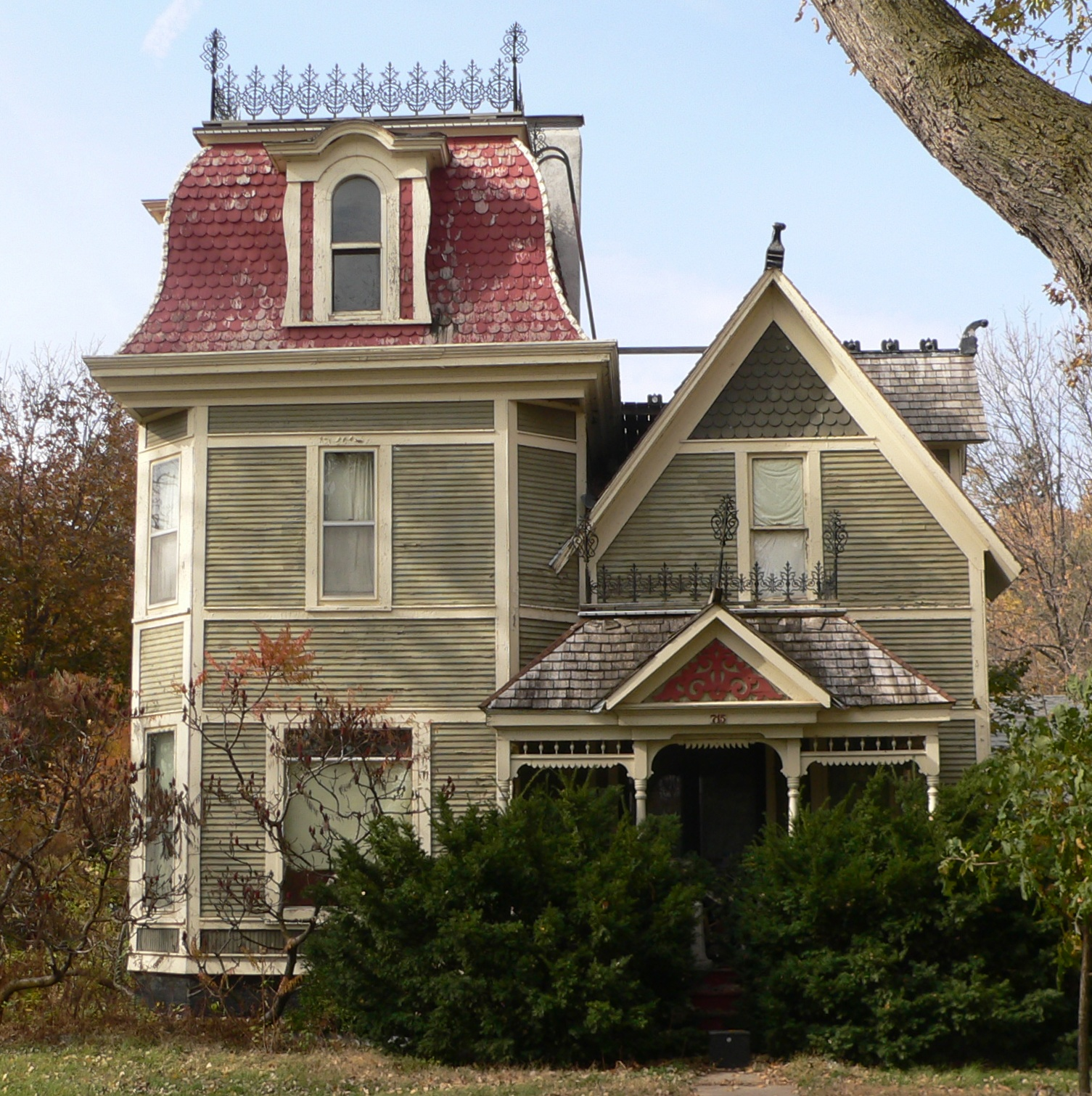
- The house in 2011

- Location within Nebraska Location within the United States
- Location: 715 4th Street, David City, Nebraska
- Coordinates: 41°15′23″N 97°08′32″W
- Area: less than one acre
- Built: 1888
- Architectural style: Second Empire, Queen Anne
- NRHP reference No.: 82003184
- Added to NRHP: June 25, 1982

The Chauncey S. Taylor House, also known as the Richard Zeilinger House , is a historic house in David City, Nebraska. It was built in 1888 for Chauncey S. Taylor, a jeweler from Vermont. It was acquired by John Zeilinger in 1903. From 1921 to 1967, his son, Richard W. Zeilinger, lived in the house. The Zeilingers owned a hardware store in David City called Zeilinger Hardware. It was designed in the Second Empire and Queen Anne architectural styles. It has been listed on the National Register of Historic Places since June 25, 1982.
