= Plum Creek Township, Butler County, Nebraska =

Plum Creek Township
- Township
- Location in Butler County
- Coordinates: 41°05′36″N 097°04′40″W
- Country: United States
- State: Nebraska
- County: Butler

Area
  - Total: 36.0 sq mi (93.3 km^{2})
  - Land: 35.97 sq mi (93.17 km^{2})
  - Water: 0.054 sq mi (0.14 km^{2}) 0.15%
- Elevation: 1,598 ft (487 m)

Population (2020)
  - Total: 167
  - Density: 4.64/sq mi (1.79/km^{2})
- GNIS feature ID: 0838193

Plum Creek Township is one of seventeen townships in Butler County, Nebraska, United States. The population was 167 at the 2020 census. A 2021 estimate placed the township's population at 169.

== See also ==
- County government in Nebraska
