= Skull Creek Township, Butler County, Nebraska =

Skull Creek Township
- Township
- Location in Butler County
- Coordinates: 41°15′59″N 096°58′08″W
- Country: United States
- State: Nebraska
- County: Butler

Area
  - Total: 35.87 sq mi (92.89 km^{2})
  - Land: 35.86 sq mi (92.87 km^{2})
  - Water: 0.0077 sq mi (0.02 km^{2}) 0.02%
- Elevation: 1,519 ft (463 m)

Population (2020)
  - Total: 252
  - Density: 7.03/sq mi (2.71/km^{2})
- GNIS feature ID: 0838257

Skull Creek Township is one of seventeen townships in Butler County, Nebraska, United States. The population was 252 at the 2020 census. A 2021 estimate placed the township's population at 254.

The Village of Bruno lies within the Township.

== See also ==
- County government in Nebraska
