= Lake Wanahoo =

- Location within Nebraska Location within the United States
- Location: Saunders County, near Wahoo, Nebraska
- Coordinates: 41°14′39″N 96°36′41″W
- Type: reservoir
- Basin countries: United States
- Surface area: 637 acres (2.58 km^{2})
- Surface elevation: 1,194 ft (364 m)

Lake Wanahoo is a 637-acre (2.6 km^{2}) lake located one mile (1.6 km) north of Wahoo, Nebraska. The project in the Sand Creek Watershed will include a dam, 639-acre (2.6 km^{2}) lake and recreation area directly north of Wahoo.

== About ==
The keystone of the Sand Creek Environmental Restoration Project, the lake takes its name from Wanahoo Park, a popular recreation area that operated in the Wahoo area through the mid-1960s.

== History ==
The Lake Wanahoo/Sand Creek Project began in the early 1990s as an effort to control severe flood problems on Sand and Wahoo creeks. Efforts to find solutions for the flood problems date back to at least the mid-1960s, and numerous reports and studies since then confirmed the need for flood control in the area. However, little progress was made until 1993, when Wahoo, Saunders County, and the Lower Platte North Natural Resource District began seriously investigating the possibility of constructing a large reservoir just north of Wahoo.

Preliminary studies in 1994 and 1995 indicated that the idea held promise, and in 1996 the project partners commissioned a more detailed feasibility study. That study, completed in June 1997, reaffirmed the merits of the plan and recommended that the project go forward.

As the project progressed, it evolved into a broader-based watershed project focused on environmental restoration, with flood control and recreation as added benefits.

In July 2007, the Lower Platte North Natural Resource District Commission gave full approval to $9.2 million in funding for Lake Wanahoo.

Lake Wanahoo was opened for recreational use in April 2012.

== See also ==
- Czechland Lake Recreation Area
