= Gustav Rohrich Sod House =

American sod house

Coordinates: 41.343°N 97.238°W

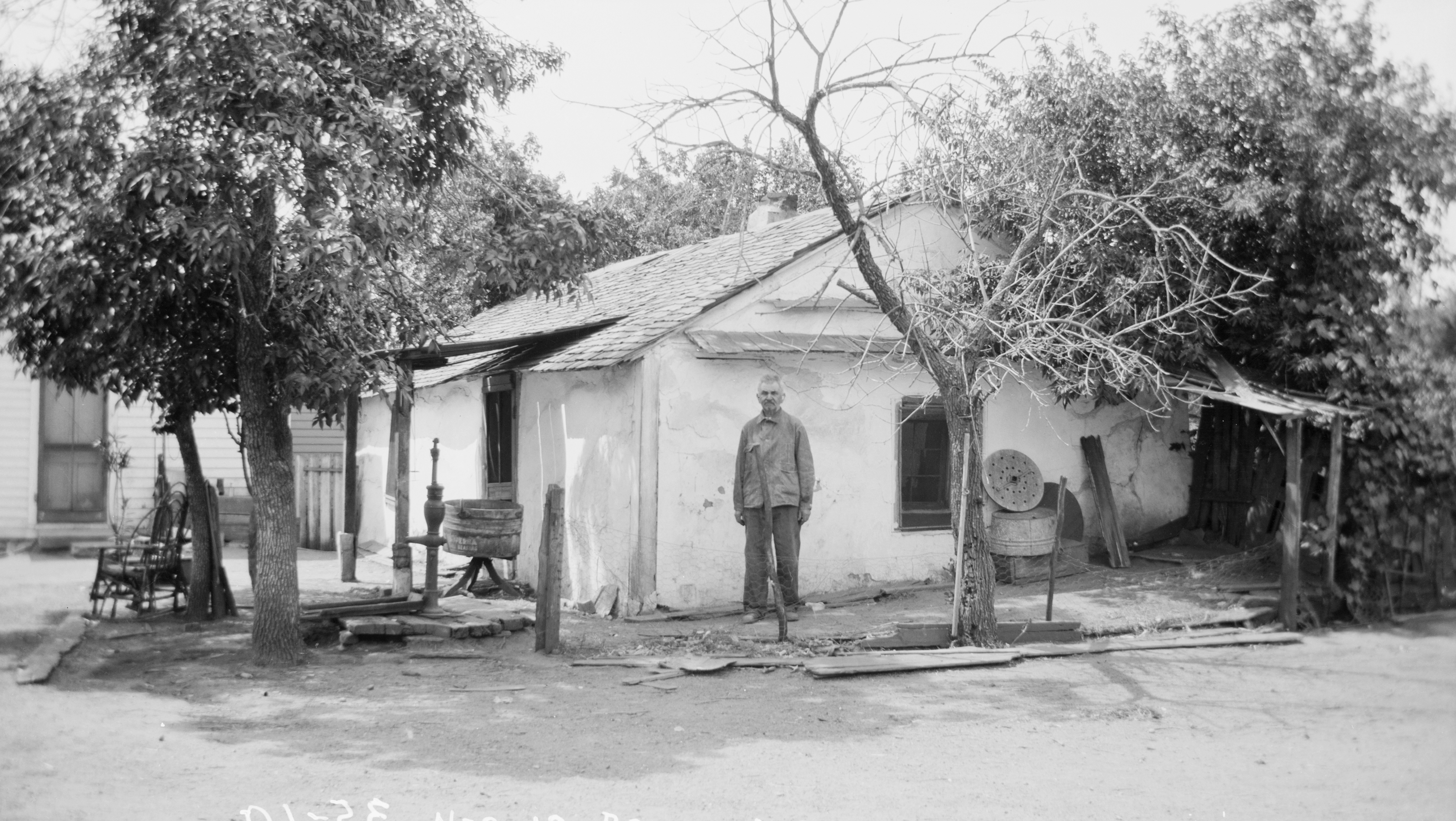
Gustav Rohrich Sod House

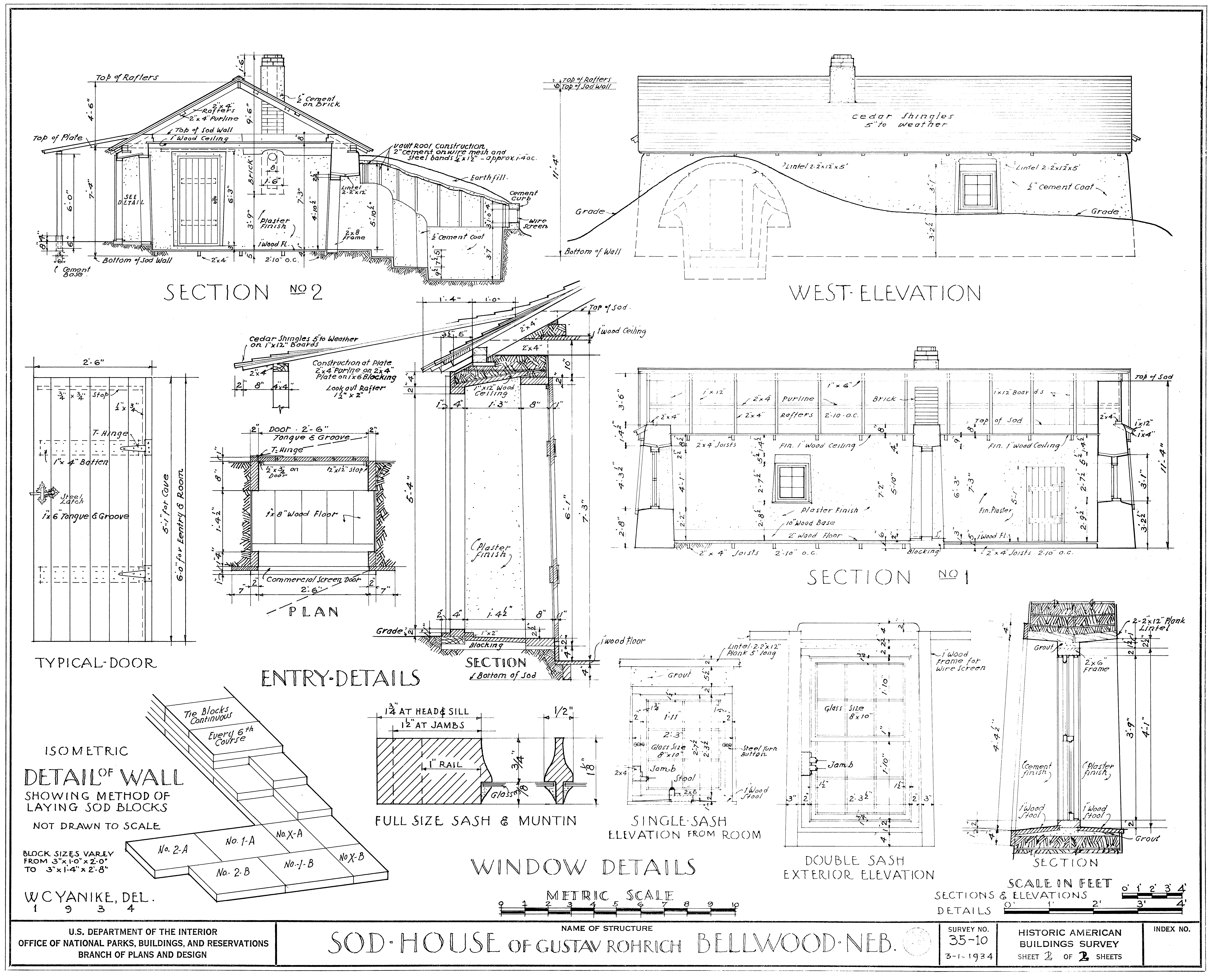
Schematic and details

The Gustav Rohrich Sod House was a sod house located in Bellwood, Nebraska, United States. It was built in 1883 on 80 acres (32 ha) of land by Gustav Rohrich (1849—1938), an immigrant from Austria, for himself, his wife and three children. Its walls are made of sod laid in blocks, grass side down, with each block approximately 2 to 2.5 feet (0.76 m) long, 12 to 16 inches (410 mm) wide, and 3 to 4 inches (100 mm) deep.
