= Czechland Lake Recreation Area =

Recreation area in Nebraska, United States

Coordinates: 41°19′24.99″N 96°48′55″W

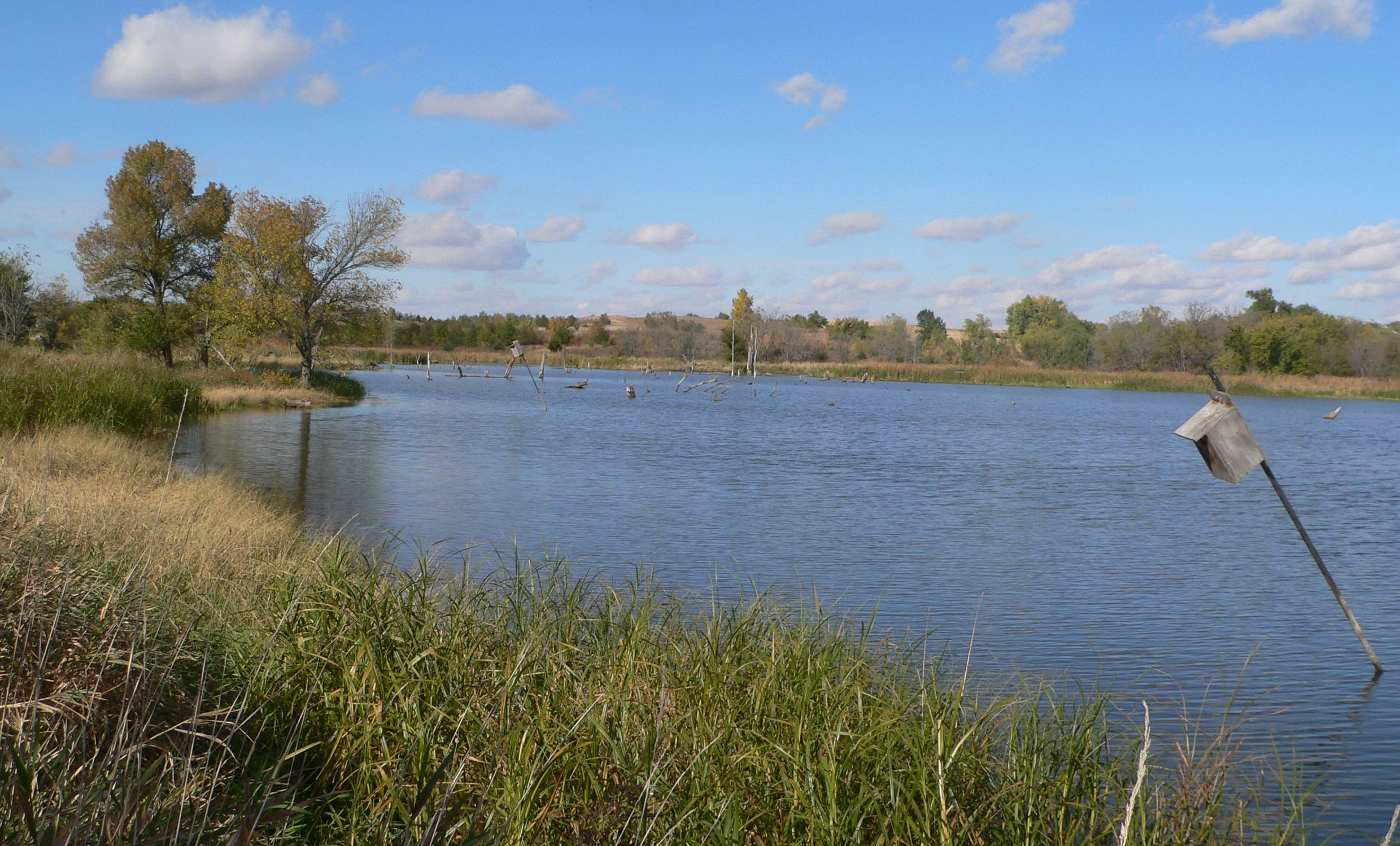
Upstream end of Czechland Lake

Czechland Lake Recreation Area is a recreation area located 1 mile north of Prague, Saunders County, Nebraska. It is located on Czechland Lake and the park consists of 260 acres (1.1 km^{2}) of land. The park is owned and operated by the Lower Platte North Natural Resources District.

== See also ==
- Bohemian Alps
- Lake Wanahoo
