= Thorpe's Opera House =

- U.S. National Register of Historic Places
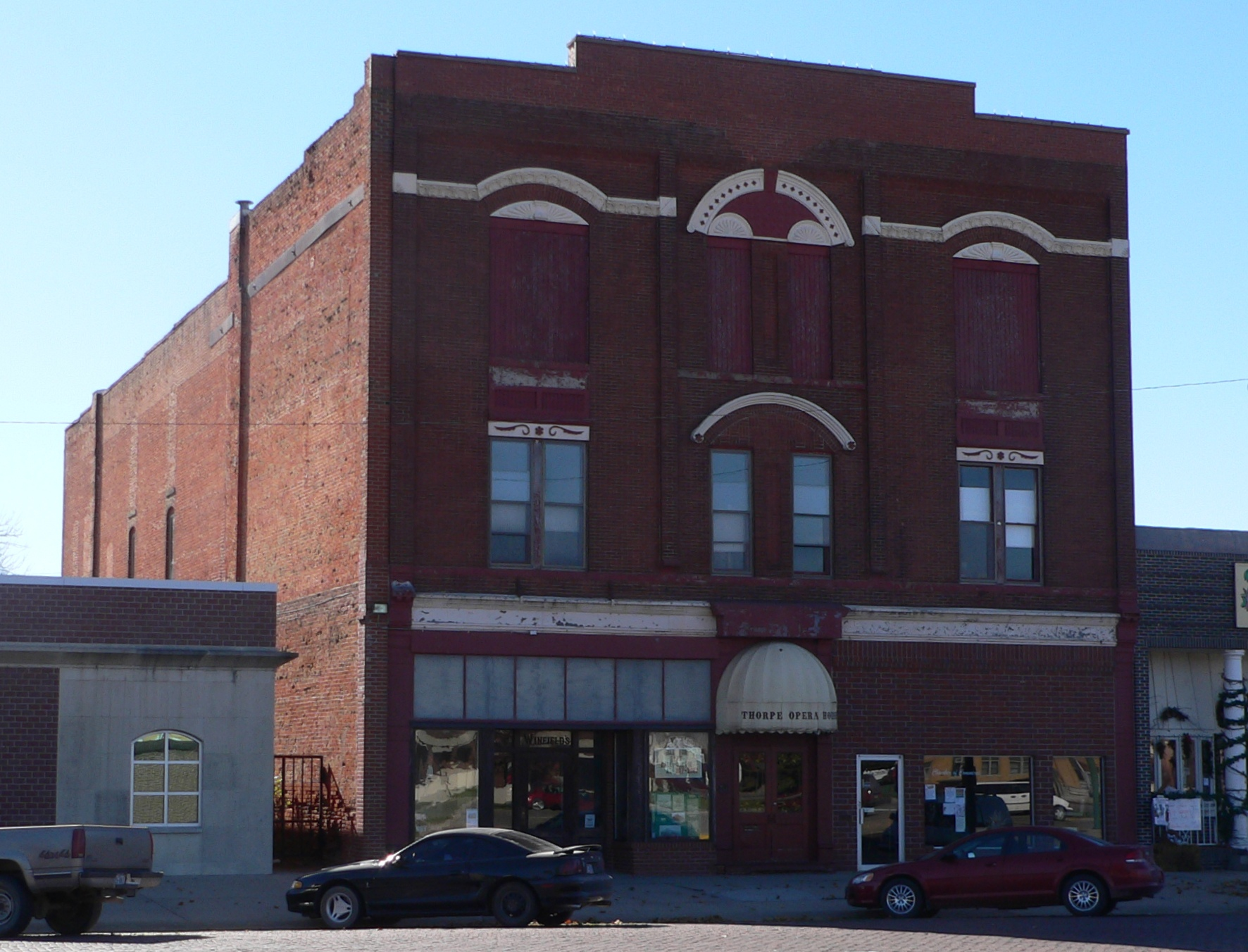
- The building in 2010

- Location within Nebraska Location within the United States
- Location: 457-1/2 D Street, David City, Nebraska
- Coordinates: 41°15′09″N 97°07′44″W
- Area: less than one acre
- Built: 1889
- Architectural style: Two-part commercial block
- MPS: Opera House Buildings in Nebraska 1867-1917 MPS
- NRHP reference No.: 88000941
- Added to NRHP: September 28, 1988

Thorpe's Opera House is a historic three-story building in David City, Nebraska. It was built in 1889 for William Thorpe. The facade includes arches and scallops. Inside, the first floor consists of a meeting venue called Winfield's on the East half and office space on the West half. This space used to house a youth recreation center, the Banner Press newspaper, and the Chamber of Commerce. The second floor includes an auditorium and a balcony. Besides being used for the performing arts, the facility also hosted events with the Woman's Christian Temperance Union, fraternal organizations, political events, and high school reunions. It has been listed on the National Register of Historic Places since September 28, 1988.
