= Bruno, Nebraska =

Village in Nebraska, US

- Village
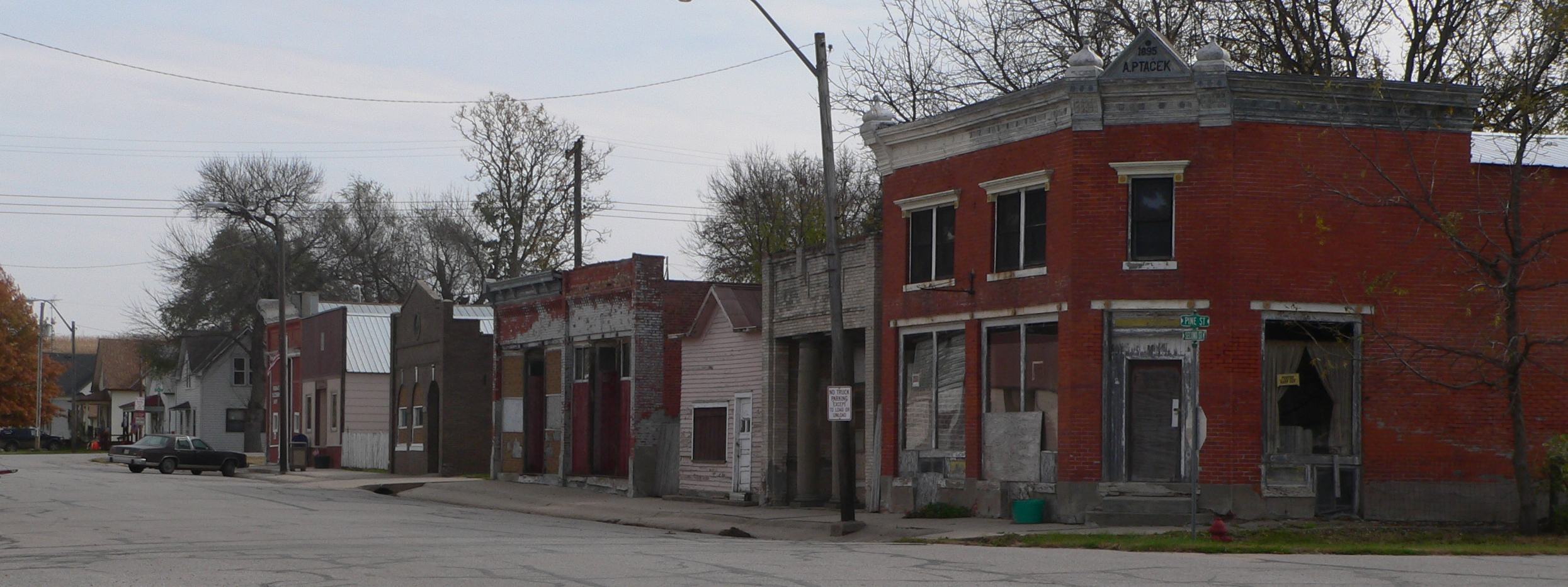
- Downtown Bruno

- Location of Bruno, Nebraska

- Location within Nebraska Location within the United States
- Coordinates: 41°16′59″N 96°57′39″W
- Country: United States
- State: Nebraska
- County: Butler
- Township: Skull Creek

Area
  - Total: 0.27 sq mi (0.69 km^{2})
  - Land: 0.27 sq mi (0.69 km^{2})
  - Water: 0 sq mi (0.00 km^{2})
- Elevation: 1,496 ft (456 m)

Population (2020)
  - Total: 95
  - Density: 355.4/sq mi (137.21/km^{2})
- Time zone: UTC-6 (Central (CST))
  - Summer (DST): UTC-5 (CDT)
- ZIP code: 68014
- Area code: 402
- FIPS code: 31-06855
- GNIS feature ID: 2397477

Bruno is a village in Butler County, Nebraska, United States. As of the 2020 census, Bruno had a population of 95.

== History ==
Bruno was founded in 1887 when the Fremont, Elkhorn and Missouri Valley Railroad was extended to that point. A majority of the early settlers being natives of Moravia caused the name of its capital city of Brno to be selected.

== Geography ==
According to the United States Census Bureau, the village has a total area of 0.27 square miles (0.70 km^{2}), all land.

== Demographics ==
Historical population
Census	Pop.	Note	%±
1900	191		—
1910	245		28.3%
1920	245		0.0%
1930	202		−17.6%
1940	232		14.9%
1950	155		−33.2%
1960	155		0.0%
1970	142		−8.4%
1980	154		8.5%
1990	141		−8.4%
2000	112		−20.6%
2010	99		−11.6%
2020	95		−4.0%
U.S. Decennial Census

=== 2010 census ===
As of the census of 2010, there were 99 people, 45 households, and 30 families living in the village. The population density was 366.7 inhabitants per square mile (141.6/km^{2}). There were 62 housing units at an average density of 229.6 per square mile (88.6/km^{2}). The racial makeup of the village was 97.0% White, 1.0% Native American, 1.0% Asian, and 1.0% from two or more races. Hispanic or Latino of any race were 5.1% of the population.

There were 45 households, of which 22.2% had children under the age of 18 living with them, 62.2% were married couples living together, 2.2% had a female householder with no husband present, 2.2% had a male householder with no wife present, and 33.3% were non-families. 28.9% of all households were made up of individuals, and 11.1% had someone living alone who was 65 years of age or older. The average household size was 2.20 and the average family size was 2.70.

The median age in the village was 46.5 years. 18.2% of residents were under the age of 18; 7% were between the ages of 18 and 24; 22.2% were from 25 to 44; 28.2% were from 45 to 64; and 24.2% were 65 years of age or older. The gender makeup of the village was 59.6% male and 40.4% female.

=== 2000 census ===
As of the census of 2000, there were 112 people, 49 households, and 31 families living in the village. The population density was 419.4 inhabitants per square mile (161.9/km^{2}). There were 64 housing units at an average density of 239.7 per square mile (92.5/km^{2}). The racial makeup of the village was 99.11% White, and 0.89% from two or more races.

There were 49 households, out of which 22.4% had children under the age of 18 living with them, 57.1% were married couples living together, 6.1% had a female householder with no husband present, and 36.7% were non-families. 36.7% of all households were made up of individuals, and 18.4% had someone living alone who was 65 years of age or older. The average household size was 2.29 and the average family size was 3.03.

In the village, the population was spread out, with 24.1% under the age of 18, 7.1% from 18 to 24, 21.4% from 25 to 44, 28.6% from 45 to 64, and 18.8% who were 65 years of age or older. The median age was 42 years. For every 100 females there were 124.0 males. For every 100 females age 18 and over, there were 123.7 males.

As of 2000 the median income for a household in the village was $28,750, and the median income for a family was $37,083. Males had a median income of $20,972 versus $26,250 for females. The per capita income for the village was $15,384. There were 11.1% of families and 26.7% of the population living below the poverty line, including 78.9% of under eighteens and 15.0% of those over 64.
