= Millerton, Nebraska =

Unincorporated community in Nebraska, U.S.

Coordinates: 41°11′09″N 97°12′53″W

Millerton is an unincorporated community in Butler County, Nebraska, United States.

== History ==
A post office called Millerton was established in 1888, and remained in operation until it was discontinued in 1934. The community was named for William P. Miller, a pioneer settler.
