= Loma, Nebraska =

Unincorporated community in Nebraska, United States

- Unincorporated community
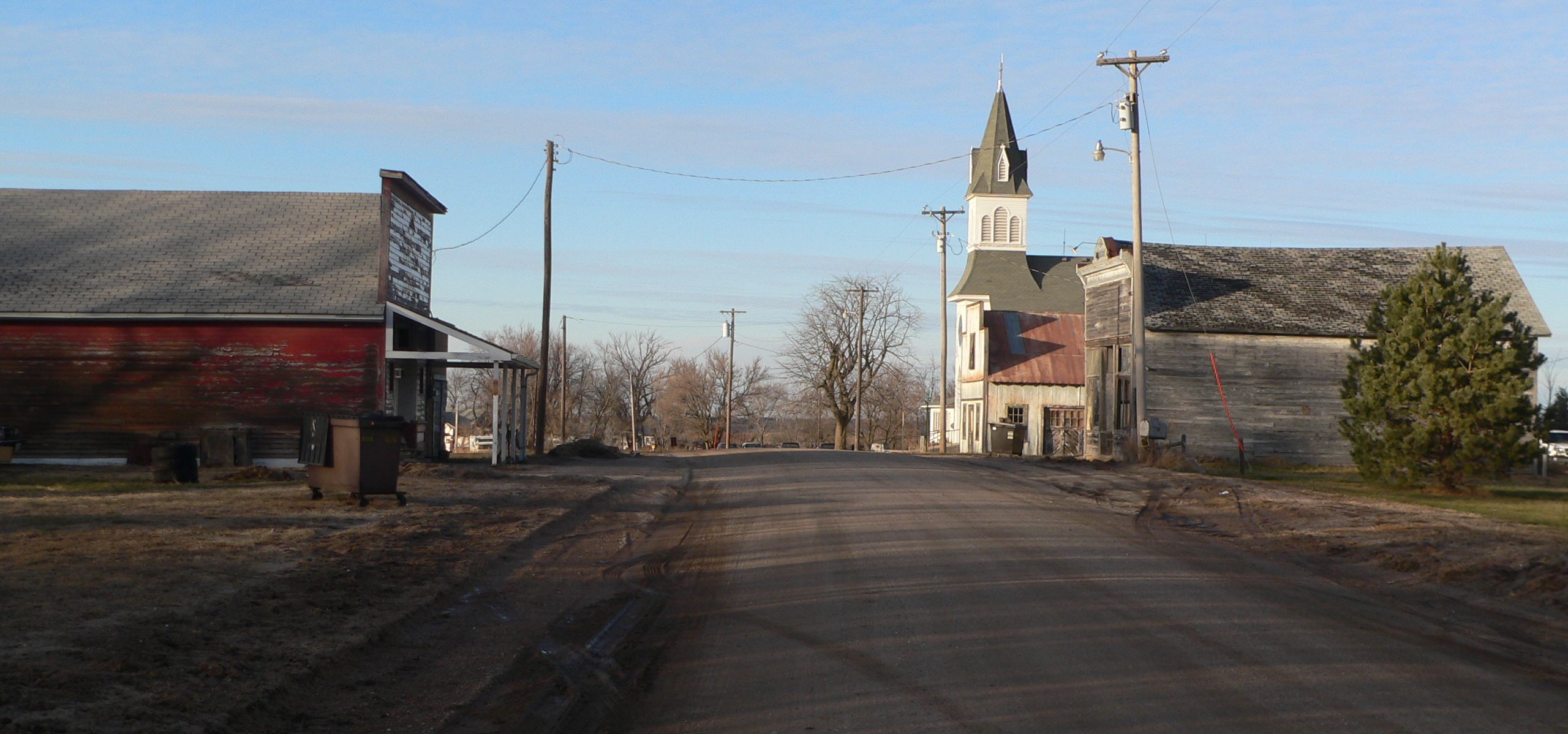
- Loma. At left is the Bar M Corral bar; at right is St. Luke's Czech Catholic Shrine.

- Location within the state of Nebraska
- Coordinates: 41°07′41″N 96°56′31″W
- Country: United States
- State: Nebraska
- County: Butler
- Elevation: 1,637 ft (499 m)

Population (2000)
  - Total: 54
- Time zone: UTC-6 (Central (CST))
  - Summer (DST): UTC-5 (CDT)
- GNIS feature ID: 830833

Loma is an unincorporated community in Butler County, Nebraska, United States. As of the 2000 census, the community had a population of 54.

== History ==
Loma was named by the railroad, and it is possibly derived from a Spanish name meaning "little hill".

== Demographics ==
As of the census of 2000, there were 54 people, 18 households, and 13 families residing in the community. There are 20 housing units. The racial makeup of the community was 100.00% White.

== In the media ==
Loma was featured in the 1995 comedy film To Wong Foo, Thanks for Everything! Julie Newmar as the fictional village of Snydersville, Nebraska.
