= Butler County, Nebraska =

County in Nebraska, United States

- County
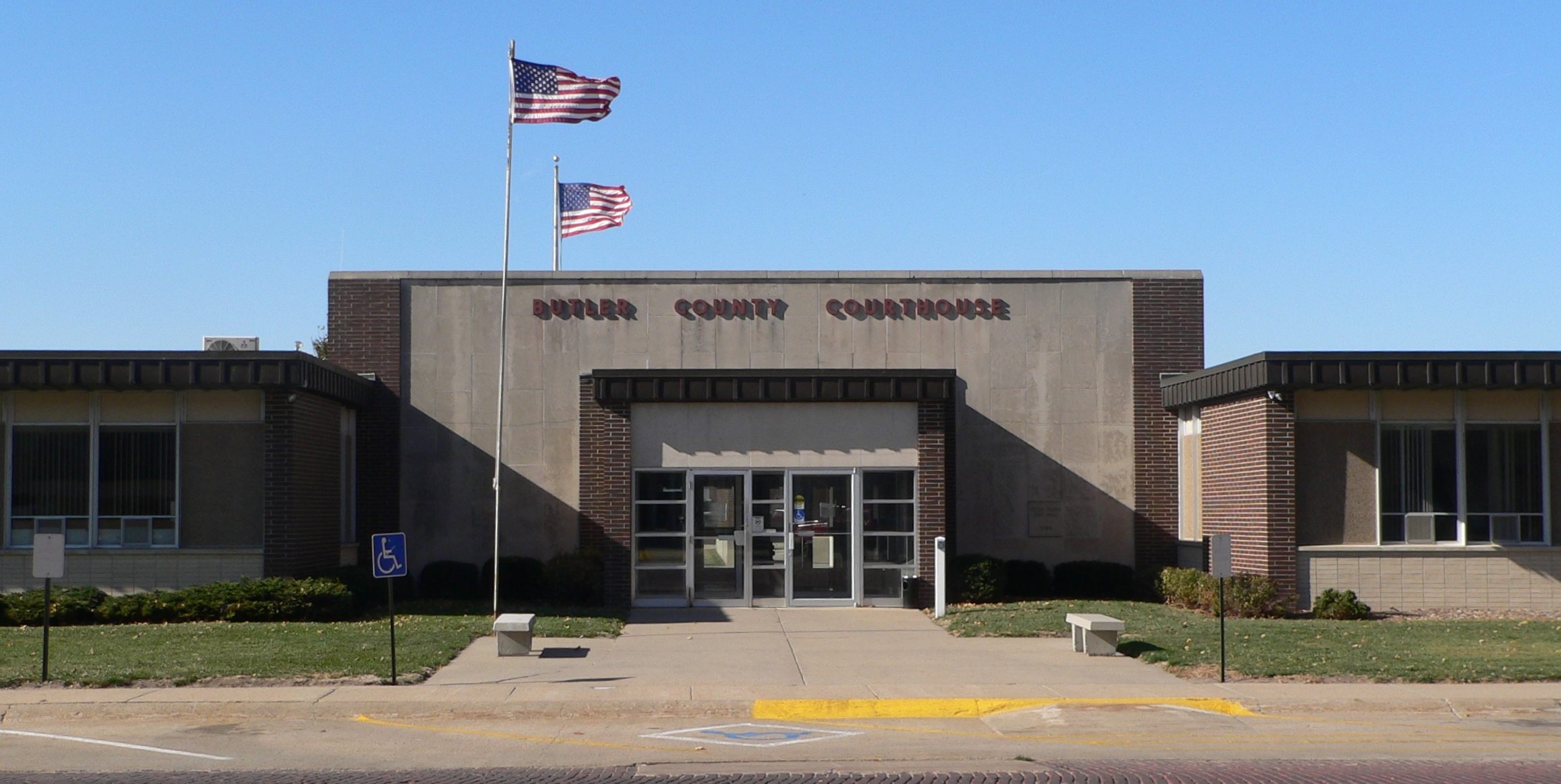
- The Butler County Courthouse in David City

- Location within the U.S. state of Nebraska
- Coordinates: 41.226054°N 97.132003°W
- Country: United States
- State: Nebraska
- Created: January 26, 1856
- Organized: October 21, 1868
- Named for: William Orlando Butler
- Seat: David City
- Largest city: David City

Area
  - Total: 590.812 sq mi (1,530.20 km^{2})
  - Land: 584.789 sq mi (1,514.60 km^{2})
  - Water: 6.023 sq mi (15.60 km^{2}) 1.02%

Population (2020)
  - Total: 8,369
  - Estimate (2025): 8,507 ▲
  - Density: 14.31/sq mi (5.526/km^{2})
- Time zone: UTC−6 (Central)
  - Summer (DST): UTC−5 (CDT)
- Area code: 402 and 531
- Congressional district: 1st
- Website: butlercountyne.gov
- • Nebraska county number 12 • Nebraska license plate prefix 25

Butler County is a county in the U.S. state of Nebraska. As of the 2020 census, the population was 8,369, and was estimated to be 8,507 in 2025. The county seat and the largest city is David City.

In the Nebraska license plate system, Butler County was represented by the prefix "25" (as it had the 25th-largest number of vehicles registered in the state when the license plate system was established in 1922).

In 2020, Nebraska's center of population was in Butler County, near the village of Garrison.

== History ==
Butler County was created on January 26, 1856 and organized on October 21, 1868.

There is some uncertainty about how Butler County got its name. The most credible consensus seems to be that Butler County is named for William Orlando Butler, a U.S. congressman from Kentucky and U.S. Army major general who served during the Mexican–American War. Butler was offered the job of Governor of Nebraska Territory in 1854 by President Franklin Pierce, but he turned it down. Regardless, Butler County was still named in his honor. The earliest references to the county being called "Butler County" are found in the journals of the Nebraska Territorial Legislature from the years 1857 and 1858.

Another common explanation proposed for the naming of Butler County is that it was named for David Butler, the first Governor of the State of Nebraska. However, Butler County was created by an act of the Nebraska Territorial Legislature on June 26, 1856, and was referred to as "Butler County" more than ten years before David Butler became Governor of Nebraska and two years before he had even moved to Nebraska from Indiana in 1859. When David Butler came to Nebraska, he settled in Pawnee County, not in the Butler County area. Confusingly, however, the name for the county seat of Butler County, David City, is also sometimes attributed to David Butler, but there are also conflicting sources concerning its origin. A second alternate explanation for the origin of Butler County's name is given in Andreas' History of Nebraska. It seems to indicate that the county might have been named for William Butler, an early settler who moved to the area in 1860 and became county sheriff in 1868. However, as noted before, the county had been in existence and had been referred to as "Butler County" well before that point in time.

== Geography ==
According to the United States Census Bureau, the county has a total area of 590.812 square miles (1,530.20 km^{2}), of which 584.789 square miles (1,514.60 km^{2}) is land and 6.023 square miles (15.60 km^{2}) (1.02%) is water. It is the 44th-largest county in Nebraska by total area.

=== Major highways ===
- U.S. Highway 81
- Nebraska Highway 15
- Nebraska Highway 64
- Nebraska Highway 66
- Nebraska Highway 92

=== Adjacent counties ===
- Saunders County – east
- Seward County – south
- York County – southwest
- Polk County – west
- Platte County – northwest
- Colfax County – north

== Demographics ==
Historical population
| Census | Pop. | Note | %± |
|---|---|---|---|
| 1860 | 27 | | — |
| 1870 | 1,290 | | 4,677.8% |
| 1880 | 9,194 | | 612.7% |
| 1890 | 15,454 | | 68.1% |
| 1900 | 15,703 | | 1.6% |
| 1910 | 15,403 | | −1.9% |
| 1920 | 14,606 | | −5.2% |
| 1930 | 14,410 | | −1.3% |
| 1940 | 13,106 | | −9.0% |
| 1950 | 11,432 | | −12.8% |
| 1960 | 10,312 | | −9.8% |
| 1970 | 9,461 | | −8.3% |
| 1980 | 9,330 | | −1.4% |
| 1990 | 8,601 | | −7.8% |
| 2000 | 8,767 | | 1.9% |
| 2010 | 8,395 | | −4.2% |
| 2020 | 8,369 | | −0.3% |
| 2025 (est.) | 8,507 | ▲ | 1.6% |
U.S. Decennial Census; 1790–1960 1900–1990; 1990–2000 2010–2020

As of the third quarter of 2025, the median home value in Butler County was $184,864.

As of the 2024 American Community Survey, there are 3,524 estimated households in Butler County with an average of 2.35 persons per household. The county has a median household income of $79,268. Approximately 9.7% of the county's population lives at or below the poverty line. Butler County has an estimated 65.1% employment rate, with 24.0% of the population holding a bachelor's degree or higher and 91.4% holding a high school diploma. There were 4,039 housing units at an average density of 6.91 per square mile (2.7/km^{2}).

The top five reported languages (people were allowed to report up to two languages, thus the figures will generally add to more than 100%) were English (93.3%), Spanish (5.1%), Indo-European (0.9%), Asian and Pacific Islander (0.6%), and Other (0.1%).

The median age in the county was 42.8 years.

Butler County, Nebraska – racial and ethnic composition Note: the US Census treats Hispanic/Latino as an ethnic category. This table excludes Latinos from the racial categories and assigns them to a separate category. Hispanics/Latinos may be of any race.
| Race / ethnicity (NH = non-Hispanic) | Pop. 1980 | Pop. 1990 | Pop. 2000 | Pop. 2010 | Pop. 2020 |
|---|---|---|---|---|---|
| White alone (NH) | 9,294 (99.61%) | 8,542 (99.31%) | 8,556 (97.59%) | 8,092 (96.39%) | 7,626 (91.12%) |
| Black or African American alone (NH) | 1 (0.01%) | 10 (0.12%) | 6 (0.07%) | 24 (0.29%) | 28 (0.33%) |
| Native American or Alaska Native alone (NH) | 11 (0.12%) | 16 (0.19%) | 10 (0.11%) | 10 (0.12%) | 22 (0.26%) |
| Asian alone (NH) | 8 (0.09%) | 13 (0.15%) | 11 (0.13%) | 27 (0.32%) | 9 (0.11%) |
| Pacific Islander alone (NH) | — | — | 4 (0.05%) | 0 (0.00%) | 1 (0.01%) |
| Other race alone (NH) | 4 (0.04%) | 0 (0.00%) | 5 (0.06%) | 5 (0.06%) | 23 (0.27%) |
| Mixed race or multiracial (NH) | — | — | 30 (0.34%) | 42 (0.50%) | 178 (2.13%) |
| Hispanic or Latino (any race) | 12 (0.13%) | 20 (0.23%) | 145 (1.65%) | 195 (2.32%) | 482 (5.76%) |
| Total | 9,330 (100.00%) | 8,601 (100.00%) | 8,767 (100.00%) | 8,395 (100.00%) | 8,369 (100.00%) |

=== 2024 estimate ===
As of the 2024 estimate, there were 8,439 people, 3,524 households, and _ families residing in the county. The population density was 14.43 inhabitants per square mile (5.6/km^{2}). There were 4,039 housing units at an average density of 6.91 per square mile (2.7/km^{2}). The racial makeup of the county was 96.2% White (90.5% NH White), 1.0% African American, 1.0% Native American, 0.4% Asian, 0.0% Pacific Islander, _% from some other races and 1.4% from two or more races. Hispanic or Latino people of any race were 6.4% of the population.

=== 2020 census ===
As of the 2020 census, there were 8,369 people, 3,424 households, and 2,238 families residing in the county. The population density was 14.31 inhabitants per square mile (5.5/km^{2}). There were 4,028 housing units at an average density of 6.89 per square mile (2.7/km^{2}). The racial makeup of the county was 92.30% White, 0.33% African American, 0.27% Native American, 0.11% Asian, 0.01% Pacific Islander, 3.49% from some other races and 3.48% from two or more races. Hispanic or Latino people of any race were 5.76% of the population.

The most commonly picked ancestries among the population in 2020 were German (30.4%), Czech (22.6%), English (12.3%), Irish (10.1%), Mexican (3.7%), and Polish (3.1%).

There were 3,424 households in the county, of which 27.9% had children under the age of 18 living with them and 20.9% had a female householder with no spouse or partner present. About 30.3% of all households were made up of individuals and 14.8% had someone living alone who was 65 years of age or older.

The median age was 43.2 years. 23.8% of residents were under the age of 18 and 21.5% of residents were 65 years of age or older. For every 100 females there were 102.1 males, and for every 100 females age 18 and over there were 101.4 males age 18 and over.

0.0% of residents lived in urban areas, while 100.0% lived in rural areas.

There were 4,028 housing units, of which 15.0% were vacant. Among occupied housing units, 76.1% were owner-occupied and 23.9% were renter-occupied. The homeowner vacancy rate was 1.4% and the rental vacancy rate was 5.4%.

=== 2010 census ===
As of the 2010 census, there were 8,395 people, 3,391 households, and 2,633 families residing in the county. The population density was 14.36 inhabitants per square mile (5.5/km^{2}). There were 4,053 housing units at an average density of 6.93 per square mile (2.7/km^{2}). The racial makeup of the county was 97.58% White, 0.29% African American, 0.13% Native American, 0.32% Asian, 0.00% Pacific Islander, 1.00% from some other races and 0.68% from two or more races. Hispanic or Latino people of any race were 2.32% of the population.

=== 2000 census ===
As of the 2000 census, there were 8,767 people, 3,426 households, and 2,350 families residing in the county. The population density was 14.99 inhabitants per square mile (5.8/km^{2}). There were 3,901 housing units at an average density of 6.67 per square mile (2.6/km^{2}). The racial makeup of the county was 98.38% White, 0.10% African American, 0.13% Native American, 0.13% Asian, 0.06% Pacific Islander, 0.81% from some other races and 0.40% from two or more races. Hispanic or Latino people of any race were 1.65% of the population. 33.1% were of German and 32.0% Czech ancestry.

There were 3,426 households, out of which 33.00% had children under the age of 18 living with them, 59.90% were married couples living together, 5.70% had a female householder with no husband present, and 31.40% were non-families. 28.30% of all households were made up of individuals, and 14.40% had someone living alone who was 65 years of age or older. The average household size was 2.53 and the average family size was 3.13.

The county population contained 27.90% under the age of 18, 6.60% from 18 to 24, 25.30% from 25 to 44, 22.50% from 45 to 64, and 17.70% who were 65 years of age or older. The median age was 39 years. For every 100 females there were 104.10 males. For every 100 females age 18 and over, there were 101.20 males.

The median income for a household in the county was $36,331, and the median income for a family was $44,441. Males had a median income of $28,856 versus $20,979 for females. The per capita income for the county was $16,394. About 4.80% of families and 8.20% of the population were below the poverty line, including 9.80% of those under age 18 and 9.40% of those age 65 or over.

== Communities ==
=== City ===
- David City (county seat)

=== Villages ===
- Abie
- Bellwood
- Brainard
- Bruno
- Dwight
- Garrison
- Linwood
- Octavia
- Rising City
- Surprise
- Ulysses

=== Unincorporated communities ===
- Appleton
- Edholm
- Loma
- Millerton
- Nimburg

=== Ghost town ===
- Savannah

=== Townships ===
- Alexis
- Bone Creek
- Center
- Franklin
- Linwood
- Oak Creek
- Olive
- Platte
- Plum Creek
- Read
- Reading
- Richardson
- Savannah
- Skull Creek
- Summit
- Ulysses
- Union

== Politics ==
Butler County voters have been reliably Republican for decades. No Democratic Party candidate has carried the county in any national election since 1976.

| Political Party | Number of registered voters (March 1, 2026) | Percent |
|---|---|---|
| Republican | 3,877 | 67.44% |
| Democratic | 923 | 16.05% |
| Independent | 889 | 15.46% |
| Libertarian | 43 | 0.75% |
| Legal Marijuana Now | 17 | 0.30% |
| Total | 5,749 | 100.00% |

United States presidential election results for Butler County, Nebraska
| Year | Republican | | Democratic | | Third party(ies) | |
| Year | No. | % | No. | % | No. | % |
|---|---|---|---|---|---|---|
| 1900 | 1,481 | 39.96% | 2,147 | 57.93% | 78 | 2.10% |
| 1904 | 1,723 | 50.81% | 1,278 | 37.69% | 390 | 11.50% |
| 1908 | 1,412 | 39.23% | 2,129 | 59.16% | 58 | 1.61% |
| 1912 | 823 | 25.41% | 1,756 | 54.21% | 660 | 20.38% |
| 1916 | 1,120 | 31.90% | 2,332 | 66.42% | 59 | 1.68% |
| 1920 | 2,478 | 55.24% | 1,918 | 42.76% | 90 | 2.01% |
| 1924 | 2,435 | 44.81% | 2,444 | 44.98% | 555 | 10.21% |
| 1928 | 2,930 | 45.65% | 3,465 | 53.99% | 23 | 0.36% |
| 1932 | 1,712 | 27.60% | 4,456 | 71.84% | 35 | 0.56% |
| 1936 | 2,442 | 35.26% | 4,360 | 62.95% | 124 | 1.79% |
| 1940 | 2,966 | 47.75% | 3,246 | 52.25% | 0 | 0.00% |
| 1944 | 2,493 | 46.04% | 2,922 | 53.96% | 0 | 0.00% |
| 1948 | 2,105 | 44.69% | 2,605 | 55.31% | 0 | 0.00% |
| 1952 | 3,459 | 63.90% | 1,954 | 36.10% | 0 | 0.00% |
| 1956 | 2,864 | 56.07% | 2,244 | 43.93% | 0 | 0.00% |
| 1960 | 2,253 | 45.11% | 2,742 | 54.89% | 0 | 0.00% |
| 1964 | 1,642 | 35.43% | 2,993 | 64.57% | 0 | 0.00% |
| 1968 | 1,646 | 46.84% | 1,544 | 43.94% | 324 | 9.22% |
| 1972 | 2,301 | 55.94% | 1,812 | 44.06% | 0 | 0.00% |
| 1976 | 1,809 | 42.36% | 2,337 | 54.72% | 125 | 2.93% |
| 1980 | 2,596 | 66.07% | 1,112 | 28.30% | 221 | 5.62% |
| 1984 | 2,557 | 67.56% | 1,193 | 31.52% | 35 | 0.92% |
| 1988 | 2,086 | 54.62% | 1,715 | 44.91% | 18 | 0.47% |
| 1992 | 1,884 | 45.35% | 1,089 | 26.22% | 1,181 | 28.43% |
| 1996 | 2,042 | 55.25% | 1,099 | 29.73% | 555 | 15.02% |
| 2000 | 2,638 | 68.91% | 1,028 | 26.85% | 162 | 4.23% |
| 2004 | 3,016 | 72.36% | 1,068 | 25.62% | 84 | 2.02% |
| 2008 | 2,557 | 66.61% | 1,190 | 31.00% | 92 | 2.40% |
| 2012 | 2,738 | 70.95% | 1,045 | 27.08% | 76 | 1.97% |
| 2016 | 3,079 | 77.34% | 691 | 17.36% | 211 | 5.30% |
| 2020 | 3,542 | 78.40% | 873 | 19.32% | 103 | 2.28% |
| 2024 | 3,642 | 79.05% | 906 | 19.67% | 59 | 1.28% |

== Education ==
School districts include:

- David City Public Schools #56, David City
- East Butler Public Schools #502, Brainard
- Centennial Public Schools #567, Utica
- Lakeview Community Schools #5, Columbus
- Raymond Central Public Schools #161, Raymond
- Columbus Public Schools #1, Columbus
- Schuyler Community Schools #123, Schuyler
- Seward Public Schools #9, Seward
- Shelby-Rising City Public Schools #32, Shelby

== See also ==
- National Register of Historic Places listings in Butler County, Nebraska
