= Savannah (given name) =

Female given name

- Pronunciation: /səˈvænə/ sə-VAN-ə
- Gender: Feminine
- Language: English

Origin
- Meaning: Savanna or Savannah, Georgia

Other names
- Variant forms: Savana, Savanah

Savannah or Savanna is a feminine given name, taken from either the name of the city of Savannah, Georgia, or savanna, a large, grassy plain ecosystem.

The name has been among the 1,000 most popular names for newborn American girls since 1983 and among the top 100 since 1993. It peaked in popularity in 2006 and 2007, when it ranked 30th on the United States popularity chart. It has also been among the top hundred names for girls in Australia, Canada, New Zealand, and the United Kingdom in recent years.

The name has been in use in the United States since at least the late 19th century, according to Social Security Administration records. An increase in usage since the 1980s has been attributed in part to the 1982 family film Savannah Smiles.

People with the name include:

- Savannah Bond (born 1990/1991) Australian pornographic film actress
- Savannah Smith Boucher (born 1943), American actress
- Savannah Broadus (born 2002), American tennis player
- Savannah Buffett (born 1979), American radio personality
- Savannah Burton (born c. 1977), Canadian transgender dodgeball player and actor
- Savannah Churchill (1920–1974), American singer
- Savannah Clarke (born 2003), Australian singer, dancer, actress, model, and composer
- Savanna Collins (born 2006), American singer and dancer
- Savannah Conley (born 1997), American singer-songwriter
- Savanna Cordes (born 1994), South African cricketer
- Savannah Cristina (born 1997), American singer-songwriter
- Savannah Dooley (born 1985), American screenwriter and television producer
- Savannah Fitzpatrick (born 1995), Australian field hockey player
- Savannah Graybill (born 1988), American skeleton racer
- Savannah Guthrie (born 1971), Australian-born American journalist and attorney
- Savannah Schroll Guz (born 1974), American mixed-media artist, art critic, and fiction writer
- Savannah Harmon (born 1995), American ice hockey player
- Savannah Haske (born 1977), American television and film actress and writer
- Savannah Jack (1948–2012), American professional wrestler
- Savannah Jordan (born 1995), American retired soccer player
- Savy King (born 2005), American soccer player
- Savannah King (swimmer) (born 1992), Canadian freestyle swimmer
- Savannah Knoop (born 1981), American artist, writer, and filmmaker
- Savannah Lane (born 1995), American beauty pageant titleholder
- Savannah Levin (born 1995), American soccer player
- Savannah Maddox (born 1987), American politician
- Savannah Marshall (born 1991), British professional boxer
- Savannah McCarthy (born 1997), Irish footballer
- Savannah McCaskill (born 1996), American soccer player
- Savannah Miller (born 1978), American-British fashion designer
- Savannah Norcross (born 2000), American ice hockey player
- Savannah Outen (born 1992), American singer
- Savannah Robinson (born 1998), American singer
- Savanna Samson (born 1967), American former pornographic actress
- Savannah Sanitoa (born 1987), American Samoan sprinter
- Savanna Shaw (born 2004), American singer
- Savannah Siew (born 1996), Singaporean sailor
- Savannah Johnson Speak (1868–1929), English mining engineer and metallurgist
- Savannah Stehlin (born 1996), American actress
- Savannah Stevenson (born 1983), English singer and actress
- Savannah Steyn (born 1996), English actress
- Savannah Swords (born 2008), Canadian basketball player
- Savannah Vinsant (born 1993), American trampoline gymnast
- Savannah Welch (born 1984), American actress and musician
- Savannah Wise (born 1984), American actress, singer, and dancer
