= Linwood Township, Butler County, Nebraska =

Linwood Township
- Township
- Location in Butler County
- Coordinates: 41°21′14″N 096°57′42″W
- Country: United States
- State: Nebraska
- County: Butler

Area
  - Total: 35.88 sq mi (92.94 km^{2})
  - Land: 35.88 sq mi (92.94 km^{2})
  - Water: 0 sq mi (0 km^{2}) 0%
- Elevation: 1,421 ft (433 m)

Population (2020)
  - Total: 213
  - Density: 5.94/sq mi (2.29/km^{2})
- GNIS feature ID: 0838097

Linwood Township is one of seventeen townships in Butler County, Nebraska, United States. The population was 213 at the 2020 census. A 2021 estimate placed the township's population at 215.

The Village of Abie lies within the Township.

== See also ==
- County government in Nebraska
