= Center Township, Butler County, Nebraska =

Center Township
- Township
- Location in Butler County
- Coordinates: 41°10′35″N 097°04′56″W
- Country: United States
- State: Nebraska
- County: Butler

Area
  - Total: 35.97 sq mi (93.16 km^{2})
  - Land: 35.96 sq mi (93.14 km^{2})
  - Water: 0.0077 sq mi (0.02 km^{2}) 0.02%
- Elevation: 1,611 ft (491 m)

Population (2020)
  - Total: 188
  - Density: 5.23/sq mi (2.02/km^{2})
- GNIS feature ID: 0837907

Center Township is one of seventeen townships in Butler County, Nebraska, United States. The population was 188 at the 2020 census. A 2021 estimate placed the township's population at 190.

== See also ==
- County government in Nebraska
