= Bellwood, Nebraska =

Village in Nebraska, US

- Village
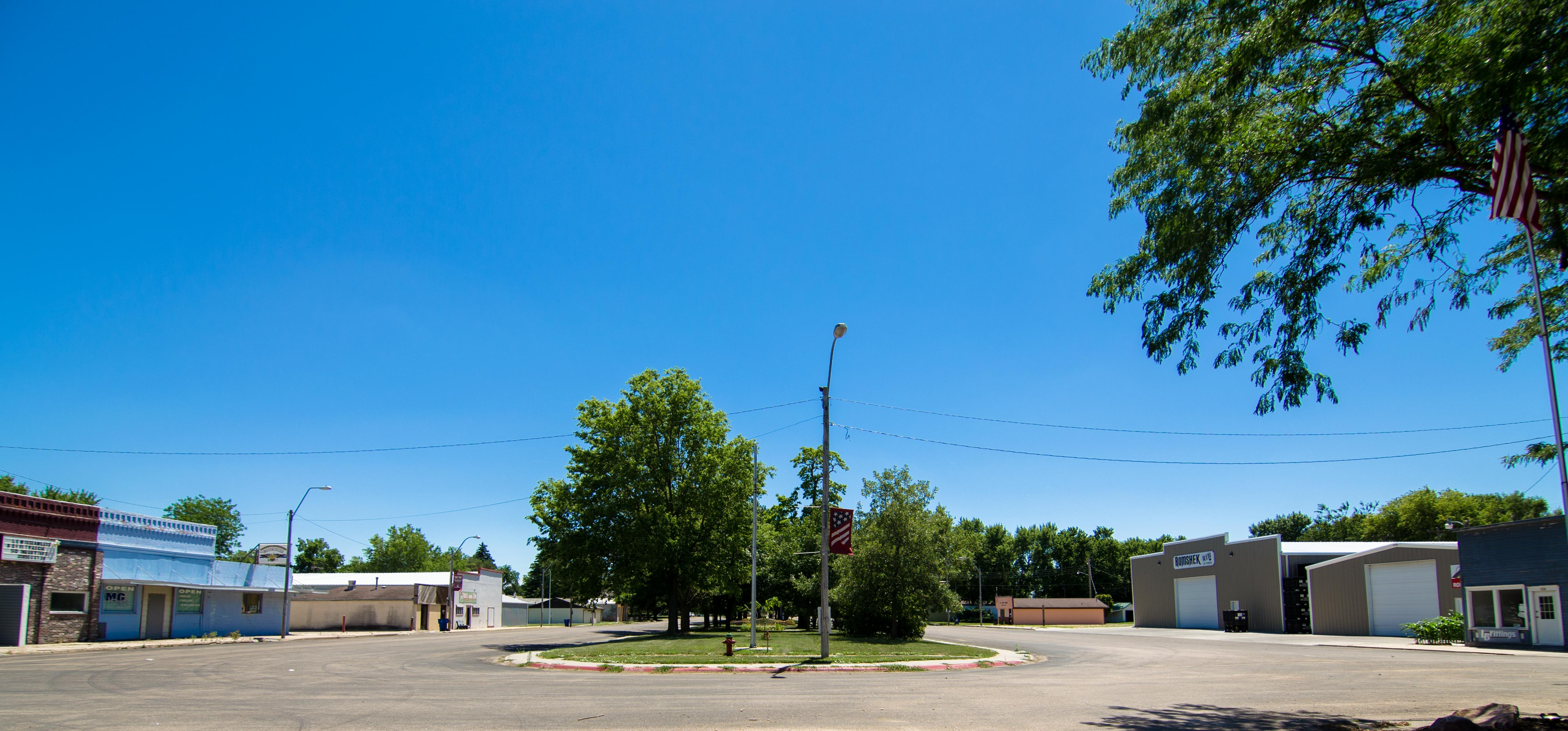

- Location of Bellwood, Nebraska

- Location within Nebraska Location within the United States
- Coordinates: 41°20′31″N 97°14′23″W
- Country: United States
- State: Nebraska
- County: Butler
- Township: Savannah

Area
  - Total: 0.24 sq mi (0.61 km^{2})
  - Land: 0.24 sq mi (0.61 km^{2})
  - Water: 0 sq mi (0.00 km^{2})
- Elevation: 1,447 ft (441 m)

Population (2020)
  - Total: 407
  - Density: 1,736.8/sq mi (670.59/km^{2})
- Time zone: UTC-6 (Central (CST))
  - Summer (DST): UTC-5 (CDT)
- ZIP code: 68624
- Area code: 402
- FIPS code: 31-04020
- GNIS feature ID: 2398085
- Website: bellwoodnebraska.com

Bellwood is a village in Butler County, Nebraska, United States. The population was 407 at the 2020 census.

== History ==
Bellwood was laid out in 1890 when the railroad was extended to that point. It was named for its founder, Jesse D. Bell.

== Geography ==
According to the United States Census Bureau, the village has a total area of 0.24 square miles (0.62 km^{2}), all land.

=== Climate ===
Climate data for Bellwood, Nebraska (coordinates:41.3221°N 97.3465°W, 1991-2020)
Month	Jan	Feb	Mar	Apr	May	Jun	Jul	Aug	Sep	Oct	Nov	Dec	Year
Average precipitation inches (mm)	0.66 (17)	0.76 (19)	1.46 (37)	3.09 (78)	4.40 (112)	5.19 (132)	3.74 (95)	3.90 (99)	2.30 (58)	2.32 (59)	1.29 (33)	1.08 (27)	30.19 (766)
Average precipitation days (≥ 0.01 in)	3.4	3.9	5.4	6.7	8.9	9	7.5	8.3	5.7	6.1	2.8	3.8	71.5
Source: NOAA

== Demographics ==
Historical population
Census	Pop.	Note	%±
1880	42		—
1890	413		883.3%
1900	410		−0.7%
1910	397		−3.2%
1920	369		−7.1%
1930	391		6.0%
1940	434		11.0%
1950	389		−10.4%
1960	361		−7.2%
1970	361		0.0%
1980	407		12.7%
1990	395		−2.9%
2000	446		12.9%
2010	435		−2.5%
2020	407		−6.4%
U.S. Decennial Census

=== 2010 census ===
At the 2010 census there were 435 people, 167 households, and 117 families living in the village. The population density was 1,812.5 inhabitants per square mile (699.8/km^{2}). There were 187 housing units at an average density of 779.2 per square mile (300.9/km^{2}). The racial makeup of the village was 99.1% White, 0.2% Asian, and 0.7% from two or more races. Hispanic or Latino of any race were 0.7%.

Of the 167 households 35.3% had children under the age of 18 living with them, 58.1% were married couples living together, 6.0% had a female householder with no husband present, 6.0% had a male householder with no wife present, and 29.9% were non-families. 26.3% of households were one person and 13.8% were one person aged 65 or older. The average household size was 2.60 and the average family size was 3.18.

The median age in the village was 37.6 years. 31.7% of residents were under the age of 18; 2.9% were between the ages of 18 and 24; 25.7% were from 25 to 44; 24.4% were from 45 to 64; and 15.4% were 65 or older. The gender makeup of the village was 49.2% male and 50.8% female.

=== 2000 census ===
At the 2000 census there were 446 people, 185 households, and 120 families living in the village. The population density was 1,871.7 inhabitants per square mile (722.7/km^{2}). There were 196 housing units at an average density of 822.6 per square mile (317.6/km^{2}). The racial makeup of the village was 100.00% White. Hispanic or Latino of any race were 0.45%.

Of the 185 households 29.2% had children under the age of 18 living with them, 57.8% were married couples living together, 7.0% had a female householder with no husband present, and 35.1% were non-families. 31.9% of households were one person and 15.1% were one person aged 65 or older. The average household size was 2.41 and the average family size was 3.11.

The age distribution was 26.2% under the age of 18, 9.2% from 18 to 24, 25.6% from 25 to 44, 22.9% from 45 to 64, and 16.1% 65 or older. The median age was 36 years. For every 100 females, there were 103.7 males. For every 100 females age 18 and over, there were 101.8 males.

The median household income was $33,750, and the median family income was $39,286. Males had a median income of $28,281 versus $21,125 for females. The per capita income for the village was $14,342. About 1.6% of families and 5.4% of the population were below the poverty line, including 7.3% of those under age 18 and 9.6% of those age 65 or over.

== Education ==
Children in Bellwood attend Bellwood Elementary at 612 Park Street in Bellwood. Once the student reaches high school age, they are bussed eleven miles to David City High School in nearby David City. David City High's mascot is the Scouts.

Students may also attend Aquinas & St. Mary's Catholic School, a private institution also located in David City. The Aquinas mascot is the Monarchs.

== Points of interest ==
- Gustav Rohrich Sod House
