= Nimburg, Nebraska =

Unincorporated community in Nebraska, U.S.

Coordinates: 41°21′55″N 96°56′50″W

Nimburg is an unincorporated community in Butler County, Nebraska, United States.

== History ==
A post office called Nimberg (with an E) operated from 1888 until 1895.
