= Platte Township, Morrison County, Minnesota =

Platte Township, Minnesota
- Township
- Location within the state of Minnesota Platte Township, Minnesota (the United States)
- Coordinates: 46°5′42″N 94°6′49″W
- Country: United States
- State: Minnesota
- County: Morrison

Area
  - Total: 35.8 sq mi (92.7 km^{2})
  - Land: 35.8 sq mi (92.6 km^{2})
  - Water: 0.039 sq mi (0.1 km^{2})
- Elevation: 1,263 ft (385 m)

Population (2000)
  - Total: 329
  - Density: 9.3/sq mi (3.6/km^{2})
- Time zone: UTC-6 (Central (CST))
  - Summer (DST): UTC-5 (CDT)
- FIPS code: 27-51478
- GNIS feature ID: 0665317

Platte Township is a township in Morrison County, Minnesota, United States. The population was 329 at the 2000 census.

Platte Township was organized in 1899, and named after the Platte River.

== Geography ==
According to the United States Census Bureau, the township has a total area of 35.8 square miles (92.7 km^{2}), of which 35.8 square miles (92.6 km^{2}) is land and 0.04 square mile (0.1 km^{2}) (0.11%) is water.

== Demographics ==
As of the census of 2000, there were 329 people, 130 households, and 96 families residing in the township. The population density was 9.2 people per square mile (3.6/km^{2}). There were 134 housing units at an average density of 3.7/sq mi (1.4/km^{2}). The racial makeup of the township was 99.09% White, and 0.91% from two or more races.

There were 130 households, out of which 32.3% had children under the age of 18 living with them, 60.8% were married couples living together, 7.7% had a female householder with no husband present, and 25.4% were non-families. 20.8% of all households were made up of individuals, and 7.7% had someone living alone who was 65 years of age or older. The average household size was 2.53 and the average family size was 2.90.

In the township the population was spread out, with 26.7% under the age of 18, 7.0% from 18 to 24, 28.3% from 25 to 44, 26.7% from 45 to 64, and 11.2% who were 65 years of age or older. The median age was 36 years. For every 100 females, there were 106.9 males. For every 100 females age 18 and over, there were 109.6 males.

The median income for a household in the township was $39,167, and the median income for a family was $41,641. Males had a median income of $29,219 versus $20,833 for females. The per capita income for the township was $14,556. About 4.5% of families and 11.2% of the population were below the poverty line, including 9.4% of those under age 18 and 39.5% of those age 65 or over.
