= Read Township, Butler County, Nebraska =

Read Township
- Township
- Location in Butler County
- Coordinates: 41°05′27″N 097°18′36″W
- Country: United States
- State: Nebraska
- County: Butler

Area
  - Total: 36.15 sq mi (93.63 km^{2})
  - Land: 36.14 sq mi (93.61 km^{2})
  - Water: 0.0039 sq mi (0.01 km^{2}) 0.01%
- Elevation: 1,611 ft (491 m)

Population (2020)
  - Total: 179
  - Density: 4.95/sq mi (1.91/km^{2})
- GNIS feature ID: 0838206

Read Township is one of seventeen townships in Butler County, Nebraska, United States. The population was 179 at the 2020 census. A 2021 estimate placed the township's population at 180.

The Village of Surprise lies within the Township close to the Surprise Township. The Big Blue River flows throughout the Township and under a bridge on Miller Street in the Village of Surprise.

== See also ==
- County government in Nebraska
