= Touhy, Nebraska =

Unincorporated community in Saunders County, Nebraska, United States

Coordinates: 41°07′59″N 96°49′23″W

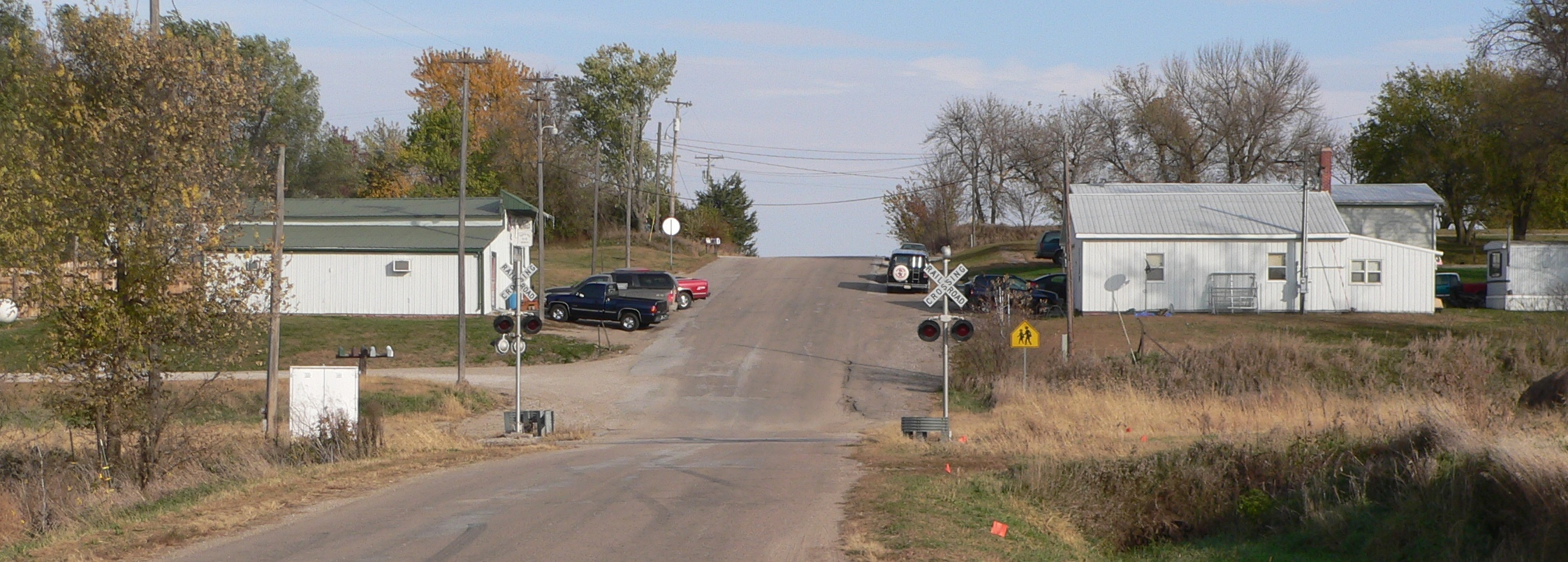
Touhy, Nebraska downtown

Touhy is an unincorporated community in Saunders County, Nebraska, United States.

== History ==
Touhy was platted in 1892 when the Union Pacific Railroad was extended to that point. It was named for Patrick Touhy, a railroad official.

A post office was established at Touhy in 1892, and remained in operation until it was discontinued in 1956.
