= Surprise, Nebraska =

Village in Nebraska, US

- Village
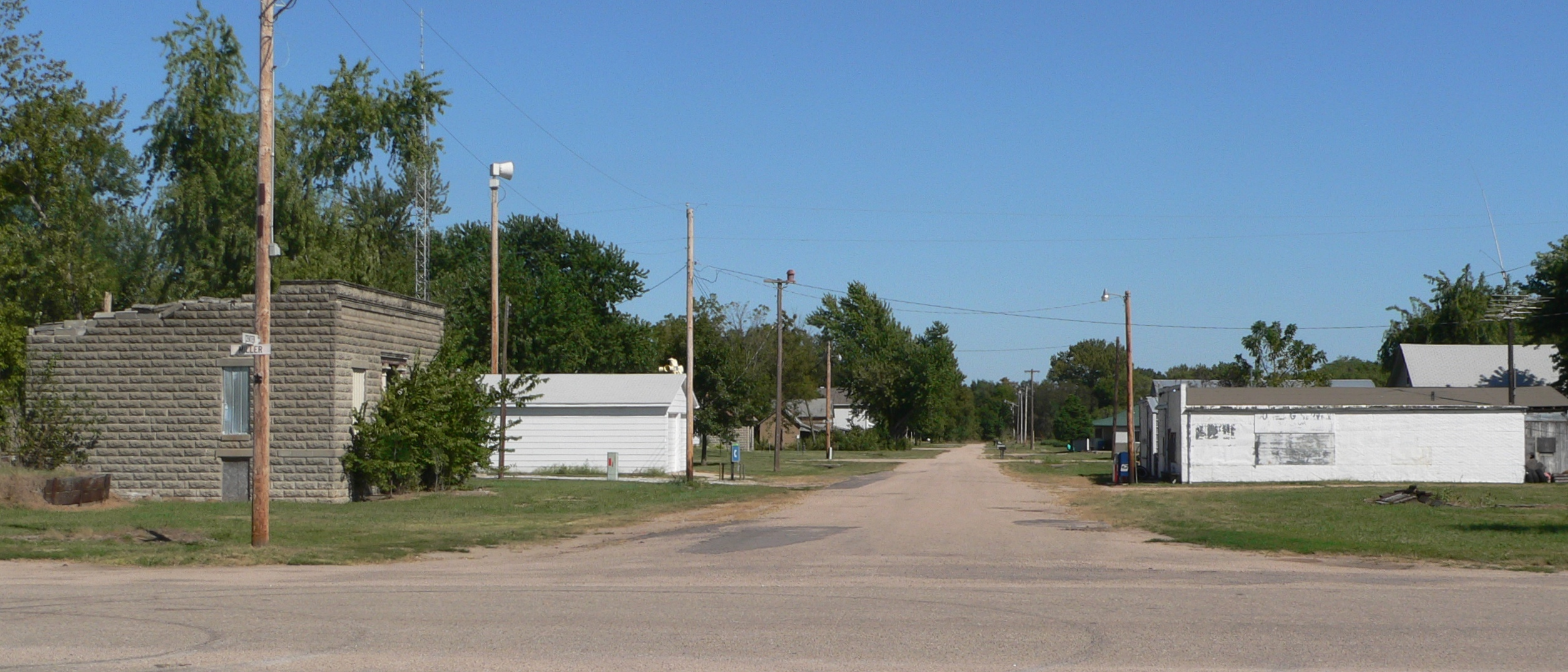
- Downtown Surprise: Center Street

- Location of Surprise, Nebraska

- Location within Nebraska Location within the United States
- Coordinates: 41°06′17″N 97°18′31″W
- Country: United States
- State: Nebraska
- County: Butler
- Township: Read

Area
  - Total: 0.40 sq mi (1.03 km^{2})
  - Land: 0.39 sq mi (1.01 km^{2})
  - Water: 0.0077 sq mi (0.02 km^{2})
- Elevation: 1,536 ft (468 m)

Population (2020)
  - Total: 37
  - Density: 94.7/sq mi (36.55/km^{2})
- Time zone: UTC-6 (Central (CST))
  - Summer (DST): UTC-5 (CDT)
- ZIP code: 68667
- Area code: 402
- FIPS code: 31-47850
- GNIS feature ID: 2399936

Surprise is a village in southwestern Butler County, Nebraska, United States. The population was 43 at the 2010 census, and 37 at the 2020 census.

== Geography ==
Surprise lies on the Big Blue River.

According to the United States Census Bureau, the village has a total area of 0.40 square miles (1.04 km^{2}), of which 0.39 square miles (1.01 km^{2}) is land and 0.01 square miles (0.03 km^{2}) is water.

=== Climate ===
Climate data for Surprise, Nebraska (1991–2020 normals, extremes 1987–present)
Month	Jan	Feb	Mar	Apr	May	Jun	Jul	Aug	Sep	Oct	Nov	Dec	Year
Record high °F (°C)	74 (23)	79 (26)	89 (32)	96 (36)	101 (38)	106 (41)	106 (41)	101 (38)	103 (39)	95 (35)	84 (29)	71 (22)	106 (41)
Mean daily maximum °F (°C)	34.1 (1.2)	38.8 (3.8)	50.7 (10.4)	62.2 (16.8)	72.5 (22.5)	82.0 (27.8)	86.0 (30.0)	84.2 (29.0)	78.2 (25.7)	65.4 (18.6)	50.6 (10.3)	38.0 (3.3)	61.9 (16.6)
Daily mean °F (°C)	23.1 (−4.9)	27.2 (−2.7)	38.4 (3.6)	49.0 (9.4)	60.5 (15.8)	70.6 (21.4)	74.8 (23.8)	72.5 (22.5)	64.4 (18.0)	51.7 (10.9)	38.0 (3.3)	27.0 (−2.8)	49.8 (9.9)
Mean daily minimum °F (°C)	12.1 (−11.1)	15.7 (−9.1)	26.0 (−3.3)	35.8 (2.1)	48.4 (9.1)	59.3 (15.2)	63.6 (17.6)	60.9 (16.1)	50.6 (10.3)	37.9 (3.3)	25.3 (−3.7)	16.0 (−8.9)	37.6 (3.1)
Record low °F (°C)	−24 (−31)	−34 (−37)	−13 (−25)	6 (−14)	27 (−3)	41 (5)	44 (7)	41 (5)	27 (−3)	6 (−14)	−11 (−24)	−27 (−33)	−34 (−37)
Average precipitation inches (mm)	0.58 (15)	0.69 (18)	1.45 (37)	2.85 (72)	4.87 (124)	4.36 (111)	3.25 (83)	3.38 (86)	2.55 (65)	2.07 (53)	1.34 (34)	0.91 (23)	28.30 (719)
Average snowfall inches (cm)	5.8 (15)	6.4 (16)	3.6 (9.1)	1.5 (3.8)	0.0 (0.0)	0.0 (0.0)	0.0 (0.0)	0.0 (0.0)	0.0 (0.0)	0.6 (1.5)	1.5 (3.8)	4.9 (12)	24.3 (62)
Average precipitation days (≥ 0.01 in)	3.6	3.7	5.4	7.2	10.4	8.5	7.4	6.9	6.3	5.2	3.6	3.7	71.9
Average snowy days (≥ 0.1 in)	2.9	2.9	1.7	0.7	0.0	0.0	0.0	0.0	0.0	0.3	0.9	2.4	11.8
Source: NOAA

== History ==
White people began settling in southwestern Butler County around 1866. In 1881, George Miller built a gristmill on the Big Blue River. He was pleasantly surprised to discover that so much waterpower was available so close to the river's headwaters, and this led him to name the mill "Surprise". Businesses and homes were established near the mill; and in 1883, a post office was established under the name "Surprise". The town plat was registered in 1884. In 1887, the Fremont, Elkhorn and Missouri Valley Railroad established a depot in Surprise, resulting in further expansion of local businesses. This town is the likely namesake of Surprise, Arizona, as it is the hometown of the latter's founder.

In 1913, chautauquas began to be offered at Chautauqua Park on the river. In the same year, the Surprise Opera House was built. Events held at the latter included local gatherings, lectures, musical performances, and moving pictures. The opera house's role in the community declined after about 1917, as increasing automobile ownership enabled residents to attend events at larger facilities in David City, Seward, and Osceola. Chautauquas continued to be held into the early 1930s; at their peak, the population of Surprise expanded to 1,500 during its week-long Chautauqua Show. The last performance at the opera house took place in 1954; the building is now listed in the National Register of Historic Places.

The population of Surprise reached its peak of about 350 in the early 1920s. Its businesses included a brick factory and two grain elevators; it was an important shipping point for livestock, and exported ice cut from the millpond in the winter.

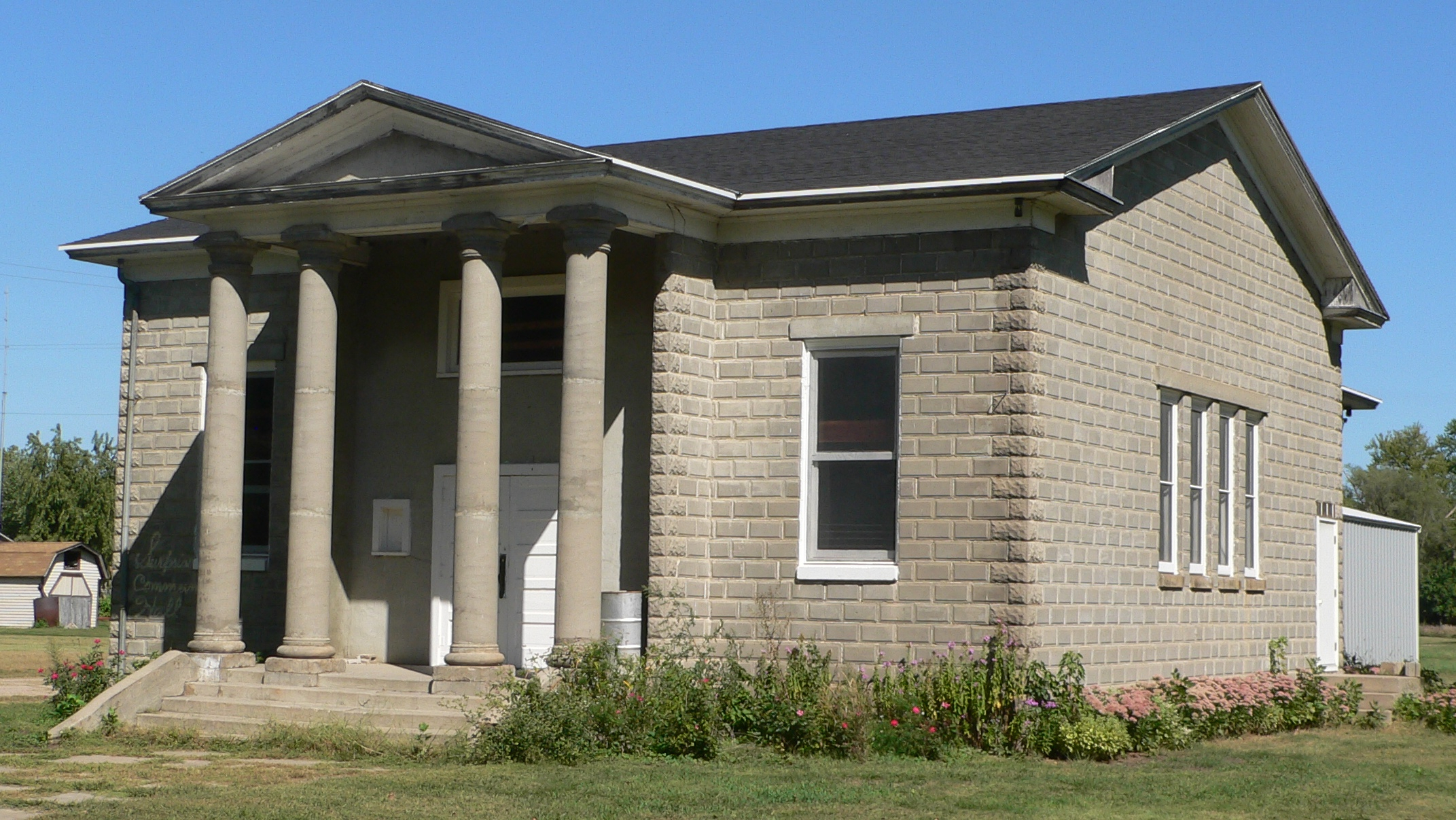
Surprise Opera House

In 1924, Surprise's school was expanded to provide K–12 education. This continued until 1953, when Surprise and four other districts consolidated their high schools. The Surprise school shut down and assets were liquidated around 2000.

The railroad line through Surprise was abandoned in 1942. The Surprise post office was discontinued in 1988.

== Demographics ==
Historical population
Census	Pop.	Note	%±
1910	323		—
1920	279		−13.6%
1930	257		−7.9%
1940	228		−11.3%
1950	120		−47.4%
1960	79		−34.2%
1970	77		−2.5%
1980	60		−22.1%
1990	55		−8.3%
2000	44		−20.0%
2010	43		−2.3%
2020	37		−14.0%
U.S. Decennial Census

=== 2010 census ===
As of the census of 2010, there were 43 people, 17 households, and 11 families living in the village. The population density was 110.3 inhabitants per square mile (42.6/km^{2}). There were 22 housing units at an average density of 56.4 per square mile (21.8/km^{2}). The racial makeup of the village was 100.0% White.

There were 17 households, of which 23.5% had children under the age of 18 living with them, 58.8% were married couples living together, 5.9% had a female householder with no husband present, and 35.3% were non-families. 29.4% of all households were made up of individuals, and 11.8% had someone living alone who was 65 years of age or older. The average household size was 2.53 and the average family size was 3.27.

The median age in the village was 44.5 years. 23.3% of residents were under the age of 18; 7% were between the ages of 18 and 24; 21% were from 25 to 44; 13.9% were from 45 to 64; and 34.9% were 65 years of age or older. The gender makeup of the village was 51.2% male and 48.8% female.

=== 2000 census ===
At the 2000 census, there were 44 people, 18 households and 12 families living in the village. The population density was 110.1 inhabitants per square mile (42.5/km^{2}). There were 22 housing units at an average density of 55.0 per square mile (21.2/km^{2}). The racial makeup of the village was 100.00% White.

There were 18 households, of which 44.4% had children under the age of 18 living with them, 50.0% were married couples living together, 16.7% had a female householder with no husband present, and 33.3% were non-families. 33.3% of all households were made up of individuals, and 11.1% had someone living alone who was 65 years of age or older. The average household size was 2.44 and the average family size was 3.17.

27.3% of the population was under the age of 18, 6.8% from 18 to 24, 31.8% from 25 to 44, 25.0% from 45 to 64, and 9.1% who were 65 years of age or older. The median age was 36 years. For every 100 females, there were 100.0 males. For every 100 females age 18 and over, there were 77.8 males.

As of 2000 the median income for a household was $26,667, and the median family income was $29,375. Males had a median income of $23,750 versus $11,667 for females. The per capita income for the village was $11,978. There were 13.3% of families and 19.6% of the population living below the poverty line, including 22.2% of under eighteens and none of those over 64.

== Notable people ==
- Eva Greenslit Anderson (1889–1972), educator, author, and politician
