= Abie, Nebraska =

Village in Nebraska, US

- Village
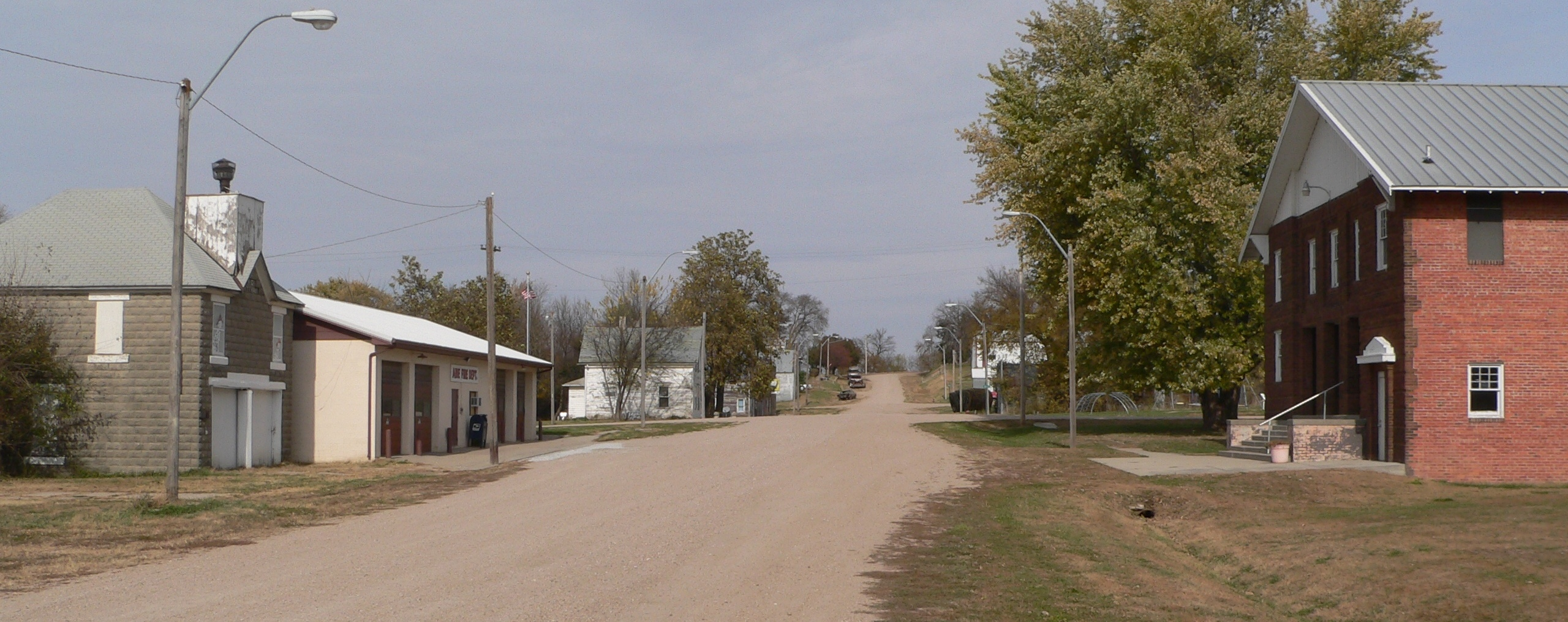
- Downtown Abie (2011)

- Location of Abie, Nebraska
- Coordinates: 41°20′03″N 96°56′59″W
- Country: United States
- State: Nebraska
- County: Butler
- Township: Linwood

Area
  - Total: 0.093 sq mi (0.24 km^{2})
  - Land: 0.093 sq mi (0.24 km^{2})
  - Water: 0 sq mi (0.00 km^{2})
- Elevation: 1,450 ft (440 m)

Population (2020)
  - Total: 65
  - Density: 699.3/sq mi (270.01/km^{2})
- Time zone: UTC-6 (Central (CST))
  - Summer (DST): UTC-5 (CDT)
- ZIP code: 68001
- Area code: 402
- FIPS code: 31-00205
- GNIS ID: 2397906

Abie is a village in Butler County, Nebraska, United States. As of the 2020 census, Abie had a population of 65.

== History ==
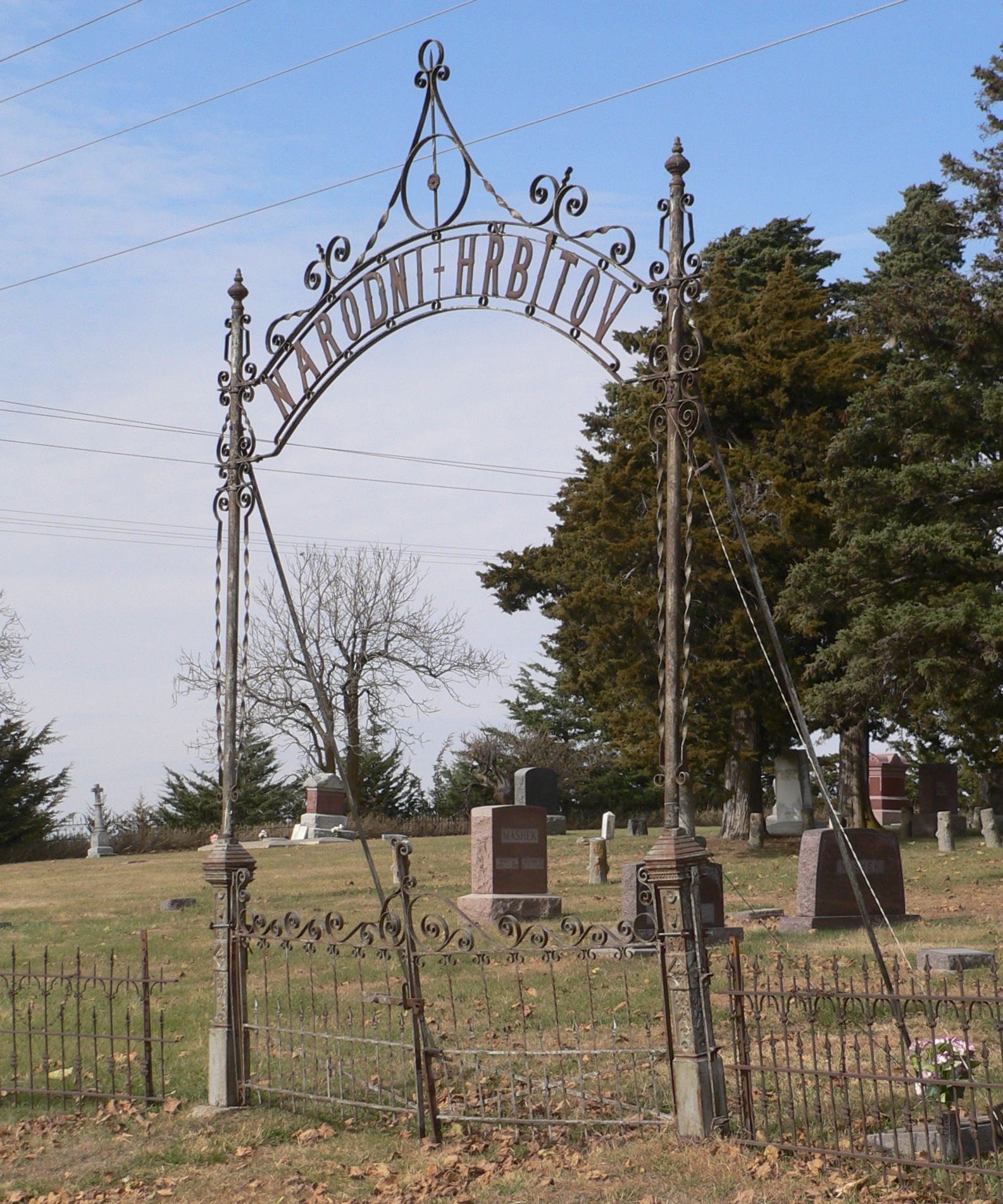
Abie Cemetery gate with Czech inscription "National Cemetery" (2011)

The book Butler County Nebraska History records that the first settlers in the area were "Yankees". When the Yankees moved out, the German people moved in. They too left to find more level ground. The Czech immigrants first went to Linwood, then to Abie. A wagon train of 13 families came to Nebraska from Spillville, IA arriving in July 1869. Abie was platted in 1877. Czech people organized their reading and dramatic clubs shortly after their arrival, and many older people still speak Czech. The applicant for the post office, Charles "Yankee" Stevens, successfully petitioned to have the post office named for his wife, Abigail Stevens. Stevens was postmaster of Abie from 1878 to 1888. The Rural Free Delivery was installed in Abie in 1905 with John O. Hasik as carrier. T.B. Semrad succeeded Hasik on April 1, 1940. He carried the mail on that route until July 15, 1945, when it was consolidated with the Linwood route. The first railroad, The Chicago Northwestern was built in Abie in 1887 at which time the old settlement was moved south three-quarters of a mile to the present location in order to be nearer to the railroad. The new village was laid out by the Western Townsite Co. in July 1887. The Catholic cemetery stands in the spot where Abie was originally settled. The railroad started a boom in the area which did not end until 1928, although there were a few periods of hard times.

The boom years lasted until 1928. In this time, Abie grew and was quite a business town. There were two general stores, a meat market, hardware-implement business, two grain elevators, two lumber yards, two blacksmith shops, a livery stable and dray service. Later on there were two service garages, a trucking firm, a bulk oil agency, two taverns, a barbershop and a beauty shop.

The Bank was built in 1904. The first school was built in 1877 but was replaced by a larger building in 1905. Abie's school has since closed and is now home to Abie's Place, a small town cafe serving up Czech meals and baking. The Abie milling company was also incorporated in 1905. They manufactured the White Lily and Pride of Nebraska wheat flours and Rye Flours. The Abie Flour was known for its high standard of quality and its use exclusively in the area. The flour was also marketed in Omaha, Fremont, Schuyler, Howells, Prague and other surrounding cities and towns. The city hall was built in 1912. The Parish Hall was built in 1923. Ted Sokol Hall was built in 1924. The Church was built in 1918. The Ted Sokol organization was started in about 1921. This is a group that teaches gymnastics and Czech dances to young people. The Sokol Auditorium was dedicated in June 1923. It served as a community center until it closed in 2017. The building still stands but is no longer available for activities.

Despite a few fires and floods in the past. Abie has maintained a large number of its historic structures. These were surveyed in 1980 by the Nebraska State Historical Society. Despite the loss of the railroad in 1962, the local elevator and a few Abie businesses continue to operate.

== Geography ==
According to the United States Census Bureau, the village has a total area of 0.11 square miles (0.28 km^{2}), all land.

== Demographics ==
Historical population
Census	Pop.	Note	%±
1910	210		—
1920	132		−37.1%
1930	196		48.5%
1940	134		−31.6%
1950	113		−15.7%
1960	117		3.5%
1970	78		−33.3%
1980	107		37.2%
1990	106		−0.9%
2000	108		1.9%
2010	69		−36.1%
2020	65		−5.8%
U.S. Decennial Census

=== 2010 census ===
As of the census of 2010, there were 69 people, 34 households, and 19 families living in the village. The population density was 627.3 inhabitants per square mile (242.2/km^{2}). There were 47 housing units at an average density of 427.3 per square mile (165.0/km^{2}). The racial makeup of the village was 100.0% White.

There were 34 households, of which 23.5% had children under the age of 18 living with them, 47.1% were married couples living together, 5.9% had a female householder with no husband present, 2.9% had a male householder with no wife present, and 44.1% were non-families. 32.4% of all households were made up of individuals, and 20.5% had someone living alone who was 65 years of age or older. The average household size was 2.03 and the average family size was 2.53.

The median age in the village was 49.1 years. 15.9% of residents were under the age of 18; 5.8% were between the ages of 18 and 24; 15.9% were from 25 to 44; 40.5% were from 45 to 64; and 21.7% were 65 years of age or older. The gender makeup of the village was 44.9% male and 55.1% female.

=== 2000 census ===
As of the census of 2000, there were 108 people, 40 households, and 27 families living in the village. The population density was 984.6 inhabitants per square mile (380.2/km^{2}). There were 46 housing units at an average density of 419.4 per square mile (161.9/km^{2}). The racial makeup of the village was 100.00% White. Hispanic or Latino of any race were 5.56% of the population.

There were 40 households, out of which 42.5% had children under the age of 18 living with them, 57.5% were married couples living together, 10.0% had a female householder with no husband present, and 32.5% were non-families. 27.5% of all households were made up of individuals, and 17.5% had someone living alone who was 65 years of age or older. The average home size was 2.70 and the average family size was 3.37.

In the village, the population was spread out, with 33.3% under the age of 18, 7.4% from 18 to 24, 30.6% from 25 to 44, 13.0% from 45 to 64, and 15.7% who were 65 years of age or older. The median age was 34 years. For every 100 females, there were 96.4 males. For every 100 females age 18 and over, there were 84.6 males.

As of 2000 the median income for a household in the village was $25,417, and the median income for a family was $23,750. Males had a median income of $30,000 versus $20,833 for females. The per capita income for the village was $12,470. There were 14.7% of families and 9.9% of the population living below the poverty line, including 8.9% of under eighteens and 13.0% of those over 64.
