= Linwood, Nebraska =

Village in Nebraska, US

- Village
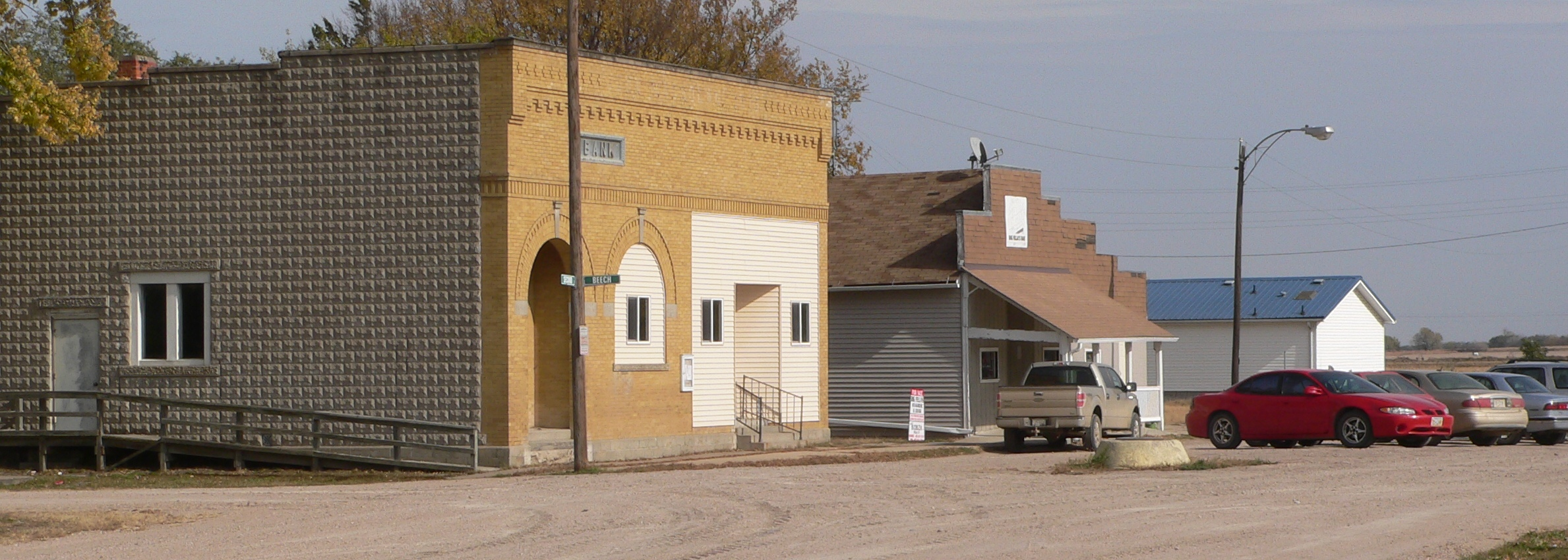
- Downtown Linwood

- Location of Linwood, Nebraska

- Location within Nebraska Location within the United States
- Coordinates: 41°24′44″N 96°55′56″W
- Country: United States
- State: Nebraska
- County: Butler
- Township: Platte

Area
  - Total: 0.38 sq mi (0.98 km^{2})
  - Land: 0.38 sq mi (0.98 km^{2})
  - Water: 0 sq mi (0.00 km^{2})
- Elevation: 1,335 ft (407 m)

Population (2020)
  - Total: 94
  - Density: 248.3/sq mi (95.87/km^{2})
- Time zone: UTC-6 (Central (CST))
  - Summer (DST): UTC-5 (CDT)
- ZIP code: 68036
- Area code: 402
- FIPS code: 31-28245
- GNIS feature ID: 2398447
- Website: villageoflinwood.com

Linwood is a village in Butler County, Nebraska, United States. As of the 2020 census, Linwood had a population of 94.

== History ==
An attempt to settle the area was first made in 1857, on the banks of Skull Creek, a half-mile from current-day Linwood. A school was established in 1865, and a postmaster for the settlement, originally named Skull Creek, was appointed in 1868. It was later renamed Linwood for the linden trees growing near the creek. Linwood was incorporated as a village in 1888, shortly after the Fremont, Elkhorn and Missouri Valley Railroad built a line through the settlement. Linwood served as a junction point for branch rail lines going to Superior and Hastings. Those rail lines were abandoned by the early 1960s, leaving Linwood without rail service. A 1963 flood devastated the community.

== Geography ==
According to the United States Census Bureau, the village has a total area of 0.37 square miles (0.96 km^{2}), all land.

== Demographics ==
Historical population
| Census | Pop. | Note | %± |
|---|---|---|---|
| 1890 | 309 | | — |
| 1900 | 317 | | 2.6% |
| 1910 | 329 | | 3.8% |
| 1920 | 297 | | −9.7% |
| 1930 | 235 | | −20.9% |
| 1940 | 247 | | 5.1% |
| 1950 | 168 | | −32.0% |
| 1960 | 151 | | −10.1% |
| 1970 | 108 | | −28.5% |
| 1980 | 119 | | 10.2% |
| 1990 | 91 | | −23.5% |
| 2000 | 118 | | 29.7% |
| 2010 | 88 | | −25.4% |
| 2020 | 94 | | 6.8% |
U.S. Decennial Census

=== 2010 census ===
As of the census of 2010, there were 88 people, 38 households, and 21 families residing in the village. The population density was 237.8 inhabitants per square mile (91.8/km^{2}). There were 50 housing units at an average density of 135.1 units per square mile (52.2 units/km^{2}). The racial makeup of the village was 94.3% White, 2.3% Native American, and 3.4% from two or more races. Hispanic or Latino of any race were 5.7% of the population.

There were 38 households, of which 31.6% had children under the age of 18 living with them, 34.2% were married couples living together, 13.2% had a female householder with no husband present, 7.9% had a male householder with no wife present, and 44.7% were non-families. 31.6% of all households were made up of individuals, and 10.5% had someone living alone who was 65 years of age or older. The average household size was 2.32 and the average family size was 3.00.

The median age in the village was 31.5 years. 29.5% of residents were under the age of 18; 10.3% were between the ages of 18 and 24; 21.6% were from 25 to 44; 26.1% were from 45 to 64; and 12.5% were 65 years of age or older. The gender makeup of the village was 55.7% male and 44.3% female.

=== 2000 census ===
As of the census of 2000, there were 118 people, 45 households, and 26 families residing in the village. The population density was 324.7 inhabitants per square mile (125.4/km^{2}). There were 50 housing units at an average density of 137.6 units per square mile (53.1 units/km^{2}). The racial makeup of the village was 99.15% White, 0.85% from other races. Hispanic or Latino of any race were 2.54% of the population.

There were 45 households, out of which 35.6% had children under the age of 18 living with them, 48.9% were married couples living together, 6.7% had a female householder with no husband present, and 42.2% were non-families. 31.1% of all households were made up of individuals, and 13.3% had someone living alone who was 65 years of age or older. The average household size was 2.62 and the average family size was 3.31.

In the village, the population was spread out, with 33.1% under the age of 18, 5.1% from 18 to 24, 30.5% from 25 to 44, 21.2% from 45 to 64, and 10.2% who were 65 years of age or older. The median age was 34 years. For every 100 females, there were 103.4 males. For every 100 females age 18 and over, there were 119.4 males.

As of 2000 the median income for a household in the village was $31,250, and the median income for a family was $40,833. Males had a median income of $31,528 versus $21,250 for females. The per capita income for the village was $13,654. There were 10.7% of families and 9.0% of the population living below the poverty line, including 14.3% of under eighteens and none of those over 64.
