= Platte Township, Butler County, Nebraska =

Platte Township
- Township
- Location in Butler County
- Coordinates: 41°25′07″N 096°56′57″W
- Country: United States
- State: Nebraska
- County: Butler

Area
  - Total: 17.35 sq mi (44.94 km^{2})
  - Land: 17.22 sq mi (44.61 km^{2})
  - Water: 0.13 sq mi (0.33 km^{2}) 0.73%
- Elevation: 1,325 ft (404 m)

Population (2020)
  - Total: 162
  - Density: 9.41/sq mi (3.63/km^{2})
- GNIS feature ID: 0838189

Platte Township is one of seventeen townships in Butler County, Nebraska, United States. The population was 162 at the 2020 census. A 2021 estimate placed the township's population at 164.

The Village of Linwood lies within the Township.

== See also ==
- County government in Nebraska
