= Savannah Township, Butler County, Nebraska =

Savannah Township
- Township
- Location in Butler County
- Coordinates: 41°20′44″N 097°11′50″W
- Country: United States
- State: Nebraska
- County: Butler

Area
  - Total: 29.75 sq mi (77.06 km^{2})
  - Land: 29.71 sq mi (76.96 km^{2})
  - Water: 0.039 sq mi (0.1 km^{2}) 0.13%
- Elevation: 1,434 ft (437 m)

Population (2020)
  - Total: 546
  - Density: 18.4/sq mi (7.09/km^{2})
- GNIS feature ID: 0838232

Savannah Township is one of seventeen townships in Butler County, Nebraska, United States. The population was 546 at the 2020 census. A 2021 estimate placed the township's population at 549.

The Village of Bellwood lies within the Township.

== See also ==
- County government in Nebraska
