= Claire Boroff =

American football coach (born c. 1937)

Biographical details
- Born: c. 1937 (age 88–89); Grand Island, Nebraska, U.S.
- Education: Nebraska State Teachers College (1959, 1963)

Playing career

Football
- 1955: Nebraska
- 1956–1958: Kearney State

Track and field
- 1955: Nebraska
- 1956–1958: Kearney State
- Positions: Running back, kicker (football)

Coaching career (HC unless noted)

Football
- 1959–1961: Bertrand HS (NE)
- 1962–1964: Gothenburg HS (NE)
- 1965–1966: Kearney HS (NE)
- 1967–1968: Lincoln Northeast HS (NE)
- 1969–1971: Kearney State (backfield)
- 1972–1999: Kearney State / Nebraska–Kearney

Head coaching record
- Overall: 169–106–5 (college); 61–29–3 (high school)
- Tournaments: 1–3 (NAIA D-I playoffs)

Accomplishments and honors

Championships
- 6 CSIC (1977–1980, 1982, 1984); 5 NCC (1972–1976)

Awards
- NAIA All-American (1958)

Claire Boroff (born c. 1937) is an American former college football coach. He was the head football coach for Bertrand High School from 1959 to 1961, Gothenburg High School from 1962 to 1964, Kearney High School from 1965 to 1966, Lincoln Northeast High School from 1967 to 1968, and the University of Nebraska at Kearney from 1972 to 1999. He played college football for Nebraska and Kearney State as a running back and kicker.

== Head coaching record ==
=== College ===
Year	Team	Overall	Conference	Standing	Bowl/playoffs	NAIA^{#}
Kearney State Antelopes (Nebraska College Conference) (1972–1973)
1972	Kearney State	8–2	3–0	1st		
1973	Kearney State	6–3	2–1	T–1st		
Kearney State Antelopes (Nebraska College Conference / Great Plains Athletic Conference) (1974–1975)
1974	Kearney State	7–2	3–0 / 0–0	1st / N/A (Note: Ineligible for conference standings)		
1975	Kearney State	6–3	3–0 / 0–0	1st / N/A		
Kearney State Antelopes (Nebraska College Conference / Central States Intercollegiate Conference) (1976)
1976	Kearney State	9–1	3–0 / 4–1	1st / T–2nd		7
Kearney State Antelopes (Central States Intercollegiate Conference) (1977–1989)
1977	Kearney State	8–2–1	7–0	1st	L NAIA Division I Semifinal	5
1978	Kearney State	8–0–1	7–0	1st		10
1979	Kearney State	8–2	6–1	T–1st	L NAIA Division I Quarterfinal	3
1980	Kearney State	9–2–1	6–0–1	1st	L NAIA Division I Semifinal	7
1981	Kearney State	5–4	4–3	4th		
1982	Kearney State	6–4	6–1	T–1st		
1983	Kearney State	5–5	4–3	T–3rd		
1984	Kearney State	6–4	6–1	1st		
1985	Kearney State	3–6	3–4	T–4th		
1986	Kearney State	5–4	5–2	T–2nd		
1987	Kearney State	4–5	4–3	T–3rd		
1988	Kearney State	6–5	4–3	4th		24
1989	Kearney State	3–6	1–2	3rd		
Kearney State Antelopes / Nebraska–Kearney Lopers (NCAA Division II independent) (1990–1993)
1990	Kearney State	6–5				
1991	Nebraska–Kearney	4–6–1				
1992	Nebraska–Kearney	7–3				
1993	Nebraska–Kearney	3–7				
Nebraska–Kearney Lopers (Rocky Mountain Athletic Conference) (1994–1999)
1994	Nebraska–Kearney	8–3	0–0	N/A		
1995	Nebraska–Kearney	6–3–1	0–0	N/A		
1996	Nebraska–Kearney	4–7	4–4	T–5th		
1997	Nebraska–Kearney	7–4	6–2	T–2nd		
1998	Nebraska–Kearney	5–5	5–3	4th		
1999	Nebraska–Kearney	7–3	6–2	3rd		
Kearney State / Nebraska–Kearney:		169–106–5				
Total:		169–106–5				
National championship Conference title Conference division title or championship game berth

=== High school ===
Year	Team	Overall	Conference	Standing	Bowl/playoffs
Betrand Vikings (Republican Valley League) (1959–1961)
1959	Betrand	8–2		1st	
1960	Betrand	7–2			
1961	Betrand	9–1		1st	
Betrand:		24–5			
Gothenburg Swedes (Southwest Conference) (1962–1964)
1962	Gothenburg	1–7–1			
1963	Gothenburg	7–1–1		1st	
1964	Gothenburg	9–0		1st	
Gothenburg:		17–8–2			
Kearney Bearcats (Big Ten Conference) (1965–1966)
1965	Kearney	6–3–1		1st	
1966	Kearney	8–1			
Kearney:		14–4–1			
Lincoln Northeast Rockets () (1967–1968)
1967	Lincoln Northeast	2–7			
1968	Lincoln Northeast	4–5			
Lincoln Northeast:		6–12			
Total:		61–29–3			
National championship Conference title Conference division title or championship game berth
