= Toplis =

Toplis is a surname. Notable people with the surname include:

- Chioma Toplis (born 1972), Nigerian actress
- Percy Toplis (1896–1920), British imposter

== See also ==
- David Topliss (1949–2008), English rugby league footballer
