= 1997 North Dakota State Bison football team =

American college football season

1997 North Dakota State Bison football

NCAA Division II First Round, L 28–39 at Northwest Missouri State
- Conference: North Central Conference

Ranking
- AFCA: No. 16
- Record: 9–3 (7–2 NCC)
- Head coach: Bob Babich (1st season)
- Offensive scheme: Multiple
- Defensive coordinator: Gus Bradley (1st season)
- Base defense: 4–3
- Home stadium: Fargodome

1997 North Central Conference football standings
	Conf.			Overall
Team	W		L	W		L
No. 11 Northern Colorado $^	8	–	1	13	–	2
North Dakota	7	–	2	8	–	2
No. 16 North Dakota State ^	7	–	2	9	–	3
Nebraska–Omaha	6	–	3	8	–	3
St. Cloud State	5	–	4	6	–	5
South Dakota	3	–	6	5	–	6
Augustana (SD)	3	–	6	5	–	6
Mankato State	3	–	6	4	–	7
South Dakota State	3	–	6	4	–	6
Morningside	0	–	9	0	–	11
$ – Conference champion; ^ – NCAA Division II playoff participant; Rankings from NCAA Division II Football Committee poll

The 1997 North Dakota State Bison football team was an American football team that represented North Dakota State University during the 1997 NCAA Division II football season as a member of the North Central Conference. In their first year under head coach Bob Babich, the team compiled a 9–3 record.

== Schedule ==
Date	Opponent	Rank	Site	Result	Source
August 28	No. 6 West Georgia*		Fargodome; Fargo, ND	W 31–14	
September 6	Texas A&M–Commerce*		Fargodome; Fargo, ND	W 51–0	
September 20	No. 10 Nebraska–Omaha		Fargodome; Fargo, ND	L 21–27	
September 27	Augustana (SD)		Fargodome; Fargo, ND	W 37–0	
October 4	at No. 17 Northern Colorado		Nottingham Field; Greeley, CO	W 28–24	
October 11	Morningside	No. 18	Fargodome; Fargo, ND	W 35–0	
October 18	at No. 10 North Dakota	No. 16	Memorial Stadium; Grand Forks, ND (Nickel Trophy)	W 31–10	
October 25	at South Dakota State	No. 9	Coughlin–Alumni Stadium; Brookings, SD (rivalry)	L 27–34	
November 1	St. Cloud State		Fargodome; Fargo, ND	W 31–0	
November 8	at Mankato State		Blakeslee Stadium; Mankato, MN	W 47–20	
November 15	at South Dakota		DakotaDome; Vermillion, SD	W 24–21 ^{OT}	
November 22	at No. 3 Northwest Missouri State*	No. 16	Bearcat Stadium; Maryville, MO (NCAA Division II First Round)	L 28–39	
*Non-conference game; Rankings from NCAA Division II Football Committee Poll released prior to the game
