= Elsmere Public School =

School district in Nebraska, United States

District information
- Grades: Kindergarten - Grade 8
- Closed: June 15, 2006

Students and staff
- Students: 1
- Teachers: 1

Elsmere Public School (ID#16-0101-000) was a school district in Nebraska. It included the community of Elsmere.

It was a K-8 school district.

== History ==
The school was renovated in 1960, and at the time it had one teacher.

In 2004 there were 51 people living in the boundary of the entire district, with four of them living in the community of Elsmere. The district employed one teacher and had a single student. The school received science class materials from Valentine High School and an online provider supplied instruction in the Spanish language. Patti Vannoy, a student at the University of Nebraska–Lincoln writing for the Lincoln Journal Star, stated that, referring to long distances, "Roads are a large part of why Elsmere Public School still exists,[...]"

The district was dissolved on June 15, 2006. Valentine Community Schools absorbed the former district.

== See also ==
- List of school districts in Nebraska
