= 1997 Texas A&M–Commerce Lions football team =

American college football season

1997 Texas A&M–Commerce Lions football
- Conference: Lone Star Conference
- Record: 3–8 (2–5 LSC)
- Head coach: Eddie Vowell (12th season)
- Home stadium: Memorial Stadium

1997 Lone Star Conference football standings
	Conf.			Overall
Team	W		L	W		L
Overall*
No. 4 Texas A&M–Kingsville $^	9	–	0	9	–	2
No. 6 Angelo State ^	8	–	1	10	–	2
Central Oklahoma	7	–	2	9	–	2
West Texas A&M	6	–	3	7	–	4
SW Oklahoma State	5	–	4	5	–	5
Abilene Christian	5	–	4	7	–	4
Northeastern State	4	–	4	4	–	7
SE Oklahoma State	3	–	5	3	–	7
Harding	3	–	5	5	–	5
Ouachita Baptist	3	–	5	4	–	6
Texas A&M–Commerce	3	–	6	3	–	8
Eastern New Mexico	3	–	6	5	–	6
Midwestern State	3	–	6	3	–	7
Tarleton State	3	–	6	4	–	7
East Central	0	–	8	0	–	10
North Division
Central Oklahoma x	5	–	1	9	–	2
SW Oklahoma State x	5	–	1	5	–	5
Northeastern State	4	–	2	4	–	7
Harding	3	–	3	5	–	5
Ouachita Baptist	3	–	3	4	–	6
SE Oklahoma State	1	–	5	3	–	7
East Central	0	–	6	0	–	10
South Division
No. 4 Texas A&M–Kingsville x$^	7	–	0	9	–	2
No. 6 Angelo State ^	6	–	1	10	–	2
Abilene Christian	4	–	3	7	–	4
West Texas A&M	4	–	3	7	–	4
Eastern New Mexico	2	–	5	5	–	6
Tarleton State	2	–	5	4	–	7
Texas A&M–Commerce	3	–	5	3	–	8
Midwestern State	1	–	6	3	–	7
$ – Conference champion; ^ – NCAA Division II playoff participant; * – The LSC counted separate overall and division standings.; Rankings from NCAA Division II Football Committee poll

The 1997 Texas A&M–Commerce Lions football team represented Texas A&M University-Commerce in the 1997 NCAA Division II football season. They were led by head coach Eddie Vowell, who was in his 12th season at A&M-Commerce. The Lions played their home games at Memorial Stadium and were members of the Lone Star Conference (LSC). The Lions finished 11th in the LSC. It was the second losing season in a decade for the Lion football program.

== Schedule ==
Date	Opponent	Site	Result	Source
September 6	at North Dakota State*	Fargodome; Fargo, ND	L 0–51	
September 13	vs. Abilene Christian*	Pennington Field; Bedford, TX	L 10–26	
September 18	Southeastern Oklahoma State*	Memorial Stadium; Commerce, TX	L 14–15	
September 27	at Southwestern Oklahoma State*	Milam Stadium; Weatherford, OK	W 7–17	
October 4	Midwestern State	Memorial Stadium; Commerce, TX	W 49–7	
October 11	at No. 7 Texas A&M–Kingsville	Javelina Stadium; Kingsville, TX (Chennault Cup)	L 6–34	
October 18	West Texas A&M	Memorial Stadium; Commerce, TX	W 21–14	
October 25	at Eastern New Mexico	Greyhound Stadium; Blackwater Draw, NM	L 9–10	
November 1	Abilene Christian	Memorial Stadium; Commerce, TX	L 9–19	
November 9	at No. 3 Angelo State	San Angelo Stadium; San Angelo, TX	L 21–40	
November 15	Tarleton State	Memorial Stadium; Commerce, TX	L 21–49	
*Non-conference game; Rankings from AFCA Poll released prior to the game

== Postseason awards ==
=== All-Americans ===
- Trent Dagen, Honorable Mention Tight End

=== LSC Superlatives ===
- Offensive Lineman of the Year: Trent Dagen

=== LSC First Team ===
- Will Schale, Punter

=== LSC Second Team ===
- Trent Dagen, Tight End
- Carl Mitchell, Linebacker
- Traco Rachel, Defensive Back

=== LSC Honorable Mention ===
- Shon Adams, Defensive Back
- Bret Bertrand, Defensive End
- Kelvin Bradley, Linebacker
- Casey Cowan, Receiver
- Donald Gross, Defensive Tackle
- Antonio Wilson, Linebacker
- Jessie Young, Defensive Tackle
