= Minden High School =

Minden High School may refer to:

- Minden High School (Minden, Louisiana)
- Minden High School (Minden, Nebraska)
