= Elsmere, Nebraska =

Unincorporated community in Nebraska, United States

- Unincorporated community
- Location within the state of Nebraska
- Coordinates: 42°9′55″N 100°11′7″W
- Country: United States
- State: Nebraska
- County: Cherry
- Elevation: 2,687 ft (819 m)
- Time zone: UTC-6 (Central (CST))
  - Summer (DST): UTC-5 (CDT)
- ZIP codes: 69135
- GNIS feature ID: 835299

Elsmere is an unincorporated community in southeastern Cherry County, Nebraska, United States. It lies along local roads southeast of the city of Valentine, the county seat of Cherry County. Its elevation is 2,687 feet (819 m).

== History ==
A post office was established at Elsmere in 1899, and remained in operation until it was discontinued in 1992. The community was likely named after the novel Robert Elsmere by Mrs. Humphry Ward.

== Education ==
Valentine Community Schools of Valentine absorbed the former Elsmere Public School in 2006.
