= Crookston, Nebraska =

- Village
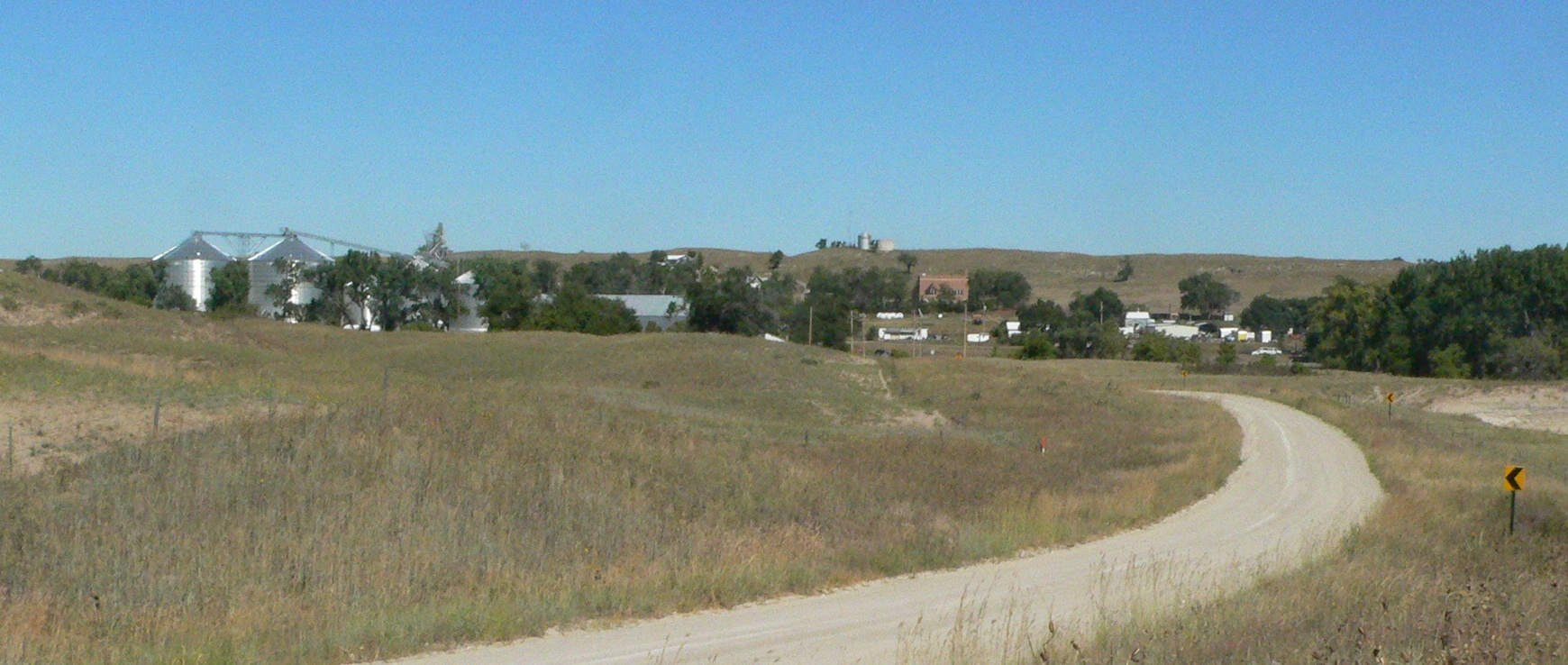
- Approaching Crookston from the south via county road

- Location of Crookston, Nebraska
- Coordinates: 42°55′35″N 100°44′54″W
- Country: United States
- State: Nebraska
- County: Cherry

Area
  - Total: 0.44 sq mi (1.13 km^{2})
  - Land: 0.44 sq mi (1.13 km^{2})
  - Water: 0 sq mi (0.00 km^{2})
- Elevation: 2,674 ft (815 m)

Population (2020)
  - Total: 71
  - Density: 163.3/sq mi (63.06/km^{2})
- Time zone: UTC-7 (Mountain (MST))
  - Summer (DST): UTC-6 (MDT)
- ZIP code: 69212
- Area code: 402
- FIPS code: 31-11475
- GNIS feature ID: 2398653

Crookston is a village in Cherry County, Nebraska, United States. The population was 71 at the 2020 census.

== History ==
Crookston got its start in the year 1885, following construction of the railroad through the territory. It was named for W. T. Crook, a railroad official.

A post office was established in Crookston in 1886, and remains in operation.

== Geography ==
According to the United States Census Bureau, the village has a total area of 0.44 square miles (1.14 km^{2}), all land.

== Demographics ==
Historical population
Census	Pop.	Note	%±
1930	373		—
1940	262		−29.8%
1950	168		−35.9%
1960	139		−17.3%
1970	86		−38.1%
1980	86		0.0%
1990	99		15.1%
2000	98		−1.0%
2010	69		−29.6%
2020	71		2.9%
U.S. Decennial Census

=== 2010 census ===
As of the census of 2010, there were 69 people, 35 households, and 17 families living in the village. The population density was 156.8 inhabitants per square mile (60.5/km^{2}). There were 51 housing units at an average density of 115.9 per square mile (44.7/km^{2}). The racial makeup of the village was 89.9% White, 2.9% Native American, 1.4% Pacific Islander, and 5.8% from two or more races.

There were 35 households, of which 25.7% had children under the age of 18 living with them, 40.0% were married couples living together, 5.7% had a female householder with no husband present, 2.9% had a male householder with no wife present, and 51.4% were non-families. 51.4% of all households were made up of individuals, and 14.3% had someone living alone who was 65 years of age or older. The average household size was 1.97 and the average family size was 2.88.

The median age in the village was 45.8 years. 24.6% of residents were under the age of 18; 7.1% were between the ages of 18 and 24; 15.9% were from 25 to 44; 39% were from 45 to 64; and 13% were 65 years of age or older. The gender makeup of the village was 55.1% male and 44.9% female.

=== 2000 census ===
As of the census of 2000, there were 98 people, 40 households, and 23 families living in the village. The population density was 229.9 inhabitants per square mile (88.8/km^{2}). There were 48 housing units at an average density of 112.6 per square mile (43.5/km^{2}). The racial makeup of the village was 95.92% White, and 4.08% from two or more races.

There were 40 households, out of which 27.5% had children under the age of 18 living with them, 40.0% were married couples living together, 7.5% had a female householder with no husband present, and 42.5% were non-families. 27.5% of all households were made up of individuals, and 5.0% had someone living alone who was 65 years of age or older. The average household size was 2.45 and the average family size was 3.13.

In the village, the population was spread out, with 25.5% under the age of 18, 7.1% from 18 to 24, 31.6% from 25 to 44, 28.6% from 45 to 64, and 7.1% who were 65 years of age or older. The median age was 37 years. For every 100 females, there were 117.8 males. For every 100 females age 18 and over, there were 102.8 males.

As of 2000 the median income for a household in the village was $27,000, and the median income for a family was $25,833. Males had a median income of $25,000 versus $16,094 for females. The per capita income for the village was $13,945. There were 30.0% of families and 44.8% of the population living below the poverty line, including 64.3% of under eighteens and 100.0% of those over 64.

== Education ==
Crookston is in Valentine Community Schools. Valentine High School is the sole comprehensive high school of the school district.

In 2006 Crookston Public School school district merged into Valentine Community Schools.
