= Chioma Toplis =

Nigerian actress (born 1972)

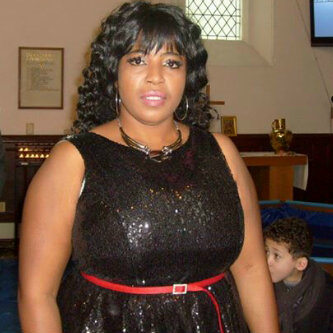
- Toplis at a children's school, August 2012
- Born: Chioma Elizabeth Toplis; 14 November 1972 (age 53); Umuahia, Nigeria
- Other names: Elizabeth
- Education: Valentine High School Barking and Dagenham College
- Occupation: Actress
- Years active: 2004–present
- Spouse: Andrew Toplis
- Children: 3

Chioma Elizabeth Toplis // (Born 14 November 1972) is a Nigerian born actress in Nigeria's movie industry (popularly called Nollywood). She made her career debut in 2004 in the movie Stolen Bible alongside Kate Henshaw but gained prominence when she appeared in a lead role in a 2005 movie Trinity with several other prominent Nigerian actors She was remanded in prison due to a post she made.

== Early life ==
Toplis, whose English name is Elizabeth, is a native of Umuahia, the capital city of Abia State, in the South-eastern part of Nigeria. She is related to another Nollywood actor and past President of the Actors Guild of Nigeria, Ejike Asiegbu.

== Education ==
Between 1979 and 1985, she did her primary school education at several schools: St Michaels Primary School Umuahia, Orji Town Primary School Owerri, Umuhu Central School, Umuahia and 67 Infantry Battalion Primary School Faulks Road, Aba. Between 1985 and 1990 she schooled at Ohuhu Community Secondary School Amaogwugwu, Umuahia. When she left Nigeria and lived for several years in London, she started at Valentine High School to study English Language and later enrolled at Barking and Dagenham College in 2003 to study Social Healthcare.

== Personal life ==
Chioma Toplis is married and has three children. She has homes in London, England and on Victoria Island, a high-brow part of Lagos State, a state located in the southwestern part of Nigeria. She has an interest in charity and is involved in the project Home For The Elderly.

== Career ==
Toplis began her acting career when she first appeared in the successful 2004 movie Stolen Bible. Her appearance in the 2005 film Trinity with Hanks Anuku, Val Nwigwe, and top actress Oge Okoye, received positive reviews and is seen as Toplis break-in performance into the big-time in Nollywood.

Chioma Toplis is also a businesswoman with an interest in clothes and cosmetics and owns a couple of shops in Lagos and London

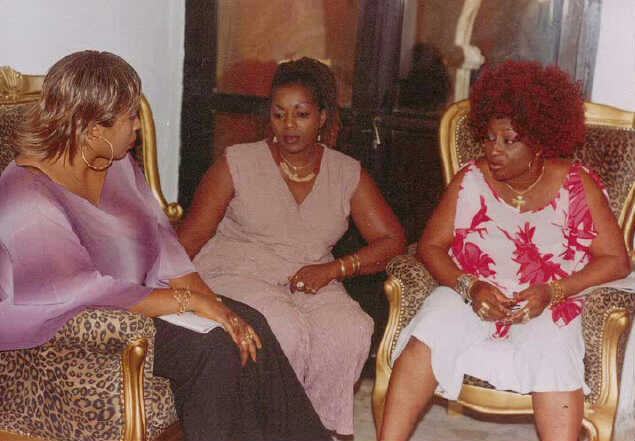
Chioma Toplis, Rita Edochie and Patience Ozokwor on set of Abuja Top Ladies, 2006.

== Filmography ==
| Year | Title | Role |
|---|---|---|
| 2004 | The Stolen bible | |
| 2005 | The Carcass | |
| 2005 | Trinity | |
| 2005 | Abuja Top Ladies | |
| 2006 | Last dance | Joy |
| 2008 | Plane crash | Udumma |
| 2009 | Sincerity | Juliet |
| 2015 | Saving Grace | manager |
| 2015 | The Lowcut | |
| 2018 | Just One Blood | |
| 2018 | Broken Soul | |
| 2021 | All I Ever Wanted | |
