= Northern Colorado Bears football =

Intercollegiate American football team

Northern Colorado Bears
2026 Northern Colorado Bears football team
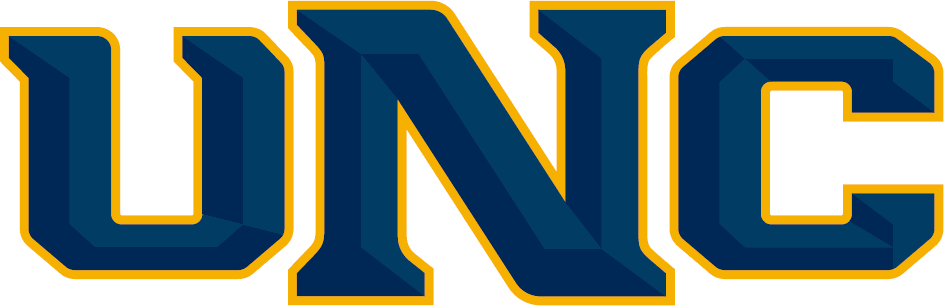
- First season: 1893; 133 years ago
- Head coach: Ed Lamb; 4th season, 5–30 (.143)
- Location: Greeley, Colorado
- Stadium: Nottingham Field (capacity: 8,533)
- NCAA division: Division I FCS
- Conference: Big Sky
- Colors: Blue and gold
- All-time record: 456–537–23 (.460)

NCAA Division II championships
- 1996, 1997

Conference championships
- RMAC: 1934, 1948, 1969, 1971 GPAC: 1973, 1974, 1975 NCC: 1980, 1997, 1998, 1999, 2002

Division championships
- RMAC Plains: 1969, 1970, 1971
- Rivalries: Portland State
- Mascot: Klawz the Bear
- Website: uncbears.com

The Northern Colorado Bears football program is the intercollegiate American football team for the University of Northern Colorado located in Greeley, Colorado. The team competes in the Big Sky Conference at the NCAA Division I Football Championship Subdivision (FCS) level. The university's first football team was fielded in 1893. They joined Division I in 2004. The team plays home games at the 8,533 seat Nottingham Field on campus. The Bears announced the hiring of Ed Lamb on December 6, 2022, replacing Ed McCaffrey, who went 6–16 in two seasons.

== Conference affiliations ==
Below is the list of conferences in which Northern Colorado has been a member.

- Rocky Mountain Athletic Conference (1923–1971)
- Great Plains Athletic Conference (1972–1975)
- NCAA Division II independent (1976–1979)
- North Central Conference (1980–2002)
- Great West Football Conference (2004–2005)
- Big Sky Conference (2006–present)

== Championships ==
=== National championships ===
Northern Colorado made two appearances in the NCAA Division II National Championship Game. The Bears defeated Carson–Newman, 23–14 in 1996, and later defeated New Haven, 51–0 in 1997.

Year	NCAA Division	Coach	Record	National Championship Game	Opponent	Result	Location
1996	II	Joe Glenn	12–3	1996 Division II National Championship	Carson–Newman	W 23–14	Florence, AL
1997	II	Joe Glenn	13–2	1997 Division II National Championship	New Haven	W 51–0	Florence, AL

=== Conference championships ===
Year	Coach	Conference	Overall record	Conference record
1934†	John W. Hancock	Rocky Mountain Athletic Conference	6–1	6–1
1948	John W. Hancock	Rocky Mountain Athletic Conference	4–4	3–0
1969	Bob Blasi	Rocky Mountain Athletic Conference	10–0	5–0
1971	Bob Blasi	Rocky Mountain Athletic Conference	8–1–1	5–0
1973†	Bob Blasi	Great Plains Athletic Conference	7–2	4–1
1974	Bob Blasi	Great Plains Athletic Conference	8–1	5–0
1975	Bob Blasi	Great Plains Athletic Conference	8–1	5–0
1980	Bob Blasi	North Central Conference	7–4	6–1
1997†	Joe Glenn	North Central Conference	13–2	8–1
1998†	Joe Glenn	North Central Conference	11–2	8–1
1999†	Joe Glenn	North Central Conference	11–2	8–1
2002	Kay Dalton	North Central Conference	12–2	8–0
Conference Championships			12	

† Co-champions

=== Division championships ===
Year	Coach	Division championship	Opponent	CG result
1969	Bob Blasi	RMAC Plains	Adams State	W 33–14
1970†	Bob Blasi	RMAC Plains	N/A lost tiebreaker to Pittsburg State	
1971	Bob Blasi	RMAC Plains	Western State	W 25–15
Division Championships			3	

== Playoff appearances ==
=== NCAA Division II ===
The Bears appeared in the Division II playoffs nine times with an overall record of 12–7.

Year	Round	Opponent	Result
1980	First Round	Eastern Illinois	L 14–21
1990	First Round	North Dakota State	L 7–17
1991	First Round	Portland State	L 24–28
1995	First Round	Pittsburg State	L 17–36
1996	First Round; Quarterfinals; Semifinals; Finals	Pittsburg State; NW Missouri State; Clarion; Carson-Newman	W 24–21; W 27–26; W 19–18; W 23–14
1997	First Round; Quarterfinals; Semifinals; Finals	Pittsburg State; NW Missouri State; Carson-Newman; New Haven	W 24–16; W 35–19; W 30–29; W 51–0
1998	First Round; Quarterfinals	North Dakota; NW Missouri State	W 52–28; L 17–42
1999	First Round; Quarterfinals	Pittsburg State; NW Missouri State	W 34–31; L 35–41
2002	First Round; Quarterfinals; Semifinals	Central Missouri State; NW Missouri State; Grand Valley	W 49–28; W 23–12; L 7–44

== Attendance ==
=== Highest attendance ===
Below is a list of the Bears best-attended home games at Nottingham Field.

Rk.	Date	Opponent	Attendance
Highest attendance
1	October 1, 2005	Cal Poly	9,145
2	October 29, 2005	Fort Lewis	8,561
3	October 2, 2010	Montana	8,105
4	September 3, 2005	Colorado School of Mines	7,554
5	October 23, 1998	South Dakota	7,520
6	October 9, 1999	Nebraska-Omaha	7,499
7	November 21, 1998	North Dakota	7,312
8	September 20, 1998	Texas State	7,246
9	October 19, 2002	South Dakota	7,198
10	October 10, 1998	South Dakota	7,135

As of the 2014 season.

=== Yearly attendance ===
Below is the Bears home attendance by season at Nottingham Field.

Season	Total	Average	High
Northern Colorado Bears
2018	25,293	4,215	5,672
2017	21,917	4,383	5,378
2016	24,477	4,895	5,476
2015	25,612	4,269	5,205
2014	21,037	4,207	6,348
2013	23,990	3,998	4,619
2012	21,240	4,248	5,136
2011	23,428	3,905	5,692
2010	27,919	5,584	8,105
2009	21,111	3,518	5,247
2008	21,676	4,355	7,246
2007	20,441	4,088	6,684
2006	28,857	6,219	4,810
2005	37,549	7,510	9,142
2004	27,370	4,562	6,481
2003	28,730	5,746	6,660
2002	34,898	5,816	7,198
2001	26,153	4,359	5,488
2000	29,162	6,352	4,860
1999	46,552	6,650	7,520
1998	40,690	5,813	7,312
1997	25,302	4,217	6,345
1996	27,282	4,547	6,318
1995	25,067	4,364	7,024

As of the 2015 season.

== Retired Numbers ==
Northern Colorado Retired numbers

Northern Colorado has retired the following jersey numbers for their football program:

Number	Name	Position	Tenure	Jersey Retirement Date
12	Corte McGuffey	QB	1995-99	11/10/2007
81	Vincent Jackson	WR	2001-05	10/9/2021
91	Aaron Smith	DE	1995-98	10/18/2026

== Notable former players ==
Notable alumni include:

- Reed Doughty
- Vincent Jackson
- Dirk Johnson
- Jeff Knapple
- Bill Kenney
- Corte McGuffey
- Brad Pyatt
- Tony Ramirez
- Aaron Smith
- Loren Snyder
- Dave Stalls
- Frank Wainright
- Jed Roberts
- Herve Tonye-Tonye
- Cedric Tillman
- Brian Scott
- Kyle Sloter

== Head coaching records in FCS ==
Since moving to the Big Sky Conference in the Football Championship Subdivision (FCS) in 2006, the Bears have struggled. Their FCS record since 2006 is 39–146 as of the 2025 season.

FCS head coaching records

- Scott Downing: 9–47
- Earnest Collins Jr.: 19–53
- Ed McCaffrey: 6–16
- Ed Lamb: 5–30 as of the end of the 2025 season

Team FCS record as of the end of 2025: 39–146 (.211)

== Future non-conference opponents ==
Announced schedules as of October 27, 2026.

2027	2028	2029	2030	2031	2032	2033	2035
at New Mexico	at Colorado	at Colorado State	at Wyoming	at Colorado	at Colorado State	at Colorado State	at Colorado State
Rocky Mountain							
Houston Christian							
