= 1997 UC Davis Aggies football team =

American college football season

1997 UC Davis Aggies football

NCAA Division II Semifinal, L 25–27 at New Haven
- Conference: Independent
- Record: 9–5
- Head coach: Bob Biggs (5th season)
- Offensive coordinator: Mike Moroski (5th season)
- Home stadium: Toomey Field

1997 NCAA Division II independents football records
	Conf.			Overall
Team	W		L	W		L
No. 2 New Haven ^		–		12	–	2
Mercyhurst		–		6	–	3
No. 14 UC Davis ^		–		9	–	5
Elon		–		7	–	4
Kentucky Wesleyan		–		6	–	4
Western New Mexico		–		5	–	5
Saint Joseph's (IN)		–		5	–	6
Gannon		–		4	–	6
Oklahoma Panhandle State		–		3	–	7
Wayne State (NE)		–		3	–	7
Humboldt State		–	*	2	–	8
Quincy		–		0	–	10
^ – NCAA Division II playoff participant; * – Went 1-4 in conference play as part of NAIA Columbia Football Association; Rankings from NCAA Division II Football Committee poll

The 1997 UC Davis football team represented the University of California, Davis as an independent during the 1997 NCAA Division II football season. Led by fifth-year head coach Bob Biggs, UC Davis compiled an overall record of 9–5. 1997 was the 28th consecutive winning season for the Aggies. UC Davis was ranked No. 14 in the NCAA Division II poll at the end of the regular season and advanced to the NCAA Division II Football Championship playoffs. They upset fourth-ranked Texas A&M–Kingsville in Kingsville, Texas in the first round for the second straight season. In the quarterfinals, the Aggies upset sixth-ranked Angelo State in San Angelo, Texas before falling in the semifinals to second-ranked New Haven in West Haven, Connecticut. The team outscored its opponents 378 to 325 for the season. The Aggies played home games at Toomey Field in Davis, California.

== Schedule ==
Date	Opponent	Rank	Site	Result	Attendance	Source
September 6	Cal Poly	No. 7	Toomey Field; Davis, CA (rivalry)	L 19–20		
September 13	South Dakota State	No. 15	Toomey Field; Davis, CA	L 7–17		
September 20	at Sacramento State		Hornet Stadium; Sacramento, CA (Causeway Classic)	W 36–28 ^{3OT}	15,650	
September 27	at Clarion		Memorial Stadium; Clarion, PA	W 35–28 ^{OT}		
October 4	Central Washington		Toomey Field; Davis, CA	W 32–6		
October 11	at Idaho	No. 19	Kibbie Dome; Moscow, ID	L 14–44	14,137	
October 18	Western Washington		Toomey Field; Davis, CA	W 16–7		
October 25	at Saint Mary's	No. 16	Saint Mary's Stadium; Moraga, CA	W 19–9		
November 1	at Southern Utah	No. 16	Eccles Coliseum; Cedar City, UT	L 27–37		
November 8	No. 15 Grand Valley State	No. 20	Toomey Field; Davis, CA	W 21–19		
November 15	Western Oregon	No. 15	Toomey Field; Davis, CA	W 40–16		
November 22	at No. 4 Texas A&M–Kingsville	No. 14	Javelina Stadium; Kingsville, TX (NCAA Division II First Round)	W 37–34		
November 29	at No. 6 Angelo State	No. 14	Multi-Sports Complex; San Angelo, TX (NCAA Division II Quarterfinal)	W 50–33		
December 6	at No. 2 New Haven	No. 14	Robert B. Dodds Stadium; West Haven, CT (NCAA Division II Semifinal)	L 25–27		
Rankings from NCAA Division II Football Committee Poll released prior to the game
