= Wood Lake, Nebraska =

- Village
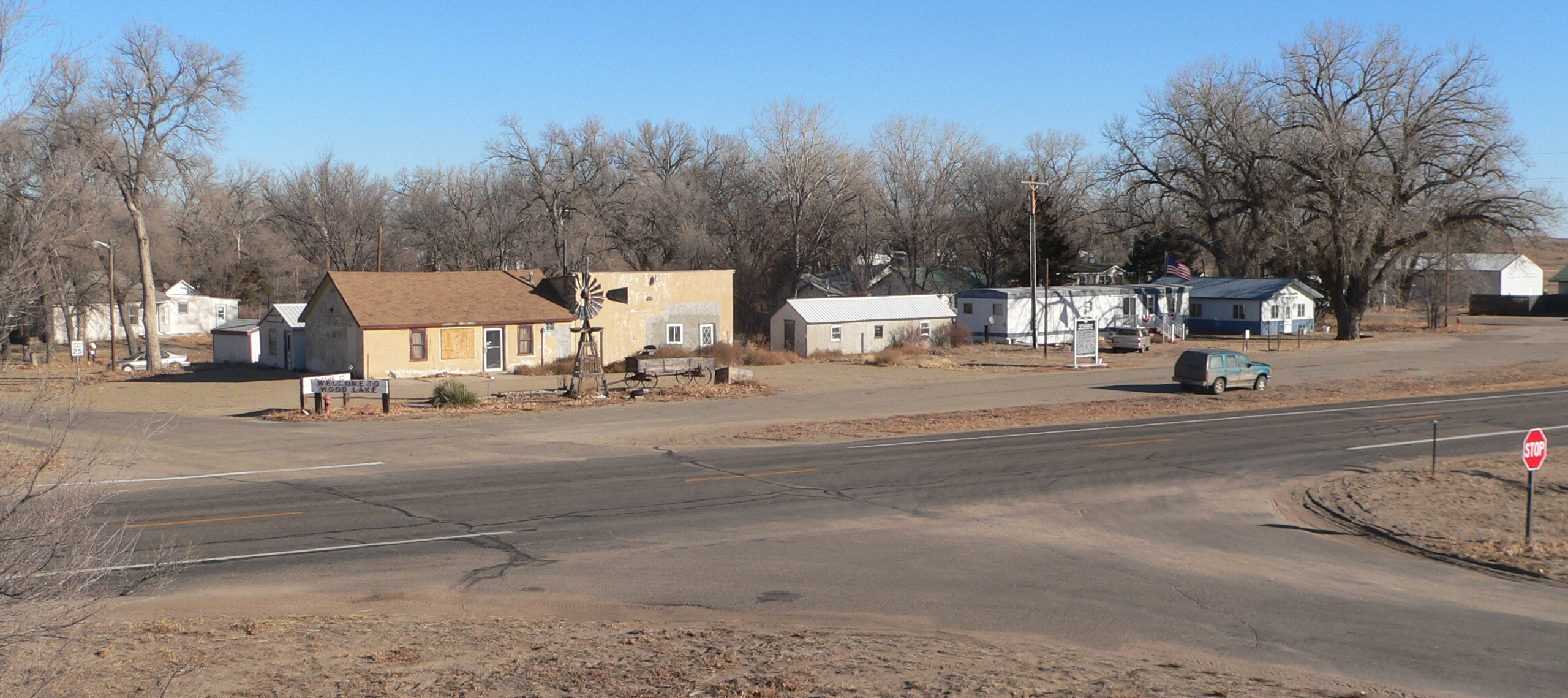
- Businesses beside U.S. Highway 20 in Wood Lake

- Location of Wood Lake, Nebraska
- Coordinates: 42°38′19″N 100°14′15″W
- Country: United States
- State: Nebraska
- County: Cherry

Area
  - Total: 0.33 sq mi (0.85 km^{2})
  - Land: 0.32 sq mi (0.82 km^{2})
  - Water: 0.012 sq mi (0.03 km^{2})
- Elevation: 2,690 ft (820 m)

Population (2020)
  - Total: 46
  - Density: 150/sq mi (56/km^{2})
- Time zone: UTC-6 (Central (CST))
  - Summer (DST): UTC-5 (CDT)
- ZIP code: 69221
- Area code: 402
- FIPS code: 31-53555
- GNIS feature ID: 2399730

Wood Lake is a village in Cherry County, Nebraska, United States. The population was 46 at the 2020 census.

== History ==
Wood Lake was founded in 1882 when the Fremont, Elkhorn and Missouri Valley Railroad was extended to that point. It was named for the trees at a nearby lake, which were the source of valuable timber.

== Geography ==
According to the United States Census Bureau, the village has a total area of 0.33 square miles (0.85 km^{2}), of which 0.32 square miles (0.83 km^{2}) is land and 0.01 square miles (0.03 km^{2}) is water.

== Demographics ==
Historical population
Census	Pop.	Note	%±
1910	198		—
1920	323		63.1%
1930	293		−9.3%
1940	323		10.2%
1950	238		−26.3%
1960	197		−17.2%
1970	117		−40.6%
1980	89		−23.9%
1990	59		−33.7%
2000	72		22.0%
2010	63		−12.5%
2020	46		−27.0%
U.S. Decennial Census

=== 2010 census ===
As of the census of 2010, there were 63 people, 33 households, and 16 families living in the village. The population density was 196.9 inhabitants per square mile (76.0/km^{2}). There were 48 housing units at an average density of 150.0 per square mile (57.9/km^{2}). The racial makeup of the village was 98.4% White and 1.6% Native American.

There were 33 households, of which 18.2% had children under the age of 18 living with them, 42.4% were married couples living together, 6.1% had a female householder with no husband present, and 51.5% were non-families. 48.5% of all households were made up of individuals, and 30.4% had someone living alone who was 65 years of age or older. The average household size was 1.91 and the average family size was 2.81.

The median age in the village was 43.8 years. 19% of residents were under the age of 18; 11.1% were between the ages of 18 and 24; 20.5% were from 25 to 44; 11.2% were from 45 to 64; and 38.1% were 65 years of age or older. The gender makeup of the village was 52.4% male and 47.6% female.

=== 2000 census ===
As of the census of 2000, there were 72 people, 36 households, and 24 families living in the village. The population density was 224.0 inhabitants per square mile (86.5/km^{2}). There were 48 housing units at an average density of 149.3 per square mile (57.6/km^{2}). The racial makeup of the village was 95.83% White, 1.39% Native American, and 2.78% from two or more races.

There were 36 households, out of which 25.0% had children under the age of 18 living with them, 61.1% were married couples living together, 8.3% had a female householder with no husband present, and 30.6% were non-families. 30.6% of all households were made up of individuals, and 25.0% had someone living alone who was 65 years of age or older. The average household size was 2.00 and the average family size was 2.40.

In the village, the population was spread out, with 19.4% under the age of 18, 1.4% from 18 to 24, 16.7% from 25 to 44, 27.8% from 45 to 64, and 34.7% who were 65 years of age or older. The median age was 59 years. For every 100 females, there were 89.5 males. For every 100 females age 18 and over, there were 87.1 males.

As of 2000 the median income for a household in the village was $24,375, and the median income for a family was $28,333. Males had a median income of $22,083 versus $38,750 for females. The per capita income for the village was $15,063. There were 46.4% of families and 44.7% of the population living below the poverty line, including 60.0% of under eighteens and 36.0% of those over 64.

== Education ==
Wood Lake is in Valentine Community Schools. Valentine High School is the sole comprehensive high school of the school district.

In 2006 Wood Lake Public School school district merged into Valentine Community Schools.
