= Ogallala High School =

Location
- 602 E G Street; Ogallala, Nebraska 69153; United States; 41.1315°N 101.7110°W

Information
- Type: Public school
- Principal: John O'Neil
- Faculty: 25.37 (FTE)
- Grades: 9th - 12th
- Enrollment: 237 (2024-25)
- Student to teacher ratio: 10.63
- Colors: Orange and black
- Athletics conference: Southwest Conference
- Mascot: Indians
- Website: www.opsd.org

Ogallala High School is a secondary school located in Ogallala, Nebraska, United States.

== About ==
Ogallala High School is part of the Ogallala Public School District and is the only high school in Ogallala. The school takes in students from Prairie View School, which is open to students in grades PreK-8. The current building was opened in fall 1963 for grades 10-12. Following an addition to the school in 1983, Ogallala High School was expanded to grades 9-12.

== Athletics ==
Ogallala High School competes in the Southwest Conference.

The Ogallala High School alma mater is:

Ogallala, Ogallala fight, fight, fight, fight
Take the ball right down the field boys
Fight with all your might. Go, fight, win!

Ogallala, Ogallala, you are always true
So fight, fight for Ogallala here’s to you!

== Notable alumni ==
- Ed Husmann, former National Football League player
