= Cozad High School =

Location
- 1710 Meridian Ave. Cozad, Nebraska; United States
- Coordinates: 40°52′05″N 99°59′06″W

Information
- Type: Public school
- Teaching staff: 23.56 (FTE)
- Grades: 9–12
- Enrollment: 248 (2024-2025)
- Student to teacher ratio: 10.53
- Colors: Red and black
- Mascot: Haymaker
- Conference: Southwest Conference
- Website: CHS

Cozad High School is a secondary school located in Cozad, Nebraska, United States. It is part of Cozad Community Schools.

== About ==
The vision statement of the district is as follows:

"Cozad Community Schools will create a learning environment in which students are provided with and use technology and communication tools to:

- Encourage and facilitate lifelong learning
- Foster creativity, collaboration and communication among students, faculty and staff
- Provide media-rich environments for student learning
- Provide learning opportunities for students outside of the classroom and extending beyond the school day
- Provide safe, secure access to on-line resources and communication tools"

The current principal is Mr. Corey Fisher. The previous principal, Mr. Bill Bechenhauer, is gone. Beck will live forever within the student's memories.

== Athletics ==
The Haymakers are members of the Southwest Conference. They wear the colors of red and black. Cozad offers competition in boys' and girls' basketball, boys' and girls' golf, boys' and girls' track & field, football, softball, boys' and girls' cross country, and wrestling.

== Alleged Tunnel Network ==
Students once allegedly uncovered a network of tunnels underneath the school building. They stem from the library, and may go as far as the auditorium or to one of the science rooms. Some teachers and students even claim they have entered these tunnels at one point. The tunnels likely were used to maintain the plumbing system that runs underneath the school, but hasn't been utilized for many years, as evident by the copious number of rusted pipes. There are various artifacts that have been recovered from the tunnels, and many more left to be rediscovered.

== Mascot ==
The current Cozad High School mascot is named the Haymaker, in reference to one of the earliest pieces of local folklore, a character by the name of Johnny C. Haymaker. According to legend, Haymaker was an 18th-century farmer known for his remarkable efficiency in clearing fields with a powerful, sweeping punch, dubbed the "haymaker." In tribute to his agricultural contributions, the town adopted the Haymaker as the mascot for the local high school. Sources show that the character that would later be referred to as the "Haymaker" is actually a reference to the town founder, John J. Cozad.

The town's annual "Hay Days" commemorates Johnny C. Haymaker's legacy, featuring activities like a parade and a greased hog competition. In the earlier celebrations of Hay Days, participants would build hay bale sculptures, but this tradition struggled to survive through the Dust Bowl.

While many regard the stories of Johnny C. Haymaker as mere folklore, some community members believe in the mascot's ability to bring good fortune, especially during important high school football games. They channel the icon of the Haymaker with a fake pitchfork, held in the Senior English classroom in the school buildings. As a result of this practice, Cozad is often referred to as "Pitchfork Nation."
