= 1997 Northern Colorado Bears football team =

American college football season

1997 Northern Colorado Bears football

NCAA Division II champion NCC champion

NCAA Division II Championship Game, W 51–0 vs. New Haven
- Conference: North Central Conference
- Record: 13–2 (8–1 NCC)
- Head coach: Joe Glenn (9th season)
- Home stadium: Nottingham Field

1997 North Central Conference football standings
	Conf.			Overall
Team	W		L	W		L
No. 11 Northern Colorado $^	8	–	1	13	–	2
North Dakota	7	–	2	8	–	2
No. 16 North Dakota State ^	7	–	2	9	–	3
Nebraska–Omaha	6	–	3	8	–	3
St. Cloud State	5	–	4	6	–	5
South Dakota	3	–	6	5	–	6
Augustana (SD)	3	–	6	5	–	6
Mankato State	3	–	6	4	–	7
South Dakota State	3	–	6	4	–	6
Morningside	0	–	9	0	–	11
$ – Conference champion; ^ – NCAA Division II playoff participant; Rankings from NCAA Division II Football Committee poll

The 1997 Northern Colorado Bears football team was an American football team that won the 1997 NCAA Division II national championship.

The team represented the University of Northern Colorado in the North Central Conference (NCC) during the 1997 NCAA Division II football season. In their ninth season under head coach Joe Glenn, the Bears compiled a 13–2 record (8–1 against conference opponents), outscored opponents by a total of 489 to 249, and won the NCC championship. The team advanced to the playoffs and won the national championship by defeating New Haven in the championship game.

The team played its home games at Nottingham Field in Greeley, Colorado.

== Schedule ==
Date	Opponent	Rank	Site	Result	Attendance	Source
September 6	Mesa State*	No. 1	Nottingham Field; Greeley, CO	W 28–7		
September 13	at Western State (CO)*	No. 1	Gunnison, CO	L 13–14		
September 20	at Augustana (SD)	No. 15	Sioux Falls, SD	W 49–40		
September 27	St. Cloud State	No. 18	Nottingham Field; Greeley, CO	W 30–27		
October 4	North Dakota State	No. 17	Nottingham Field; Greeley, CO	L 24–28		
October 11	at South Dakota		Vermillion, SD	W 45–31		
October 18	Mankato State		Nottingham Field; Greeley, CO	W 31–0		
October 25	No. 13 Nebraska–Omaha		Nottingham Field; Greeley, CO	W 37–17		
November 1	at Morningside	No. 19	Sioux City, IA	W 41–7		
November 8	at South Dakota State	No. 13	Brookings, SD	W 17–7		
November 15	No. 7 North Dakota	No. 12	Nottingham Field; Greeley, CO	W 34–7		
November 22	at No. 8 Pittsburg State*	No. 11	Carnie Smith Stadium; Pittsburg, KS (NCAA Division II first round)	W 24–16		
November 29	at No. 3 Northwest Missouri State*	No. 11	Bearcat Stadium; Maryville, MO (NCAA Division II quarterfinal)	W 35–19		
December 6	at No. 1 Carson–Newman*	No. 11	Jefferson City, TN (NCAA Division II semifinal)	W 30–29		
December 13	vs. No. 2 New Haven*	No. 11	Braly Municipal Stadium; Florence, AL (NCAA Division II Championship Game)	W 51–0	3,352	
*Non-conference game; Rankings from NCAA Division II Football Committee Poll released prior to the game
