= Ed Husmann =

American gridiron football player (1931–2018)

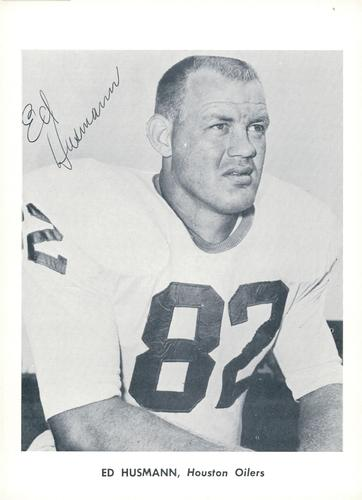
- Husmann c. 1961

No. 66, 65, 82
- Position: Defensive tackle

Personal information
- Born: August 6, 1931; Schuyler, Nebraska, U.S.
- Died: August 30, 2018 (aged 87); Austin, Texas, U.S.
- Listed height: 6 ft 2 in (1.88 m)
- Listed weight: 245 lb (111 kg)

Career information
- High school: Ogallala (Ogallala, Nebraska)
- College: Nebraska (1950–1952)
- NFL draft: 1953: 9th round, 99th overall pick

Career history
- Chicago Cardinals (1953–1959); Dallas Cowboys (1960); Houston Oilers (1961–1965); Edmonton Eskimos (1966)

Awards and highlights
- AFL champion (1961); First-team All-AFL (1962); 2× Second-team All-AFL (1961, 1963); 3× AFL All-Star (1961, 1962, 1963); 2× AFL sacks leader (1961, (Note: co-leader this season) 1962); Second-team All-Big Seven (1952)

Career NFL/AFL statistics
- Sacks: 33
- Fumble recoveries: 2
- Stats at Pro Football Reference

Edward Earl Husmann (August 6, 1931 - August 30, 2018) was an American football defensive tackle who played in the American Football League (AFL) for the Houston Oilers. He also played in the National Football League (NFL) for the Chicago Cardinals and the Dallas Cowboys. He played college football for the Nebraska Cornhuskers.

== Early life ==
Husmann attended Ogallala High School, earning All-state and All-conference honors as a senior in football. He also played basketball, ran track and wrestled.

He walked-on to the University of Nebraska. He became a starter as a senior, at right tackle on both sides of the ball. He was also a member of the wrestling team, and won the MVIAA heavyweight wrestling championship as a senior.

In 2004, he was inducted into the Nebraska Football Hall of Fame. In 2006, he was inducted into the Nebraska High School Hall of Fame.

== Professional career ==
=== Chicago Cardinals ===
Husmann was selected by the Chicago Cardinals in the ninth round (99th overall) of the 1953 NFL draft and began his career on the offensive line. He spent the next two years out of football, while serving his military service in the United States Army. He returned to the team in 1956.

=== Dallas Cowboys ===
He was selected by the Dallas Cowboys in the 1960 NFL expansion draft. He became the first starter at right defensive tackle in franchise history. He was waived on September 5, 1961.

=== Houston Oilers ===
In 1961, he was signed as a free agent by the Houston Oilers and was used at defensive tackle and defensive end. That year, he played a key role in the team winning their second straight championship and was the runner-up to Billy Cannon in the MVP voting for the title game.

He was released on August 8, 1966. He left with the franchise single-game sack record (4). During his professional career, he played every line position, offensive and defensive, except for center.

=== Edmonton Eskimos (CFL) ===
In 1966, he signed with the Edmonton Eskimos of the Canadian Football League.

== Personal life ==
Husmann died on August 30, 2018, in Austin, Texas at the age of 87. Husmann married Donna June Peterson in 1952, and they were married 65 years until her death in 2017. Husmann's son, David Husmann (1953-2020), played football under Bill Yeoman at University of Houston and went on to have a storied career coaching high school football in Texas, finishing with 216 wins and 2 state titles while coaching in Schulenburg, Texas (1991 and 1992).
