= Minden High School (Minden, Nebraska) =

Location
- 325 No. Yates; Minden, Nebraska; United States
- Coordinates: 40°29′54″N 98°57′21″W

Information
- Type: Public school
- School district: Minden Public Schools
- Grades: 9th - 12th
- Enrollment: 264 (2022-2023)
- Colors: Purple and white
- Mascot: Whippets
- Conference: Southwest Conference
- Website: Minden H.S.

Minden High School (MHS) is a secondary school located in Minden, Nebraska, United States.

== About ==
MHS serves the town of Minden in Kearney County and the surrounding area. It takes in students from C.L. Jones Middle School and East Elementary School.

== Athletics ==
The Whippets are members of the Southwest Conference. They wear the colors of purple and white. MHS offers competition in basketball, cheer/dance, cross country, football, golf, softball, track & field, volleyball, and wrestling.
