= Nottingham Field =

Stadium in Greeley, Colorado

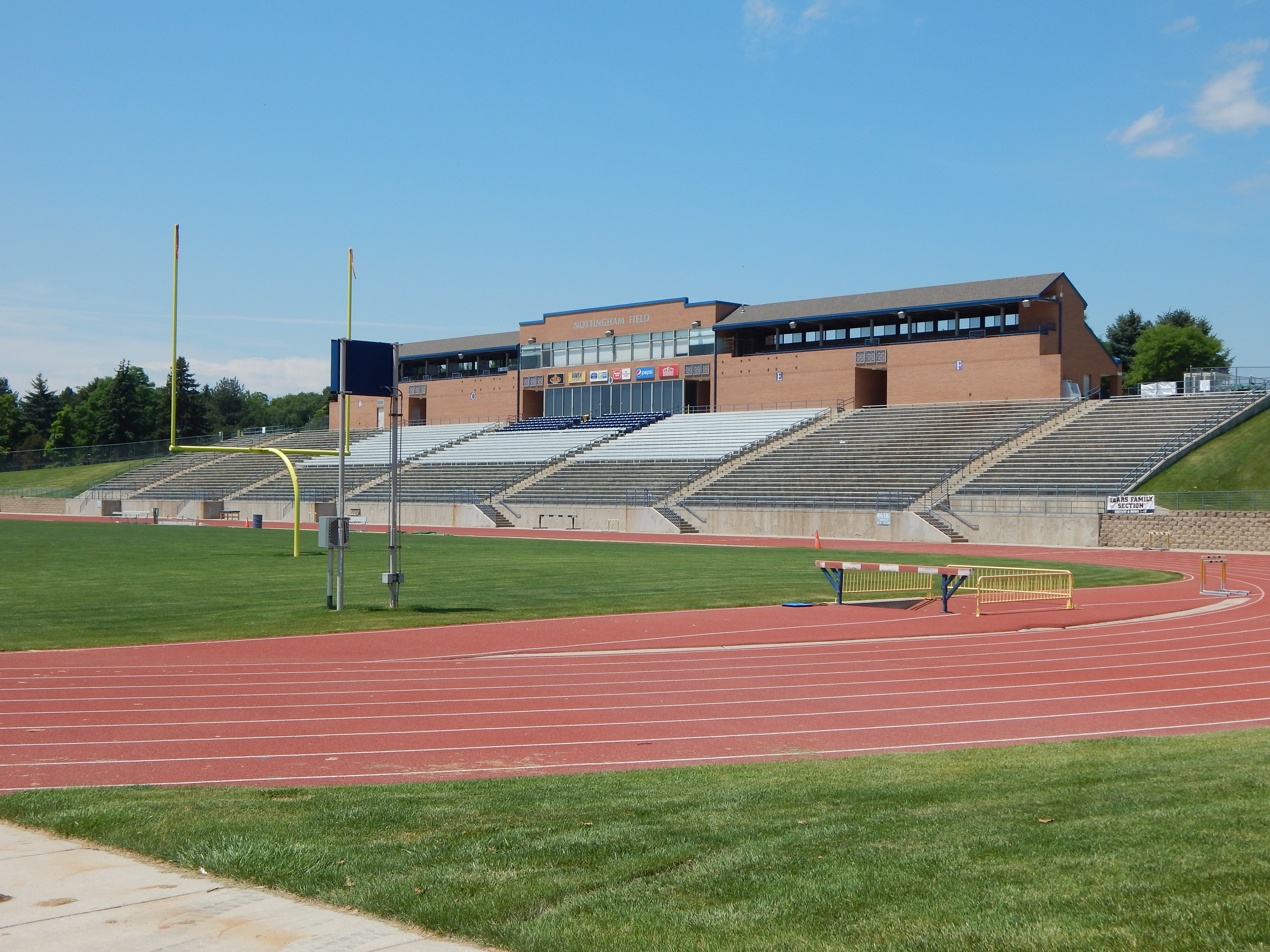
- View from northeast in 2015

- Location in the United States Location in Colorado
- Interactive map of Nottingham Field
- Location: University of Northern Colorado; Greeley, Colorado, U.S.
- Coordinates: 40°24′11″N 104°42′19″W
- Elevation: 4,780 feet (1,455 m) AMSL
- Owner: University of Northern Colorado
- Operator: University of Northern Colorado
- Capacity: 8,533
- Surface: Artificial turf

Construction
- Groundbreaking: 1994
- Opened: September 9, 1995; 31 years ago (Att. - 6,341)
- Cost: $4 million ($8.45 million in 2025)
- Architect: Sink Combs Dethlefs
- General contractor: Alliance Construction Solutions

Tenant
- Northern Colorado Bears football (NCAA)

Nottingham Field is an 8,533-seat multi-purpose stadium in the Western United States, located on the campus of the University of Northern Colorado in Greeley, Colorado. It is home to the Northern Colorado Bears football and track and field programs.

== History ==
Nottingham Field was erected in 1995 to relieve the aging facilities at Jackson Field. UNC won consecutive Division II national football titles in 1996 and 1997, their second and third seasons at Nottingham Field. The Bears moved up to Division I-AA (now FCS) in 2004 and joined the Big Sky Conference in 2006.

The stadium's initial capacity was 6,500 and it is named for Victor R. Nottingham, a former Colorado State College of Education (UNC) student body president who spearheaded the effort to raise private funds for the entire $4 million project.. Nottingham, was the first $100,000 donor to UNC athletics. In 2014, the school replaced his regular season ticket seat with a gold seat to honor his legacy.

The field is aligned north-northeast to south-southwest at an approximate elevation of 4,780 feet (1,455 m) above sea level.

=== Renovations ===
Prior to the 2005 season, the stadium's seating capacity was expanded to over 8,500 with an additional 1,500 possible in the endzone and the natural grass hill in the northwest corner of the stadium, by expanding the east stands.

In 2015 a scoreboard structure including a Daktronics video board, Bear Vision, was erected beyond the south endzone of the field.

In 2021 the field's surface was updated to IRONTURF. The donor-funded project was completed by Academy Sports Turf, Inc. and premiered in the Bears home opener against Lamar.

== Gallery ==
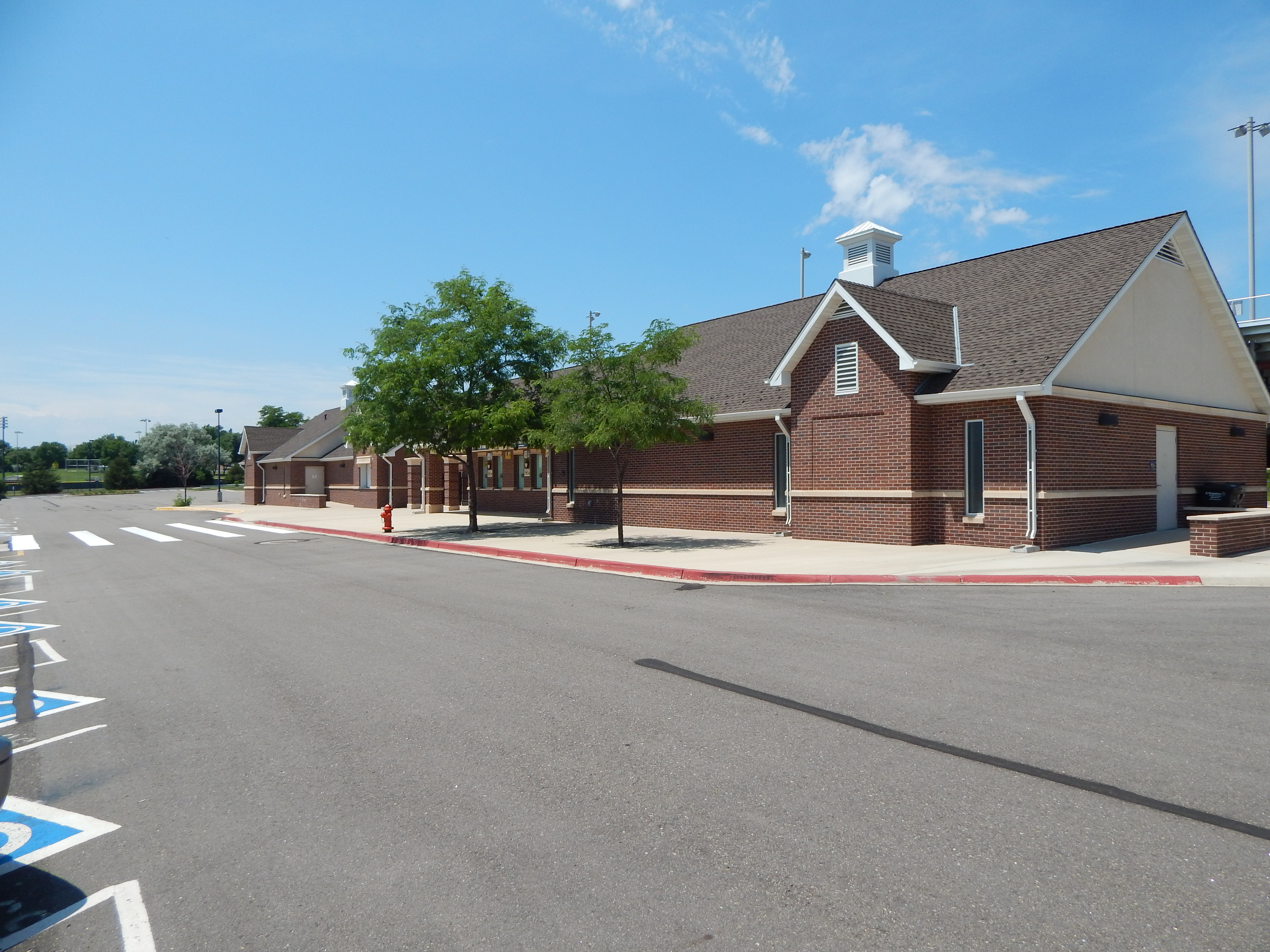
East side fieldhouse

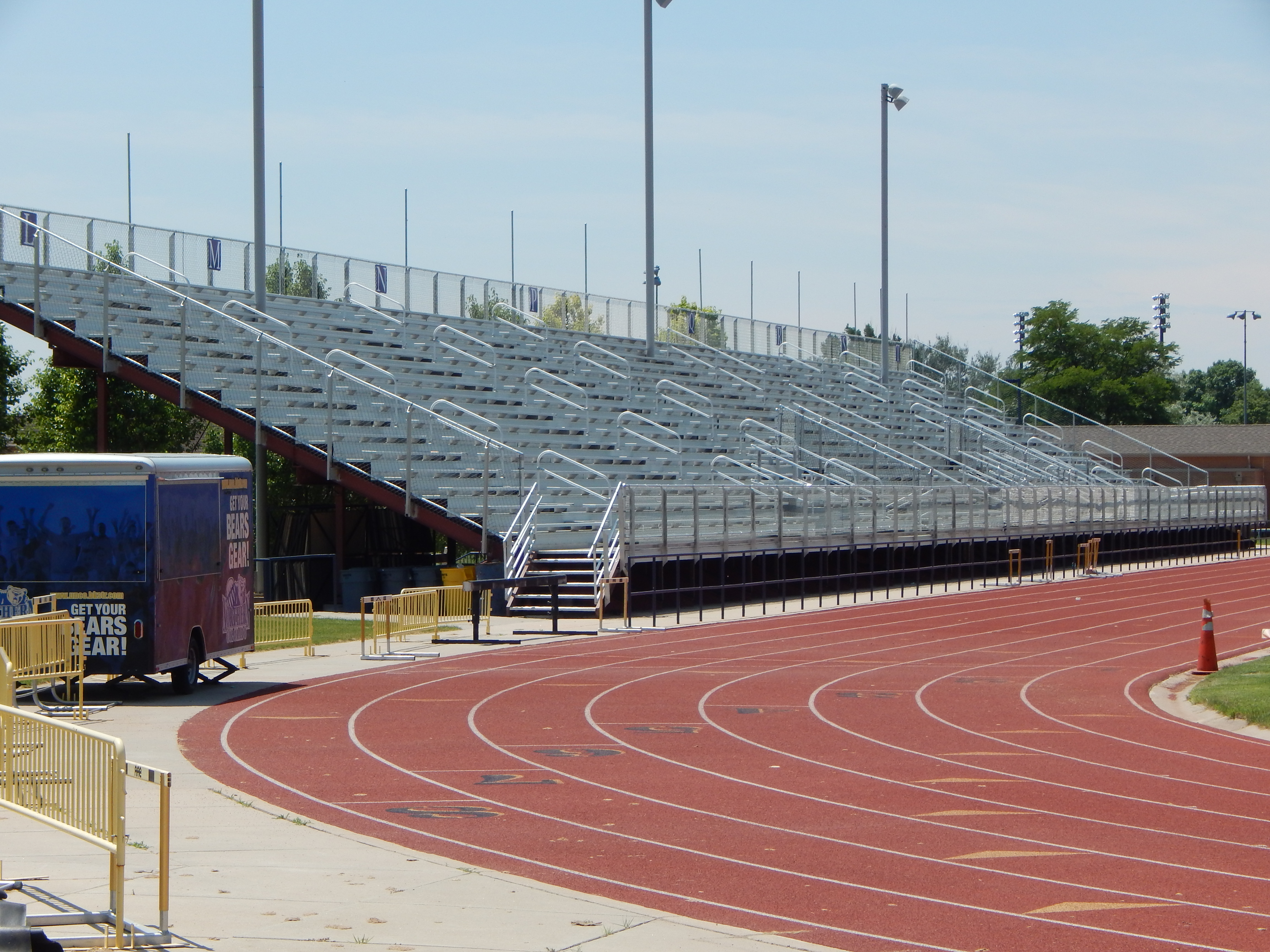
East side seating

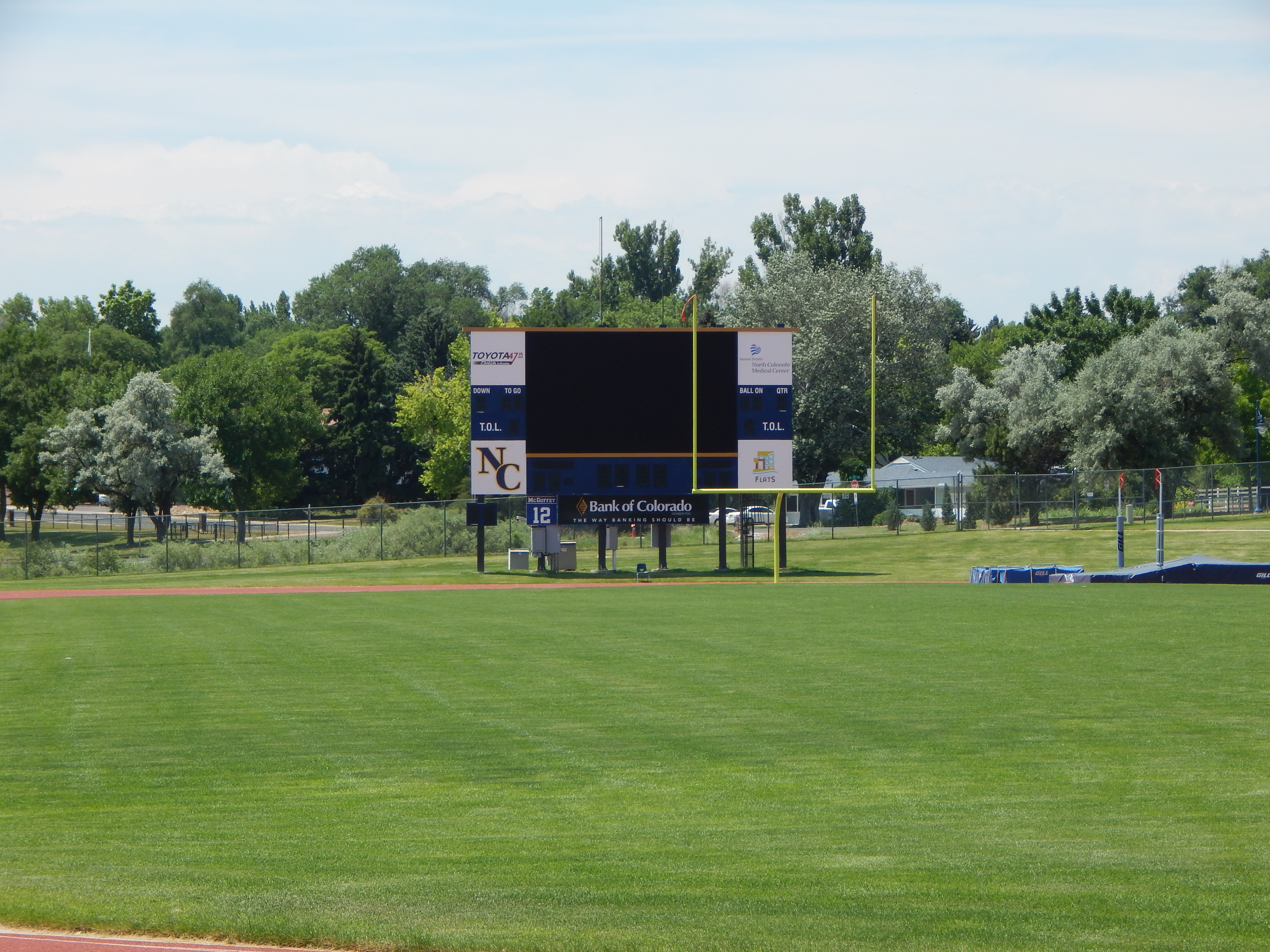
Nottingham Field scoreboard

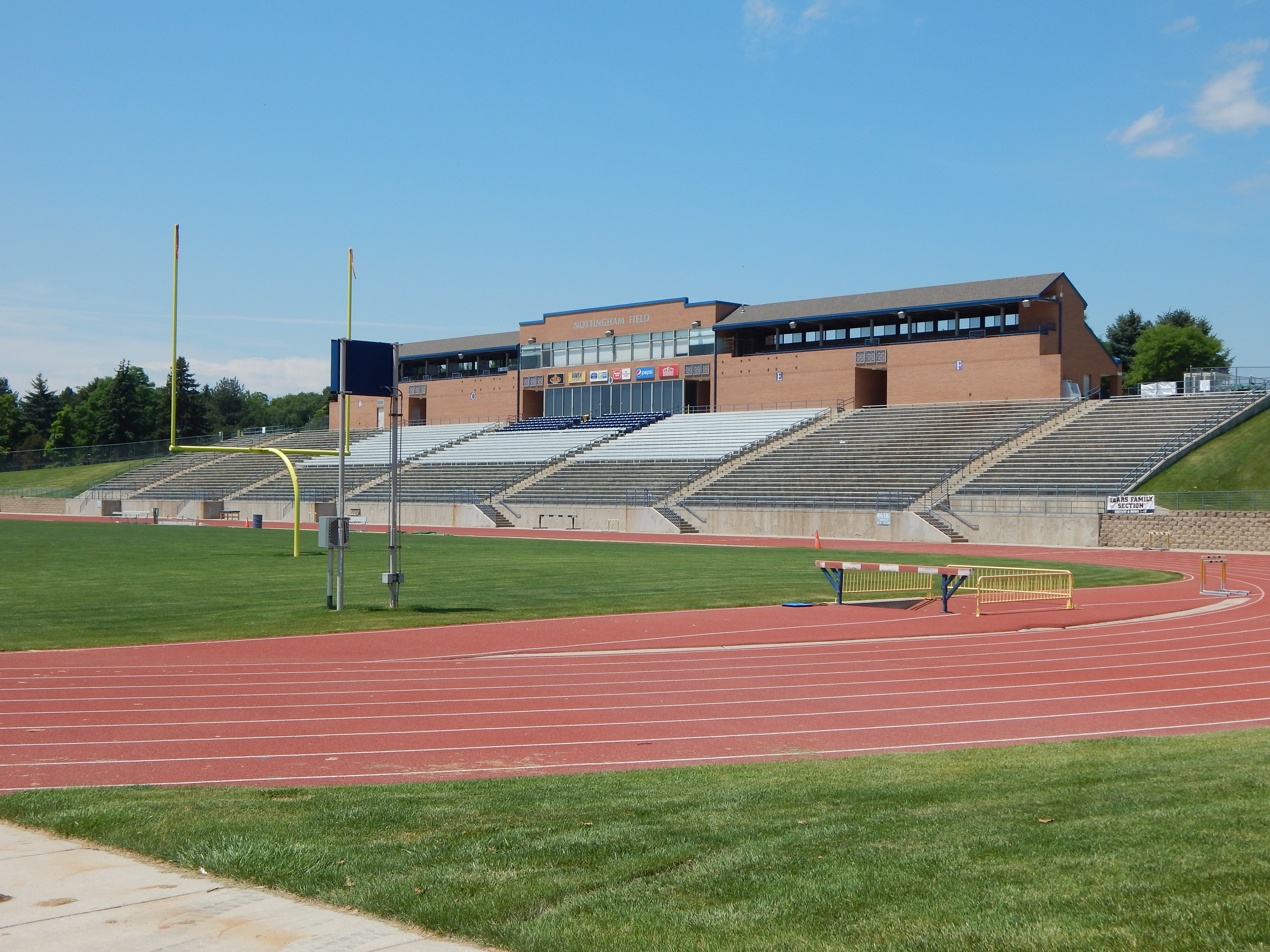
West side seating

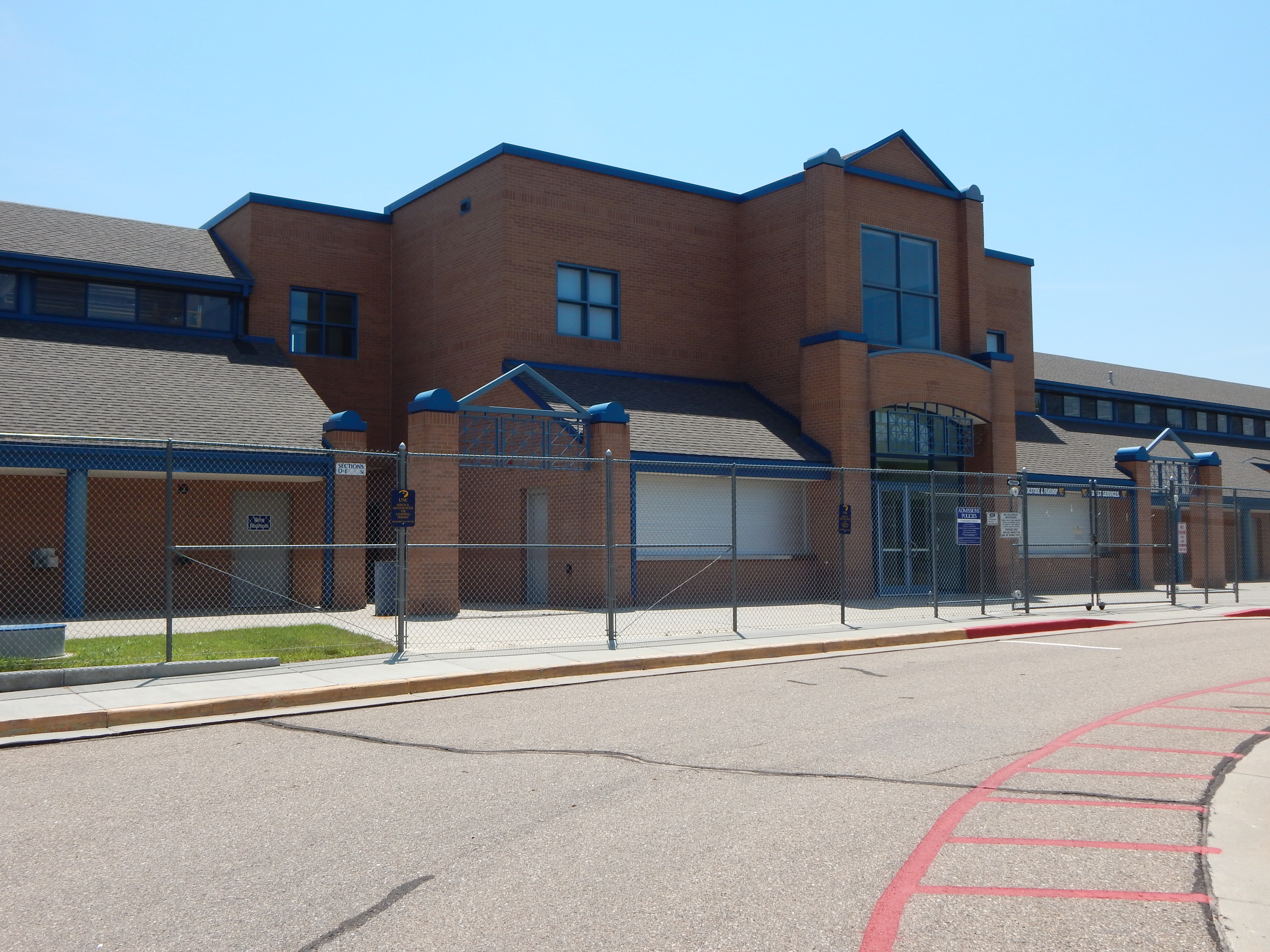
West side entrance and concessions

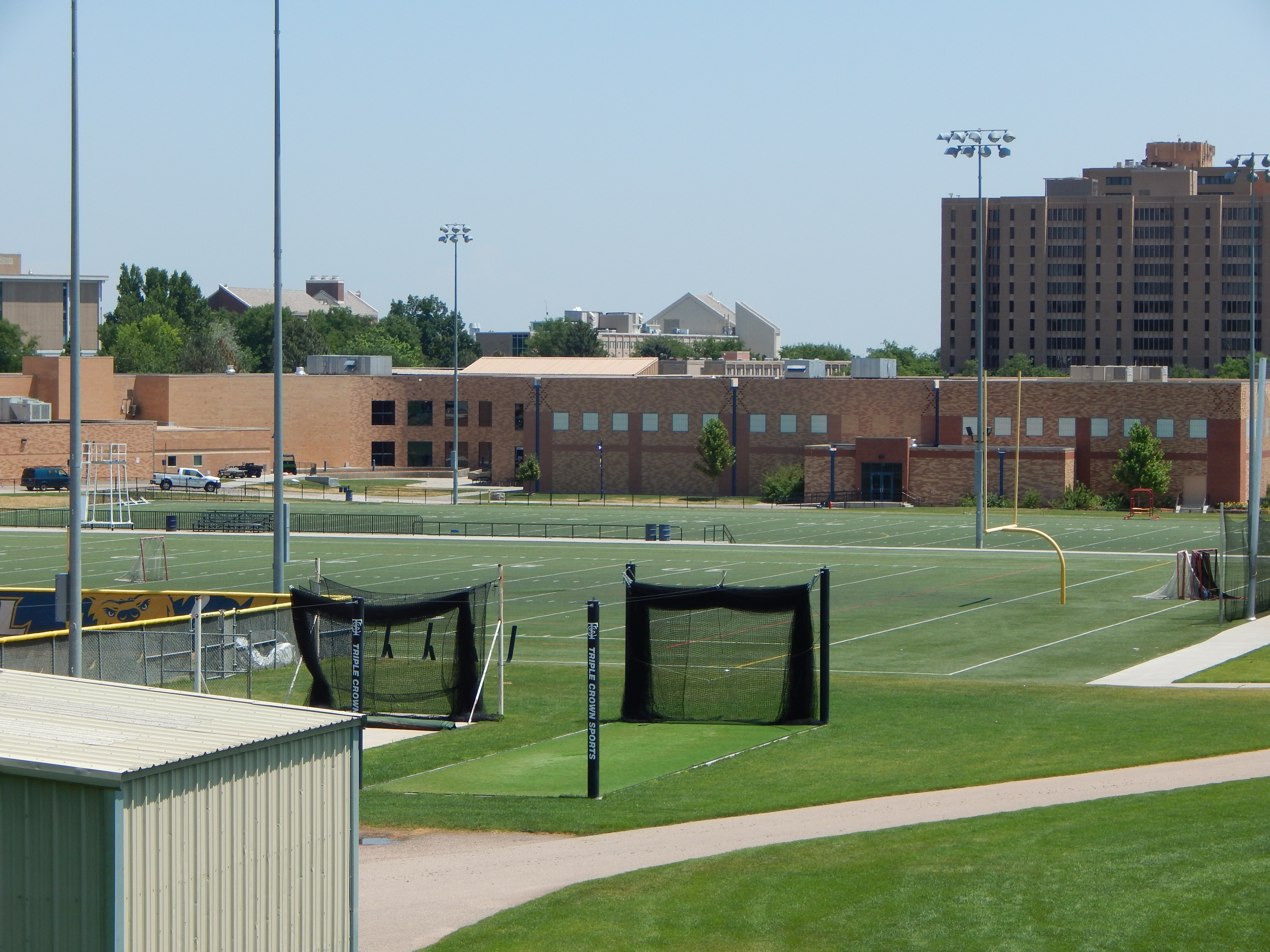
Football practice fields

== See also ==
- List of NCAA Division I FCS football stadiums
