= 1997 NCAA Division II football season =

American college football season

- Regular season: September 6 – November 15, 1997
- Playoffs: November 22 – December 13, 1997
- National Championship: Braly Municipal Stadium; Florence, AL
- Champion: Northern Colorado
- Harlon Hill Trophy: Irvin Singler, Bloomsburg

The 1997 NCAA Division II football season, part of college football in the United States organized by the National Collegiate Athletic Association at the Division II level, began on September 6, 1997, and concluded with the NCAA Division II Football Championship on December 13, 1997, at Braly Municipal Stadium in Florence, Alabama, hosted by the University of North Alabama.

Northern Colorado defeated New Haven in the championship game, 51–0, to win their second Division II national title.

The Harlon Hill Trophy was awarded to Irvin Sigler, running back from Bloomsburg.

== Conference changes and new programs ==
| Team | 1996 conference | 1997 conference |
|---|---|---|
| Chico State | NCAC | dropped program |
| East Central | Oklahoma Intercollegiate (NAIA) | Lone Star |
| Elon | South Atlantic | Independent |
| Harding | Independent (NAIA) | Lone Star |
| Humboldt State | NCAC | Columbia (NAIA) |
| Mississippi College | Independent | American Southwest (D-III) |
| Norfolk State | Central Intercollegiate Athletic Association | NCAA Division I-AA independent |
| Northeastern State | Oklahoma Intercollegiate (NAIA) | Lone Star |
| Oklahoma Panhandle State | Oklahoma Intercollegiate (NAIA) | Independent |
| Ouachita Baptist | Independent (NAIA) | Lone Star |
| Sonoma State | NCAC | dropped program |
| Southeastern Oklahoma State | Oklahoma Intercollegiate (NAIA) | Lone Star |
| Southwestern Oklahoma State | Oklahoma Intercollegiate (NAIA) | Lone Star |

== Conference standings ==
1997 Central Intercollegiate Athletic Association football standings
| | Conf. | | | Overall |
| Team | W | | L | W | | L |
|---|---|---|---|---|---|---|
| Virginia State + | 5 | – | 2 | 8 | – | 2 |
| Livingstone + | 5 | – | 2 | 8 | – | 3 |
| Virginia Union + | 5 | – | 2 | 7 | – | 4 |
| Winston-Salem State | 4 | – | 3 | 6 | – | 4 |
| North Carolina Central | 4 | – | 3 | 4 | – | 7 |
| Fayetteville State | 3 | – | 4 | 4 | – | 7 |
| Bowie State | 2 | – | 5 | 4 | – | 6 |
| Elizabeth City State | 1 | – | 6 | 2 | – | 8 |
| Johnson C. Smith | 1 | – | 6 | 2 | – | 8 |
+ – Conference co-champions; Livingstone forfeited conference wins over Virginia Union and Bowie State.

1997 Eastern Football Conference standings
| | Conf. | | | Overall |
| Team | W | | L | W | | L |
|---|---|---|---|---|---|---|
Atlantic Division
| Albany xy$ | 8 | – | 0 | 11 | – | 1 |
| Southern Connecticut | 6 | – | 2 | 7 | – | 4 |
| C. W. Post | 5 | – | 3 | 6 | – | 4 |
| Stony Brook | 4 | – | 4 | 4 | – | 6 |
| Pace | 3 | – | 4 | 4 | – | 5 |
| Sacred Heart | 1 | – | 7 | 1 | – | 9 |
Bay State Division
| American International xy | 8 | – | 0 | 8 | – | 4 |
| Bentley | 5 | – | 3 | 6 | – | 3 |
| Stonehill | 3 | – | 5 | 4 | – | 6 |
| Merrimack | 3 | – | 5 | 3 | – | 6 |
| UMass Lowell | 1 | – | 7 | 2 | – | 8 |
| Assumption | 0 | – | 7 | 0 | – | 9 |
Championship: Albany 27, American International 20
$ – Conference champion; x – Division champion/co-champions; y – Championship game participant

1997 Gulf South Conference football standings
| | Conf. | | | Overall |
| Team | W | | L | W | | L |
|---|---|---|---|---|---|---|
| No. 10 Southern Arkansas +^ | 6 | – | 1 | 9 | – | 2 |
| West Georgia + | 6 | – | 1 | 8 | – | 2 |
| No. 13 North Alabama | 6 | – | 2 | 9 | – | 3 |
| Central Arkansas | 5 | – | 3 | 6 | – | 3 |
| Valdosta State | 5 | – | 3 | 6 | – | 5 |
| Arkansas Tech | 4 | – | 4 | 4 | – | 7 |
| Henderson State | 3 | – | 5 | 4 | – | 6 |
| Delta State | 3 | – | 6 | 3 | – | 7 |
| West Alabama | 1 | – | 6 | 4 | – | 6 |
| Arkansas–Monticello | 0 | – | 8 | 0 | – | 10 |
+ – Conference co-champions; ^ – NCAA Division II playoff participant; Rankings from NCAA Division II Football Committee poll

1997 Lone Star Conference football standings
| | Conf. | | | Overall |
| Team | W | | L | W | | L |
|---|---|---|---|---|---|---|
Overall
| No. 4 Texas A&M–Kingsville $^ | 9 | – | 0 | 9 | – | 2 |
| No. 6 Angelo State ^ | 8 | – | 1 | 10 | – | 2 |
| Central Oklahoma | 7 | – | 2 | 9 | – | 2 |
| West Texas A&M | 6 | – | 3 | 7 | – | 4 |
| SW Oklahoma State | 5 | – | 4 | 5 | – | 5 |
| Abilene Christian | 5 | – | 4 | 7 | – | 4 |
| Northeastern State | 4 | – | 4 | 4 | – | 7 |
| SE Oklahoma State | 3 | – | 5 | 3 | – | 7 |
| Harding | 3 | – | 5 | 5 | – | 5 |
| Ouachita Baptist | 3 | – | 5 | 4 | – | 6 |
| Texas A&M–Commerce | 3 | – | 6 | 3 | – | 8 |
| Eastern New Mexico | 3 | – | 6 | 5 | – | 6 |
| Midwestern State | 3 | – | 6 | 3 | – | 7 |
| Tarleton State | 3 | – | 6 | 4 | – | 7 |
| East Central | 0 | – | 8 | 0 | – | 10 |
North
| Central Oklahoma x | 5 | – | 1 | 9 | – | 2 |
| SW Oklahoma State x | 5 | – | 1 | 5 | – | 5 |
| Northeastern State | 4 | – | 2 | 4 | – | 7 |
| Harding | 3 | – | 3 | 5 | – | 5 |
| Ouachita Baptist | 3 | – | 3 | 4 | – | 6 |
| SE Oklahoma State | 1 | – | 5 | 3 | – | 7 |
| East Central | 0 | – | 6 | 0 | – | 10 |
South
| No. 4 Texas A&M–Kingsville x$^ | 7 | – | 0 | 9 | – | 2 |
| No. 6 Angelo State ^ | 6 | – | 1 | 10 | – | 2 |
| Abilene Christian | 4 | – | 3 | 7 | – | 4 |
| West Texas A&M | 4 | – | 3 | 7 | – | 4 |
| Eastern New Mexico | 2 | – | 5 | 5 | – | 6 |
| Tarleton State | 2 | – | 5 | 4 | – | 7 |
| Texas A&M–Commerce | 3 | – | 5 | 3 | – | 8 |
| Midwestern State | 1 | – | 6 | 3 | – | 7 |
$ – Conference champion; ^ – NCAA Division II playoff participant; Rankings from NCAA Division II Football Committee poll

1997 Mid-America Intercollegiate Athletics Association football standings
| | Conf. | | | Overall |
| Team | W | | L | W | | L |
|---|---|---|---|---|---|---|
| No. 3 NW Missouri State $^ | 9 | – | 0 | 12 | – | 1 |
| No. 8 Pittsburg State ^ | 8 | – | 1 | 9 | – | 2 |
| Missouri Southern | 6 | – | 3 | 7 | – | 3 |
| Truman State | 6 | – | 3 | 6 | – | 4 |
| Emporia State | 5 | – | 4 | 7 | – | 4 |
| Central Missouri State | 4 | – | 5 | 5 | – | 6 |
| Missouri Western | 3 | – | 6 | 5 | – | 6 |
| Washburn | 2 | – | 7 | 3 | – | 8 |
| Missouri–Rolla | 2 | – | 7 | 3 | – | 8 |
| Southwest Baptist | 0 | – | 9 | 0 | – | 10 |
$ – Conference champion; ^ – NCAA Division II playoff participant; Rankings from NCAA Division II Football Committee poll

1997 Midwest Intercollegiate Football Conference standings
| | Conf. | | | Overall |
| Team | W | | L | W | | L |
|---|---|---|---|---|---|---|
| No. 12 Ashland +^ | 9 | – | 1 | 9 | – | 2 |
| Grand Valley State + | 9 | – | 1 | 9 | – | 1 |
| Saginaw Valley State | 8 | – | 2 | 9 | – | 2 |
| Indianapolis | 7 | – | 3 | 8 | – | 3 |
| Northern Michigan | 6 | – | 4 | 7 | – | 4 |
| Hillsdale | 4 | – | 6 | 4 | – | 7 |
| Ferris State | 3 | – | 7 | 3 | – | 7 |
| Northwood | 3 | – | 7 | 3 | – | 7 |
| Wayne State (MI) | 3 | – | 7 | 3 | – | 8 |
| Michigan Tech | 2 | – | 8 | 2 | – | 8 |
| St. Francis (IL) | 1 | – | 9 | 1 | – | 9 |
+ – Conference co-champions; ^ – NCAA Division II playoff participant; Rankings from NCAA Division II Football Committee poll

1997 North Central Conference football standings
| | Conf. | | | Overall |
| Team | W | | L | W | | L |
|---|---|---|---|---|---|---|
| No. 11 Northern Colorado $^ | 8 | – | 1 | 13 | – | 2 |
| North Dakota | 7 | – | 2 | 8 | – | 2 |
| No. 16 North Dakota State ^ | 7 | – | 2 | 9 | – | 3 |
| Nebraska–Omaha | 6 | – | 3 | 8 | – | 3 |
| St. Cloud State | 5 | – | 4 | 6 | – | 5 |
| South Dakota | 3 | – | 6 | 5 | – | 6 |
| Augustana (SD) | 3 | – | 6 | 5 | – | 6 |
| Mankato State | 3 | – | 6 | 4 | – | 7 |
| South Dakota State | 3 | – | 6 | 4 | – | 6 |
| Morningside | 0 | – | 9 | 0 | – | 11 |
$ – Conference champion; ^ – NCAA Division II playoff participant; Rankings from NCAA Division II Football Committee poll

1997 Northern Sun Intercollegiate Conference football standings
| | Conf. | | | Overall |
| Team | W | | L | W | | L |
|---|---|---|---|---|---|---|
| Winona State $ | 6 | – | 0 | 9 | – | 2 |
| Minnesota Duluth | 4 | – | 2 | 4 | – | 6 |
| Southwest State (MN) | 3 | – | 3 | 5 | – | 6 |
| Moorhead State | 3 | – | 3 | 5 | – | 5 |
| Northern State | 3 | – | 3 | 4 | – | 7 |
| Minnesota Morris | 1 | – | 5 | 3 | – | 7 |
| Bemidji State | 1 | – | 5 | 2 | – | 8 |
$ – Conference champion

1997 Pennsylvania State Athletic Conference football standings
| | Conf. | | | Overall |
| Team | W | | L | W | | L |
|---|---|---|---|---|---|---|
East Division
| Bloomsburg x | 6 | – | 0 | 8 | – | 2 |
| Millersville | 4 | – | 2 | 7 | – | 3 |
| West Chester | 4 | – | 2 | 5 | – | 6 |
| Kutztown | 3 | – | 3 | 6 | – | 4 |
| East Stroudsburg | 3 | – | 3 | 4 | – | 6 |
| Mansfield | 1 | – | 5 | 1 | – | 10 |
| Cheyney | 0 | – | 6 | 0 | – | 11 |
West Division
| No. 7 Slippery Rock x^ | 6 | – | 0 | 11 | – | 2 |
| Shippensburg | 4 | – | 2 | 6 | – | 4 |
| IUP | 4 | – | 2 | 5 | – | 5 |
| Edinboro | 2 | – | 4 | 4 | – | 6 |
| Clarion | 2 | – | 4 | 3 | – | 7 |
| Lock Haven | 2 | – | 4 | 3 | – | 8 |
| California (PA) | 1 | – | 5 | 2 | – | 8 |
x – Division champion/co-champions; ^ – NCAA Division II playoff participant; Rankings from NCAA Division II Football Committee poll

1997 Rocky Mountain Athletic Conference football standings
| | Conf. | | | Overall |
| Team | W | | L | W | | L |
|---|---|---|---|---|---|---|
| Western State (CO) $^ | 7 | – | 1 | 9 | – | 3 |
| Chadron State | 6 | – | 2 | 8 | – | 3 |
| New Mexico Highlands | 6 | – | 2 | 8 | – | 3 |
| Nebraska–Kearney | 6 | – | 2 | 7 | – | 4 |
| Fort Hays State | 4 | – | 4 | 5 | – | 6 |
| Fort Lewis | 3 | – | 5 | 4 | – | 7 |
| Mesa State | 2 | – | 6 | 4 | – | 7 |
| Colorado Mines | 1 | – | 7 | 3 | – | 8 |
| Adams State | 1 | – | 7 | 1 | – | 10 |
$ – Conference champion; ^ – NCAA Division II playoff participant

1997 South Atlantic Conference football standings
| | Conf. | | | Overall |
| Team | W | | L | W | | L |
|---|---|---|---|---|---|---|
| No. 1 Carson–Newman $^ | 7 | – | 0 | 11 | – | 1 |
| Catawba | 5 | – | 2 | 8 | – | 3 |
| Gardner–Webb | 4 | – | 3 | 8 | – | 3 |
| Wingate | 4 | – | 3 | 8 | – | 3 |
| Mars Hill | 3 | – | 4 | 5 | – | 5 |
| Presbyterian | 3 | – | 4 | 5 | – | 6 |
| Newberry | 2 | – | 5 | 4 | – | 7 |
| Lenoir–Rhyne | 0 | – | 7 | 0 | – | 10 |
$ – Conference champion; ^ – NCAA Division II playoff participant; Rankings from NCAA Division II Football Committee poll

1997 Southern Intercollegiate Athletic Conference football standings
| | Conf. | | | Overall |
| Team | W | | L | W | | L |
|---|---|---|---|---|---|---|
| No. 5 Albany State $^ | 6 | – | 0 | 11 | – | 1 |
| Alabama A&M | 4 | – | 2 | 7 | – | 4 |
| Kentucky State | 4 | – | 2 | 7 | – | 5 |
| Fort Valley State | 4 | – | 2 | 5 | – | 6 |
| Tuskegee | 3 | – | 3 | 7 | – | 4 |
| Morris Brown | 3 | – | 3 | 6 | – | 5 |
| Miles | 3 | – | 3 | 4 | – | 6 |
| Clark Atlanta | 2 | – | 4 | 4 | – | 7 |
| Savannah State | 1 | – | 5 | 3 | – | 8 |
| Morehouse | 0 | – | 6 | 3 | – | 8 |
$ – Conference champion; ^ – NCAA Division II playoff participant; Rankings from NCAA Division II Football Committee poll

1997 West Virginia Intercollegiate Athletic Conference football standings
| | Conf. | | | Overall |
| Team | W | | L | W | | L |
|---|---|---|---|---|---|---|
| Shepherd + | 6 | – | 1 | 9 | – | 1 |
| No. 15 Glenville State +^ | 6 | – | 1 | 9 | – | 3 |
| West Virginia Wesleyan | 5 | – | 2 | 5 | – | 5 |
| Concord | 3 | – | 4 | 5 | – | 5 |
| Fairmont State | 3 | – | 4 | 5 | – | 6 |
| West Virginia State | 3 | – | 4 | 5 | – | 6 |
| West Liberty State | 2 | – | 5 | 4 | – | 6 |
| West Virginia Tech | 0 | – | 7 | 0 | – | 11 |
+ – Conference co-champions; ^ – NCAA Division II playoff participant; Rankings from NCAA Division II Football Committee poll

1997 NCAA Division II independents football records
| | Conf. | | | Overall |
| Team | W | | L | W | | L |
|---|---|---|---|---|---|---|
| No. 2 New Haven ^ | | – | | 12 | – | 2 |
| Mercyhurst | | – | | 6 | – | 3 |
| No. 14 UC Davis ^ | | – | | 9 | – | 5 |
| Elon | | – | | 7 | – | 4 |
| Western New Mexico | | – | | 5 | – | 5 |
| Saint Joseph's (IN) | | – | | 5 | – | 6 |
| Oklahoma Panhandle State | | – | | 3 | – | 7 |
| Wayne State (NE) | | – | | 3 | – | 7 |
| Quincy | | – | | 0 | – | 10 |
^ – NCAA Division II playoff participant; Rankings from NCAA Division II Football Committee poll

== Conference summaries ==
Conference Champions

Central Intercollegiate Athletic Association – Livingstone, Virginia State, and Virginia Union
Eastern Collegiate Football Conference – Albany
Gulf South Conference – Southern Arkansas and West Georgia
Lone Star Conference – Texas A&M–Kingsville
Mid-America Intercollegiate Athletics Association – Northwest Missouri State
Midwest Intercollegiate Football Conference – Grand Valley State and Ashland
North Central Conference – Northern Colorado
Northern Sun Intercollegiate Conference – Winona State
Pennsylvania State Athletic Conference – Bloomsburg (East), Slippery Rock (West)
Rocky Mountain Athletic Conference – Western State (CO)
South Atlantic Conference – Carson-Newman
Southern Intercollegiate Athletic Conference – Albany State
West Virginia Intercollegiate Athletic Conference – Glenville State and Shepherd

== Postseason ==
1997 NCAA Division II Football Championship
- Teams: 16
- Finals Site: Braly Municipal Stadium; Florence, AL
- Champion: Northern Colorado; (2nd title, title game)
- Runner-up: New Haven; (1st title game)
- Semifinalists: Carson–Newman; UC Davis
- Winning coach: championship

The 1997 NCAA Division II Football Championship playoffs were the 24th single-elimination tournament to determine the national champion of men's NCAA Division II college football. The championship game was held at Braly Municipal Stadium in Florence, Alabama, for the 11th time.

=== Playoff bracket ===
First round Campus sites
UC Davis | 37
Texas A&M–Kingsville† | 34
Angelo State | 46
Western State (CO) | 20
New Haven | 47
Glenville State | 7
Slippery Rock | 30
Ashland | 20
Northwest Missouri State | 39
North Dakota State | 28
Northern Colorado | 24
Pittsburg State | 16
Carson–Newman | 21
North Alabama | 7
Albany State | 10
Southern Arkansas | 6

Quarterfinals; Campus sites
UC Davis | 50
Angelo State | 33
New Haven | 49
Slippery Rock | 21
Northwest Missouri State | 19
Northern Colorado | 35
Carson–Newman | 23
Albany State | 22

Semifinals; Campus sites
UC Davis | 25
New Haven | 27
Northern Colorado | 30
Carson–Newman | 29

Championship; Braly Municipal Stadium; Florence, AL
New Haven | 0
Northern Colorado | 51

== See also ==
- 1997 NCAA Division I-A football season
- 1997 NCAA Division I-AA football season
- 1997 NCAA Division III football season
- 1997 NAIA Division I football season
- 1997 NAIA Division II football season
