= Valentine High School =

Location
- 431 N Green St; Valentine, Cherry, Nebraska 69201-1969; United States
- Coordinates: 42.8775°N 100.5399°W

Information
- Type: Public high school
- School district: Valentine Community Schools
- NCES District ID: 3178020
- School code: NE-160006000-160006001
- CEEB code: 282395
- NCES School ID: 317802001674
- Faculty: 20.57 (on an FTE basis)
- Grades: 9-12
- Enrollment: 164 (2022–2023)
  - Grade 9: 35
  - Grade 10: 39
  - Grade 11: 37
  - Grade 12: 53
- Student to teacher ratio: 7.97:1
- Campus type: Town: remote
- Athletics conference: Southwest Conference
- Nickname: Badgers
- USNWR ranking: 13,242–17,655
- Website: www.valentinecommunityschools.org/page/valentinehigh

Valentine High School is a secondary school located in Valentine, Nebraska, United States.

It is the sole comprehensive high school in the Valentine Community Schools school district, which includes Valentine, Crookston, and Wood Lake.

== About ==
Valentine High School is part of Valentine Community Schools, which includes students from Valentine Elementary School and Valentine Middle School as well as two rural K-8 schools.

It was formerly a part of Valentine City Schools, which merged into Valentine Community Schools in 2006.

== Extracurricular activities ==
The Badgers are members of the Southwest Conference. They are a part of NSAA District 6. The school offers extracurriculars in the form of seasonal sports, activities, and societies.

List of Extracurriculars
All-Year	Broadcasting
All-Year	Cheerleading/Dance
All-Year	FBLA
All-Year	FFA
All-Year	Fishing Club
All-Year	Flags
All-Year	Honor Society
All-Year	Journalism
All-Year	Music (Instrumental)
All-Year	Music (Vocal)
All-Year	Student Council
All-Year	TeamMates
All-Year	Yearbook
Fall	Cross Country (Boys)
Fall	Cross Country (Girls)
Fall	Football
Fall	Golf (Girls)
Fall	Mock Trial
Fall	Play Production
Fall	Volleyball
Winter	Basketball (Boys)
Winter	Basketball (Girls)
Winter	Speech
Winter	Wrestling (Boys)
Winter	Wrestling (Girls)
Spring	Golf (Boys)
Spring	Quiz Bowl
Spring	Track & Field (Boys)
Spring	Track & Field (Girls)
