= Gothenburg High School =

Public high school in Gothenburg, Nebraska

Location
- 1322 Avenue I Gothenburg, Nebraska; United States; 40°55′55″N 100°09′20″W

Information
- Other name: Gothenburg Secondary School; Gothenburg Junior / Senior High
- School type: Public, Secondary school
- Established: 1883; 143 years ago
- School district: Gothenburg Public Schools
- Teaching staff: 25.29 (FTE) (2022-23)
- Grades: 7–12
- Enrollment: 389 (2022–23)
- Student to teacher ratio: 15.38 (2022–23)
- Colors: Cardinal and white
- Athletics conference: Southwest Conference
- Team name: Swedes
- Website: www.gothenburgswedes.org/junior/senior-high-home

Gothenburg High School (GHS) is a secondary school located in Gothenburg, Nebraska, United States.

== About ==
GHS is paired with Gothenburg Junior High School in the same building.

Students are offered a curriculum that includes agriculture, art, business/computer, English, family & consumer, foreign language, industrial technology, mathematics, music, physical education, science, and social studies, as well as student aid, driver education, independent studies, and online courses.

Clubs include art club, FFA, journalism, National Honor Society, one acts, speech, and student council.

== Athletics ==
The Swedes are members of the Southwest Conference and sport the colors of cardinal and white. The school offers competition in basketball, cheerleading, cross country, football, golf, softball, track & field, volleyball, wrestling, band, choir, speech, and one act.

== Notable people ==
=== Faculty ===
- Don Welch, poet

=== Alumni ===
- Milan Creighton, former NFL player
- Jay Novacek, former NFL player
