= Southwest Conference (Nebraska) =

The Southwest Conference is a Nebraska School Activities Association-sponsored league with 7 members across the state of Nebraska.

== Members ==
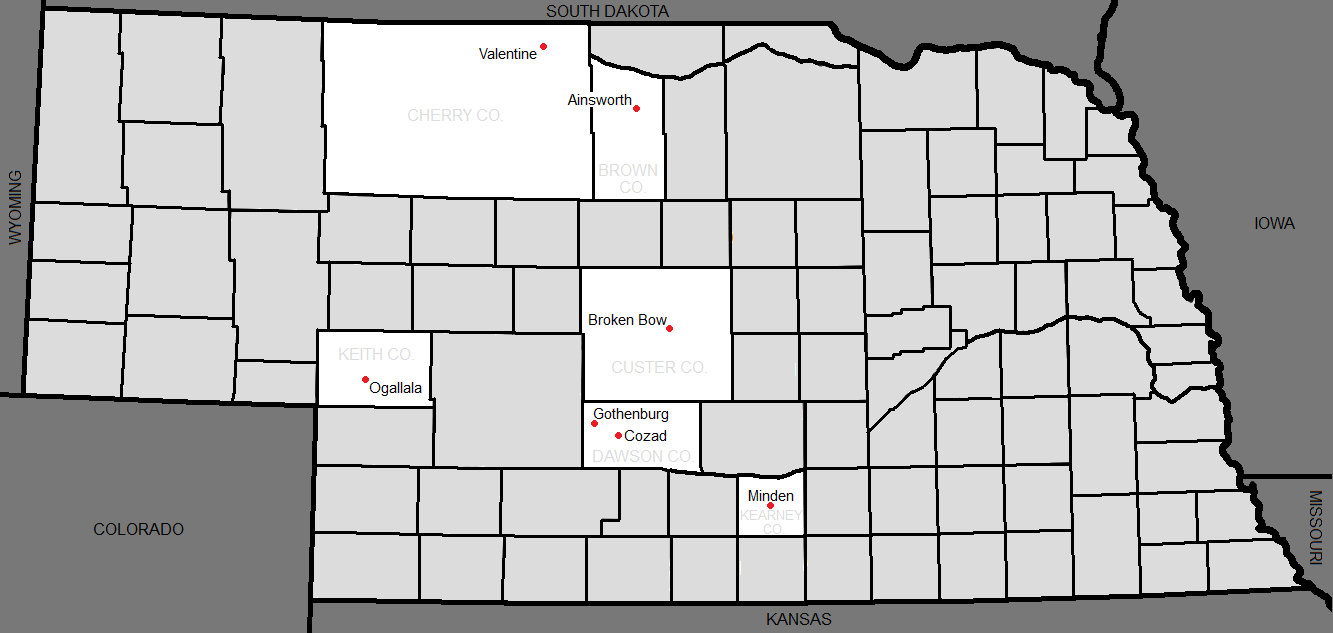
The members of the Southwest Conference.

School	Nickname	Colors	Address	Years
Ainsworth	Bulldogs	Red & White	520 East 2nd Ainsworth, NE 69210	2005-2023
Broken Bow	Indians	Red & White	323 N. 7th Broken Bow, NE 68822	Current
Cozad	Haymaykers	Red & Black	1710 Meridian Ave. Cozad, NE 69130	Current
Gothenburg	Swedes	Cardinal & White	1322 Avenue I Gothenburg, NE 69138	Current
Holdrege	Dusters	Purple & Gold	600 12th Avenue; Holdrege, NE 68949	Current
McCook	Bison	Red & White	700 West 7th McCook, NE 69001	Current
Minden	Whippets	Purple & White	325 No. Yates; Minden, NE 68959	Current
Ogallala	Indians	Orange & Black	801 East 'O' St. Ogallala, NE 69153	Current
Valentine	Badgers	Red & White	431 N. Green; Valentine, NE 69201	2005-2025
