= Valentine City Schools =

School district in Nebraska, United States

Valentine City Schools was a school district headquartered in Valentine, Nebraska.

== History ==
In fall 1954 the district had 735 students, and this was down to 719 in fall 1955.

In 1959, the school district got a conditional deed to land owned by the city government on the condition the school district built an educational facility on the land.

In 1998, the Tioga Burge Public School school district dissolved, with Valentine City Schools receiving a portion of the district area. In 2006, Valentine City Schools merged into Valentine Community Schools, along with various rural school districts.
