= 1997 NCAA Division II football rankings =

The 1997 NCAA Division II football rankings are from the NCAA Division II football committee. This is for the 1997 season.

== Legend ==
	Increase in ranking
	Decrease in ranking
	Not ranked previous week
(#–#)	Win–loss record
(Italics)	Number of first place votes
т	Tied with team above or below also with this symbol

== NCAA Division II Football Committee poll ==
	Preseason	Week 1 Sept 9	Week 2 Sept 16	Week 3 Sept 23	Week 4 Sept 30	Week 5 Oct 7	Week 6 Oct 14	Week 7 Oct 21	Week 8 Oct 28	Week 9 Nov 4	Week 10 Nov 11	Week 11 Nov 18 (Note: The final poll had only 16 teams instead of 20. The 16 teams were the ones that made the Division II playoffs.)	
1.	Northern Colorado (4)	Northern Colorado (1–0) (3)	Carson–Newman (2–0) (4)	Carson–Newman (3–0) (4)	Carson–Newman (3–0) (4)	Carson–Newman (4–0) (4)	Carson–Newman (6–0) (4)	Carson–Newman (6–0) (4)	Carson–Newman (7–0) (4)	Carson–Newman (8–0) (4)	Carson–Newman (9–0)	Carson–Newman (9–0) (4)	1.
2.	Carson–Newman	Carson–Newman (2–0) (1)	Texas A&M–Kingsville (1–0)	Pittsburg State (2–0)	Pittsburg State (3–0)	Pittsburg State (4–0)	Pittsburg State (5–0)	Pittsburg State (6–0)	New Haven (7–1)	New Haven (8–1)	New Haven (9–1)	New Haven (9–1)	2.
3.	Texas A&M–Kingsville	Texas A&M–Kingsville (0–0)	Pittsburg State (1–0)	New Haven (4–0)	New Haven (5–0)	New Haven (5–0)	New Haven (6–0)	New Haven (6–1)	Angelo State (7–0)	Angelo State (8–0)	Angelo State (9–0)	Northwest Missouri State (11–0)	3.
4.	Ferris State	Pittsburg State (1–0) т	Catawba (2–0)	Catawba (3–0)	Catawba (4–0)	Angelo State (4–0)	Angelo State (5–0)	Angelo State (6–0)	Northwest Missouri State (8–0)	Northwest Missouri State (9–0)	Northwest Missouri State (10–0)	Texas A&M–Kingsville (9–1)	4.
5.	Pittsburg State	Clarion (0–0) т	Grand Valley State (2–0)	Angelo State (2–0)	Angelo State (3–0)	Northwest Missouri State (5–0)	Northwest Missouri State (6–0)	Northwest Missouri State (7–0)	Texas A&M–Kingsville (6–1)	Texas A&M–Kingsville (7–1)	Texas A&M–Kingsville (8–1)	Albany State (10–0)	5.
6.	West Georgia	Central Oklahoma (1–0)	Northwest Missouri State (2–0)	Northwest Missouri State (3–0)	Northwest Missouri State (4–0)	Texas A&M–Kingsville (3–1)	Texas A&M–Kingsville (4–1)	Texas A&M–Kingsville (5–1)	Albany State (7–0)	Albany State (8–0)	Albany State (9–0)	Angelo State (9–1)	6.
7.	UC Davis (Note: In the actual printed polls, UC Davis was listed as California Davis)	Catawba (2–0)	Angelo State (1–0)	Grand Valley State (3–0)	Texas A&M–Kingsville (2–1)	Albany State (5–0)	Albany State (6–0)	Albany State (6–0)	North Dakota (6–1)	North Dakota (7–1)	North Dakota (8–1)	Slippery Rock (10–1)	7.
8.	Clarion	Bloomsburg (1–0)	Albany State (2–0) т	Texas A&M–Kingsville (1–1)	Saginaw Valley State (4–0)	Grand Valley State (5–0)	Grand Valley State (6–0)	Grand Valley State (7–0)	Slippery Rock (7–1)	Slippery Rock (8–1)	Slippery Rock (9–1)	Pittsburg State (9–1)	8.
9.	Northwest Missouri State	Northwest Missouri State (1–0)	New Haven (2–0) т	Albany State (3–0)	Nebraska–Omaha (4–0)	Western State (CO) (4–1)	Western State (CO) (5–1)	West Georgia (5–1)	West Georgia (6–1)	West Georgia (7–1)	Pittsburg State (8–1)	Western State (CO) (9–2)	9.
10.	Delta State	Angelo State (1–0)	Nebraska–Omaha (2–0)	Nebraska–Omaha (3–0)	Albany State (4–0)	North Dakota (4–0)	North Dakota (5–0)	North Dakota State (6–1)	Central Oklahoma (7–1)	Pittsburg State (7–1)	Western State (CO) (8–2)	Southern Arkansas (9–1)	10.
11.	IUP (Note: In the actual printed polls, IUP was listed as Indiana, Pa)	Grand Valley State (1–0)	Western State (CO) (1–1)	Saginaw Valley State (3–0)	Western State (CO) (3–1)	West Georgia (4–1)	West Georgia (5–1)	Central Oklahoma (6–1)	Pittsburg State (6–1)	Shepherd (8–0) т	Southern Arkansas (8–1)	Northern Colorado (8–3)	11.
12.	Central Oklahoma	Albany State (1–0)	Saginaw Valley State (2–0)	Western State (CO) (2–1)	Grand Valley State (3–0)	Indianapolis (6–0)	Central Oklahoma (5–1)	Slippery Rock (6–1)	Saginaw Valley State (7–1)	Western State (CO) (6–2) т	Northern Colorado (8–2)	Ashland (9–1)	12.
13.	Nebraska–Omaha	Nebraska–Omaha (1–0)	Virginia State (3–0)	North Dakota (2–0)	North Dakota (3–0)	Central Oklahoma (4–1)	Slippery Rock (5–1)	Nebraska–Omaha (6–1)	Livingstone (9–0)	Northern Colorado (7–2)	Ashland (9–1)	North Alabama (9–2)	13.
14.	Bloomsburg	New Haven (1–0)	North Dakota (1–0)	Virginia State (3–0)	Indianapolis (5–0)	Livingstone (6–0)	Nebraska–Omaha (5–1)	Livingstone (8–0)	Truman State (6–1) т	Southern Arkansas (7–1)	North Alabama (8–2)	UC Davis (7–4)	14.
15.	Angelo State	UC Davis (0–1)	Northern Colorado (1–1)	Central Oklahoma (2–1)	Central Oklahoma (3–1)	Nebraska–Omaha (4–1)	Livingstone (7–0)	Shepherd (6–0)	Shepherd (7–0) т	Grand Valley State (8–1)	UC Davis (6–4)	Glenville State (9–2)	15.
16.	Catawba	North Dakota (0–0)	Indianapolis (3–0)	Indianapolis (4–0)	West Georgia (4–1)	Slippery Rock (4–1)	North Dakota State (5–1)	UC Davis (4–3)	UC Davis (5–3)	New Mexico Highlands (7–2)	West Georgia (7–2)	North Dakota State (9–2)	16.
17.	North Dakota	Virginia State (2–0)	Central Oklahoma (1–1)	West Georgia (3–1)	Northern Colorado (3–1)	Catawba (4–1)	Shepherd (5–0)	North Dakota (5–1)	North Alabama (6–2)	North Alabama (7–2)	Glenville State (8–2)		17.
18.	West Chester	Delta State (0–1)	West Georgia (2–1)	Northern Colorado (2–1)	Chadron State (3–1)	North Dakota State (4–1)	Virginia State (4–1)	Western State (CO) (5–2)	Western State (CO) (5–2)	Truman State (6–2)	New Mexico Highlands (7–3)		18.
19.	Chadron State	Edinboro (1–0)	Fairmont State (2–0)	Chadron State (2–1)	Livingstone (5–0)	UC Davis (3–2)	Abilene Christian (5–1)	Ashland (6–1)	Northern Colorado (6–2)	Ashland (8–1)	Nebraska–Omaha (8–2) т		19.
20.	Albany State	Chadron State (1–0)	Chadron State (1–1)	Northern Michigan (4–0)	Northern Michigan (5–0)	Shepherd (4–0)	Ashland (6–1)	Valdosta State (5–2)	Grand Valley State (7–1)	UC Davis (5–4)	Saginaw Valley State (8–2) т		20.
	Preseason	Week 1 Sept 9	Week 2 Sept 16	Week 3 Sept 23	Week 4 Sept 30	Week 5 Oct 7	Week 6 Oct 14	Week 7 Oct 21	Week 8 Oct 28	Week 9 Nov 4	Week 10 Nov 11	Week 11 Nov 18 (Note: The final poll had only 16 teams instead of 20. The 16 teams were the ones that made the Division II playoffs.)	
		Dropped: 4 Ferris State; 6 West Georgia; 11 IUP; 18 West Chester	Dropped: 5 Clarion; 8 Bloomsburg; 15 UC Davis; 18 Delta State; 19 Edinboro	Dropped: 19 Fairmont State	Dropped: 14 Virginia State	Dropped: 8 Saginaw Valley State; 17 Northern Colorado; 18 Chadron State; 20 Northern Michigan	Dropped: 12 Indianapolis; 17 Catawba; 19 UC Davis	Dropped: 18 Virginia State; 19 Abilene Christian	Dropped: 10 North Dakota State; 13 Nebraska–Omaha; 19 Ashland; 20 Valdosta State	Dropped: 10 Central Oklahoma; 12 Saginaw Valley State; 13 Livingstone	Dropped: 11 Shepherd; 15 Grand Valley State; 18 Truman State	Dropped: 7 North Dakota; 16 West Georgia; 18 New Mexico Highlands; 19 Nebraska–Omaha; 20 Saginaw Valley State	
