= Valentine Community Schools =

School district in Nebraska, United States

Valentine Community Schools (ID # 16-0006-000) is a school district headquartered in Valentine, Nebraska.

The district serves students living in an area of over 6,000 square miles (16,000 km^{2}), over four times the size of the state of Rhode Island. Most of the district is in Cherry County, where it includes the communities of Valentine, Crookston, and Wood Lake. A small portion of the district serves students living in Brown County.

== History ==
It was established in 2006 as the merger of Valentine City Schools and various rural districts, namely Ballard Marsh Public School, Boardman Creek Public School, Carver Public School, Crookston Public School, Cutcomb Lake Public School, District 45 Cherry County, District 83 Cherry County, Elsmere Public School, Evergreen Public School, Goose Creek Public School, Hart Lake Public School, Kewanee Public School, Merriman Public School, Simeon Public School, Sparks Public School, Willow Valley Public School, and Wood Lake Public School.

Jamie Isom served as superintendent until her retirement, scheduled for June 30, 2020. In 2019 the school board designated Mike Halley, previously principal of Scottsbluff Senior High School, as Isom's replacement.

== Schools ==
Valentine schools

- Valentine High School
- Valentine Middle School
- Valentine Elementary School

Rural schools

- Cutcomb Lake School - K-8 school
- Simeon School - K-8 school
