= Aquinas (disambiguation) =

Aquinas usually refers to Thomas Aquinas (1225–1274), philosopher and theologian.

Aquinas or Thomas Aquinas may also refer to:

== People ==
- Thomas Aquinas Daly (b. 1937), an American painter
- Thomas Aquinas Flannery (1918–2007), an American attorney and judge
- Thomas Aquinas Foran (1924–2000), an American attorney and prosecutor
- Thomas Aquinas Higgins (1932–2018), an American judge and jurist
- Thomas Aquinas Maguire, an American writer and illustrator
- Thomas Aquinas Muliatna Djiwandono (b. 1973), an Indonesian politician
- Thomas Aquino Manyo Maeda (b. 1949), a Japanese archbishop

== Education ==
=== Educational institutions ===
- Aquinas Academy (disambiguation), several institutions with the name
- Aquinas College (disambiguation), several colleges with the name
- Aquinas High School (disambiguation), several schools with the name
- Aquinas Diocesan Grammar School in Belfast, Northern Ireland
- Aquinas Institute, a Roman Catholic co-educational secondary school in Rochester, New York, United States
- Aquinas Institute of Theology, a Dominican seminary and graduate school of theology in St. Louis, Missouri, United States
- St. Thomas Aquinas High School (disambiguation), several schools with the name
- St. Thomas Aquinas College, a private four-year liberal arts college in Sparkill, New York, United States

=== Other uses in education ===
- Aquinas, journal published by Pontifical Lateran University in Rome, Italy
- The Aquinas, a weekly student newspaper of the University of Scranton in Scranton, Pennsylvania, United States
- Society of Saint Thomas Aquinas, a senior society at Yale University in New Haven, Connecticut, United States

== Books ==
- The Oxford Handbook of Aquinas, a book edited by Brian Davies and Eleonore Stump, published in 2012
- Thomas Aquinas Dictionary, a book of quotations edited by Morris Stockhammer, published in 1965
- Saint Thomas Aquinas (Chesterton), a book by G. K. Chesterton, published in 1933

== Sports ==
- Aquinas Football Club, an intermediate football club from Belfast, Northern Ireland, United Kingdom
- Aquinas Old Collegians Football Club, an Australian rules football club from Melbourne, Victoria, Australia

== Other uses ==
- St. Thomas Aquinas Church (disambiguation), several churches with the name
- MV St. Thomas Aquinas, a Philippines ferry that sank in 2013

== See also ==
- Aquinas Catholic Schools (disambiguation)
- Aquino (disambiguation)
