= Aquinas Catholic Schools =

Aquinas Catholic Schools may refer to:

- Aquinas Schools (Iowa)
- Aquinas Catholic Schools (Nebraska)
- St. Thomas Aquinas High School (Florida)
- Aquinas High School (New York)
- St Thomas Aquinas Catholic School, Birmingham

== See also ==
- List of institutions named after Thomas Aquinas
- Aquinas Academy (disambiguation)
- Aquinas College (disambiguation)
- Aquinas High School (disambiguation)
- St. Thomas Aquinas High School (disambiguation)
- St. Thomas Aquinas Secondary School (disambiguation)
