= St Thomas Aquinas School =

St Thomas Aquinas School may refer to:

- St. Thomas Aquinas Primary School, Bulawayo, Zimbabwe
- St. Thomas Aquinas School, Witbank, a school in South Africa

== See also ==
- St. Thomas Aquinas Secondary School (disambiguation)
- St. Thomas Aquinas High School (disambiguation)
- St Thomas School (disambiguation)
