= Akino =

Akino may refer to:

- Chrysler Akino, DaimlerChrysler car
- Akino Memorial Research

== People with given name ==
- Akino Arai (新居 昭乃; born 1959), Japanese musician
- Akino Kawamitsu (川満 愛希信; born 1989), Japanese singer from the group Bless4 and singer of theme songs for anime series

== People with surname ==
- Fuku Akino (秋野 不矩; 1908-2001), Japanese painter
- Hiroki Akino (秋野 央樹; born 1994), Japanese footballer
- Kōzō Akino (秋野 公造; born 1967), Japanese politician
- Yoko Akino (秋野 暢子; born 1957), Japanese actress
- Matsuri Akino (秋乃 茉莉), Japanese author of Pet Shop of Horrors
- Mika Akino (秋野 美佳; born 1973), Japanese professional wrestler
- Taisaku Akino (秋野 太作; born 1943), Japanese actor

== See also ==
- Aquino (disambiguation)
