= Aquinas College =

See also List of institutions named after Thomas Aquinas

Aquinas College may refer to any one of several educational institutions:

== Australia ==
- Aquinas College, Perth, Roman Catholic boys' R–12 school
- Aquinas College, Adelaide, residential college for university students in South Australia
- Aquinas College, Melbourne, Roman Catholic co-educational secondary school
- Aquinas College, Southport, Roman Catholic co-educational secondary school in Queensland
- Xavier High School, Albury, Roman Catholic co-educational secondary school formed from the amalgamation of St Joseph's College for girls and the Aquinas Boys College in 1983
- Aquinas Catholic College, Menai, Sydney, a Roman Catholic co-educational secondary school

== India ==
- Aquinas College, Edacochin, Secular Arts and Science College Under Roman Catholic Diocese Of Cochin, Affiliated To MG University Kottayam

== New Zealand ==
- Aquinas College, Otago, University of Otago Residential College
- Aquinas College, Tauranga, Roman Catholic coeducational secondary school for years 7 to 13

== Sri Lanka ==
- Aquinas College of Higher Studies, vocational university in Sri Lanka

== United Kingdom ==
- Aquinas College, Stockport, Roman Catholic college of further education

== United States ==
- Aquinas College (Massachusetts), former Roman Catholic junior college for women
- Aquinas College (Michigan), private, Roman Catholic, liberal arts college in Grand Rapids
- Aquinas College (Tennessee), private, Roman Catholic, liberal arts college in Nashville
- Thomas Aquinas College, Ventura County, California
