= Walpola (surname) =

Walpola (Sinhala: වල්පොල, romanized: Valpola) is a Sinhalese surname. Notable people with the surname include:

- Dharmadasa Walpola (1927–1983), Sri Lankan singer
- Latha Walpola (1934–2025), Sri Lankan singer
- Walpola Rahula Thera (1907–1997), Sri Lankan Buddhist monk

== See also ==
- Walpola, a village in Sri Lanka
