= Asiff Hussein =

Sri Lankan journalist (born 1972)

Asiff Hussein (born 29 February 1972) is a Sri Lankan journalist and freelance writer. He is the author of a number of publications in the fields of ethnology, sociology, and linguistics. He currently serves as Editorial Director of Sailan Muslim, a Sri Lankan website, overseeing the Finance, Culture & Heritage and Publications pages.

== Background ==
Hussein served as a Journalist at the Business Desk of The Sunday Times before joining the Sunday Observer where he served in the Business and Features Desks. He has written many articles on various topics which have been published in newspapers and on the Internet. He has also contributed to Business Today, Explore Sri Lanka, the Souvenirs of the Moors Islamic Cultural Home and Hamdard Islamicus Journal of Studies and Research in Islam. He also served as the editor of Islamic Finance Today, a magazine which promotes ethical interest-free banking and finance.

Hussein holds a B.A. Degree in Social Sciences from the Open University of Sri Lanka, a Post-graduate Diploma in Archaeology from the University of Kelaniya and a Diploma in Journalism from the Aquinas College of Higher Studies, Sri Lanka. He is also among the Sri Lankan Alumni of the International Visitor Leadership Programme organised by the US State Department, having participated in an IVLP Programme on Religion and Social Justice in America on a tour that covered Washington, Huntsville, Birmingham, Santa Fe and San Francisco from 28 June to 16 July 2010.

== Publications ==
Hussein is the author of a number of publications including The Lion and the Sword. An Ethnological Study of Sri Lanka. Vols.1 and 2 (2001/2008); The Origins of the Sinhala Language'. A Lexical Reconstruction of Sinhala Vocables to their Earliest Known Proto-Indo-European Forms (2002); Sarandib. An Ethnological Study of the Muslims of Sri Lanka (Feb & July 2007 and September 2011) Ivilly Pevilly. The Gastronome’s Guide to the Culinary History & Heritage of Sri Lanka (2012), Tolerance in Islam (2012) and Caste in Sri Lanka. From Ancient Times to the Present Day (2013) and Zeylanica, a Study of the Peoples and Languages of Sri Lanka (2009). He has also co-authored Memons of Sri Lanka. Men, Memoirs, Milestones with Hameed Kareem (2006) and co-edited The Muslim Heritage of Eastern Sri Lanka with S.H.M. Jameel (2011).

Hussein's book Sarandib, an Ethnological Study of the Muslims of Sri Lanka is a study of Sri Lankan Muslim society. In 2013 it was in its third expanded edition. It is a collection of scholarly and anecdotal information about the society and culture of the country’s major Muslim groups, the Moors, Malays, Memons and Muslims of Indian origin who though of different ethnic origins, share the common faith of Islam. The work is contains detailed information on aspects like ethnic origins, language, settlements, customs and traditions, dress and ornamentation, culinary fare, medical remedies, names and titles, occupations, social organization, ceremonial observances and religious and folk beliefs.

== Controversy ==
Hussein has written in support of what the World Health Organization classifies as Type Ia Female Genital Mutilation (FGM). In an article entitled "Female Circumcision: The Hidden Truth" he defended amputation of the clitoral prepuce as "an Islamic practice that brings untold benefits to women," while criticising more extreme forms of FGM such as clitoridectomy and infibulation.

In May 2016 a page on social media site Facebook promoting Hussein's article was deleted by Facebook after multiple complaints from Facebook users. In July 2017 the same article was republished on a Canadian web site called "Muslims in Calgary." In September 2017 the Muslim Council of Calgary, which says it represents 80,000 Muslims in Calgary, issued statements disavowing any connection to the web site, and condemning "anti-Semitic sentiments" in Hussein's article.
