= List of Stockport County F.C. managers =

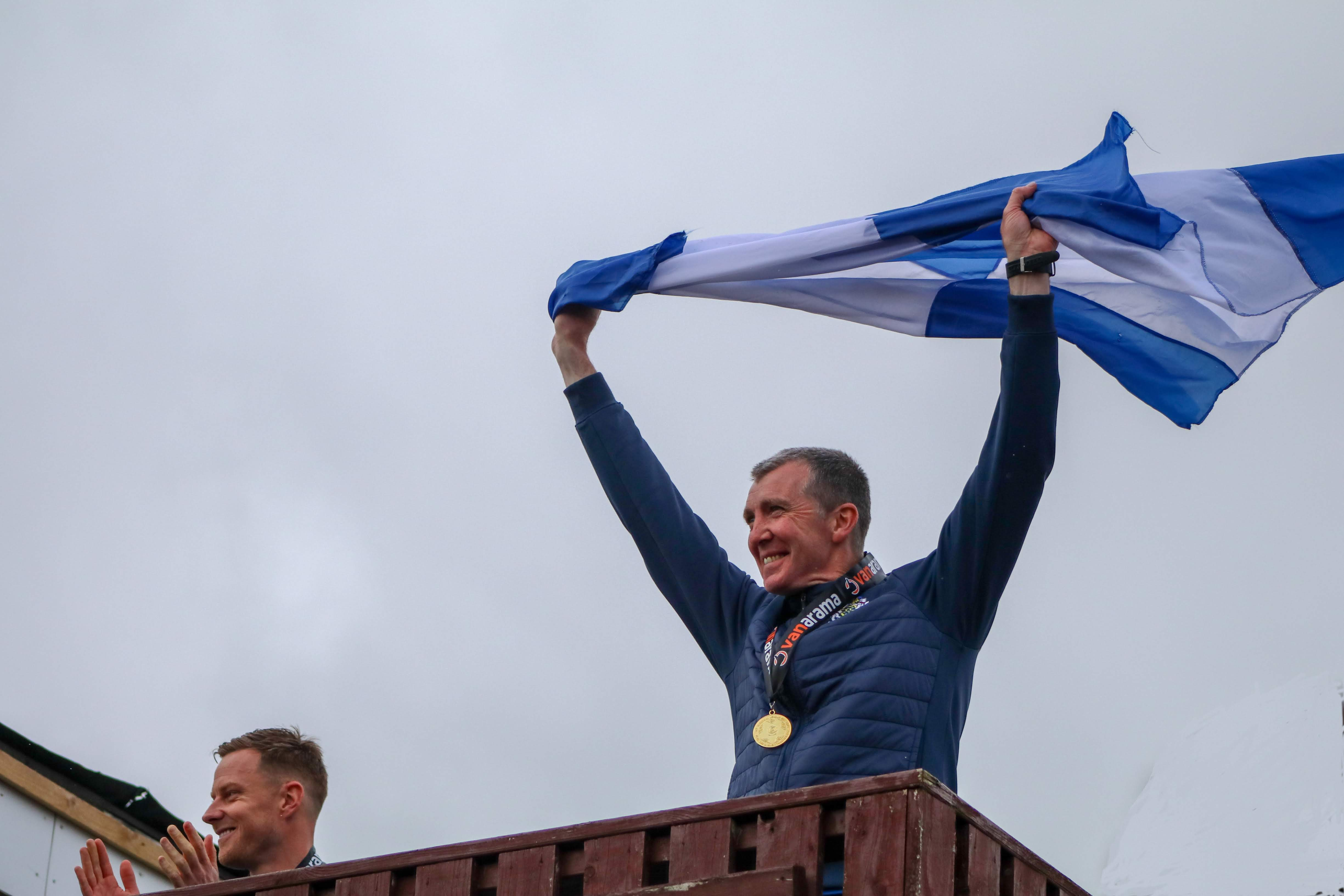
Jim Gannon celebrating winning the National League North as Stockport County manager in April 2019. Gannon had three spells managing Stockport.

Stockport County F.C. is an English professional association football club based in the town of Stockport. Founded in 1883 as Heaton Norris Rovers the clubs first manager was Fred Stewart who would manage Stockport for over 16 years making him the longest-serving manager in the clubs history.

The club has had 51 permanent managers. The first foreign manager of the club was the German, Bert Trautmann who was appointed in 1965.

The club's current manager is Jimmy McNulty, who took over from Dave Challinor in June 2026.

== List of managers ==
Information correct after match played on 15 July 2024. Only competitive matches are counted, except the abandoned 1939–40 Football League season and matches in Wartime Leagues and Cups.

Key

- Names of caretaker managers are supplied where known, and the names of caretaker managers are highlighted in italics and marked with an asterisk (*).
- Names of player-managers are supplied where known, and are marked with a double-dagger (‡).

Name	Nationality	From	To	Matches	Won	Drawn (Note: Drawn matches decided by penalty shoot-outs are counted as draws.)	Lost	Win% (Note: Win% is rounded to two decimal places.)	Honours	Refs.
Fred Stewart	England	1 August 1894	31 May 1911	373	111	76	186	29.76	Lancashire League winners: 1899–1900; Lancashire Combination winners: 1904–05	
Harry Lewis		1 June 1911	1 April 1914	110	29	30	51	26.36		
David Ashworth	England	1 April 1914	1 December 1919	61	25	12	24	40.98		
Albert Williams		1 December 1919	1 November 1924	204	70	51	83	34.31	Third Division North champions: 1921-22	
Fred Scotchbrook	England	1 November 1924	1 February 1926	60	17	13	30	28.33		
Lincoln Hyde		1 April 1926	1 April 1931	221	128	35	58	57.92		
Andrew Wilson	Scotland	1 July 1932	1 May 1933	43	21	12	10	48.84		
Fred Westgarth	England	1 May 1934	1 September 1936	95	46	16	33	48.42		
Bob Kelly	England	1 November 1936	1 January 1938	52	24	16	12	46.15	Third Division North champions: 1936-37	
George Hunt		1 January 1939	1 March 1939	10	4	2	4	40.00		
Bob Marshall	England	1 March 1939	28 February 1949	141	60	28	53	42.55		
Andy Beattie	Scotland	1 March 1949	1 April 1952	150	71	28	51	47.33		
Dick Duckworth	England	1 October 1952	31 May 1956	181	74	42	65	40.88	Cheshire Bowl winners: 1952–53, 1955–56	
Billy Moir ‡	Scotland	1 June 1956	1 July 1960	196	79	42	75	40.31		
Reg Flewin	England	1 October 1960	1 September 1963	137	47	27	63	34.31		
Trevor Porteous ‡	England	1 September 1963	1 October 1965	107	31	21	55	28.97		
Bert Trautmann	Germany	1 October 1965	1 April 1966	29	12	5	12	41.38		
Eddie Quigley	England	1 April 1966	1 October 1966	65	28	8	29	43.08		
Jimmy Meadows	England	1 October 1966	1 April 1969	135	56	38	41	41.48	Fourth Division winners: 1966-67	
Walter Galbraith	Scotland	1 August 1969	1 April 1970	46	6	12	28	13.04		
Matt Woods	England	1 April 1970	1 December 1971	71	22	17	32	30.99		
Brian Doyle	England	1 March 1972	1 May 1974	122	35	40	47	28.69		
Jimmy Meadows	England	1 May 1974	5 August 1975	49	12	15	22	24.49		
Eddie Hopkinson*	England	5 August 1975	31 May 1975	3	1	1	1	33.33		
Roy Chapman	England	31 August 1975	1 May 1976	46	12	11	23	26.09		
Eddie Quigley	England	1 May 1976	21 April 1977	47	15	17	15	31.91		
Alan Thompson ‡	England	1 March 1978	17 October 1979	40	14	14	12	35.00		
Mike Summerbee ‡	England	1 March 1978	17 October 1979	130	40	29	61	30.77		
Jimmy McGuigan	Scotland	13 November 1979	23 April 1982	130	40	29	61	30.77		
Eric Webster	England	23 April 1982	1 May 1985	152	48	37	67	31.58		
Colin Murphy	England	8 August 1985	24 October 1985	15	3	5	7	20.00		
Les Chapman ‡	England	1 October 1985	1 July 1986	39	14	11	14	35.90		
Jimmy Melia	England	9 July 1986	1 November 1986	18	2	4	12	11.11		
Colin Murphy	England	1 November 1986	26 May 1987	34	12	9	13	35.29		
Asa Hartford ‡	Scotland	12 June 1987	1 April 1989	93	24	34	35	25.81		
Danny Bergara	Uruguay	1 April 1989	31 March 1995	319	137	83	99	42.95	Fourth Division runners-up/promoted: 1990-91; Third Division Playoff Finalists: 1991-92; Second Division Playoff Finalists: 1993-94; Football League Trophy runner-up:1991-92, 1992-93	
Dave Jones	England	31 March 1995	23 June 1997	117	57	32	28	48.72	Second Division runners-up/promoted: 1996-97	
Gary Megson	England	1 July 1997	25 June 1999	102	35	27	40	34.31		
Andy Kilner	England	28 June 1999	29 October 2001	119	29	42	48	24.37		
Craig Madden*	England	29 October 2001	6 November 2001	2	0	0	2	0.00		
Carlton Palmer ‡	England	6 November 2001	18 September 2003	92	25	17	50	27.17		
John Hollins*	England	18 September 2003	16 October 2003	7	2	2	3	28.57		
Sammy McIlroy	Northern Ireland	16 October 2003	25 November 2004	58	14	18	26	24.14		
Mark Lillis*	England	25 November 2004	18 December 2004	6	1	1	4	16.67		
Chris Turner	England	19 December 2004	26 December 2005	51	7	15	29	13.73		
Jim Gannon*	Ireland	26 December 2005	17 January 2006	5	2	2	1	40.00		
Jim Gannon	Ireland	17 January 2006	6 May 2009	182	79	42	61	43.41	League Two play-off winners: 2007–08	
Gary Ablett	England	9 July 2009	17 June 2010	51	7	10	34	13.73		
Paul Simpson	England	12 July 2010	4 January 2011	27	5	10	12	18.52		
Peter Ward	England	4 January 2011	9 March 2011	13	2	2	9	15.38		
Ray Mathias	England	9 March 2011	1 July 2011	10	2	4	4	20.00		
Dietmar Hamann	Germany	5 July 2011	7 November 2011	20	3	10	7	15.00		
Jim Gannon	Ireland	14 November 2011	16 January 2013	233	112	62	59	48.07		
Darije Kalezić	Netherlands Bosnia and Herzegovina	24 January 2013	20 March 2013	12	3	2	7	25.00		
Ian Bogie	England	31 March 2013	15 October 2013	16	4	4	8	25.00		
Alan Lord	England	16 October 2013	17 May 2015	80	27	22	31	33.75		
Neil Young	England	17 May 2015	13 January 2016	26	8	8	10	30.77		
Jim Gannon	Ireland	18 January 2016	21 January 2021	266	136	64	66	51.13	National League North champions: 2018-19; Cheshire Senior Cup winners: 2015-16	
Dave Conlon*	England	21 January 2021	27 January 2021	1	0	1	0	0.00		
Simon Rusk	Scotland	27 January 2021	27 October 2021	42	21	12	9	50.00		
Dave Conlon*	England	27 October 2021	2 November 2021	1	1	0	0	100.00		
Dave Challinor	England	2 November 2021	1 June 2026	204	113	45	46	55.39	National League Champions: 2021-22; Cheshire Senior Cup winners: 2021-22; League Two play-off finalist: 2022-23; League Two Champions: 2023-24	
Jimmy McNulty	England	5 June 2026	present	0	0	0	0	—		
