= Thomas High School =

Thomas High School may refer to:

- Fort Thomas High School, Fort Thomas, Arizona
- Norman Thomas High School, New York City
- Thomas High School (West Virginia), a former school in Tucker County Schools, West Virginia
- Thomas High School (Oklahoma), Thomas, Oklahoma
- Webster Thomas High School, Webster, New York

== See also ==
- St. Thomas High School (disambiguation)
