= Dale Nichols =

American painter

Dale William Nichols
- Born: July 13, 1904; David City, Nebraska
- Died: October 19, 1995 (aged 91); Sedona, Arizona
- Education: Chicago Academy of Fine Arts
- Occupation: Artist

Dale Nichols (July 13, 1904 – October 19, 1995), also published under his full name, Dale William Nichols, was an American visual artist whose works included illustrations, paintings, lithographs, and wood carvings. He is best known for his work as a rural landscape painter. Nichols' work is often classified with that of other regional American landscape artists, including Grant Wood and Thomas Hart Benton.

== Life ==
Dale William Nichols was born on July 13, 1904, in the small town of David City, Nebraska. He began his career as an artist while studying at Chicago Academy of Fine Arts and spent the greater part of the 1920s and 1930s in Chicago, later becoming the Carnegie Professor in Art at the University of Illinois. He then took a position in 1943 as the art editor of the Encyclopædia Britannica. Upon leaving his post at Britannica, he spent the remainder of his life traveling, splitting the majority of his time between Arizona, Louisiana, Mississippi, Alaska and Guatemala.

In September 1939, Nichols was featured in Time magazine. One reviewer wrote: "Subjects he prefers are the prairie landscapes of his youth, usually snowed under. These famed smooth snow effects Artist Nichols gets by laying on his oils in a thin film with watercolor brushes."

== Death and legacy ==
Nichols died in Sedona, Arizona, on October 19, 1995, at age 91.

His art was published on postcards sold by the United States Postal Service in 1995. Three of Nichols' paintings are now listed in the collection of the Smithsonian American Art Museum. The Museum of Nebraska Art features four of his large oil paintings, along with four lithographs and four sketches.
