= St. Thomas High School =

St. Thomas High School or Saint Thomas High School may refer to:

- St. Thomas High School (Houston, Texas)
- St. Thomas High School (Quebec)
- St. Thomas High School (Braddock, Pennsylvania)
- St. Thomas' High School, Jhelum
- St. Thomas High School, Honnavar

== See also ==
- Saint Thomas Academy, Mendota Heights, Minnesota
- St. Thomas Aquinas High School (disambiguation)
- St. Thomas More High School
- Thomas High School (disambiguation)
