= List of institutions named after Thomas Aquinas =

Institutions of learning named after Thomas Aquinas include the following:

Africa
| Name of Institution | Location |
|---|---|
| St. Thomas Aquinas Secondary School | Accra, Ghana |
| Aquinas High School | Nairobi, Kenya |
| St. Thomas Aquinas College | Akure, Nigeria |
Asia
| Name of Institution | Location |
| University of Santo Tomas–Legazpi | Legazpi City, Philippines |
| Pontifical and Royal University of Santo Tomas, The Catholic University of the Philippines | Manila, Philippines |
| Aquinas School | San Juan, Metro Manila, Philippines |
| Saint Thomas Aquinas College | Sogod, Southern Leyte, Philippines |
| Aquinas College of Higher Studies | Borella, Sri Lanka |
Australasia
| Name of Institution | Location |
| Aquinas College, Adelaide | Adelaide, Australia |
| Aquinas College, Melbourne | Melbourne, Australia |
| St. Thomas Aquinas College Tynong | Victoria, Australia |
| St. Thomas Aquinas Primary School Springwood | New South Wales, Australia |
| Aquinas College, Perth | Perth, Western Australia |
| Aquinas College on the Gold Coast | Gold Coast, Queensland, Australia |
| Aquinas College, Sydney | Sydney, Australia |
| Aquinas College (hall of residence at The University of Otago) | Dunedin, New Zealand |
| Aquinas College, Tauranga | Tauranga, New Zealand |
Europe
| Name of Institution | Location |
| Colégio de São Tomás | Lisbon, Portugal |
| St. Thomas Aquinas Catholic School | Kings Norton, Birmingham, England |
| St. Thomas Aquinas RC High School (Loreto High School) | Chorlton, Manchester, England |
| Aquinas College, Stockport | Stockport, England |
| Thomas-Institut, University of Cologne | Cologne, Germany |
| The College of St. Thomas Aquinas | Newbridge, County Kildare, Ireland |
| Pontifical University of St. Thomas Aquinas (Angelicum) | Rome, Italy |
| Aquinas Diocesan Grammar School | Belfast, Northern Ireland |
| Saint Thomas of Aquinas RC High School | Edinburgh, Scotland |
| Saint Thomas Aquinas Roman Catholic Secondary School | Glasgow, Scotland |
| Superior Institute of Religious Sciences of St. Thomas Aquinas | Kyiv, Ukraine |
North America
| Name of Institution | Location |
| St. Thomas Aquinas High School | Kenora, Ontario |
| St. Thomas Aquinas High School | Spruce Grove, Alberta |
| Aquinas High School | San Bernardino, California |
| Thomas Aquinas College | Santa Paula, California & Northfield, Massachusetts |
| St. Thomas Aquinas School | Fairfield, Connecticut |
| St. Thomas Aquinas High School | Fort Lauderdale, Florida |
| St. Thomas Aquinas Church and School | Indianapolis, Indiana |
| Thomas International | South Bend, Indiana |
| Saint Thomas Aquinas High School | Overland Park, Kansas |
| Aquinas College | Grand Rapids, Michigan |
| St. Thomas Aquinas Catholic School | Saginaw, Michigan |
| Saint Thomas Academy | Mendota Heights, Minnesota |
| University of St. Thomas | Saint Paul, Minnesota |
| St. Thomas Aquinas Preparatory Seminary (now defunct) | Hannibal, Missouri |
| St. Thomas College (Now University of Scranton) | Scranton, Pennsylvania |
| Aquinas Institute of Theology | St. Louis, Missouri |
| St. Thomas University | Fredericton, New Brunswick |
| St. Thomas Aquinas High School | Dover, New Hampshire |
| Saint Thomas Aquinas Academy (1887–2005) | Brooklyn, New York |
| The Aquinas Institute of Rochester | Rochester, New York |
| St. Thomas Aquinas College | Sparkill, New York |
| St. Thomas Aquinas High School | Louisville, Ohio |
| St. Thomas Aquinas Secondary School | Brampton, Ontario |
| St. Thomas Aquinas Catholic Secondary School | London, Ontario |
| St. Thomas Aquinas Catholic Secondary School | Oakville, Ontario |
| Aquinas College | Nashville, Tennessee |
| St. Thomas Aquinas Catholic Church | College Station, Texas |
| St. Thomas Aquinas Catholic School | Dallas, Texas |
| St. Thomas High School | Houston, Texas |
| The University of St. Thomas | Houston, Texas |
| St. Thomas Aquinas Catholic School | Woodbridge, Virginia |
| Aquinas High School | La Crosse, Wisconsin |
| St. Thomas Aquinas Church and Catholic Student Center at Iowa State University | Ames, Iowa |
| Aquinas High School | Augusta, Georgia |
South America
| Name of Institution | Location |
| Colegio Santo Tomás de Aquino | Bogotá, Colombia |
| The University of Santo Tomas | Bogotá, Colombia |
| Colegio Santo Tomás de Aquino | Caracas, Venezuela |
| Colegio Santo Tomás de Aquino | Lima, Peru |
