= David City, Nebraska =

- City
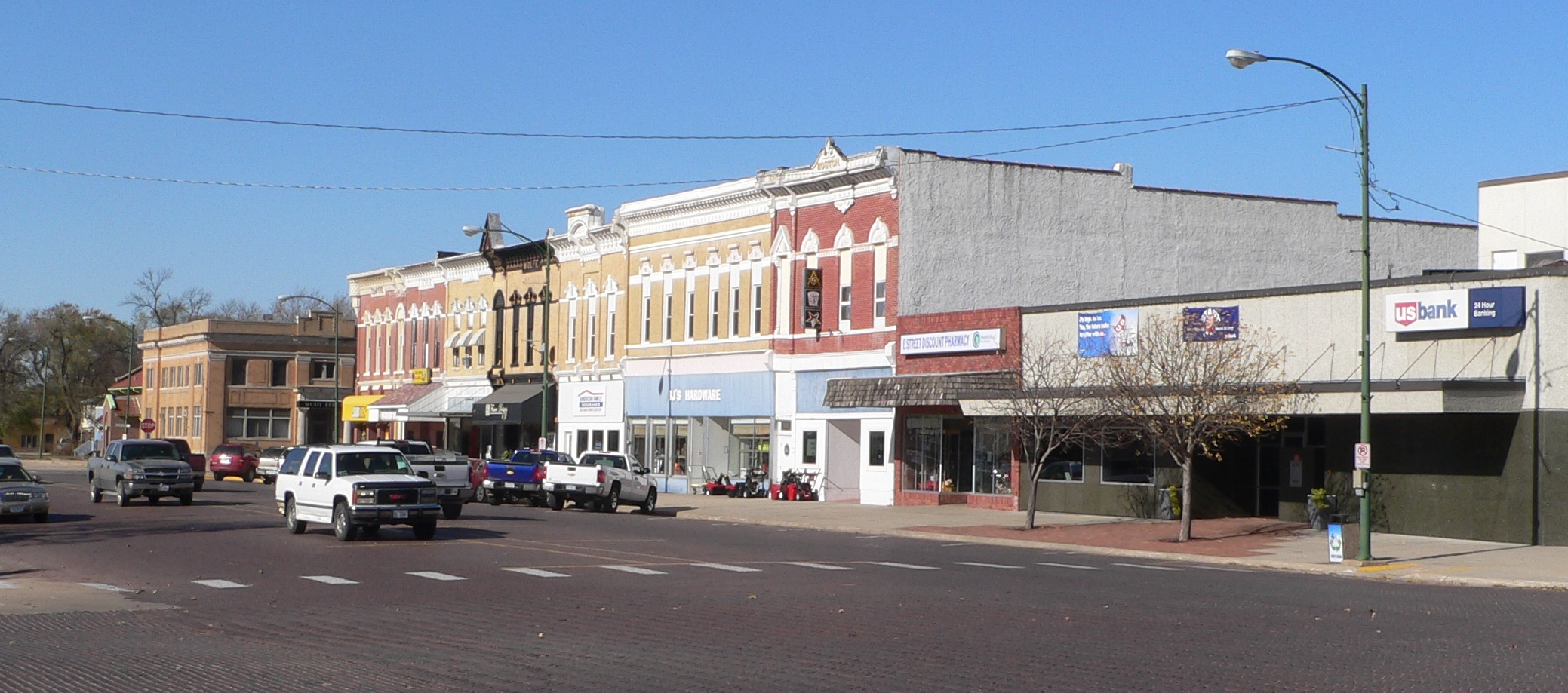
- Downtown David City: E Street

- Location of David City, Nebraska

- Location within Nebraska Location within the United States
- Coordinates: 41°15′16″N 97°07′35″W
- Country: United States
- State: Nebraska
- County: Butler
- Township: Franklin
- Founded: 1873
- Named for: Possibly David Butler or Phoebe Davids Miles

Area
  - Total: 2.03 sq mi (5.27 km^{2})
  - Land: 2.02 sq mi (5.22 km^{2})
  - Water: 0.019 sq mi (0.05 km^{2})
- Elevation: 1,624 ft (495 m)

Population (2020)
  - Total: 2,995
  - Density: 1,486.2/sq mi (573.83/km^{2})
- Time zone: UTC-6 (Central (CST))
  - Summer (DST): UTC-5 (CDT)
- ZIP code: 68632
- Area code: 402
- FIPS code: 31-12315
- GNIS feature ID: 837956
- Website: davidcityne.com

David City is a city in and the county seat of Butler County, Nebraska, United States. The population was 2,995 at the 2020 census. David City was founded in 1873 to serve as the county seat when county residents desired a more centrally located county seat than Savannah.

== Name ==
The origin of the name of David City is disputed. One source claims that David City was named after the first Governor of Nebraska, David Butler. Another source says that David City was named in honor of Phoebe Miles, whose maiden name was either "David" or "Davids," because she had deeded a large tract of land for the townsite on which the courthouse now sits. A third source indicates that David City may have been named for a "Mr. Davids," a relative of William Miles, who was part owner of the townsite, and that the "s" at the end of "Davids" was dropped for convenience. Because details are unclear, this third explanation may be just another version of the second explanation. On its official website, David City claims the second of these explanations as the official explanation of its name.

== Geography ==
According to the United States Census Bureau, the city has a total area of 2.07 square miles (5.36 km^{2}), of which 2.06 square miles (5.34 km^{2}) is land and 0.01 square miles (0.03 km^{2}) is water.

=== Climate ===
Climate data for David City 4E, Nebraska (1991–2020 normals, extremes 1897–present)
Month	Jan	Feb	Mar	Apr	May	Jun	Jul	Aug	Sep	Oct	Nov	Dec	Year
Record high °F (°C)	71 (22)	79 (26)	89 (32)	96 (36)	105 (41)	106 (41)	114 (46)	111 (44)	104 (40)	96 (36)	85 (29)	76 (24)	114 (46)
Mean daily maximum °F (°C)	31.1 (−0.5)	36.1 (2.3)	49.0 (9.4)	61.1 (16.2)	71.9 (22.2)	81.8 (27.7)	85.9 (29.9)	83.8 (28.8)	77.2 (25.1)	63.7 (17.6)	48.0 (8.9)	34.8 (1.6)	60.4 (15.8)
Daily mean °F (°C)	21.4 (−5.9)	25.7 (−3.5)	37.4 (3.0)	48.7 (9.3)	60.4 (15.8)	70.7 (21.5)	75.0 (23.9)	72.7 (22.6)	64.9 (18.3)	51.6 (10.9)	37.1 (2.8)	25.4 (−3.7)	49.2 (9.6)
Mean daily minimum °F (°C)	11.7 (−11.3)	15.3 (−9.3)	25.7 (−3.5)	36.4 (2.4)	48.9 (9.4)	59.6 (15.3)	64.0 (17.8)	61.7 (16.5)	52.6 (11.4)	39.5 (4.2)	26.2 (−3.2)	16.0 (−8.9)	38.1 (3.4)
Record low °F (°C)	−30 (−34)	−30 (−34)	−17 (−27)	5 (−15)	22 (−6)	33 (1)	43 (6)	35 (2)	18 (−8)	5 (−15)	−13 (−25)	−27 (−33)	−30 (−34)
Average precipitation inches (mm)	0.78 (20)	0.90 (23)	1.72 (44)	3.02 (77)	4.53 (115)	4.88 (124)	3.09 (78)	4.00 (102)	2.79 (71)	2.16 (55)	1.35 (34)	1.15 (29)	30.37 (771)
Average snowfall inches (cm)	8.0 (20)	7.4 (19)	5.1 (13)	1.9 (4.8)	0.0 (0.0)	0.0 (0.0)	0.0 (0.0)	0.0 (0.0)	0.0 (0.0)	0.9 (2.3)	2.4 (6.1)	6.1 (15)	31.8 (81)
Average precipitation days (≥ 0.01 in)	5.6	6.0	7.7	9.7	12.0	11.1	9.1	9.6	7.8	7.0	5.1	5.9	96.6
Average snowy days (≥ 0.1 in)	4.4	4.3	2.9	0.8	0.0	0.0	0.0	0.0	0.0	0.4	2.0	4.2	19.0
Source: NOAA

== Demographics ==
Historical population
Census	Pop.	Note	%±
1880	1,000		—
1890	2,028		102.8%
1900	1,845		−9.0%
1910	2,177		18.0%
1920	2,216		1.8%
1930	2,333		5.3%
1940	2,272		−2.6%
1950	2,321		2.2%
1960	2,304		−0.7%
1970	2,380		3.3%
1980	2,514		5.6%
1990	2,522		0.3%
2000	2,597		3.0%
2010	2,906		11.9%
2020	2,995		3.1%
U.S. Decennial Census; 2012 Estimate

=== 2020 census ===
As of the 2020 census, David City had a population of 2,995. The median age was 38.6 years. 25.6% of residents were under the age of 18 and 21.1% of residents were 65 years of age or older. For every 100 females there were 92.4 males, and for every 100 females age 18 and over there were 88.3 males age 18 and over.

0.0% of residents lived in urban areas, while 100.0% lived in rural areas.

There were 1,189 households in David City, of which 30.8% had children under the age of 18 living in them. Of all households, 46.3% were married-couple households, 17.7% were households with a male householder and no spouse or partner present, and 29.3% were households with a female householder and no spouse or partner present. About 34.2% of all households were made up of individuals and 16.6% had someone living alone who was 65 years of age or older.

There were 1,290 housing units, of which 7.8% were vacant. The homeowner vacancy rate was 2.6% and the rental vacancy rate was 4.0%.

Racial composition as of the 2020 census
Race	Number	Percent
White	2,674	89.3%
Black or African American	9	0.3%
American Indian and Alaska Native	13	0.4%
Asian	5	0.2%
Native Hawaiian and Other Pacific Islander	0	0.0%
Some other race	174	5.8%
Two or more races	120	4.0%
Hispanic or Latino (of any race)	261	8.7%

=== 2010 census ===
As of the census of 2010, there were 2,906 people, 1,153 households, and 706 families living in the city. The population density was 1,410.7 inhabitants per square mile (544.7/km^{2}). There were 1,274 housing units at an average density of 618.4 per square mile (238.8/km^{2}). The racial makeup of the city was 96.1% White, 0.6% African American, 0.1% Native American, 0.7% Asian, 1.8% from other races, and 0.8% from two or more races. Hispanic or Latino of any race were 3.5% of the population.

There were 1,153 households, of which 30.6% had children under the age of 18 living with them, 47.0% were married couples living together, 10.5% had a female householder with no husband present, 3.7% had a male householder with no wife present, and 38.8% were non-families. 33.4% of all households were made up of individuals, and 18.1% had someone living alone who was 65 years of age or older. The average household size was 2.37 and the average family size was 3.05.

The median age in the city was 42.1 years. 25.9% of residents were under the age of 18; 6.4% were between the ages of 18 and 24; 21.2% were from 25 to 44; 24.8% were from 45 to 64; and 21.7% were 65 years of age or older. The gender makeup of the city was 47.5% male and 52.5% female.

=== 2000 census ===
As of the census of 2000, there were 2,597 people, 1,082 households, and 641 families living in the city. The population density was 1,724.6 inhabitants per square mile (665.9/km^{2}). There were 1,203 housing units at an average density of 798.9 per square mile (308.5/km^{2}). The racial makeup of the city was 98.58% White, 0.15% African American, 0.15% Native American, 0.23% Asian, 0.12% Pacific Islander, 0.50% from other races, and 0.27% from two or more races. Hispanic or Latino of any race were 1.00% of the population.

There were 1,082 households, out of which 29.6% had children under the age of 18 living with them, 49.0% were married couples living together, 7.1% had a female householder with no husband present, and 40.7% were non-families. 37.2% of all households were made up of individuals, and 22.6% had someone living alone who was 65 years of age or older. The average household size was 2.31 and the average family size was 3.06.

The median age was 41 years. The age distribution was: 26.2% under the age of 18, 5.7% aged from 18 to 24, 23.2% from 25 to 44, 20.4% from 45 to 64, and 24.5% aged 65 years or older. For every 100 females, there were 91.5 males. For every 100 females age 18 and over, there were 85.8 males.

As of 2000 the median income for a household in the city was $34,583, and the median income for a family was $48,098. Males had a median income of $28,185 versus $21,179 for females. The per capita income for the city was $16,550. About 3.1% of families and 8.1% of the population were below the poverty line, including 8.0% of those under age 18 and 10.1% of those age 65 or over.

== Education ==
=== High schools ===
David City has two high schools. The largest is David City Secondary School. Its athletic teams are the Scouts. The second is Aquinas High School, a Catholic school is named after Thomas Aquinas. Its teams are the Monarchs.

=== David City Public Schools ===
David City Public Schools operates a secondary school and two elementary schools: Bellwood and David City.

== Media ==
David City has one newspaper, The Banner-Press. The newspaper is published once a week.

== Notable people ==
- Mike Ekeler – College football coach, Nebraska special teams coordinator
- Ruth Etting – Popular singer of the 1920s and 1930s, subject of the 1955 film Love Me or Leave Me
- Joyce Hall – Founder of Hallmark Cards
- Shon Hopwood – Bank robber turned lawyer and law professor
- Frederick N. Howser – 22nd Attorney General of California
- Roman Hruska – Republican U.S. Senator, 1954–1976
- John Kirby – Professional football player
- Bob Martin – Football player
- Dale Nichols – Artist
- Hugo Otopalik – Iowa State wrestling and golf coach
- Kenneth Steiner – Roman Catholic bishop

== Gallery ==
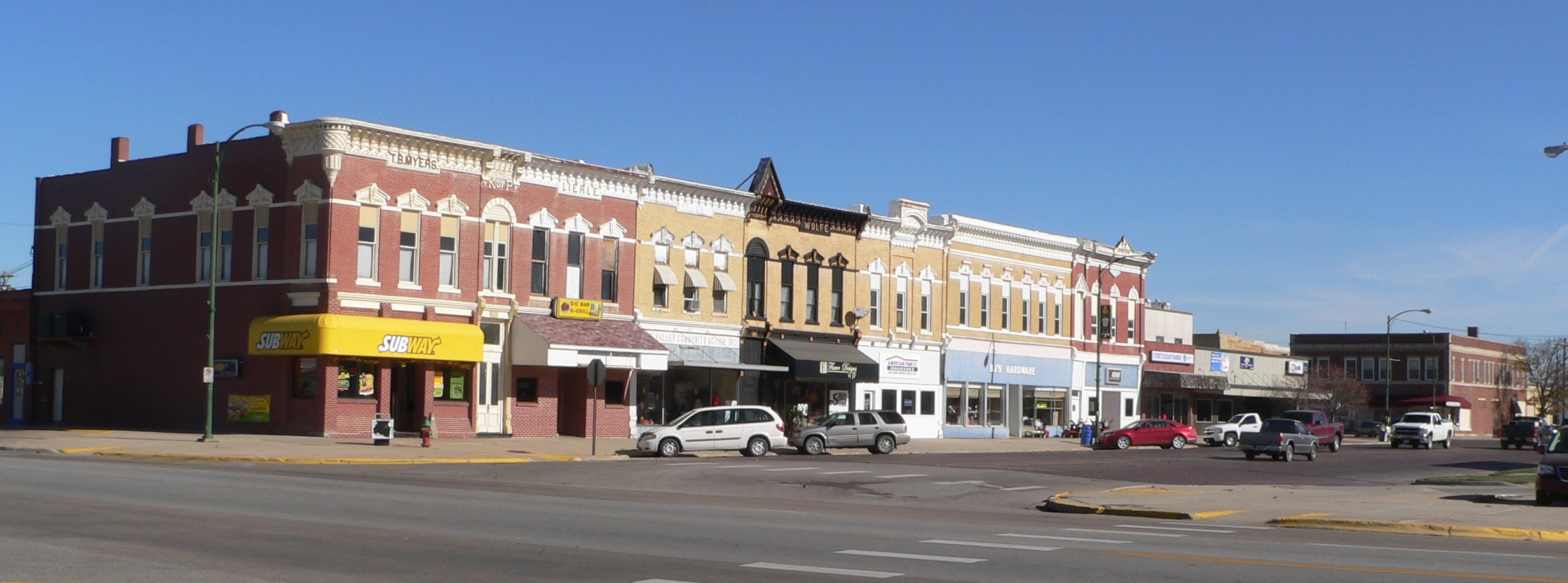
Street scene

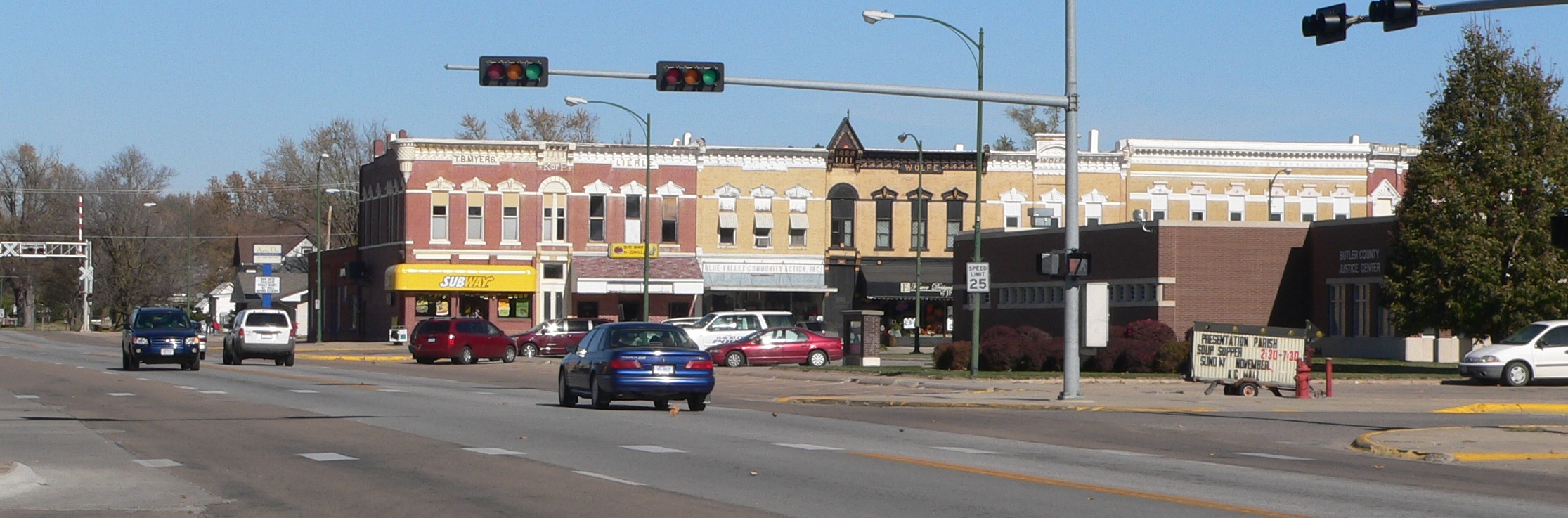
Street scene

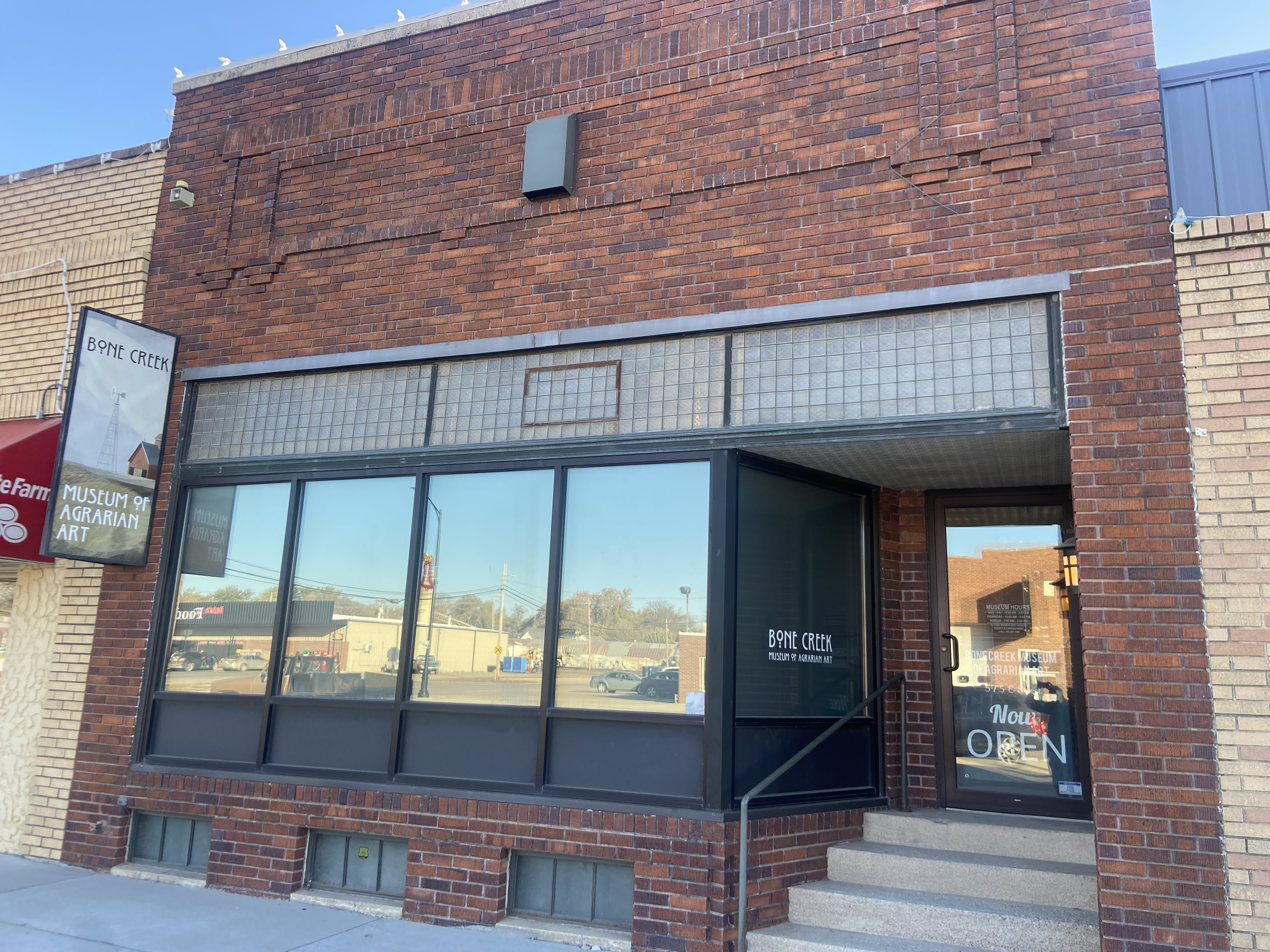
Bone Creek Museum of Agrarian Art

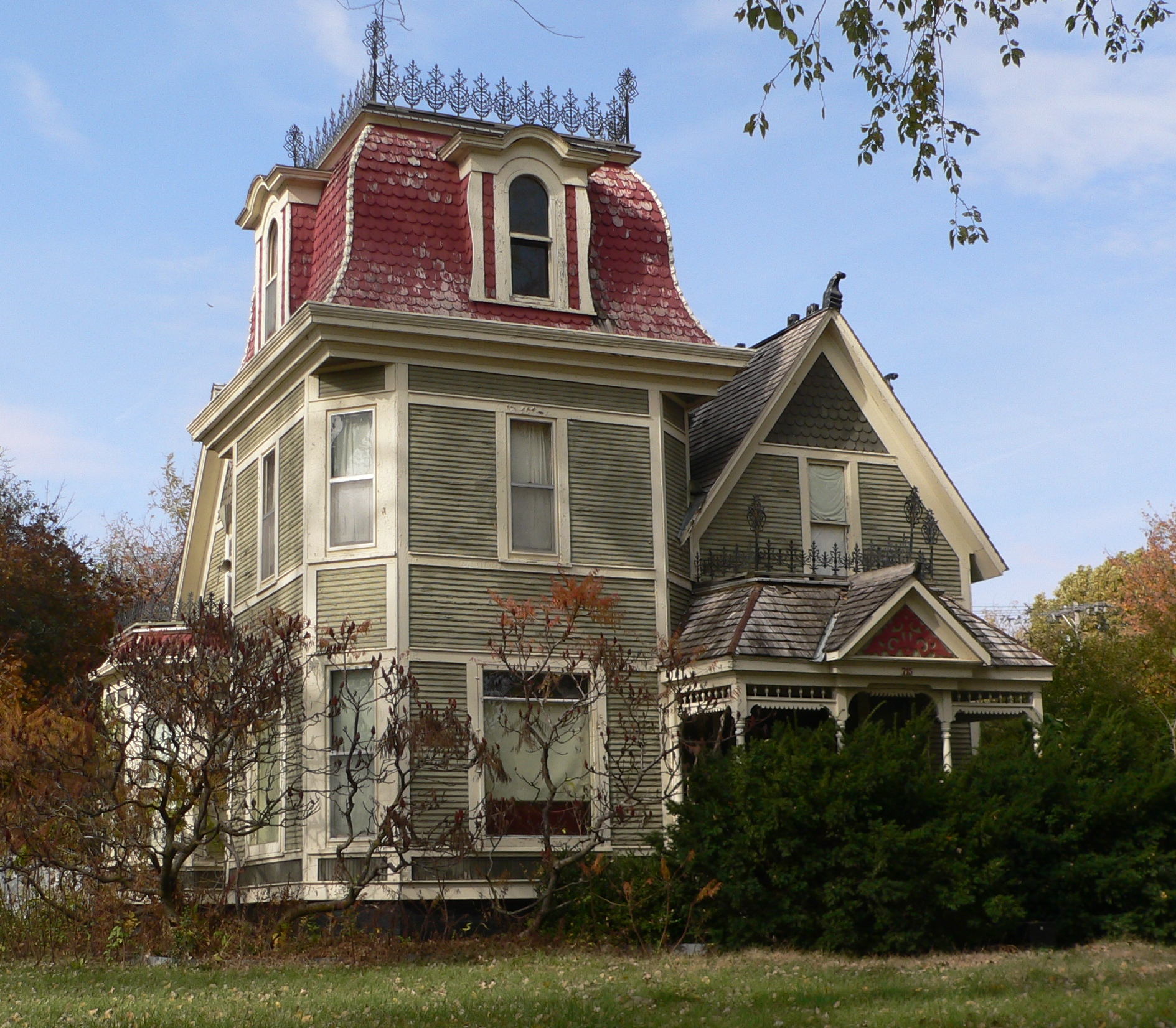
Chauncey S. Taylor House

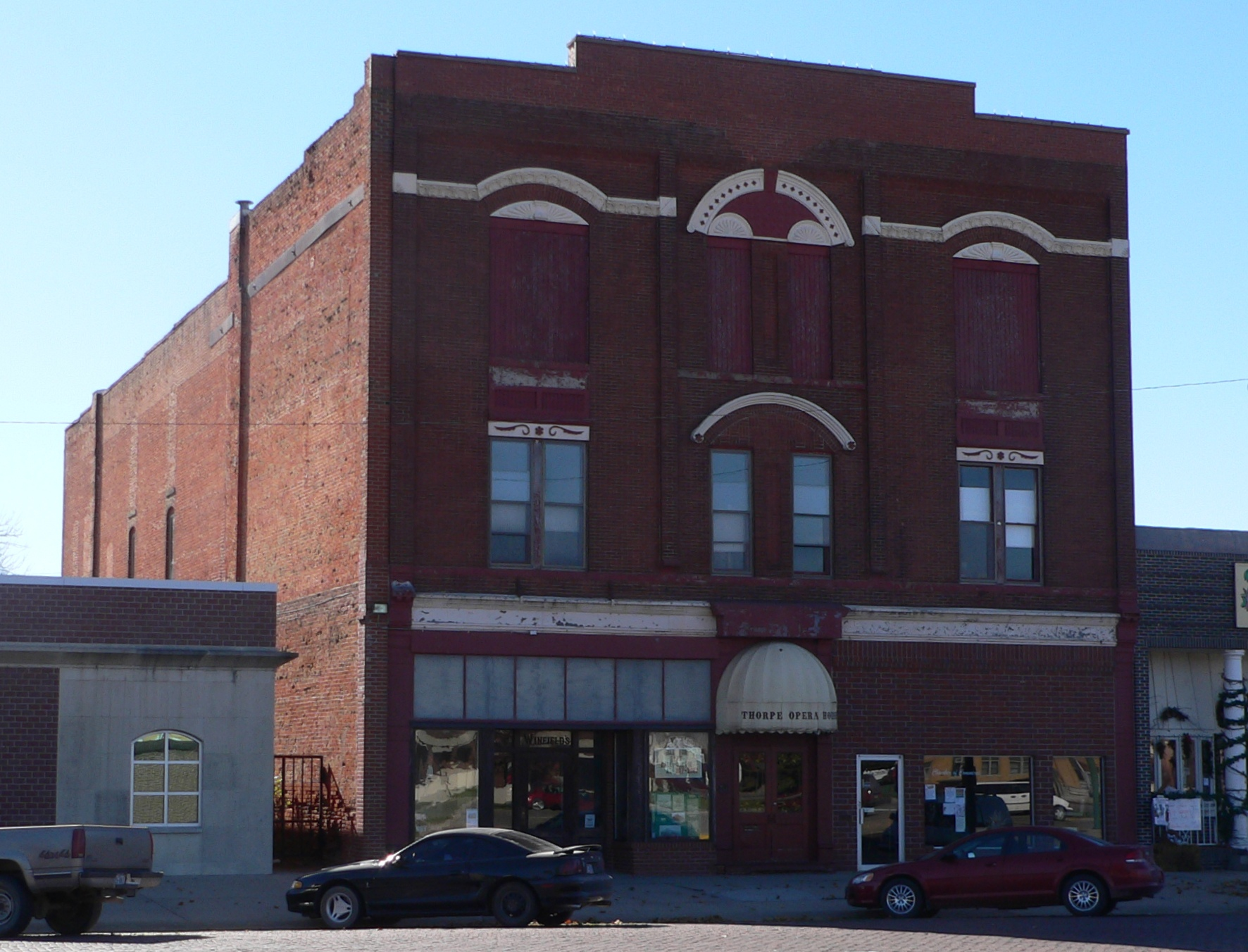
Thorpe Opera House

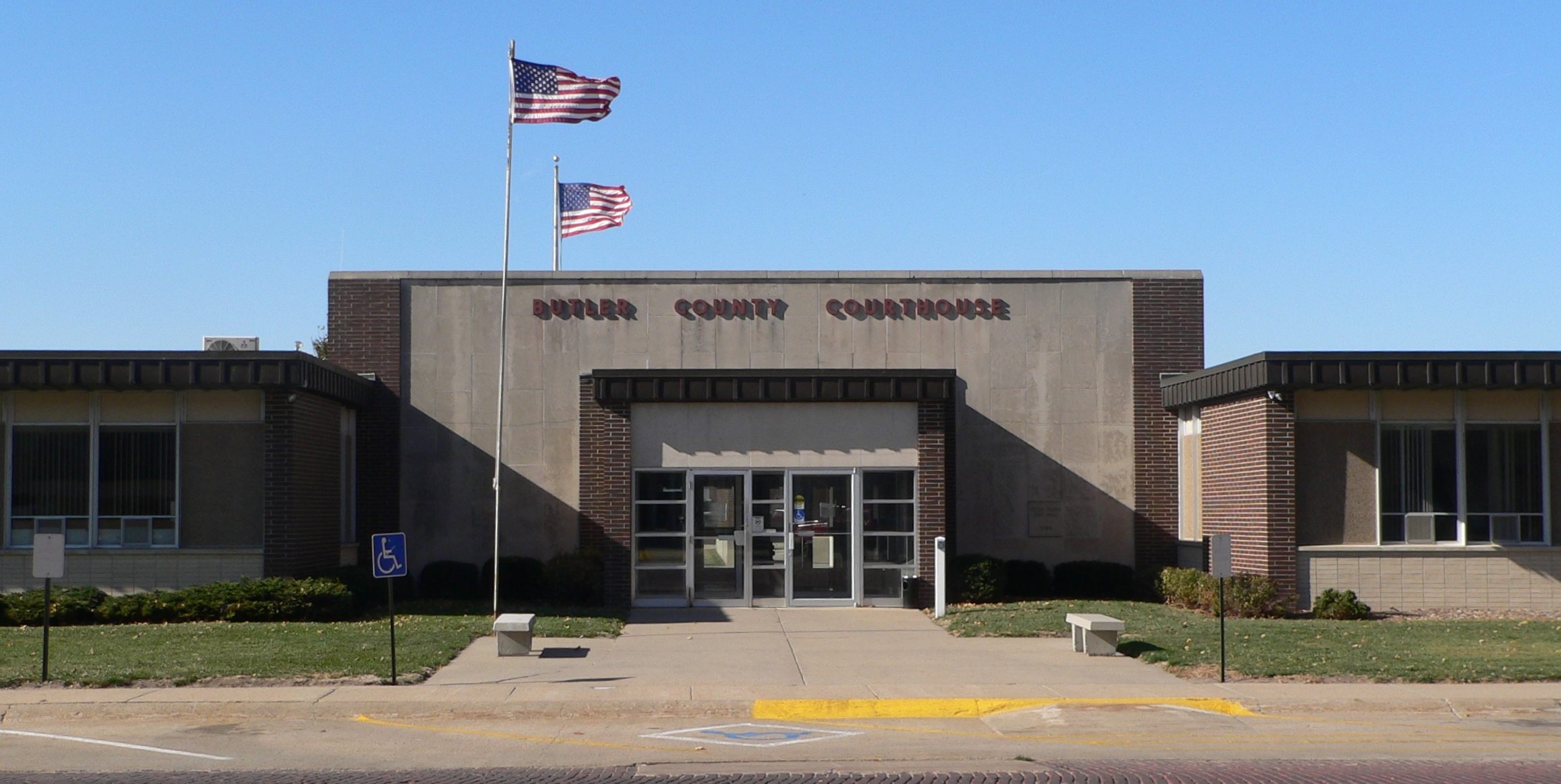
Butler County Courthouse

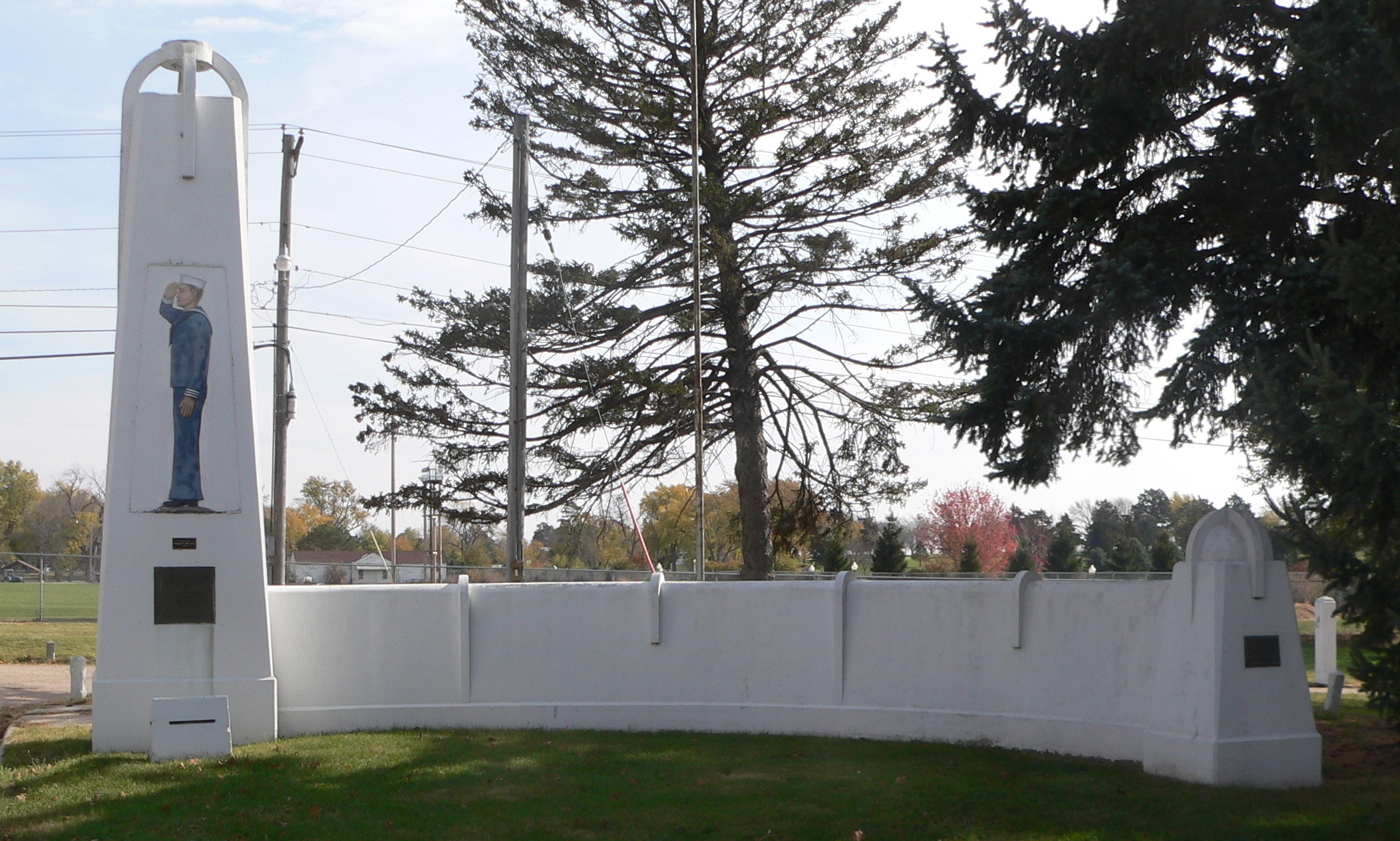
David City park W entrance

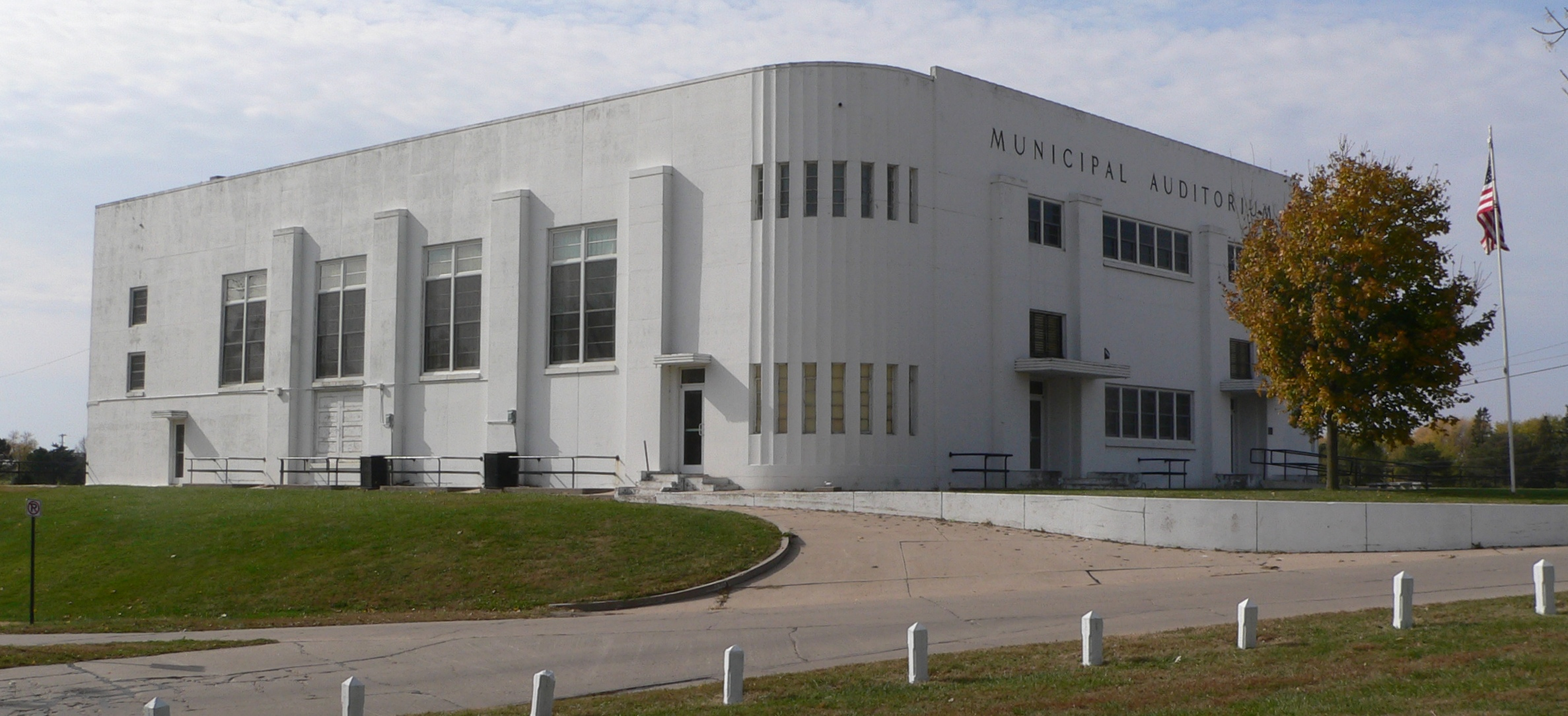
David City Municipal Auditorium
