= Aquinas High School =

Aquinas High School can refer to:

== In Kenya ==
- Aquinas High School (Nairobi, Kenya)

== In the United States ==
- Aquinas High School (California), San Bernardino, California
- Aquinas High School (Georgia), Augusta, Georgia
- Aquinas High School (Iowa) (merged in 2005), Fort Madison, Iowa
- Aquinas High School (Michigan), Southgate, Michigan
- Aquinas High School (Nebraska), David City, Nebraska
- Aquinas High School (New York), Bronx, New York City, New York
- Aquinas High School (Wisconsin), La Crosse, Wisconsin

== See also ==
- St. Thomas Aquinas High School (disambiguation)
- St. Thomas Aquinas Secondary School (disambiguation)
- Aquinas Institute, Rochester, New York
