= Aquinas Academy (Livingston, New Jersey) =

Coordinates: 40.7811°N 74.3194°W

- 388 South Livingston Avenue; Livingston, NJ 07039

Information
- Type: Catholic school
- Authority: Roman Catholic Archdiocese of Newark
- Principal: Eileen O'Neill
- Faculty: 13.5 (on FTE basis)
- Grades: PreK-8
- Enrollment: 156 (in K-8, plus 85 in PreK) (2009-10)
- Student to teacher ratio: 11.6:1
- Website: School website

Aquinas Academy (AQA) is a private coeducational Roman Catholic school located in Livingston, New Jersey that serves students from preschool through eighth grade. The school was founded in 1952 by Monsignor William McCann and the educational guidance of the Sisters of St. Dominic of Caldwell, New Jersey. The school is located on the campus of St. Philomena Parish (a Roman Catholic church) and operates under the supervision of the Roman Catholic Archdiocese of Newark. The school is accredited by the Middle States Association of Colleges and Schools.

The Academy is situated on the 30-acre (120,000 m^{2}) campus of Saint Philomena Parish. The original building, known today as McCann Hall, was formerly the Orange Rest Home. Throughout the years, additional buildings including a gymnasium, were added to the campus.

As of the 2009-10 school year, the school had an enrollment of 156 students (in K-8, plus 85 in PreKindergarten) and 13.5 classroom teachers (on an FTE basis), for a student–teacher ratio of 11.6:1.

As of June 30, 2025, the Aquinas Academy is now permanently closed.

== Awards and recognition ==
In September 2013, the school was one of 15 schools in New Jersey to be recognized by the United States Department of Education as part of the National Blue Ribbon Schools Program, which Education Secretary Arne Duncan described as schools that "represent examples of educational excellence".
