= Thomas Aquinas Dictionary =

Indexed quotations by Thomas Aquinas

- Author: Morris Stockhammer (editor); Theodore E. James (introduction)
- Language: English
- Subject: Philosophy/Theology
- Publisher: Philosophical Library
- Publication date: 1965
- Publication place: United States
- Pages: 219
- OCLC: 265433

The Thomas Aquinas Dictionary is a collection of quotations by medieval philosopher and theologian Thomas Aquinas, indexed by keywords contained within the quotations. Most of the quotations are taken from the Summa Theologica, with additional material from the Summa contra Gentiles. The quotations are listed without additional commentary or explanatory notes, although the volume does contain an introduction to the work of Thomas Aquinas written by Theodore E. James. Scholarly reviews were critical of the work when it was published, particularly in terms of the selection and arrangement of material. The book does, however, still appear in bibliographies of reference material on Thomas Aquinas.

== Overview ==
The Thomas Aquinas Dictionary was published by the Philosophical Library in 1965, with a British edition published the same year by Vision. It is one of a series of quotation dictionaries compiled by editor Morris Stockhammer, the others covering Immanuel Kant, Karl Marx and Plato.

The Dictionary contains quotations from the works of Thomas Aquinas, arranged under an alphabetical list of keywords, beginning with "Abstinence" and ending with "Zeal". Each entry lists quotations containing the word; the length of the quotations is generally one sentence. The dictionary does not contain any additional commentary or explanatory notes, with the exception of the introduction by Theodore E. James, which contains a summary of the life and works of Thomas Aquinas.

Most of the quotations are taken from the Summa Theologica, Aquinas's best-known work, with others from the Summa contra Gentiles. The keywords were selected on the basis of being of interest to the twentieth-century student, omitting some medieval concepts.

== Reception ==
Since its publication, the Dictionary has been frequently cited in bibliographies of recommended reference works on the life of Thomas Aquinas, although it attracted criticism in scholarly reviews when it was first published, mainly due to the selection and arrangement of material. Vernon Bourke wrote a particularly dismissive review in the medieval history journal Speculum, asserting that "scholars need not concern themselves with this so-called dictionary". He was especially concerned about the quotations being printed without context or commentary, thus limiting their usefulness or potentially altering their meaning.

Hans Bynagle, in his 21st-century guide to philosophical reference material, Philosophy: A Guide to the Reference Literature, echoed these concerns, pointing to the entry for "horse and donkey", which states: "Horse and Donkey are different beings, but both are animals". Bynagle also commented that, due to the keyword method of indexing used, the work lacks headings for concepts which would normally appear in discussions of Aquinas, such as "Ontology", "via negativa" or "The Five Ways".

A reviewer in The Review of Metaphysics (signed "J. K.") similarly pointed to the absence of Christian theological terms such as "Redemption", "Incarnation" and "Trinity". J.K. did highlight, however, the value of the dictionary in containing "an impressive number of entries most of which get several important text references". For him, the introduction was one of the strongest parts of the Dictionary, a view shared by others; even Bourke, who was otherwise critical of the work, described it as "competent".
