= Aquinas College of Higher Studies =

Private tertiary education institute in Borella, Sri Lanka

- Motto: Maitrya Satyajjjnasa
- Motto in English: Truth in Charity
- Type: Private Vocational University
- Established: 1954; 72 years ago
- Founders: Rev. Fr. Peter Pillai
- Accreditation: UGC, TVEC
- Religious affiliation: Roman Catholic Church
- Academic affiliations: International Federation of Catholic Universities (Partner)
- Location: Borella, Sri Lanka
- Website: aquinas.lk

The Aquinas College of Higher Studies also known as Aquinas University College is a Sri Lankan nonprofit private Tertiary education institute that provides both academic degrees and vocational training.

== History ==
The Aquinas College of Higher Studies was founded in 1953 by Catholic priests Peter A. Pillai, the former rector of St. Joseph's College, and Thomas Cooray, the Archbishop of Colombo, as a Catholic university open to all ethnic and religious groups. It was registered in 1954 by the Ministry of Education Ceylon and was established in Colombo 8.

Initially, it offered external degrees from local state universities such as Universities of Kelaniya, Peradeniya, Colombo and Sri Jayewardenepura, as well as foreign universities, while agricultural training was carried out in the 47-acre farm in Walpola, Ragama. After 2005, when it received approval to grant degrees, Aquinas moved on to develop its own degree programs. Since then, it has expanded both degree programs and infrastructure as well as attracting students from SAARC countries.

== Organisation ==
The Aquinas College of Higher Studies is run as a nonprofit philanthropic institution administered by the Archdiocese of Colombo. The college also works in close collaboration with foreign universities and higher educational authorities. It is accredited to provide its own academic degrees by the University Grants Commission (UGC) and is registered with the Tertiary and Vocational Educational Commission (TVEC) to provide vocational education.

=== Faculties ===
==== Faculty of Agriculture ====
- Department of Agri-Business Management
- Department of Crop Management
- Department of Livestock Management

==== Faculty of Business and Hospitality Management ====
- Department of Business Management
- Department of Hospitality Management

==== Faculty of Education & English ====
- Department of Education
- Department of English

==== Faculty of Science And Technology ====
- Department of Information & Communication Technology
- Department of Nursing & Pharmacy

==== Faculty of Social Sciences And Humanities ====
- Department of Humanities
- Department of Psychology
- Department of Religious Studies
- Department of Sister Formation
