= Aquinas (journal) =

Philosophy journal

- Editor: Leonardo Messinese
- Categories: Philosophy, Thomas Aquinas
- Frequency: Biannual
- Publisher: Pontifical Lateran University
- First issue: 1958
- Country: Vatican City
- Language: English
- Website: https://www.pul.va/aquinas/
- ISSN: 0003-7362

Aquinas is a philosophical journal published semi-annually by the Pontifical Lateran University. It was established in 1958.

The magazine is the official organ of the university's faculty of philosophy, and is based on subjects such as metaphysics, philosophical anthropology, epistemology and history.

== See also ==
- Nova et Vetera
- The Thomist
