= Tertiary and Vocational Education Commission =

Sri Lankan government agency

- Abbreviation: TVEC
- Formation: 1991
- Purpose: Policy formulation, planning, quality assurance, coordination and development of Technical and Vocational Education and Training
- Headquarters: Nipunatha Piyasa, Colombo, Sri Lanka
- Chairman: Dayantha Wijeysekara
- Website: tvec.gov.lk

Tertiary and Vocational Education Commission (TVEC) is the Sri Lankan state body responsible for the policy planning, regulation and development of tertiary and vocational education.TVEC was established in 1991 under the Tertiary and Vocational Education Act No 20 of 1990.
