= Aquinas Academy =

Aquinas Academy may refer to several schools:

- Aquinas Academy (Delaware), Bear, Delaware
- Aquinas Academy (New Jersey), Livingston, New Jersey
- Aquinas Academy (Pittsburgh, Pennsylvania), Pittsburgh, Pennsylvania
- Aquinas Academy (Menomonee Falls, Wisconsin), Menomonee Falls, Wisconsin
