= Dave Conlon =

British football coach

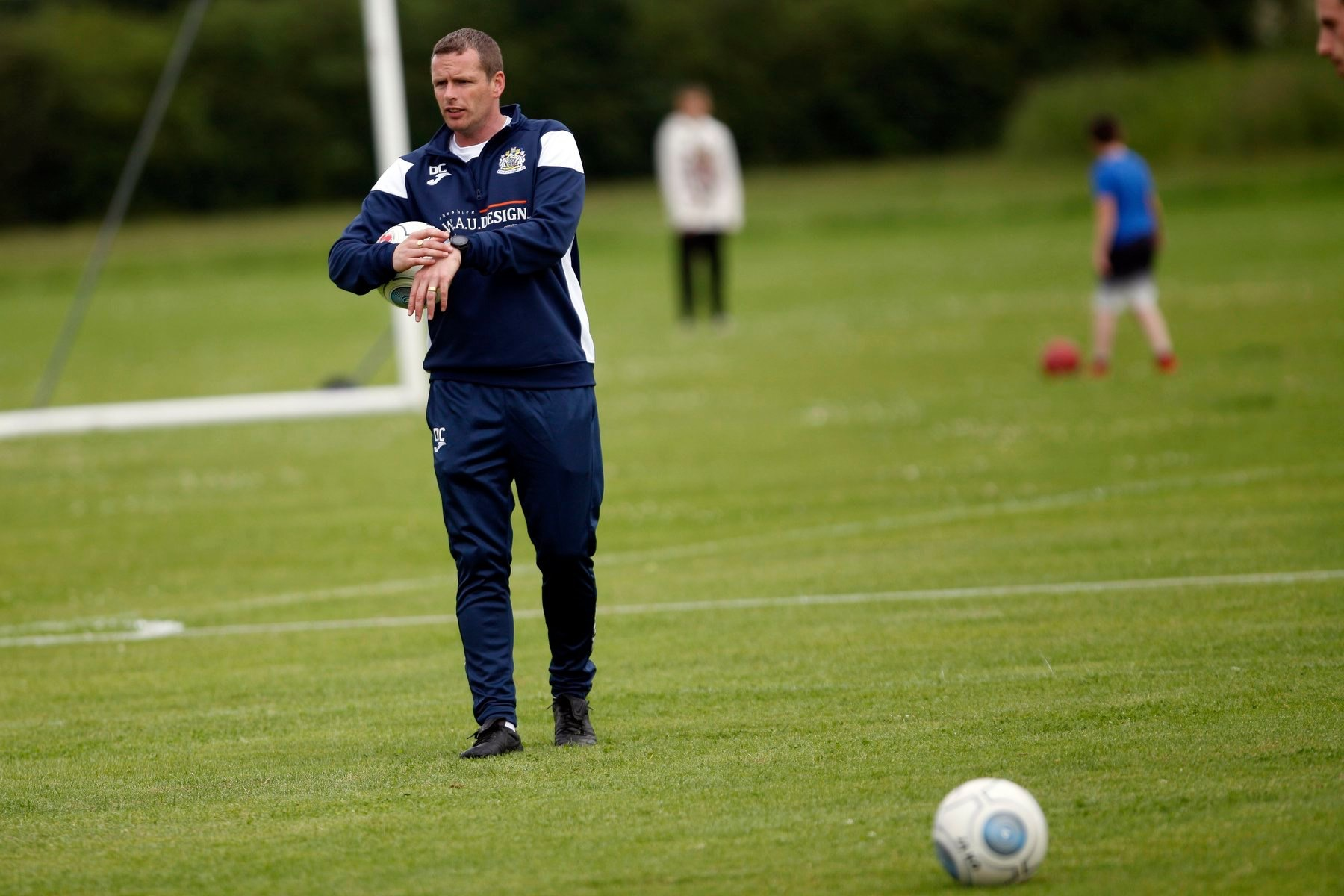
Full length image of Conlon

Dave Conlon is an English football coach who is currently assistant head coach at Hartlepool United.

Conlon joined Stockport County as a part-time coach in 2013. During this time he was also a PE Teacher at Aquinas College in Stockport.

After Jim Gannon was dismissed as Stockport County manager in January 2021, Conlon became the caretaker manager for a match against Boreham Wood, and took temporary charge for the next game against Dover Athletic. Whilst at Stockport, they won the National League and EFL League Two titles.

On 1 October 2026, following the appointment of Pete Wild at National League club Hartlepool United, Conlon joined Wild as his assistant.
