= Chrysler Akino =

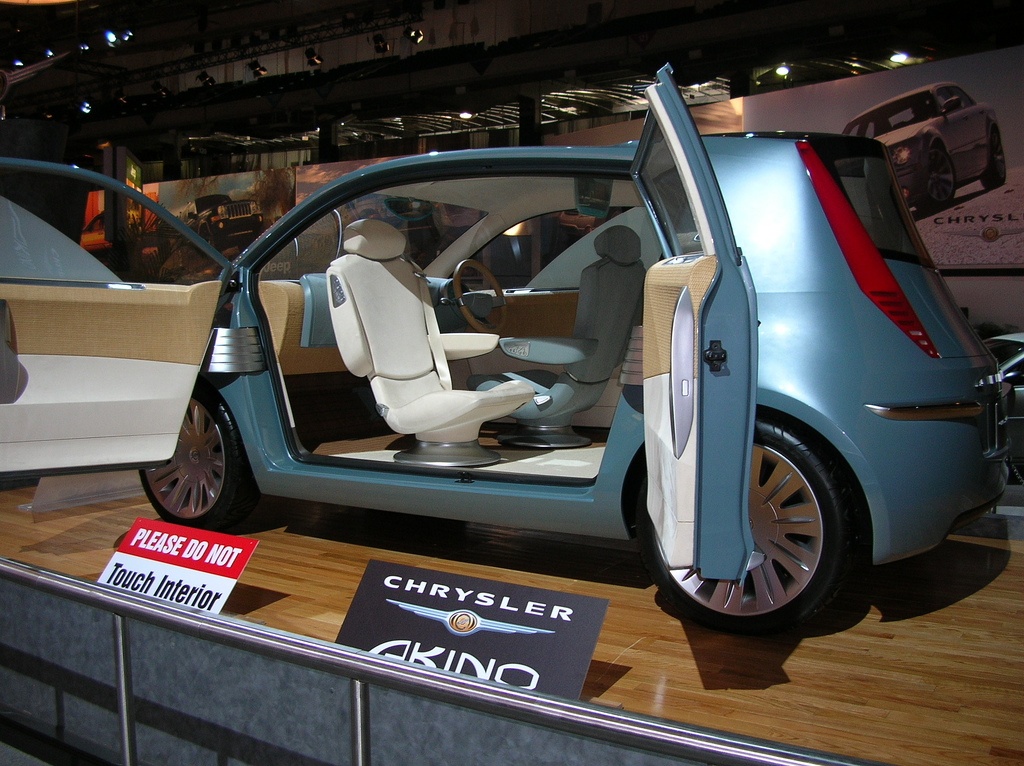
- The Chrysler Akino in the 2005 Tokyo Motor Show

Overview
- Manufacturer: DaimlerChrysler
- Production: 2005 (Concept car)
- Designer: Akino Tsuchiya

Body and chassis
- Class: Subcompact car
- Body style: 3-door hatchback
- Layout: Front-engine, front-wheel-drive
- Doors: Conventional doors (front); Coach Doors (1-door rear)
- Related: Chrysler PT Cruiser; Lancia/Chrysler Ypsilon

Powertrain
- Engine: 1.5 L I4

The Chrysler Akino is a concept car created by Chrysler. The Akino was first shown at the 2005 Tokyo Motor Show. It was designed at Chrysler's Pacifica Studio in California and was named after the designer of the concept car, Akino Tsuchiya.

== Design ==
The Akino was a design concept, as its engine was not tested. It was designed as a modern, one-box design for a subcompact car. It only had one door on the driver's side and two doors on the passenger's side, with the rear passenger door being a suicide door. Inside, it had 4 seats and a trunk that opened upwards like most hatchbacks. The passenger doors opened up in opposite directions, much like the Honda Element. The roof also featured an interlocking form which could give out more headroom. The interior of the Akino featured swiveling front seats, both natural and recyclable synthetic fabrics, bamboo flooring, a throw rug and pillows, and mood lighting.
