= St Thomas School =

St Thomas School may refer to:

- St Thomas School, Kalyan
- St Thomas School, Kolkata
- St. Thomas' School, Leipzig
- St Thomas Secondary School, Pahang, Malaysia
- St Thomas Primary School, Pahang, Malaysia
- St Thomas Secondary School, Sarawak, Malaysia
- St Thomas Primary School, Sarawak, Malaysia

== See also ==
- St. Thomas Aquinas Secondary School (disambiguation)
