= St. Thomas Aquinas School, Witbank =

St Thomas Aquinas School is a parochial school and a client member of IEB in Witbank, South Africa, which has based its education on Catholic Church values and discipline.
