= St. Thomas Aquinas High School =

St. Thomas Aquinas High School may refer to:

Canada

- St. Thomas Aquinas Catholic High School (North Vancouver), British Columbia
- St. Thomas Aquinas Catholic High School (Russell, Ontario)
- St. Thomas Aquinas Catholic Secondary School (Lindsay), Ontario
- St. Thomas Aquinas Catholic Secondary School (London, Ontario)
- St. Thomas Aquinas Catholic Secondary School (Oakville), Ontario

Ghana

- St. Thomas Aquinas Senior High School, Cantonments, Accra

United Kingdom

- St. Thomas Aquinas High School (Edinburgh), Scotland

United States

- St. Thomas Aquinas High School (Connecticut), New Britain, Connecticut
- St. Thomas Aquinas High School (Florida), Ft. Lauderdale, Florida
- St. Thomas Aquinas Catholic High School (Guam)
- St. Thomas Aquinas High School (Overland Park, Kansas)
- Saint Thomas Aquinas High School (Louisiana), Hammond, Louisiana
- St. Thomas Aquinas High School (New Hampshire), Dover, New Hampshire
- St. Thomas Aquinas High School (New Jersey), Edison, New Jersey
- St. Thomas Aquinas High School (Ohio), Louisville, Ohio

== See also ==
- Aquinas High School (disambiguation)
- St. Thomas Aquinas Secondary School (disambiguation)
- St. Thomas High School (disambiguation)
- St Thomas School (disambiguation)
