= The Aquinas =

Student newspaper in Pennsylvania, US

- Type: Weekly newspaper
- Format: Broadsheet
- Owner: University of Scranton
- Publisher: University of Scranton
- Editor-in-chief: Eliana Saks
- Founded: January 1916
- Headquarters: Scranton, Pennsylvania
- Website: The Aquinas
- Free online archives: Archived Editions of The Aquinas

The Aquinas is the weekly student newspaper of the University of Scranton in Scranton, Pennsylvania. Print editions are published every Thursday during the semester and distributed to buildings throughout the university's campus.

== History ==
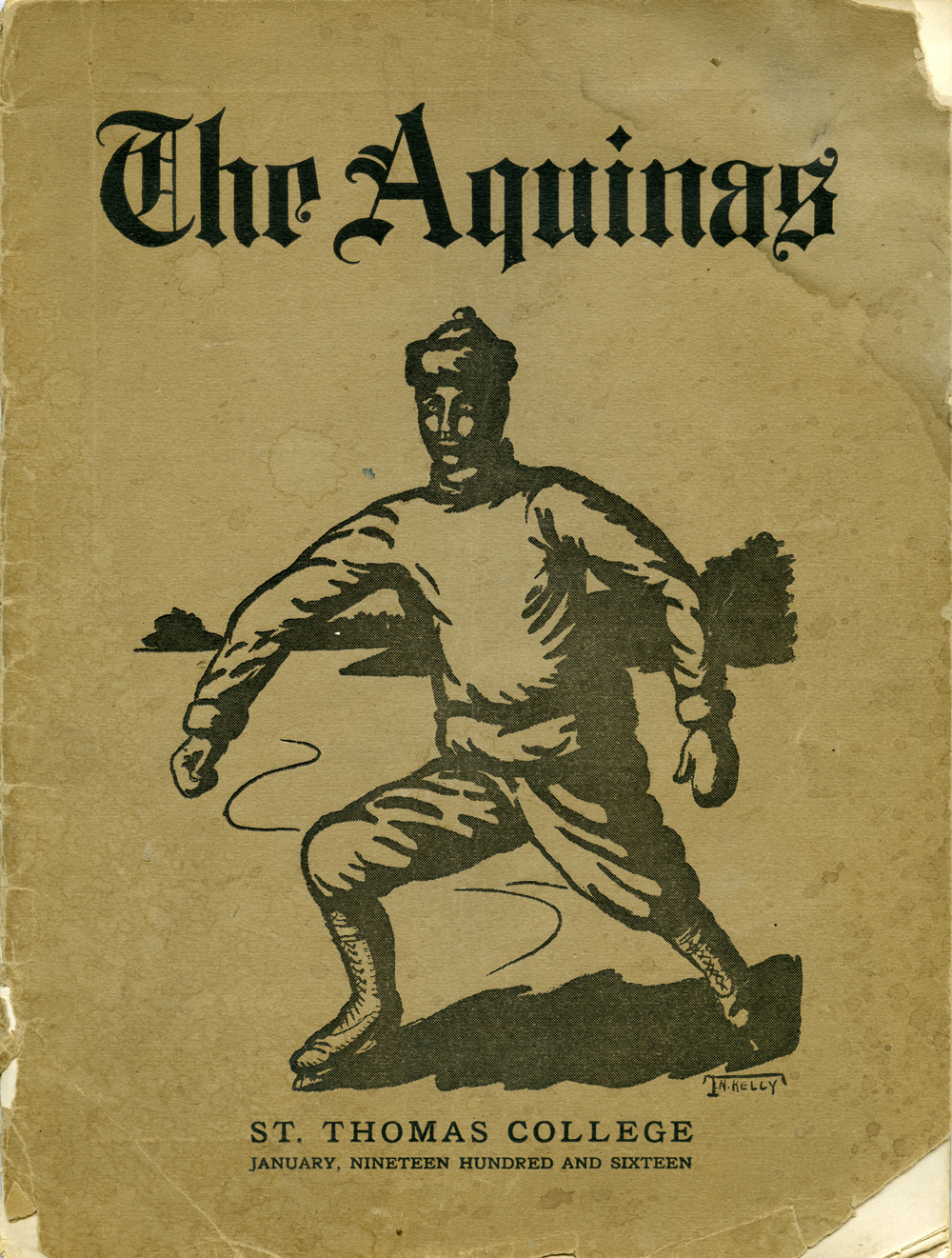
The first issue of The Aquinas, published in January 1916.

The Aquinas, the university's first student publication, was originally established in 1916 as the monthly literary magazine of St. Thomas College, now called the University of Scranton. The inaugural issue of The Aquinas was published in January 1916. The publication remained a literary magazine from 1916 until 1931, with the final issue of each academic year serving as a yearbook for St. Thomas College's graduating class.

In 1931, The Aquinas became the student newspaper of St. Thomas College. (The school was renamed The University of Scranton in 1938). The newspaper has been published weekly or biweekly throughout its history. The Aquinas is presently a weekly newspaper, published on Thursdays.

In February 2014, the newspaper's staff released an editorial calling for improved access to information, including university crime statistics.
