= Aquino =

Aquino may refer to:

- Aquino, Italy, a small town in Frosinone, Italy
- Aquino (surname), including a list of people
- Aquino family, a political family in the Philippines
- Aquino, a book about Benigno Aquino, Jr. and Corazon Aquino by author Mel White
