= Aquinas College, Stockport =

Aquinas College

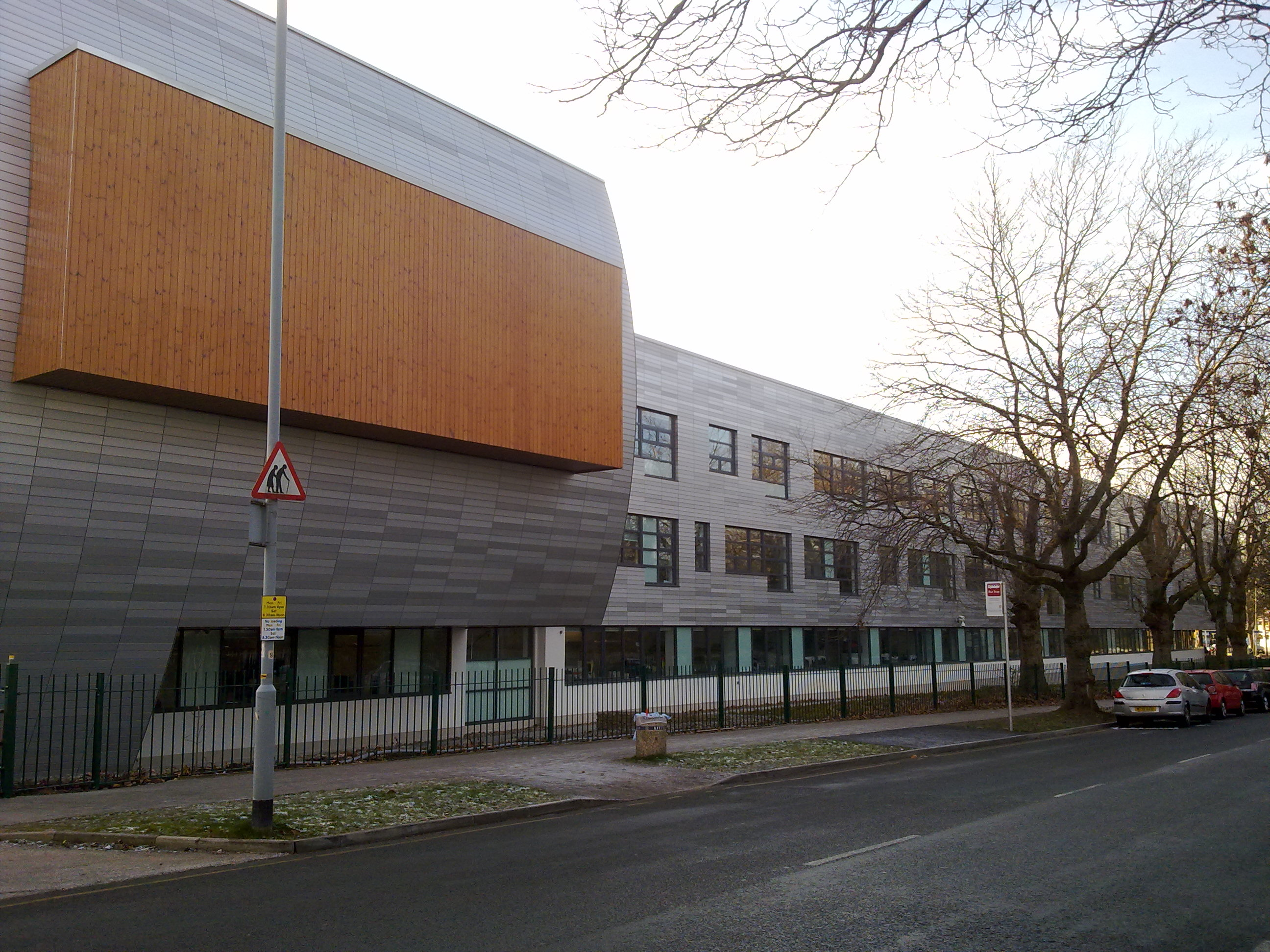
- College Building at the Car Park entrance.

Location
- Nangreave Road; Stockport, Greater Manchester, SK2 6TH; England; 53.3962°N 2.1476°W

Information
- Type: Sixth form college
- Religious affiliation: Roman Catholic
- Established: 1980; 46 years ago
- Local authority: Stockport Metropolitan Borough Council
- Oversight: Roman Catholic Diocese of Shrewsbury
- Department for Education URN: 130514 Tables
- Ofsted: Reports
- Principal: Jo Dommett
- Gender: Mixed
- Age: 16 to 19
- Enrolment: 1,927
- Colours: Red and white
- Publication: E-Journal
- Website: aquinas.ac.uk

Aquinas College is a Roman Catholic sixth form college in Stockport, Greater Manchester, England. The college offers a range of Level 2 and Level 3 courses including GCSEs, A-Levels, and other vocational courses such as BTECs. The college also offers various adult education courses.

== History ==
The college was established in 1980 by the Diocese of Shrewsbury and is named after St. Thomas Aquinas. The college was opened on the site of St. Michael's Secondary School.

Ambrose Smith was the college principal from 1989 to 2011. During his tenure the college was so popular among school leavers in the Stockport area that it received twice as many applications as there were places. During this time the college expanded from 400 to 2000 students. In 2010 a new main building was opened. In 2011 Danny Pearson succeeded Ambrose Smith as principal. Jo Dommett became principal in September 2025.

The college was rated as "Good" at its most recent Ofsted inspection, which was carried out in 2023.

== Notable alumni ==
- Archie Atkinson, cyclist
- Josh Dewhurst, guitarist of Blossoms
- Sacha Dhawan, actor
- Dominic Monaghan, actor
- Kate Richardson-Walsh, field hockey player
- Matt Walker, Paralympic swimmer

== Notable staff ==
- Dave Conlon, football coach
