= St. Thomas Aquinas Catholic Secondary School (Lindsay) =

Location
- 260 Angeline St. South; Lindsay, Ontario, K9V 0J8; Canada; 44.33481°N 78.74227°W

Information
- School type: Publicly funded Catholic Secondary School
- Motto: Educating for Life
- Religious affiliation: Roman Catholic
- Founded: 2000
- School board: Peterborough Victoria Northumberland and Clarington Catholic District School Board
- Superintendent: Timothy Moloney
- Principal: Jonathan Di Ianni
- Grades: 9 - 12, including Victory lap (academia)
- Enrollment: 300 (approx.) (September 2016)
- Language: English, French Immersion
- Colours: Blue and Gold
- Mascot: Tommy the Titan
- Team name: Titans
- Website: stacss.ca

St. Thomas Aquinas Catholic Secondary School is a Catholic secondary school located in the southern part of Lindsay, Ontario. It is currently the only Catholic secondary school in the City of Kawartha Lakes. The school was opened in 2000, and celebrated its 10th anniversary on March 29, 2011.

There are approximately 338 students enrolled in grades 9 through 12, making it the smallest of three High Schools located in Lindsay. Students are required to wear a uniform purchased from R.J. McCarthy in navy blue, white, gold, and khaki pieces specific to St. Thomas Aquinas Catholic Secondary School. The school offers classes for the workplace, college and university-bound student, as well as a Specialist High Skills Majors (SHSM) in Health/Wellness and an Agriculture Specialist High Skills Major program, introduced in 2019. A French immersion program was introduced in 2016. Advanced Placement courses are also offered. K courses are also offered at the school for students who are not achieving credits but are working towards building basic life skills, social skills and skills to prepare them for entry-level jobs in the workplace.

== Sports ==
St. Thomas Aquinas offers a variety of male and female sports, including:

- Cross Country Running
- Basketball
- Volleyball
- Hockey
- Baseball
- Track and Field
- Swimming
- Soccer
- Badminton
- Intramurals

== St. Thomas Aquinas SHSM partnerships ==
St. Thomas Aquinas has professional and community partnerships for SHSM students:

== Ontario Youth Apprenticeship Program (OYAP) ==
The Ontario Youth Apprenticeship Program consists of a unique combination of Community College Trades Training and a Secondary School Cooperative Education Program. Students are registered as apprentices with the Ministry of Training, Colleges and Universities (MTCU) and attend the college one to three days per week. By the end of the semester, they can earn their Basic - Level One Trade Qualifications in that program. The student remains an OYAP Apprentice until the end of the semester. Fees associated with the registration and College textbooks are covered by the OYAP Board Budget. These programs are considered “Dual Credit Programs” since the students receive both Secondary School and College credits during the semester. St. Thomas Aquinas' OYAP program is partnered with Durham College, Fleming College, and Loyalist College.

== Feeder schools ==
- Pope John Paul II Catholic Elementary School, Lindsay
- St. Dominic Catholic Elementary School, Lindsay
- St. Luke Catholic Elementary School, Downeyville
- St. Mary Catholic Elementary School, Lindsay

== See also ==
- Education in Ontario
- List of secondary schools in Ontario
