= Aquinas Catholic Schools (Nebraska) =

Private, coeducational school in David City, Nebraska

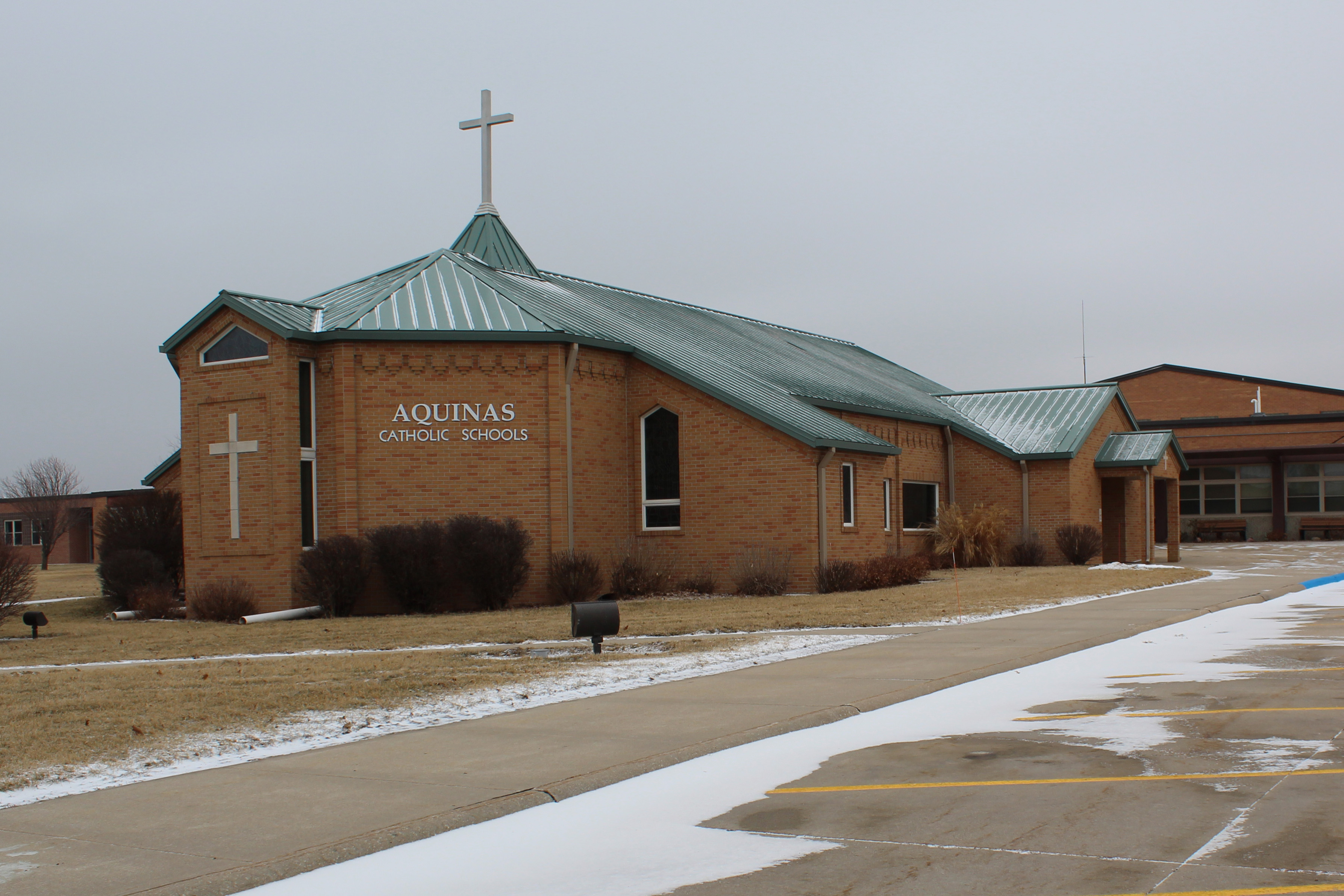

Location
- 3420 Main Road (secondary); 1026 5th Street (elementary); David City, (Butler County), Nebraska 68632; United States; 41°14′28″N 97°7′42″W

Information
- Type: Private, coeducational
- Motto: "Fides Et Ratio”
- Religious affiliation: Roman Catholic
- Established: 1961
- Superintendent: Fr. Brian Connor
- Principal: Mrs. Sandy VanCura
- Grades: K–12
  - Grade 9: 43
  - Grade 10: 60
  - Grade 11: 42
  - Grade 12: 40
- Colors: Black, white and gold
- Fight song: "There is No Place Like Aquinas"
- Athletics conference: Centennial Conference
- Team name: Monarchs
- Rival: Scotus Central Catholic David City High School
- Newspaper: The Crown Prints
- Yearbook: Aquin
- Affiliation: Diocese of Lincoln
- Activities Director: Ron Mimick
- Website: http://www.aquinas-catholic.com/

Aquinas Catholic Schools is a private, Roman Catholic K-12 school institution in David City, Nebraska, United States. It is located in the Roman Catholic Diocese of Lincoln.

It consists of an elementary campus and a middle and high school campus.

== Activities ==
Aquinas is a member of the Nebraska School Activities Association. They have won the following NSAA State Championships:

- Boys' football - 1980, 1993, 1994, 1997, 2011, 2012, 2014, 2015 (runner-up - 1981, 1992, 2013)
- Boys' cross country - 2002, 2003, 2020
- Boys' basketball - 1997, 2006
- Boys' wrestling-individual - 1994, 2001, 2002, 2004, 2022, 2023, 2024
- Boys' wrestling-dual - 2020, 2022, 2023, 2024 (runner-up 2019, 2026 third place - 2025)
- Boys' track and field - 2005, 2021
- Girls' track and field - 1979, 1981, 1982
- Girls' volleyball - 2009
- Girls' cross country - 2016
- Coed play production - 2011, 2018, 2019
- Coed speech - 1996
