= St. Thomas Aquinas Secondary School =

St. Thomas Aquinas Secondary School may refer to:

In Canada:

- St. Thomas Aquinas Secondary School (Brampton), Ontario
- St. Thomas Aquinas Catholic Secondary School (Lindsay), Ontario
- St. Thomas Aquinas Catholic Secondary School (London, Ontario)
- St. Thomas Aquinas Catholic Secondary School (Oakville), Ontario
- St. Thomas Aquinas Catholic Secondary School (Tottenham), Ontario

In England:

- St. Thomas Aquinas Catholic School, Birmingham

In Ghana:

- St. Thomas Aquinas Senior High School

In Scotland:

- St. Thomas Aquinas Secondary School, Glasgow

== See also ==
- St. Thomas Aquinas High School (disambiguation)
