= List of county courthouses in Nebraska =

This is the list of country courthouses in Nebraska; for federal ones, see List of United States federal courthouses in Nebraska.

The state of Nebraska has 93 counties. The Nebraska State Historical Society conducted a 1990 study of county courthouses in the state.

Courthouses marked with a †dagger are listed on the National Register of Historic Places.

Courthouse	Image	County	Location	Built	Notes
Adams County Courthouse		Adams	Hastings	1962	Modern style
Antelope County Courthouse†		Antelope	Neligh; 42°07′48″N 98°01′44″W	1894	Romanesque atyle
Arthur County Courthouse		Arthur	Arthur; 41°34′12″N 101°41′28″W	1961	Modern style for new courthouse (pictured) Italianate features (old courthouse) - photo can be found on Wikipedia photo
Banner County Courthouse		Banner	Harrisburg	1957	Modern style
Blaine County Courthouse		Blaine	Brewster		Two-story wooden and stone block box building
Boone County Courthouse		Boone	Albion	1976	Modern style
Box Butte County Courthouse†		Box Butte	Alliance; 42°5′59″N 102°52′12″W	1913	Beaux Arts style.
Boyd County Courthouse		Boyd	Butte		Modern style
Brown County Courthouse		Brown	Ainsworth	1959	Modern style
Buffalo County Courthouse		Buffalo	Kearney	1974	Modern style
Burt County Courthouse†		Burt	Tekamah; 41°46′43″N 96°13′13″W	1916	Beaux Arts style
Butler County Courthouse		Butler	David City		Modern style
Cass County Courthouse†		Cass	Plattsmouth; 41°00′42″N 95°53′01″W	1892	Romanesque style
Cedar County Courthouse†		Cedar	Hartington; 42°37′12″N 97°15′50″W	1891	Romanesque Revival style
Chase County Courthouse†		Chase	Imperial; 40°31′14″N 101°38′36″W	1912	Tudor Revival with Jacobethan features (unique in Nebraska courthouses' architecture).
Cherry County Courthouse†		Cherry	Valentine; 42°52′34″N 100°33′2″W	1901	Romanesque style
Cheyenne County Courthouse		Cheyenne	Sidney		Modern style
Clay County Courthouse†		Clay	Clay Center; 40°31′16″N 98°3′16″W	1918	Beaux Arts style (County Citidel school)
Colfax County Courthouse†		Colfax	Schuyler; 41°26′49″N 97°03′18″W	1921	Renaissance Revival style
Cuming County Courthouse		Cuming	West Point	1954	Art Deco (modern style)
Custer County Courthouse†		Custer	Broken Bow; 41°24′09″N 99°38′32″W	1911	Classical Revival style
Dakota County Courthouse		Dakota	Dakota City	1940-41	Art Deco (WPA project 1940–1941)
Dawes County Courthouse†		Dawes	Chadron; 42°49′57″N 103°19′51″W	1935	Art Deco, designed by John Latenser & Sons
Dawson County Courthouse†		Dawson	Lexington; 40°46′49″N 99°44′25″W	1913-14	Beaux-Arts.
Deuel County Courthouse†		Deuel	Chappell	1915	Classical Revival Style
Dixon County Courthouse†		Dixon	Ponca	1884, 1940	Federal Style (1883–84)
Dodge County Courthouse†		Dodge	Fremont	1917	Classical revival Style
Douglas County Courthouse†		Douglas	Omaha	1912	Renaissance Revival Style
Dundy County Courthouse†		Dundy	Benkelman	1921	Federal Style (1921–22) with American Movement features
Fillmore County Courthouse†		Fillmore	Geneva	1892	Richardsonian Romanesque Style
Franklin County Courthouse†		Franklin	Franklin	1925	Classical Revival Style
Frontier County Courthouse		Frontier	Stockville	1889	Federal style (last courthouse in USA to be retrofitted with indoor plumbing)
Furnas County Courthouse		Furnas	Beaver City	1949	Art Deco style
Gage County Courthouse†		Gage	Beatrice	1890	Richardsonian Romanesque
Garden County Courthouse†		Garden	Oshkosh	1921	Classical Revival style
Garfield County Courthouse		Garfield	Burwell		Modern style
Gosper County Courthouse†		Gosper	Elwood	1939	Art Deco style ( WPA 1939)
Grant County Courthouse		Grant	Hyannis	1957	Utilitarian style
Greeley County Courthouse†		Greeley	Greeley	1914	Classical Revival style
Hall County Courthouse†		Hall	Grand Island	1901	Beaux Arts style
Hamilton County Courthouse†		Hamilton	Aurora	1894	Romanesque style
Harlan County Courthouse		Harlan	Alma	1964	Modern style
Hayes County Courthouse		Hayes	Hayes Center	1954	Modern style
Hitchcock County Courthouse		Hitchcock	Trenton	1969	Modern style
Holt County Courthouse†		Holt	O'Neill	1936	County Citidel style
Hooker County Courthouse†		Hooker	Mullen	1912	American Movements style (county citadel)
Howard County Courthouse†		Howard	St. Paul	1912	Classical revival style
Jefferson County Courthouse†		Jefferson	Fairbury	1891	Second Empire style
Johnson County Courthouse†		Johnson	Tecumseh	1889	Romanesque Revival style
Kearney County Courthouse†		Kearney	Minden	1906	Classical Revival style
Keith County Courthouse		Keith	Ogallala		Modern style
Keya Paha County Courthouse		Keya Paha	Springview	1914	Federal style
Kimball County Courthouse†		Kimball	Kimball	1928	Classical Revival Style
Knox County Courthouse†		Knox	Center	1934	Art Deco & Federal styles
Lancaster County Courthouse		Lancaster	Lincoln		Modern style (Brutalist)
Lincoln County Courthouse†		Lincoln	North Platte	1922	Beaux Arts style
Logan County Courthouse		Logan	Stapleton	1963	Modern style
Loup County Courthouse		Loup	Taylor		Modern style
Madison County Courthouse		Madison	Madison		Modern style
McPherson County Courthouse		McPherson	Tryon		Modern style
Merrick County Courthouse†		Merrick	Central City	1913	Classical revival style
Morrill County Courthouse†		Morrill	Bridgeport	1909	Classical Revival style
Nance County Courthouse		Nance	Fullerton	1974	Modern style
Nemaha County Courthouse†		Nemaha	Auburn	1900	Romanesque style
Nuckolls County Courthouse†		Nuckolls	Nelson	1890	Beaux Arts & Italianate style
Otoe County Courthouse†		Otoe	Nebraska City	1865	Italianate style
Pawnee County Courthouse†		Pawnee	Pawnee City	1911	Classical Revival style
Perkins County Courthouse†		Perkins	Grant	1927	Classical revival style
Phelps County Courthouse†		Phelps	Holdrege	1910	Beaux Arts style
Pierce County Courthouse		Pierce	Pierce	1978	Modern style
Platte County Courthouse†		Platte	Columbus	1920	Grecian-Ionic style
Polk County Courthouse†		Polk	Osceola	1921	Beaux Arts style
Red Willow County Courthouse†		Red Willow	McCook	1926	Classical Revival style
Richardson County Courthouse†		Richardson	Falls City	1924	Classical Revival style
Rock County Courthouse†		Rock	Bassett	1939	Art Deco style
Saline County Courthouse†		Saline	Wilber	1928	Grecian-Doric style
Sarpy County Courthouse		Sarpy	Papillion	1974	Modern style Old courthouse still stands: Classical Revival style (administrative site)
Saunders County Courthouse†		Saunders	Wahoo	1904	Second Renaissance Revival style
Scotts Bluff County Courthouse†		Scotts Bluff	Gering	1920	Classical revival style
Seward County Courthouse†		Seward	Seward	1907	Classical Revival style
Sheridan County Courthouse†		Sheridan	Rushville	1904	County Capitol style
Sherman County Courthouse†		Sherman	Loup City	1920	Beaux Arts style
Sioux County Courthouse†		Sioux	Harrison	1930	County Citidel style
Stanton County Courthouse		Stanton	Stanton	1976	Modern style
Thayer County Courthouse		Thayer	Hebron	1901	Romanesque Revival style
Thomas County Courthouse		Thomas	Thedford		Modern style
Thurston County Courthouse†		Thurston	Pender	1895, 1927	Late Victorian style
Valley County Courthouse†		Valley	Ord	1921	Beaux Arts style
Washington County Courthouse†		Washington	Blair	1891	Renaissance style
Wayne County Courthouse†		Wayne	Wayne	1899	Richardsonian Romanesque style
Webster County Courthouse†		Webster	Red Cloud; 40.091389°N 98.521111°W	1883	Second Renaissance Revival style (county citadel)
Wheeler County Courthouse		Wheeler	Bartlett; 41°53′03″N 98°33′06″W	1982	Modern style
York County Courthouse		York	York		Modern style (brutalist)

== See also ==
- List of United States federal courthouses in Nebraska
- List of courthouses in the United States
