= National Register of Historic Places listings in Jefferson County, Nebraska =

Location of Jefferson County in Nebraska

Jefferson County, Nebraska, United States, has 15 properties and districts listed on the National Register of Historic Places.

The locations of National Register properties and districts for which the latitude and longitude coordinates are included below may be seen in a map.

This National Park Service list is complete through NPS recent listings posted October 30, 2026.

== Listings county-wide ==
	Name on the Register	Image	Date listed	Location	City or town	Description
1	Colman House	Colman House	June 25, 1982 (#82003191)	501 Lavelle St. 40°06′29″N 96°56′12″W	Diller	
2	Anna C. Diller Opera House	Anna C. Diller Opera House	July 6, 1988 (#88000932)	Commercial and Hilton; 40°06′30″N 96°56′08″W	Diller	
3	District No. 1 School of Jefferson County	District No. 1 School of Jefferson County	December 8, 1997 (#97001520)	Junction of N. 2nd and Curtis Sts. 40°02′24″N 97°01′12″W	Steele City	
4	District No. 10 School	District No. 10 School	December 15, 1978 (#78001702)	Intersection of county roads 717 Rd and 559 Av; 40°13′11″N 97°20′59″W	Powell	
5	Fairbury Commercial Historic District	Fairbury Commercial Historic District	June 20, 1997 (#97000610)	Roughly bounded by 6th, F, 3rd, and B Sts., and railroad tracks 40°08′10″N 97°10′50″W	Fairbury	
6	Fairbury Jr/Sr High School and Gymnasium-Auditorium	Fairbury Jr/Sr High School and Gymnasium-Auditorium	March 25, 1999 (#99000391)	Roughly bounded by J and K St., and 7th and 8th Sts. 40°08′20″N 97°10′17″W	Fairbury	
7	Fairbury Public-Carnegie Library	Fairbury Public-Carnegie Library	September 12, 1985 (#85002141)	601 7th St. 40°08′19″N 97°10′42″W	Fairbury	
8	Fairbury Rock Island Depot and Freight House	Fairbury Rock Island Depot and Freight House	June 21, 1996 (#96000681)	910 2nd Street; 40°07′57″N 97°10′26″W	Fairbury	
9	IOOF Temple Building	IOOF Temple Building	June 15, 1987 (#87000925)	523 E St. 40°08′13″N 97°10′49″W	Fairbury	
10	Jefferson County Courthouse	Jefferson County Courthouse	November 27, 1972 (#72000751)	Courthouse Sq. 40°08′08″N 97°10′49″W	Fairbury	
11	John C. Kesterson House	John C. Kesterson House	June 26, 2019 (#100004142)	907 4th St. 40°08′07″N 97°10′27″W	Fairbury	
12	People's State Bank	People's State Bank	December 13, 1984 (#84000509)	Nebraska Highway 103; 40°06′34″N 96°56′07″W	Diller	Now occupied by Diller Historical Society and Diller Museum
13	Site No. JF00-072	Site No. JF00-072	June 19, 1987 (#87001000)	Junction of Thayer, Jefferson, Washington, and Republic county lines 40°00′07″N 97°22′09″W	Buckley Precinct	
14	Woral C. Smith Lime Kiln and Limestone House	Woral C. Smith Lime Kiln and Limestone House	December 3, 1974 (#74001124)	2 miles northwest of Fairbury; 40°11′44″N 97°13′36″W	Fairbury	
15	Steele City Historic District	Steele City Historic District	March 16, 1972 (#72000752)	Roughly bounded by Main and 2nd Sts., Gardline, and the St. Joseph and Western Railroad railroad line 40°02′14″N 97°01′23″W	Steele City	

== See also ==
- List of National Historic Landmarks in Nebraska
- National Register of Historic Places listings in Nebraska
