= William F. Gernandt =

American architect

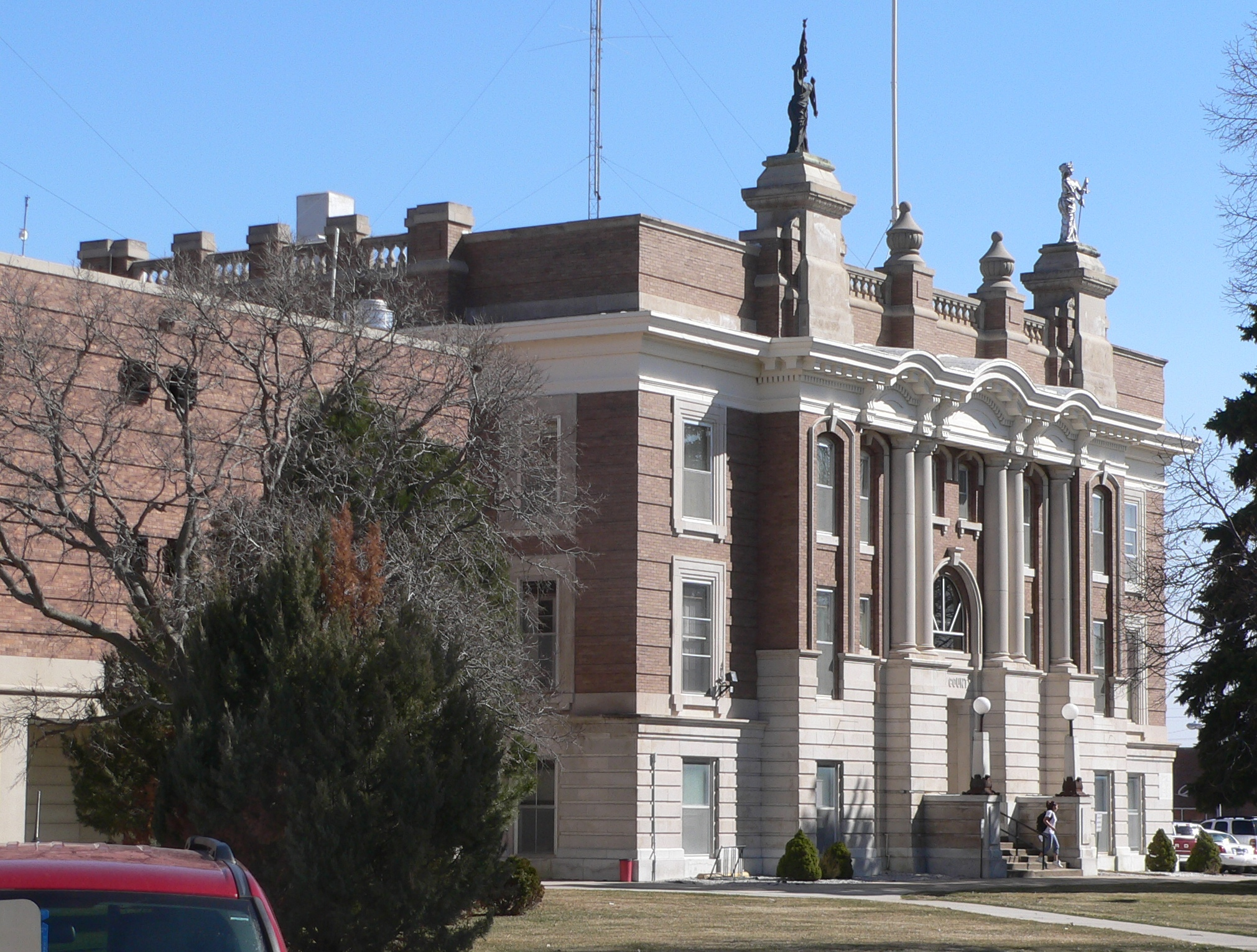
Dawson County Courthouse (Nebraska)

William F. Gernandt (September 1872 – September 26, 1943) was a German-born architect who was based in Nebraska. He designed a number of courthouses and other buildings that are listed on the National Register of Historic Places.

He was born in September 1872 in Germany, and in 1881 came with his family to the United States, specifically to Omaha, Nebraska. He was a builder in Marysville, Kansas, during 1903–1906, and apparently "later embellished this period, describing it as: 'he was able to leave for the east to study for his chosen profession....After a course of study in which he perfected himself in architecture, he came back to Nebraska and made his start in a new career at Fairbury.'" He then practiced as an architect in Fairbury, Nebraska during 1906 to 1912, and then in Omaha during 1912 to at least 1924. He and his wife moved to San Diego, California by 1926 and to Monrovia, California in 1937. He died there in 1943.

== Works ==
Gernandt's works include:

- The Anderson Building, 701 S. 24th St., 2243 Jones Omaha, NE, NRHP-listed
- Clay County Courthouse, Fairfield St. between Alexander and Brown Aves. Clay Center, NE, NRHP-listed
- Colman House, 501 Lavelle St. Diller, NE, NRHP-listed
- Dawson County Courthouse (1913–14), Washington St. between 7th and 8th Sts. Lexington, NE, built 1913–1914 in Beaux Arts style, NRHP-listed
- District No. 1 School of Jefferson County, Jct. of N. Second and Curtis Sts. Steele City, NE, NRHP-listed
- W.H. Faling House, 606 Parker St. Cambridge, NE, NRHP-listed
- Irwin Consolidated School, North Street Irwin, IA, built 1917, NRHP-listed
- Merrick County Courthouse, 18th St. between 15th and 16th Aves. Central City, NE, NRHP-listed
- Pawnee County Courthouse, 625 6th St. Pawnee City, NE, built 1911 in Classical Revival style, NRHP-listed
- Phelps County Courthouse, 5th Ave. between East and West Aves. Holdrege, NE, NRHP-listed
- Polk County Courthouse, Courthouse Sq. Osceola, NE, NRHP-listed
- Richardson County Courthouse, Courthouse Sq. Falls City, NE, NRHP-listed
- Third Sarpy County Courthouse, 3rd St. between Washington and Jefferson Sts. Papillion, Nebraska, NRHP-listed
- Valley County Courthouse, 16th St. between L and M Sts. Ord, NE, NRHP-listed
- Webster County Courthouse (1914), 225 W. 6th St. Red Cloud, NE, NRHP-listed
