= Helvey =

Helvey may refer to:

- Helvey, Missouri, an extinct town in Reynolds County
- Helvey, Nebraska, an unincorporated community in Jefferson County
