= People's State Bank (Diller, Nebraska) =

- U.S. National Register of Historic Places
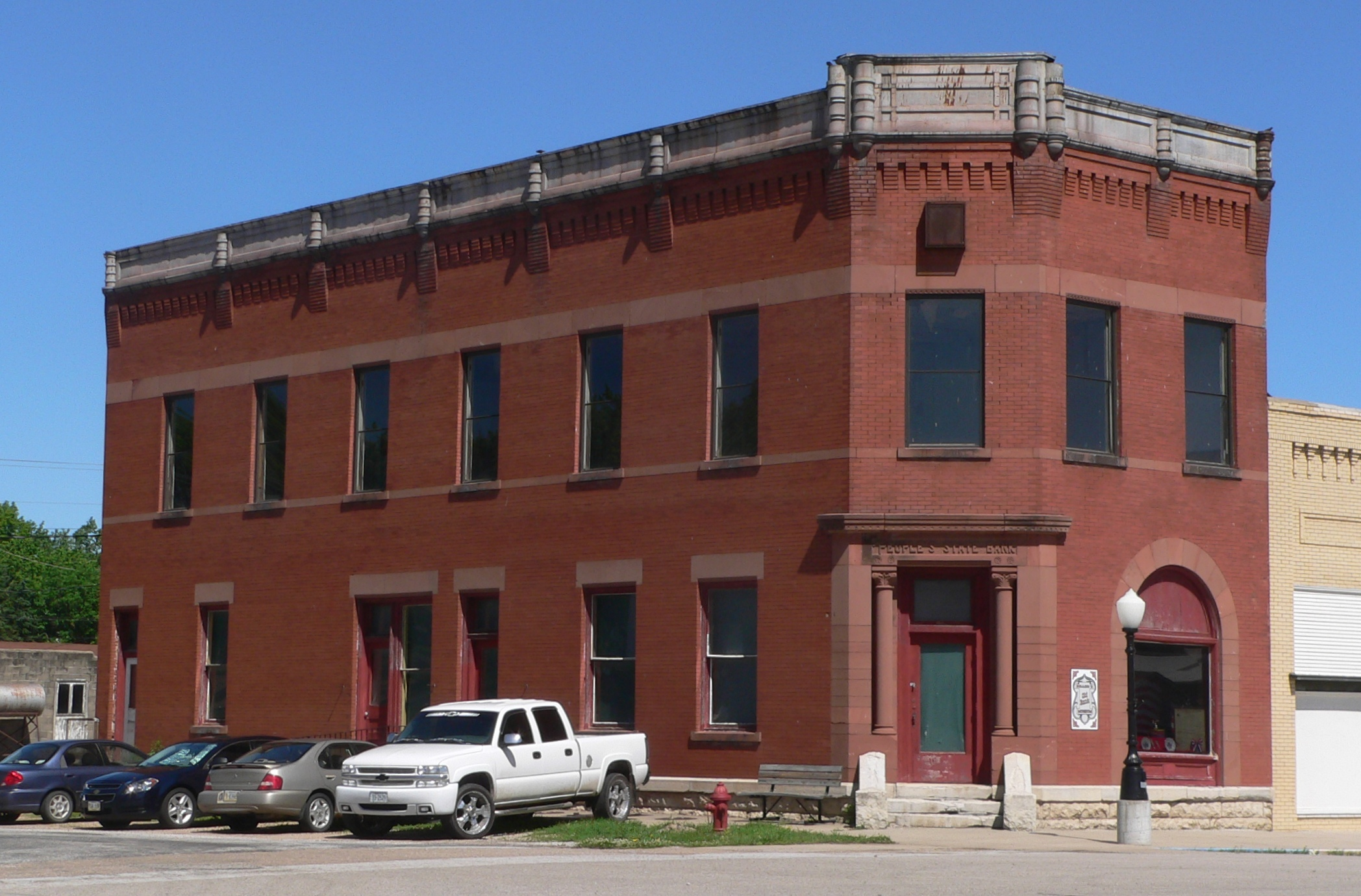
- The building in 2013

- Location within Nebraska Location within the United States
- Location: NE 103, Diller, Nebraska
- Coordinates: 40°06′34″N 96°56′07″W
- Area: less than one acre
- Architectural style: Renaissance Revival
- NRHP reference No.: 84000509
- Added to NRHP: December 13, 1984

The People's State Bank is a historic two-story building in Diller, Nebraska. It was built in 1892-1893 to house the People's State Bank, and it was designed in the Renaissance Revival architectural style. The interior was remodelled and a basement was built in 1910. The building was later acquired by the Diller Historical Society. It has been listed on the National Register of Historic Places since December 13, 1984.
