= John Champe =

John Champe may refer to:

- John Champe (soldier) (1752–1798), American Revolutionary War soldier and double agent
- John Leland Champe (1895–1978), American archaeologist
- John Champe High School, Loudoun County Public Schools district, Virginia
