= Colman House =

- U.S. National Register of Historic Places
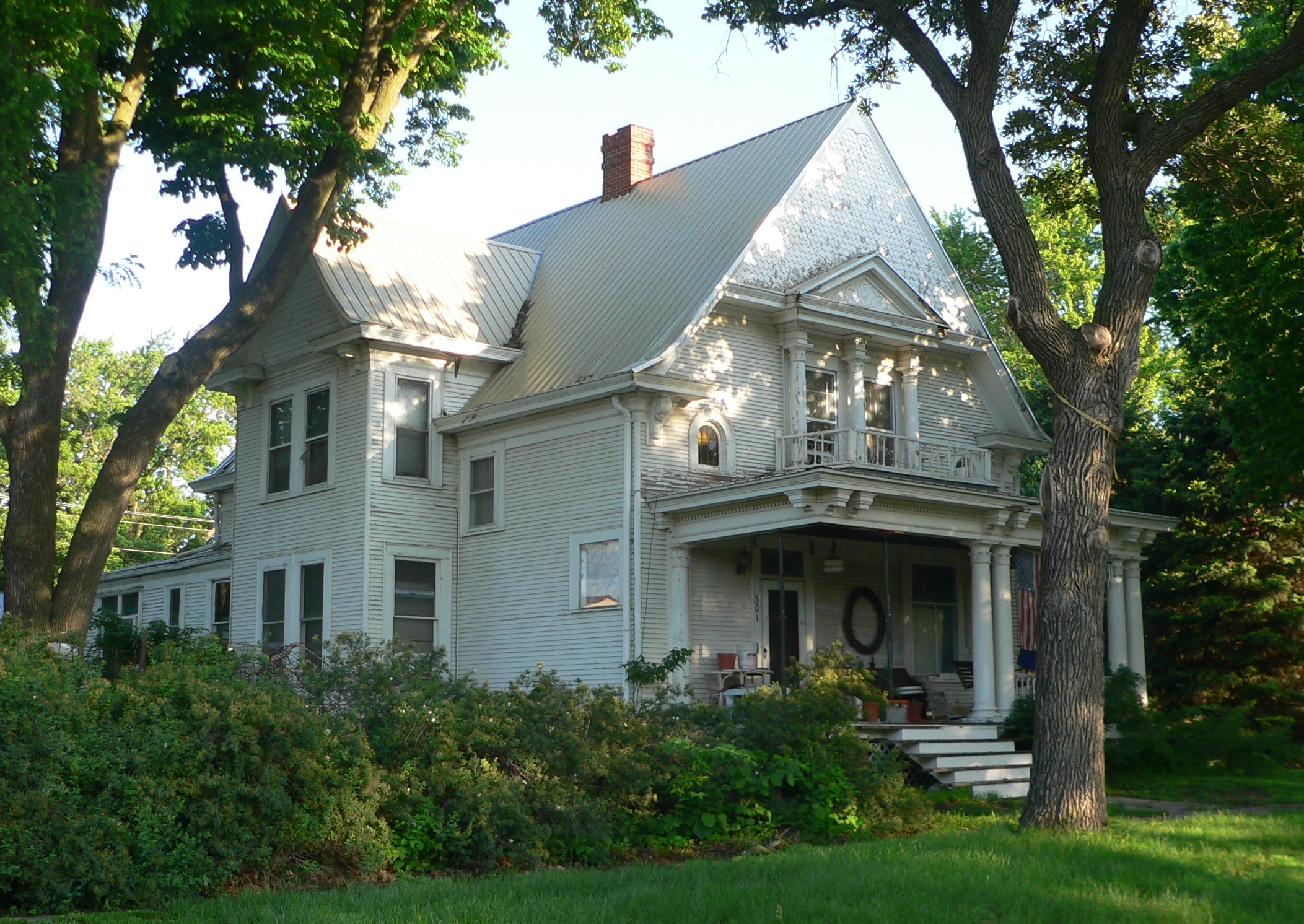
- The house in 2013

- Location within Nebraska Location within the United States
- Location: 501 Lavelle Street, Diller, Nebraska
- Coordinates: 40°06′29″N 96°56′11″W
- Area: less than one acre
- Built: 1908
- Architect: William F. Gernandt
- Architectural style: Queen Anne
- NRHP reference No.: 82003191
- Added to NRHP: June 25, 1982

The Colman House is a historic house in Diller, Nebraska. It was built in 1908-1909 for Andrew Colman and his wife, Lillie Osborne. It was designed by architect William F. Gernandt as a rectangular house with Queen Anne features. Colman was a landowner, and the president of the Citizens State Bank in Diller. He hired Charles Hansen and James Willer of Hansen & Willer to paint the walls and ceilings in 1912. The house has been listed on the National Register of Historic Places since June 25, 1982.
