= Bob Logan (baseball) =

American baseball player (1910–1978)

- Pitcher
- Born: February 10, 1910; Thompson, Nebraska
- Died: May 20, 1978 (aged 68); Indianapolis, Indiana
- Batted: Right Threw: Left

MLB debut
- April 18, 1935, for the Brooklyn Dodgers

Last MLB appearance
- September 20, 1945, for the Boston Braves

MLB statistics
- Win–loss record: 7–15
- Earned run average: 3.15
- Strikeouts: 67
- Stats at Baseball Reference

Teams
- Brooklyn Dodgers (1935); Detroit Tigers (1937); Chicago Cubs (1937–1938); Cincinnati Reds (1941); Boston Braves (1945)

Robert Dean Logan (February 10, 1910 – May 20, 1978) was a pitcher in Major League Baseball. The native of Thompson, Nebraska, made his professional baseball debut in 1930 with the Class D Fairbury Jeffersons of the Nebraska State League. He pitched for the Brooklyn Dodgers, Detroit Tigers, Chicago Cubs, Cincinnati Reds, and Boston Braves of Major League Baseball (MLB) between 1935 and 1945. His last professional action came in 1946 when he pitched for the Class AAA Indianapolis Indians of the American Association. He died in Indianapolis, Indiana in 1978.
