= Cambridge High School (Nebraska) =

Location
- 1003 Nelson St; Cambridge, (Furnas County), Nebraska 69022; United States
- Coordinates: 40.28324°N 100.17413°W

Information
- Type: Public school
- Teaching staff: 11.66 (FTE)
- Grades: 9–12
- Enrollment: 81 (2023–2024)
- Student to teacher ratio: 6.95
- Colors: Orange and Black
- Team name: Trojans
- Website: https://cpstrojans.org/

Cambridge High School is a public high school in Cambridge, Nebraska.

== Academics ==
55% of all students are proficient in math and 65% are proficient in reading. Cambridge Elementary and Middle School feed into Cambridge High School.

== Demographics ==
White	African American	Asian American	Latino	Two or More Races
92%	1%	0%	4%	0%
