= Richardson County Courthouse (Nebraska) =

- U.S. National Register of Historic Places
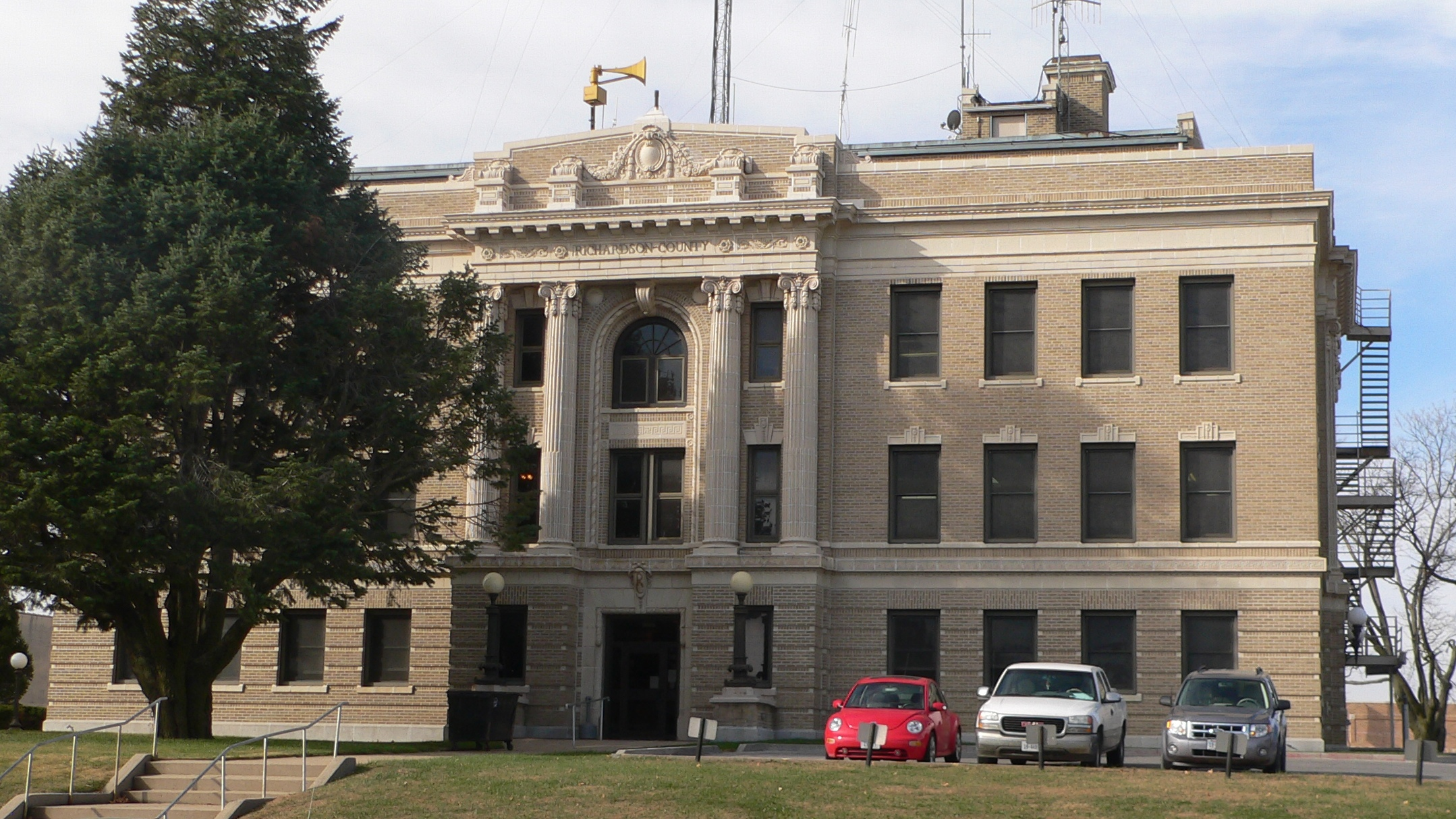
- The courthouse in 2010

- Location within Nebraska Location within the United States
- Location: Courthouse Square, Falls City, Nebraska
- Coordinates: 40°03′44″N 95°36′08″W
- Area: 1.8 acres (0.73 ha)
- Built: 1923
- Architect: William F. Gernandt
- Architectural style: Classical Revival
- MPS: County Courthouses of Nebraska MPS
- NRHP reference No.: 90000965
- Added to NRHP: July 5, 1990

The Richardson County Courthouse is a historic building in Falls City, Nebraska, and the courthouse of Richardson County, Nebraska. It was built in 1923–1925. It was designed by architect William F. Gernandt in the Classical Revival style, with "fluted engaged columns, a broad and prominent modillioned cornice, and a particularly fine two-story roundarched window.". Inside, there are two murals, including one about William Penn. The building has been listed on the National Register of Historic Places since July 5, 1990.
