= Anna C. Diller Opera House =

- Diller, Anna C., Opera House
- U.S. National Register of Historic Places
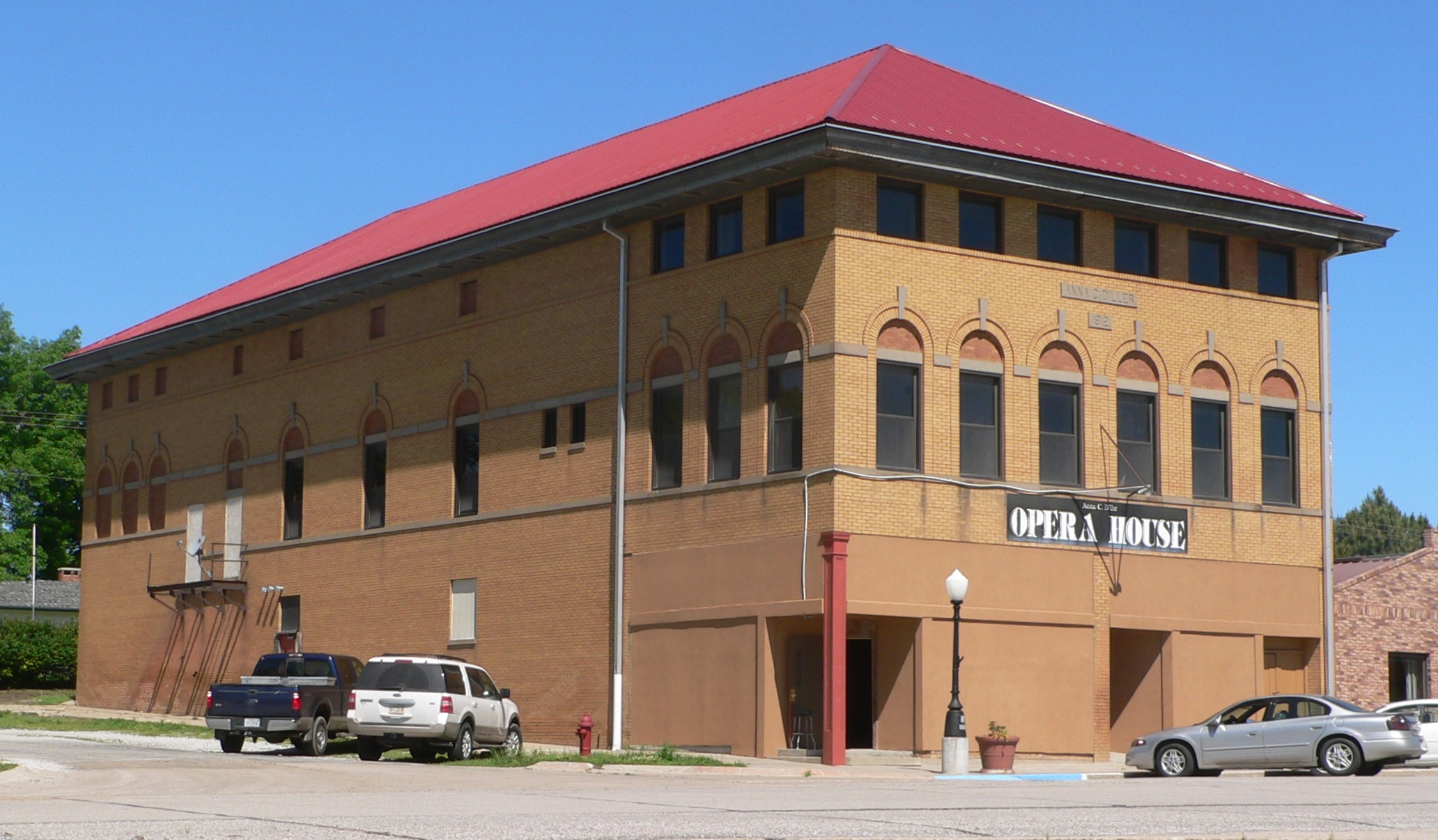
- The building in 2013

- Location within Nebraska Location within the United States
- Location: Commercial and Hilton, Diller, Nebraska
- Coordinates: 40°06′31″N 96°56′07″W
- Area: less than one acre
- Built: 1912
- Architectural style: Two-part commercial block
- MPS: Opera House Buildings in Nebraska 1867-1917 MPS
- NRHP reference No.: 88000932
- Added to NRHP: July 6, 1988

The Anna C. Diller Opera House is a historic three-story building in Diller, Nebraska. It was built as a two-part commercial block in 1912 thanks to a donation by Anne C. Diller, whose late husband William H. Oilier had co-founded Diller. Inside, there is a 42 feet wide by 67 feet long auditorium with a 20 feet wide by 14 feet high proscenium arch. The building has been listed on the National Register of Historic Places since July 6, 1988.
