= W. H. Faling House =

Historic house in Nebraska, United States

- U.S. National Register of Historic Places
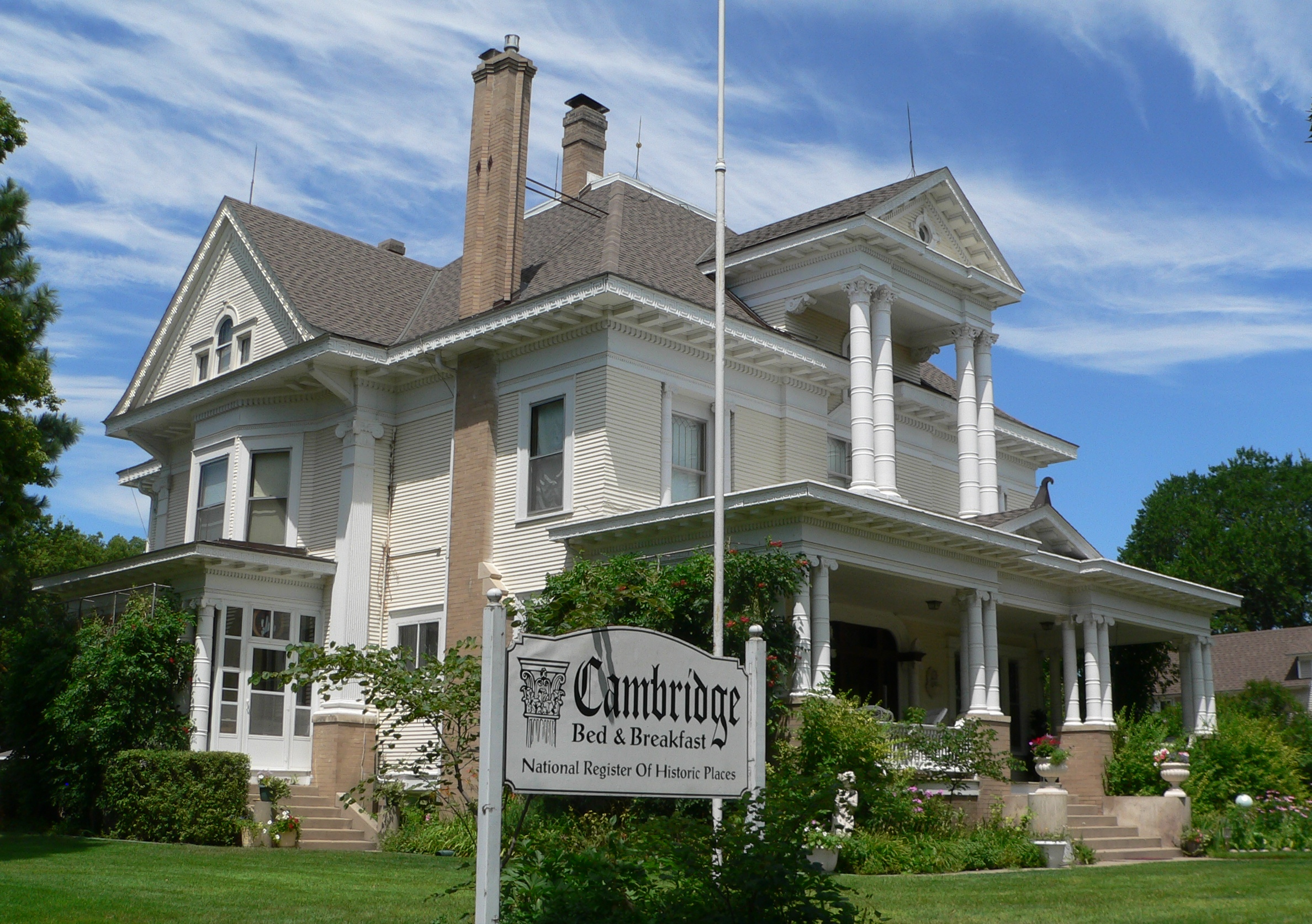

- Location within Nebraska Location within the United States
- Location: 606 Parker St., Cambridge, Nebraska
- Coordinates: 40°16′57″N 100°10′7″W
- Area: less than one acre
- Built: 1909
- Architect: W.F. Gernandt
- Architectural style: Classical Revival
- NRHP reference No.: 99001388
- Added to NRHP: November 22, 1999

The W. H. Faling House is a historic house located at 606 Parker St. in Cambridge, Nebraska. The house was constructed in 1909 by Nebraska architect William F. Gernandt. The home's Neoclassical design features a full height porch with groups of banded columns and a wide front door with symmetrical lights on the sides; the home is considered the best representation of Neoclassical architecture in Cambridge. W. H. Faling, a local merchant and the first chairman of Cambridge, owned and occupied the house until his death in 1933. The house now functions as a bed and breakfast.

The W. H. Faling House was added to the National Register of Historic Places on November 22, 1999.
