= Gladstone, Nebraska =

Unincorporated community in Nebraska, United States

- Unincorporated community
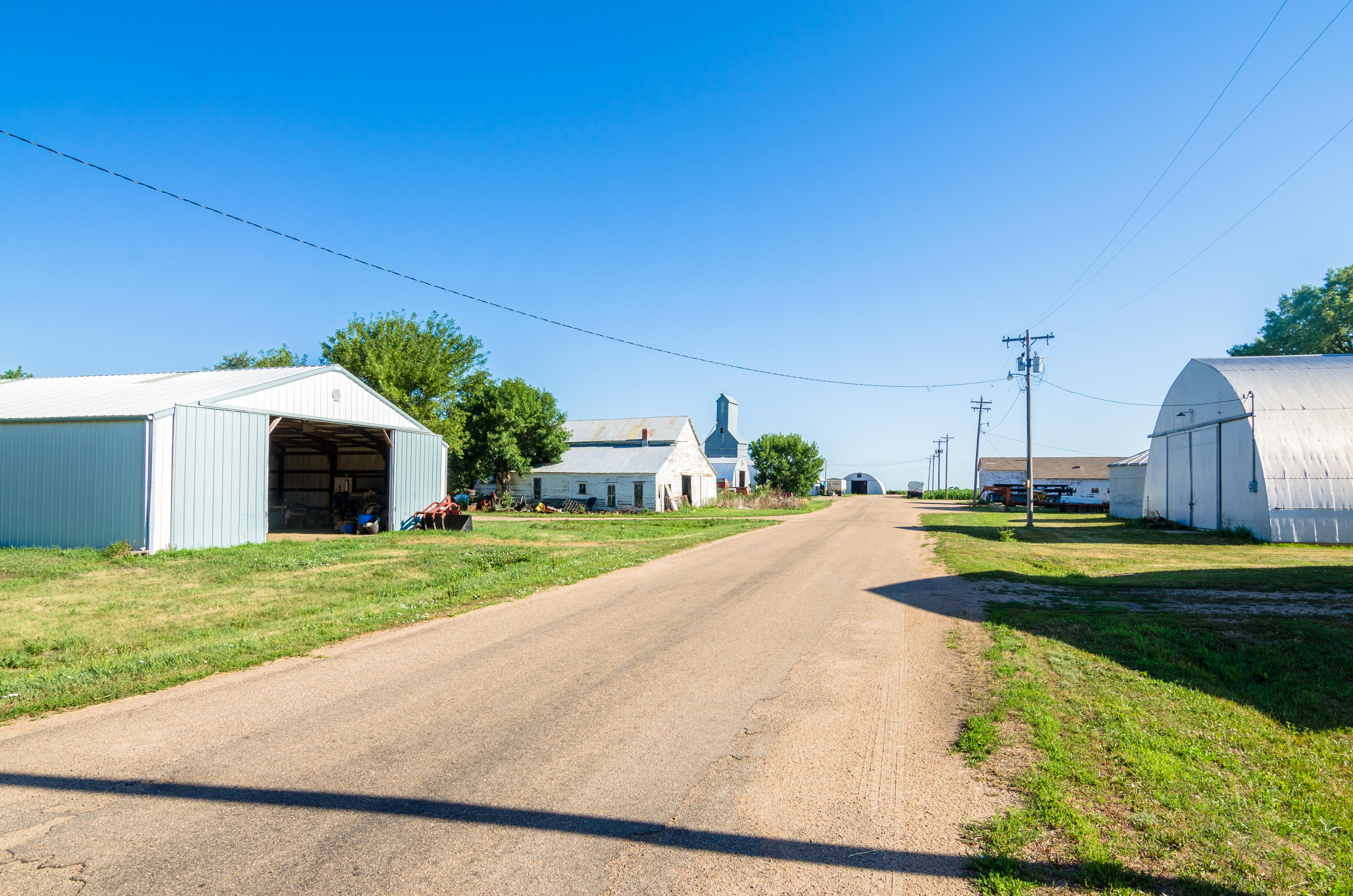
- Main Avenue in Gladstone

- Location within the state of Nebraska
- Coordinates: 40°09′35″N 97°18′29″W
- Country: United States
- State: Nebraska
- County: Jefferson
- Elevation: 1,542 ft (470 m)
- Time zone: UTC-6 (Central (CST))
  - Summer (DST): UTC-5 (CDT)
- ZIP code: 68352
- FIPS code: 31-18895
- GNIS feature ID: 829530

Gladstone is an unincorporated community in Jefferson County, Nebraska, United States.

== History ==
Gladstone was platted in 1886 when the Chicago, Kansas and Nebraska Railway was extended to that point. It was named for William Ewart Gladstone, the Prime Minister of the United Kingdom.
