= John Leland Champe =

American archaeologist (1895-1978)

- Born: April 27, 1895; Elwood, Nebraska
- Died: January 28, 1978 (aged 82)
- Education: University of Nebraska–Lincoln BA mathematics (1921), Columbia University PhD anthropology (1946)
- Occupation: Archeologist
- Known for: Archaeologist North American Plains

John Leland Champe (1895–1978) was an academic and archaeologist especially influential in the area of Great Plains archaeology.

== Early life and education ==
Champe was born in 1895 in Elwood, Nebraska to Owen E. Champe and Nina Trobee Champe. He had three siblings, Allen, Maurine (Moore) and Marjorie (Johnson). At the time of his death, Owen Champe worked for the National Assurance Company in Lincoln, Nebraska. John Champe attended high school in Friend, Nebraska in 1911. Champe served in the U.S. Army from 1917-1919 during World War I but did not serve overseas. He achieved the rank of 1st Lieutenant. He served his time at Fort Devens, Massachusetts. In 1921, he earned a BA from the University of Nebraska–Lincoln in mathematics. Before moving to New York to enter the Ph.D. program in anthropology at Columbia University in 1938, Champe had been vice president and a claims adjuster at a Nebraska insurance company. At the age of 43, Champe decided to pursue his PhD. While at Columbia, he studied under William Duncan Strong. He earned his Ph.D. from Columbia University in 1946 and became assistant professor of anthropology at the University of Nebraska–Lincoln in 1947. From 1953–1961, he was Chairman of the Department of Anthropology at the University of Nebraska–Lincoln.

== Career ==
Champe then worked as a professional archaeologist for the Works Progress Administration until 1940 when he returned to the University of Nebraska–Lincoln as an instructor in mathematics. The next year he helped establish the Laboratory of Anthropology at the university. Begun in 1931, the Plains Conference was postponed during World War II; Champe helped bring the conference back in 1947.

His "first major solo excavation" was at Big Village in the Northern Plains in what is now known as northeast Nebraska, where the Omaha were living. He also did excavations at Ash Hollow Cave near Lewellen, Nebraska and "he is credited with the definitive description of four distinct cultures which had occupied that site". "From 1954 to 1978, Champe acted as a consultant and expert witness on a number of court cases involving treaty disputes and land claims between various Native American tribes and the U.S. government. Among the tribes involved in these cases were the Yankton Sioux, the Omaha, the Pawnee, and numerous others."

== Publications ==
=== Selected articles ===
- Champe, John L. (1936). "The Sweetwater Culture Complex". In Chapters in Nebraska Archaeology, Part 3. E. H. Bell, ed. pp. 249–299. Lincoln: University of Nebraska Press.
- Champe, John L. (1938). "Explorations in Nebraska Archaeology". Nebraska History Magazine 18: 116–125.
- Champe, John L. (1954). (with Phil Holman) "Anthropology: Mirror of Man". Nebraska Alumnus 45: 4–7, 25.
- Lambert, Marjorie (1961). John Leland Champe: "A Founder of the Plains Conference". Plains Anthropologist 6(12–1): 73–75.
- Champe, John L.(1974). (with Franklin Fenenga) "Notes on the Pawnee". In American Indian Ethnohistory: Pawnee and Kansas (Kaw) Indians. David A. Horr, ed. pp. 23–169. New York: Garland Publishing.
- Champe, John L. (1976). (with Michael F. Foley) "An Historical Analysis of the Course of Dealings Between the United States and the Yankton Sioux Tribes, 1858–1900". Indian Land Claims Commission, Docket No. 332-c. Yankton Sioux Tribe v. United States of America: Plaintiffs Exhibit H-370. Washington, D.C.

== Personal life ==
In 1924, he married Flavia Waters, a ballet teacher and dancer, who had toured with the B. F. Keith Circuit before her marriage. Champe often played piano for Flavia's dance classes. Flavia traveled to sites with her husband and together they "recorded many native American dances especially the Matachines". On January 28, 1978, Champe died of a heart attack.
