= Helvey, Nebraska =

Unincorporated community in Nebraska, U.S.

Coordinates: 40°16′00″N 97°15′18″W

Helvey is an unincorporated community in Jefferson County, Nebraska, United States.

== History ==
A post office was established at Helvey in the 1890s. It was named for Thomas Helvey, a pioneer settler.
