= Powell, Nebraska =

Unincorporated community in Nebraska, U.S.

Coordinates: 40°13′15″N 97°17′05″W

Powell is an unincorporated community in Jefferson County, Nebraska, United States.

== History ==
Powell was laid out c. 1872 by the Powell family when it was certain that the railroad would be extended to that point. A post office was established at Powell in the 1880s.
