= Thompson, Nebraska =

Unincorporated community in Nebraska, U.S.

Coordinates: 40°04′06″N 97°15′31″W

Thompson is an unincorporated community in Jefferson County, Nebraska, United States.

== History ==
A post office was established at Thompson in the 1890s. The community was named after I. N. Thompson, the original owner of the town site.
