= IOOF Temple Building =

- U.S. National Register of Historic Places
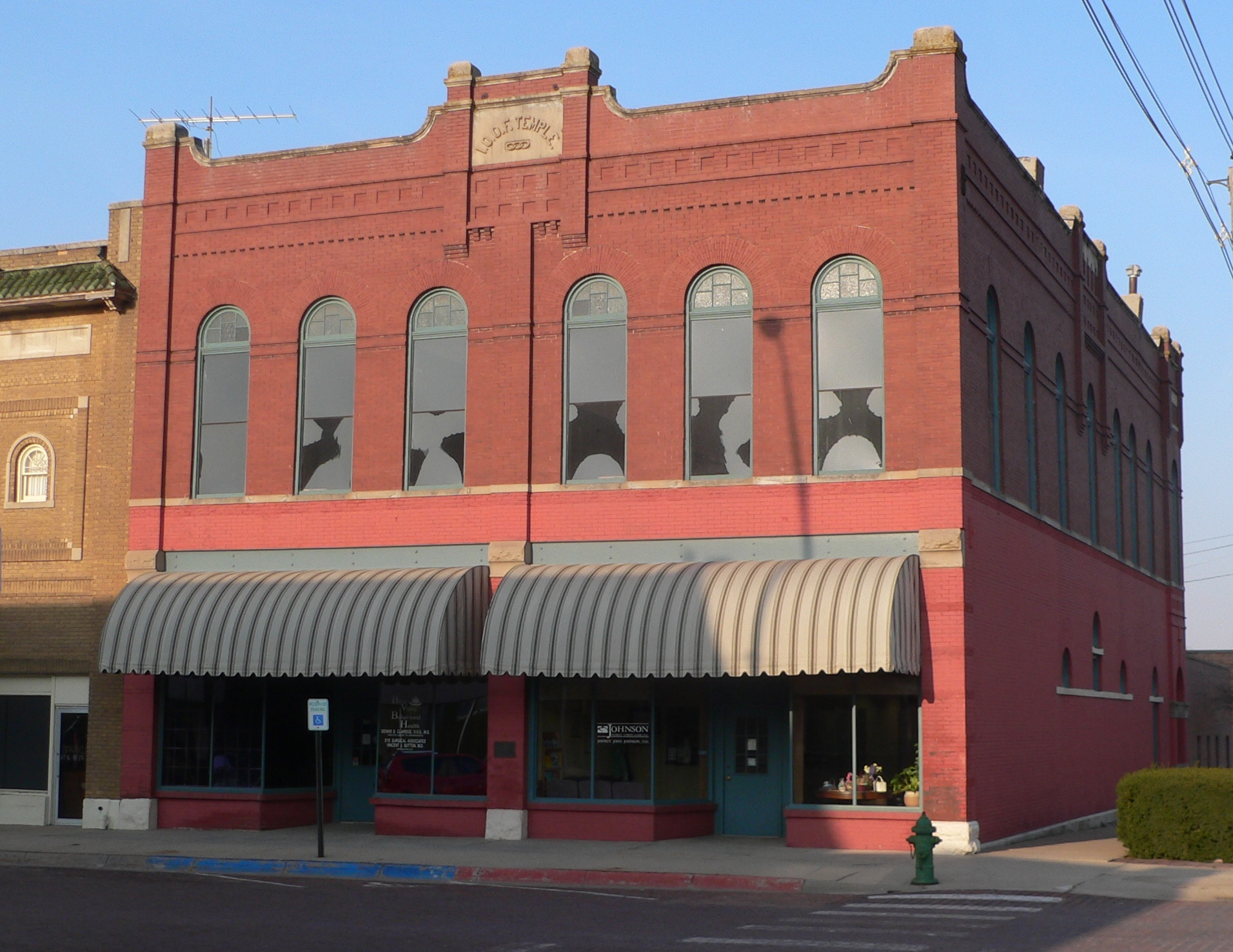
- View from the northeast

- Location within Nebraska Location within the United States
- Location: 523 E St., Fairbury, Nebraska
- Coordinates: 40°8′13.45″N 97°10′48.79″W
- Area: less than one acre
- Built: 1894
- Architect: William Clifton
- Architectural style: Romanesque Revival
- NRHP reference No.: 87000925
- Added to NRHP: June 15, 1987

The IOOF Temple Building in Fairbury, Nebraska was built during 1894–95. It served as the Odd Fellows Hall for Fairbury for almost 70 years. It was listed on the National Register of Historic Places in 1987. Its architect was William Clifton and it is a Romanesque Revival architecture-styled building.

It was deemed significant architecturally as "a well-preserved commercial example of the Romanesque Revival style of architecture." The style appeared in Nebraska during the late 1800s and early 1900s. This building's features of the style include round-arched window openings, brick corbelling, and wall and corner pilasters and stringcourses.
