= Webster County Courthouse (Nebraska) =

- U.S. National Register of Historic Places
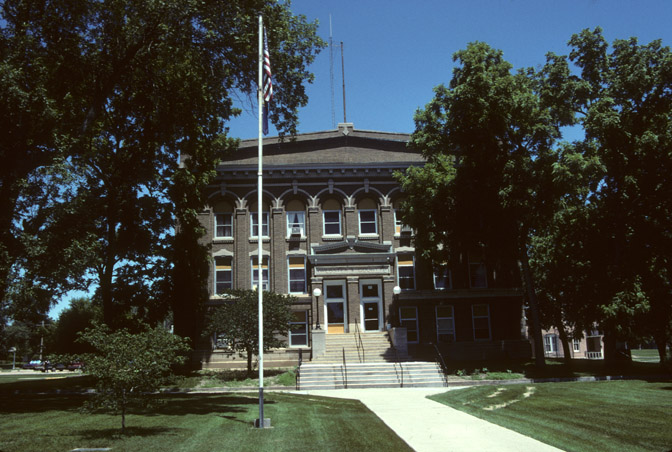

- Location within Nebraska Location within the United States
- Location: 225 W. 6th St., Red Cloud, Nebraska
- Coordinates: 40.091389°N 98.521111°W
- Area: 2 acres (0.81 ha)
- Built: 1883
- Built by: Towles Co.
- Architect: Gernandt, W.F.
- Architectural style: Late 19th And 20th Century Revivals, Second Renaissance Revival
- MPS: Willa Cather TR
- NRHP reference No.: 81000379
- Added to NRHP: March 5, 1981

The Webster County Courthouse is a "County Citadel" type courthouse with Second Renaissance Revival architecture that was built in 1914. It is one of ten Nebraska courthouses designed by William F. Gernandt. Its design is similar to Gernandt's for the Dawson County Courthouse, which was built during 1913–14. Both are listed on the National Register of Historic Places.

The courthouse is two stories tall with brownish brick (actually "Goldenrod Brick", from Omaha's Sunderland Brothers) walls, and with limestone trim. It sits on a raised basement made of rusticated brick and Bedford limestone.

Its NRHP nomination describes the main architectural feature of the courthouse:

The architect has expanded upon a form he used for his Dawson County Courthouse, stone-trimmed brick arcades between pilasters. For the Webster County Courthouse the arcades have become the dominant design feature, and arcaded pavilions occur on the south, east, and west facades. The round-arched brick arcades trimmed in stone spring from stone capitals of relatively simple brick pilasters. The arcade consists of eight arches on the main facade, and three on the sides where it projects more from the wall surface than does the main arcade. Tall and slightly arched parapets have a dentiled stone course that follows this arched shape. Below is a metal cornice featuring mutules with a row of dentils below. The forms further call attention to the arcades.

It was listed on the National Register in 1981. It was deemed significant for its architecture and for its role "as the focal point for the administration of local government and institutions in Webster County. It is a good example of public architecture in the community and contains good examples of design features and facilities distinctive to its design and use as a courthouse."

It is one of a number of NRHP-listed properties associated with Willa Cather.
