= Jefferson County, Nebraska =

County in Nebraska, United States

- County
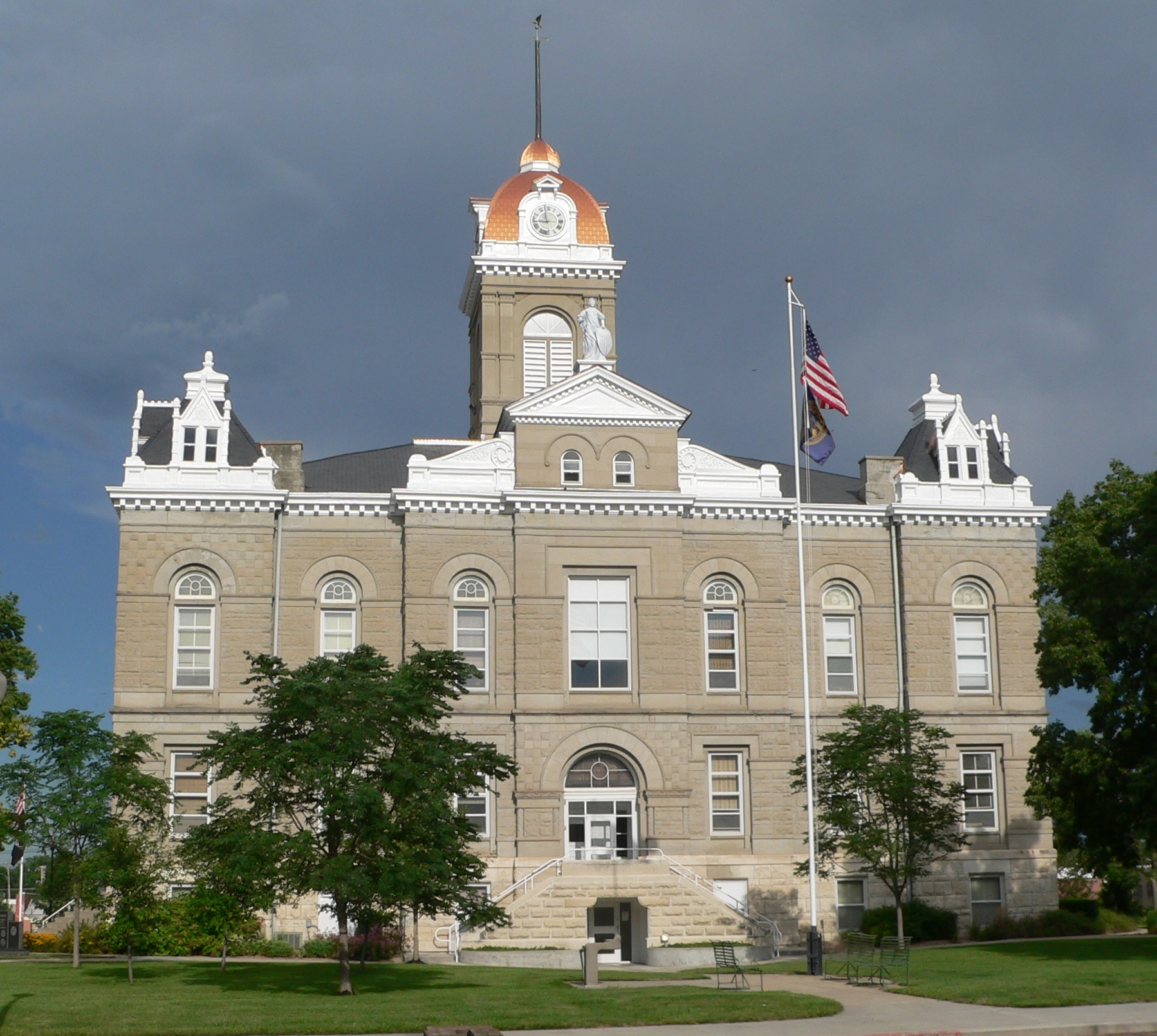
- Jefferson County Courthouse in Fairbury

- Location within the U.S. state of Nebraska
- Coordinates: 40°10′N 97°09′W
- Country: United States
- State: Nebraska
- Founded: January 26, 1856 (founded); 1864 (organized)
- Named for: Thomas Jefferson
- Seat: Fairbury
- Largest city: Fairbury

Area
  - Total: 576 sq mi (1,490 km^{2})
  - Land: 570 sq mi (1,500 km^{2})
  - Water: 5.5 sq mi (14 km^{2}) 1.0%

Population (2020)
  - Total: 7,240
  - Estimate (2025): 7,070 ▼
  - Density: 13/sq mi (4.9/km^{2})
- Time zone: UTC−6 (Central)
  - Summer (DST): UTC−5 (CDT)
- Congressional district: 3rd
- Website: jeffersoncounty.nebraska.gov

Jefferson County is a county in the U.S. state of Nebraska. As of the 2020 United States census, the population was 7,240. Its county seat is Fairbury. The county was named for Thomas Jefferson, third President of the United States of America. In the Nebraska license plate system, Jefferson County is represented by the prefix 33 (it had the thirty-third-largest number of vehicles registered in the county when the license plate system was established in 1922).

== History ==
Jefferson County was founded on January 26, 1856, and its governing structure was organized in 1864. It was named for Thomas Jefferson, third president of the United States.

In 2010, the Keystone-Cushing Pipeline (Phase II) was constructed south out of Jefferson County.

== Geography ==
Jefferson County lies on the south line of Nebraska. Its south boundary line abuts the north boundary line of the state of Kansas. The terrain of Jefferson County consists of low rolling hills, whose leveled tops are largely used for agriculture. The Little Blue River flows southeastward through the southwestern-middle of the county. The county has a total area of 576 square miles (1,490 km^{2}), of which 570 square miles (1,500 km^{2}) is land and 5.5 square miles (14 km^{2}) (1.0%) is water.

The county has the distinction of being the most “landlocked” county (or county equivalent) in the United States. A person must travel through 21 administrative divisions before reaching any ocean or the Great Lakes.

=== Major highways ===
- U.S. Highway 136
- Nebraska Highway 4
- Nebraska Highway 8
- Nebraska Highway 15
- Nebraska Highway 103

=== Protected areas ===
- Alexandria State Recreation Area
- Buckley State Recreation Area
- Rock Creek Station State Historical Park
- Rock Glen State Wildlife Management Area

=== Adjacent counties ===
- Saline County - north
- Gage County - east
- Washington County, Kansas - south
- Republic County, Kansas - southwest
- Thayer County - west
- Fillmore County - northwest

== Demographics ==
Historical population
Census	Pop.	Note	%±
1870	2,440		—
1880	8,096		231.8%
1890	14,850		83.4%
1900	15,196		2.3%
1910	16,852		10.9%
1920	16,140		−4.2%
1930	16,409		1.7%
1940	15,532		−5.3%
1950	13,623		−12.3%
1960	11,620		−14.7%
1970	10,436		−10.2%
1980	9,817		−5.9%
1990	8,759		−10.8%
2000	8,333		−4.9%
2010	7,547		−9.4%
2020	7,240		−4.1%
2025 (est.)	7,070	▼	−2.3%
US Decennial Census; 1790-1960 1900-1990; 1990-2000 2010-2013

=== 2020 census ===
As of the 2020 census, the county had a population of 7,240. The median age was 45.4 years. 22.0% of residents were under the age of 18 and 24.4% of residents were 65 years of age or older. For every 100 females there were 97.4 males, and for every 100 females age 18 and over there were 96.3 males age 18 and over.

The racial makeup of the county was 92.1% White, 0.3% Black or African American, 0.6% American Indian and Alaska Native, 0.2% Asian, 0.0% Native Hawaiian and Pacific Islander, 2.5% from some other race, and 4.3% from two or more races. Hispanic or Latino residents of any race comprised 5.0% of the population.

55.4% of residents lived in urban areas, while 44.6% lived in rural areas.

There were 3,179 households in the county, of which 24.4% had children under the age of 18 living with them and 23.7% had a female householder with no spouse or partner present. About 33.6% of all households were made up of individuals and 17.7% had someone living alone who was 65 years of age or older.

There were 3,665 housing units, of which 13.3% were vacant. Among occupied housing units, 73.7% were owner-occupied and 26.3% were renter-occupied. The homeowner vacancy rate was 2.4% and the rental vacancy rate was 10.4%.

=== 2000 census ===
As of the 2000 United States census, there were 8,333 people, 3,527 households, and 2,352 families in the county. The population density was 14 people per square mile (5.4 people/km^{2}). There were 3,942 housing units at an average density of 7 units per square mile (2.7/km^{2}). The racial makeup of the county was 98.42% White, 0.07% Black or African American, 0.38% Native American, 0.17% Asian, 0.04% Pacific Islander, 0.50% from other races, and 0.42% from two or more races. 1.31% of the population were Hispanic or Latino of any race.

There were 3,527 households, out of which 28.00% had children under the age of 18 living with them, 57.90% were married couples living together, 5.80% had a female householder with no husband present, and 33.30% were non-families. 29.60% of all households were made up of individuals, and 17.20% had someone living alone who was 65 years of age or older. The average household size was 2.32 and the average family size was 2.85.

The county population contained 23.30% under the age of 18, 6.10% from 18 to 24, 23.70% from 25 to 44, 24.30% from 45 to 64, and 22.70% who were 65 years of age or older. The median age was 43 years. For every 100 females there were 95.60 males. For every 100 females age 18 and over, there were 91.80 males.

The median income for a household in the county was $32,629, and the median income for a family was $40,747. Males had a median income of $26,929 versus $18,594 for females. The per capita income for the county was $18,380. About 8.00% of families and 8.90% of the population were below the poverty line, including 10.20% of those under age 18 and 8.70% of those age 65 or over.

== Communities ==
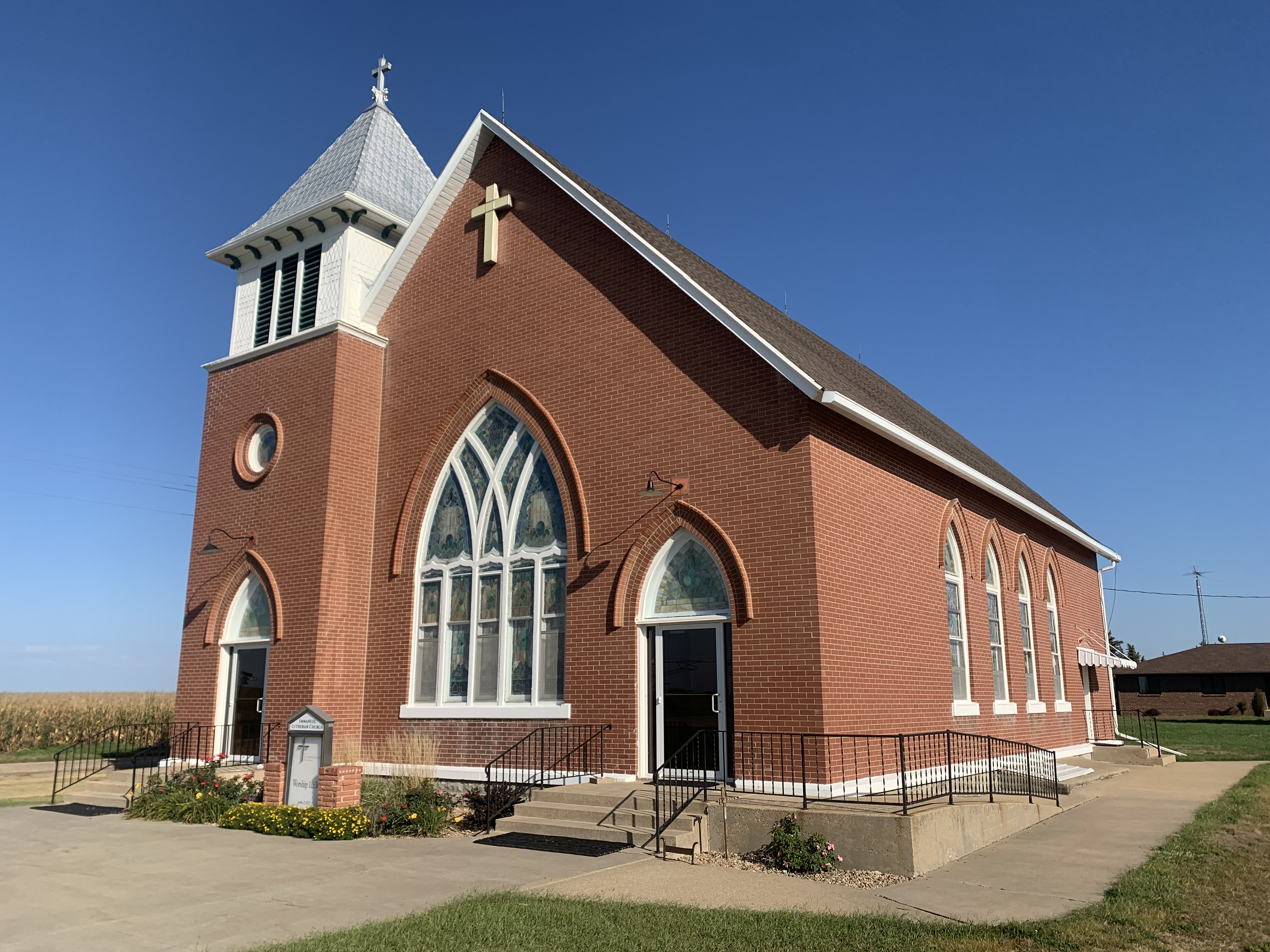
Immanuel Church in Washington Precinct of Jefferson County, Nebraska

=== City ===
- Fairbury (county seat)

=== Villages ===
- Daykin
- Diller
- Endicott
- Harbine
- Jansen
- Plymouth
- Reynolds
- Steele City

=== Unincorporated communities ===
- Gladstone
- Helvey
- Powell
- Thompson

== Politics ==
Jefferson County is strongly Republican, having only backed the Democratic Party presidential candidate five times since 1900.

United States presidential election results for Jefferson County, Nebraska
Year	Republican		Democratic		Third party(ies)	
Year	No.	%	No.	%	No.	%
1900	1,862	53.09%	1,587	45.25%	58	1.65%
1904	2,067	66.63%	659	21.24%	376	12.12%
1908	1,941	50.49%	1,787	46.49%	116	3.02%
1912	655	18.58%	1,396	39.60%	1,474	41.82%
1916	1,813	46.85%	1,841	47.57%	216	5.58%
1920	3,488	67.94%	1,408	27.43%	238	4.64%
1924	2,752	48.12%	1,824	31.89%	1,143	19.99%
1928	4,359	65.96%	2,193	33.18%	57	0.86%
1932	2,453	33.14%	4,819	65.10%	130	1.76%
1936	3,048	39.98%	4,526	59.37%	50	0.66%
1940	4,980	64.35%	2,759	35.65%	0	0.00%
1944	4,257	66.06%	2,187	33.94%	0	0.00%
1948	3,352	60.29%	2,208	39.71%	0	0.00%
1952	4,941	76.12%	1,550	23.88%	0	0.00%
1956	4,267	71.25%	1,722	28.75%	0	0.00%
1960	4,047	68.11%	1,895	31.89%	0	0.00%
1964	2,275	44.79%	2,804	55.21%	0	0.00%
1968	2,793	60.23%	1,572	33.90%	272	5.87%
1972	3,008	67.08%	1,476	32.92%	0	0.00%
1976	2,628	54.88%	2,068	43.18%	93	1.94%
1980	3,090	67.59%	1,125	24.61%	357	7.81%
1984	3,116	68.89%	1,367	30.22%	40	0.88%
1988	2,471	57.16%	1,819	42.08%	33	0.76%
1992	1,783	39.70%	1,506	33.53%	1,202	26.76%
1996	1,979	49.17%	1,520	37.76%	526	13.07%
2000	2,351	61.11%	1,361	35.38%	135	3.51%
2004	2,600	64.82%	1,352	33.71%	59	1.47%
2008	2,103	56.88%	1,520	41.11%	74	2.00%
2012	2,166	62.86%	1,195	34.68%	85	2.47%
2016	2,399	68.66%	837	23.96%	258	7.38%
2020	2,616	70.13%	1,016	27.24%	98	2.63%
2024	2,614	71.83%	968	26.60%	57	1.57%

== See also ==
- National Register of Historic Places listings in Jefferson County, Nebraska
- Oto Reservation
