= Clay County Courthouse (Nebraska) =

- U.S. National Register of Historic Places
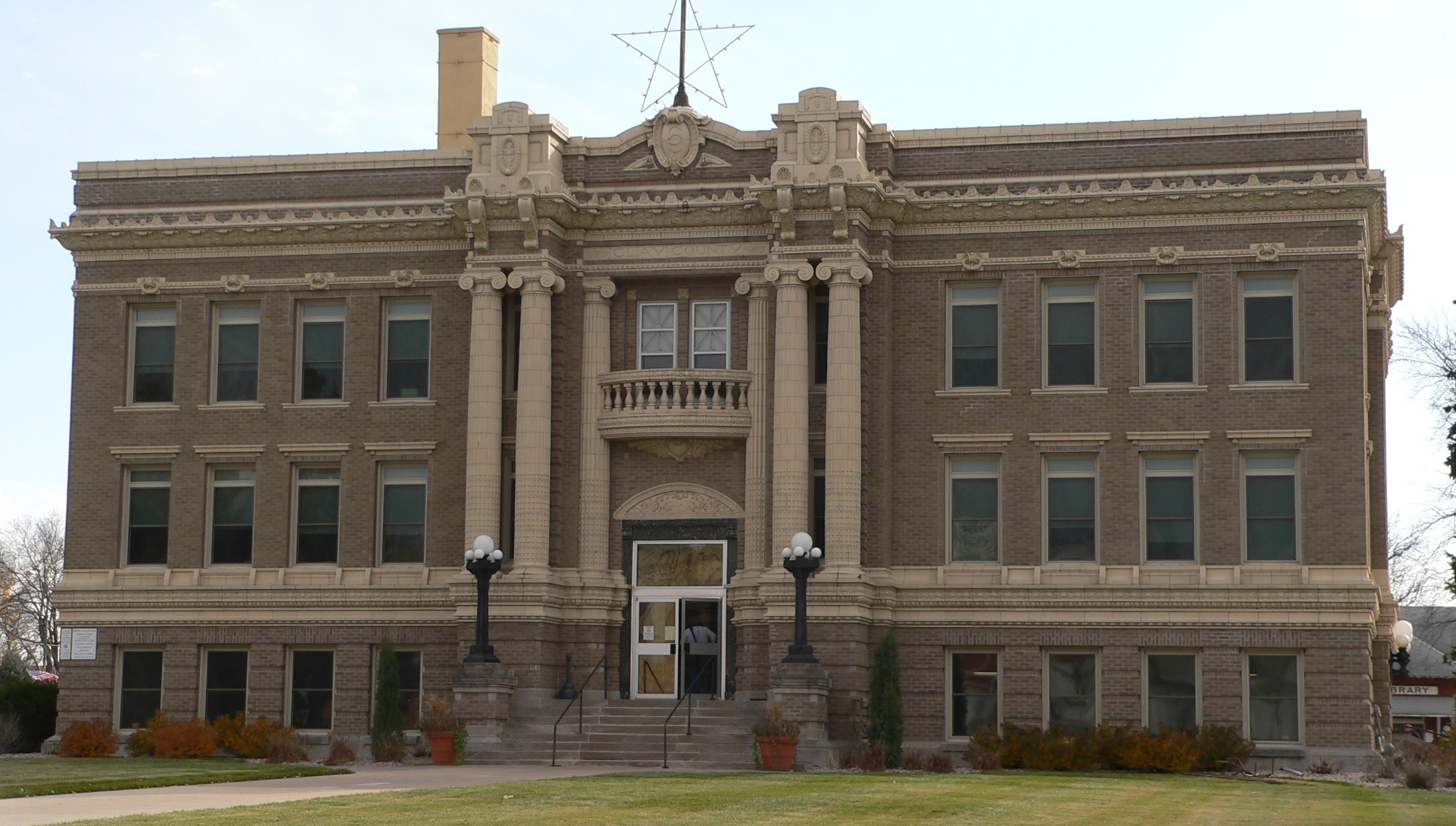
- View from the north

- Location within Nebraska Location within the United States
- Location: Fairfield St. between Alexander and Brown Aves., Clay Center, Nebraska
- Coordinates: 40°31′16″N 98°3′16″W
- Area: 2 acres (0.81 ha)
- Built: 1917
- Architect: William F. Gernandt
- Architectural style: Beaux Arts
- MPS: County Courthouses of Nebraska MPS
- NRHP reference No.: 89002240
- Added to NRHP: January 10, 1990

The Clay County Courthouse in Clay Center, Nebraska, was built during 1917–1919. It was designed by architect William F. Gernandt in Beaux Arts style, and is an "exceptionally fine" example of the ten Nebraska courthouses that he designed. It is also an "excellent" example of the County Citadel type of county courthouse.

The building was listed on the U.S. National Register of Historic Places in 1990.
