= Helvey, Missouri =

Extinct hamlet in Missouri, U.S.

Coordinates: 37.1253275°N 90.8712342°W

Helvey is an extinct town in Reynolds County, in the U.S. state of Missouri.

A post office called Helvey was established in 1915, and remained in operation until 1917. The community has the name of Cyrus and G. B. Helvey, early settlers.
