= Fairbury station =

Rail depot

Fairbury
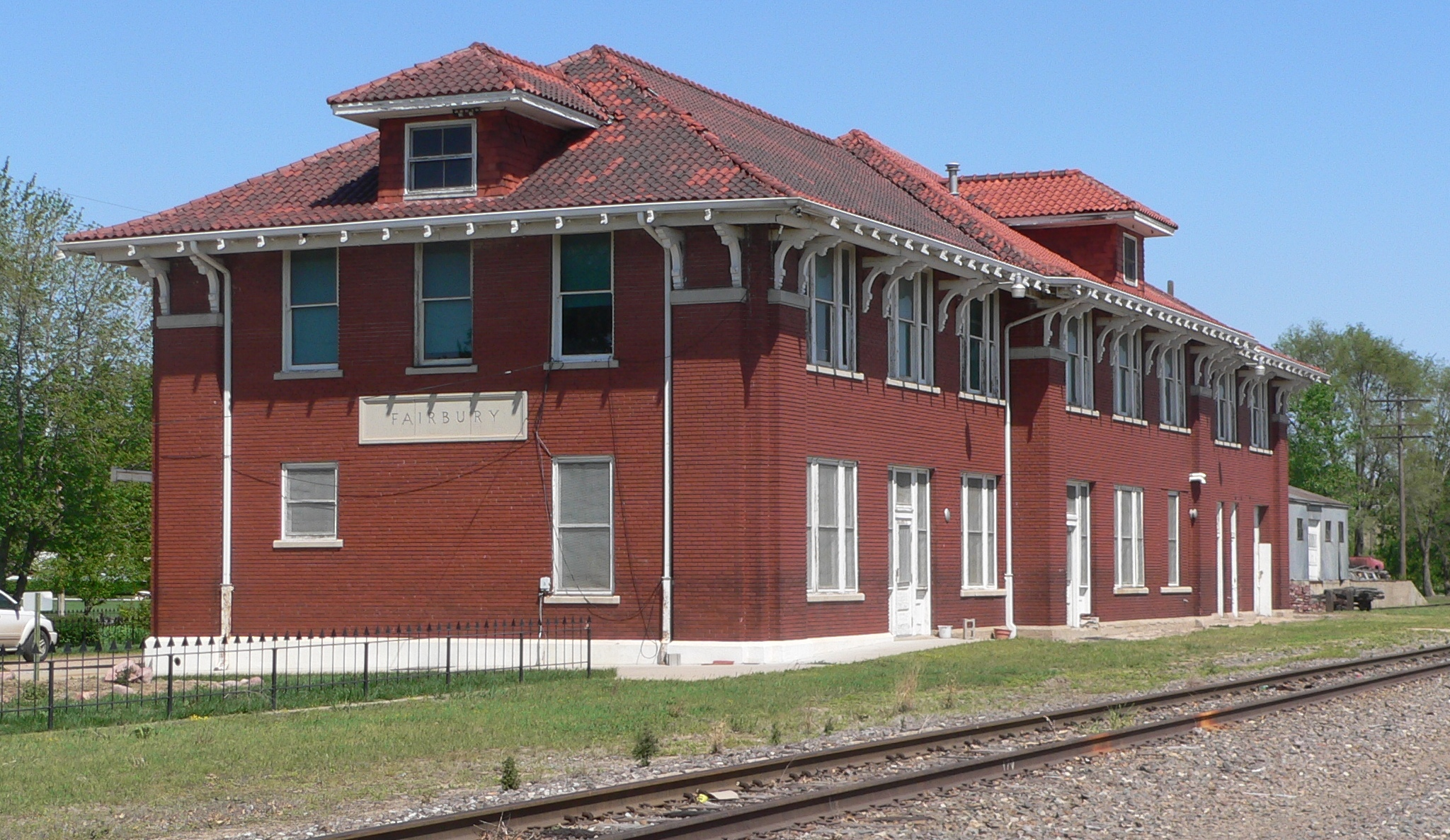
- Fairbury station (2012)

General information
- Location: 910 Bacon Road, Fairbury, Nebraska 68352
- System: Former Rock Island Line passenger rail station

History
- Opened: February 10, 1914
- Closed: October 15, 1966

Services
Preceding station	Chicago, Rock Island and Pacific Railroad	Following station
Thompson toward Colorado Springs	Main Line	Jansen toward Chicago
- Fairbury Rock Island Depot and Freight House
- U.S. National Register of Historic Places
- Location within Nebraska
- Location: 910 Bacon Road, Fairbury, Nebraska
- Coordinates: 40°07′57″N 97°10′26″W
- Area: 0.5 acres (0.20 ha)
- Built: 1913
- Architect: T.J. Leak & Co.
- Architectural style: Renaissance Revival
- NRHP reference No.: 96000681
- Added to NRHP: June 21, 1996
Location

The Fairbury Rock Island Depot and Freight House in Fairbury, Nebraska is a historic railroad station and freight house complex which served trains of the Chicago, Rock Island and Pacific Railroad (Rock Island Line). The Renaissance Revival passenger station began construction in 1913 and had a grand opening on February 10, 1914. The second story of the station housed the Western Division Headquarters for the railroad. The passenger station served trains including the Rock Island's Rocky Mountain Rocket from Chicago to Colorado Springs and Denver. When the Rocky Mountain Rocket was terminated on October 15, 1966, the Rock Island's passenger service was discontinued at Fairbury. The division offices had been relocated a year earlier. The adjacent metal freight house was constructed in 1940 and served the railroad until 1963.

Both buildings were listed on the National Register of Historic Places on June 21, 1996. The passenger station is now occupied by a museum.
