= Gosper County Courthouse =

- U.S. National Register of Historic Places
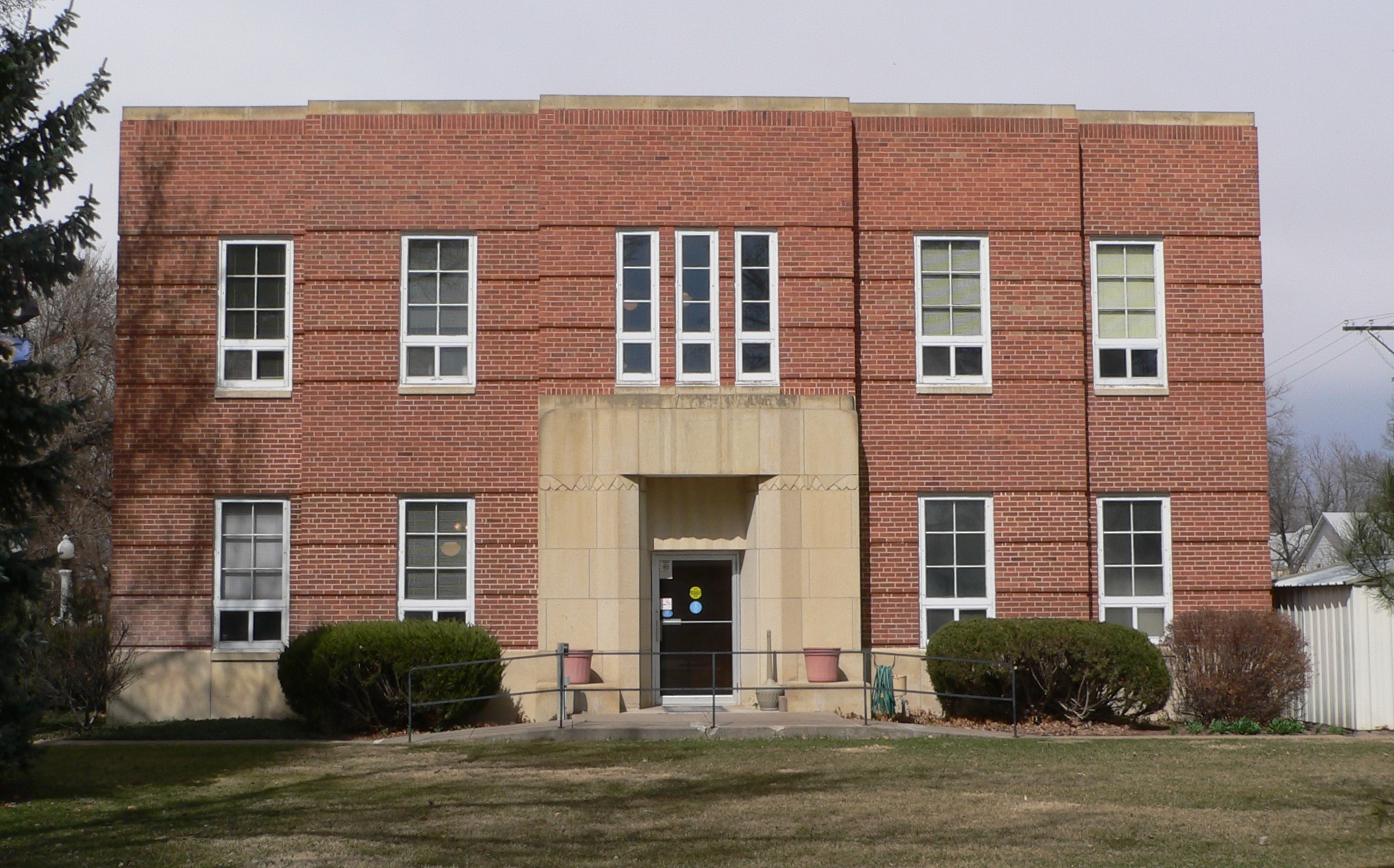

- Location within Nebraska Location within the United States
- Location: 507 Smith Ave., Elwood, Nebraska
- Coordinates: 40°35′16″N 99°51′38″W
- Area: 1.1 acres (0.45 ha)
- Built: 1939
- Architect: McClure & Walker
- Architectural style: Art Deco
- MPS: County Courthouses of Nebraska MPS
- NRHP reference No.: 90000961
- Added to NRHP: July 5, 1990

The Gosper County Courthouse, at 507 Smith Ave. in Elwood, Nebraska, was built in 1939. It was designed by architects McClure & Walker with Art Deco style.

It was listed on the National Register of Historic Places in 1990. It was deemed historically significant for its architecture and for its association with politics and local government; it was one of seven Nebraska courthouses built by New Deal programs.
