= Pawnee County Courthouse (Nebraska) =

- U.S. National Register of Historic Places
- U.S. Historic district
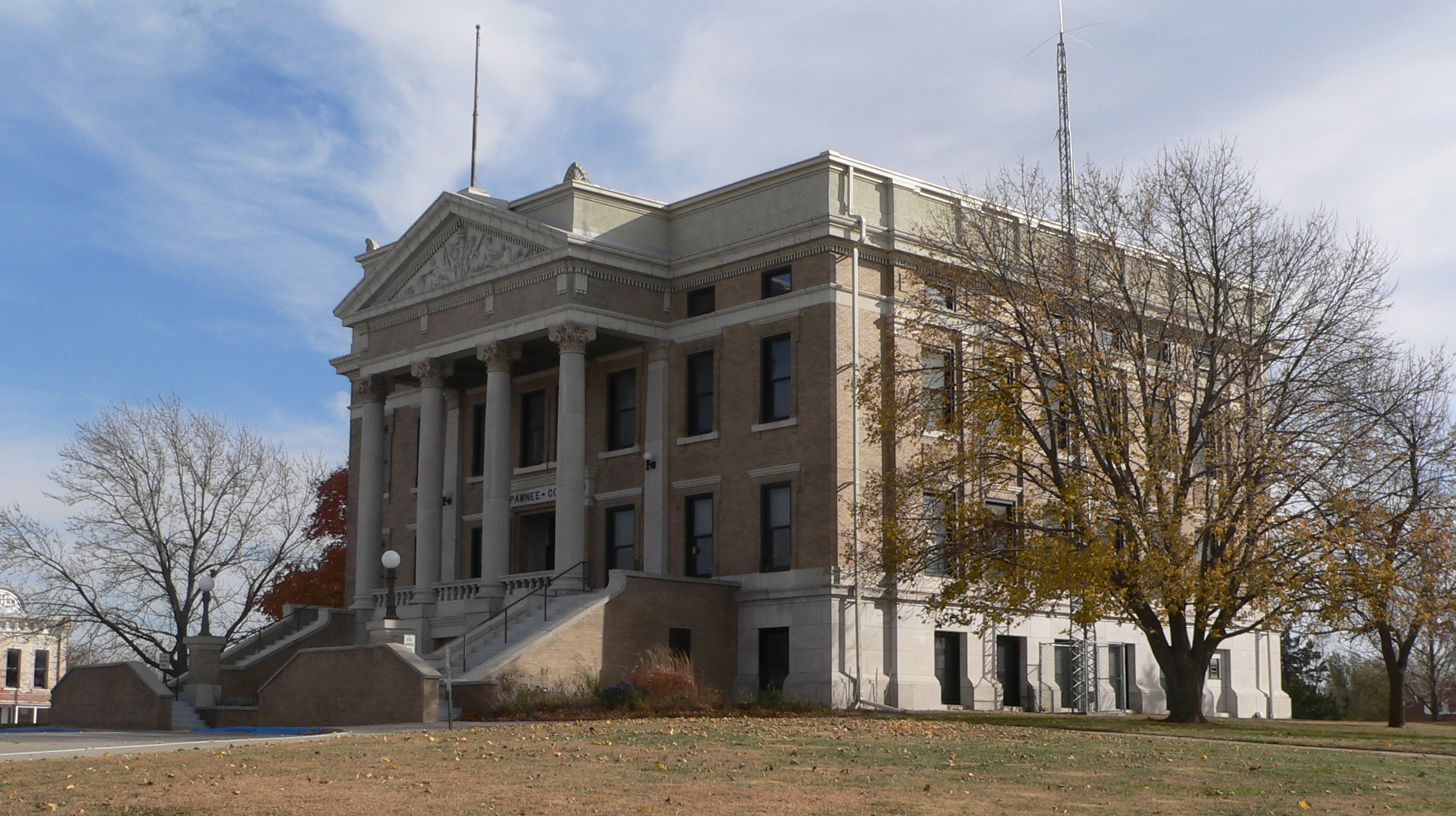

- Location within Nebraska Location within the United States
- Location: 625 6th St., Pawnee City, Nebraska
- Coordinates: 40°6′29″N 96°9′12″W
- Built: 1911
- Architect: Gernandt, William F.
- Architectural style: Classical Revival
- MPS: County Courthouses of Nebraska MPS
- NRHP reference No.: 89002232
- Added to NRHP: January 10, 1990

Pawnee County Courthouse in Pawnee City, Nebraska was built in 1911. It was designed by architect William F. Gernandt in Classical Revival style. It was listed on the National Register of Historic Places in 1990.

The tan brick building has three stories over an ashlar limestone raised basement and is 67 by 78 feet (20 m × 24 m) in plan. The third story is partly hidden behind a brick parapet; windows poke through the entablature; the parapet and entablature are relatively unadorned.

Its more elaborate and prominent feature is a monumental four-column entry portico on its north, front facade. The four columns have complex capitals, and there are squared pilasters behind the end columns. The portico has a pair of stairways leading up to it, and a pediment above including figurative sculpture. The pedimental sculpture is described in its 1989 NRHP nomination as "A rather delicate feature". It is described as having:

terra cotta allegorical figures and symbols located within the triangle of the pediment. Two bearded men in togas holding a shovel and a pitchfork are flanked by women with baskets of apples and other produce and symbolize agriculture and the fertility of the county. The centered torch likely refers to the enduring nature of county government and democratic ideals.

== See also ==
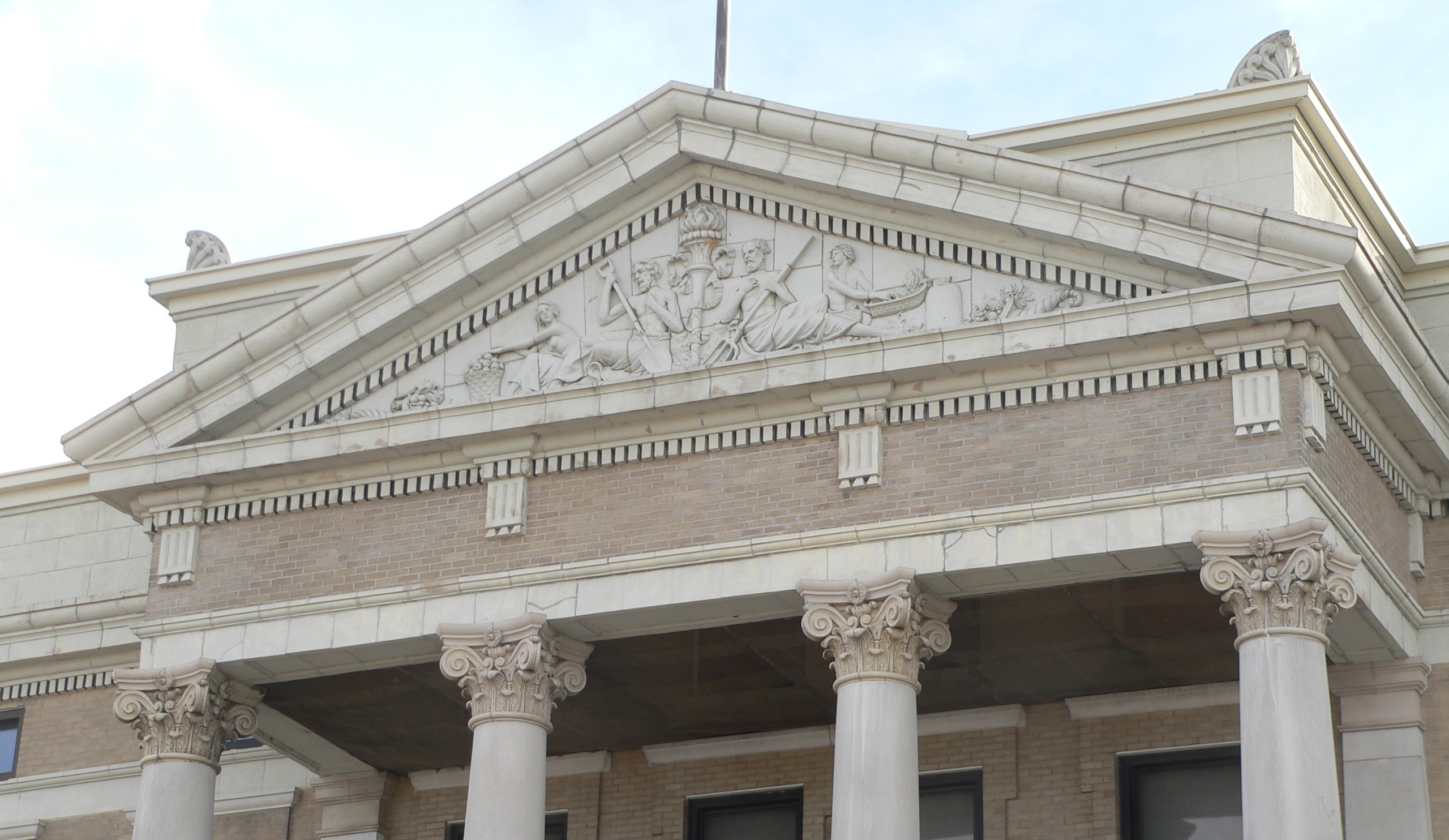

- Pedimental sculptures in the United States
