= Valley County Courthouse (Nebraska) =

- U.S. National Register of Historic Places
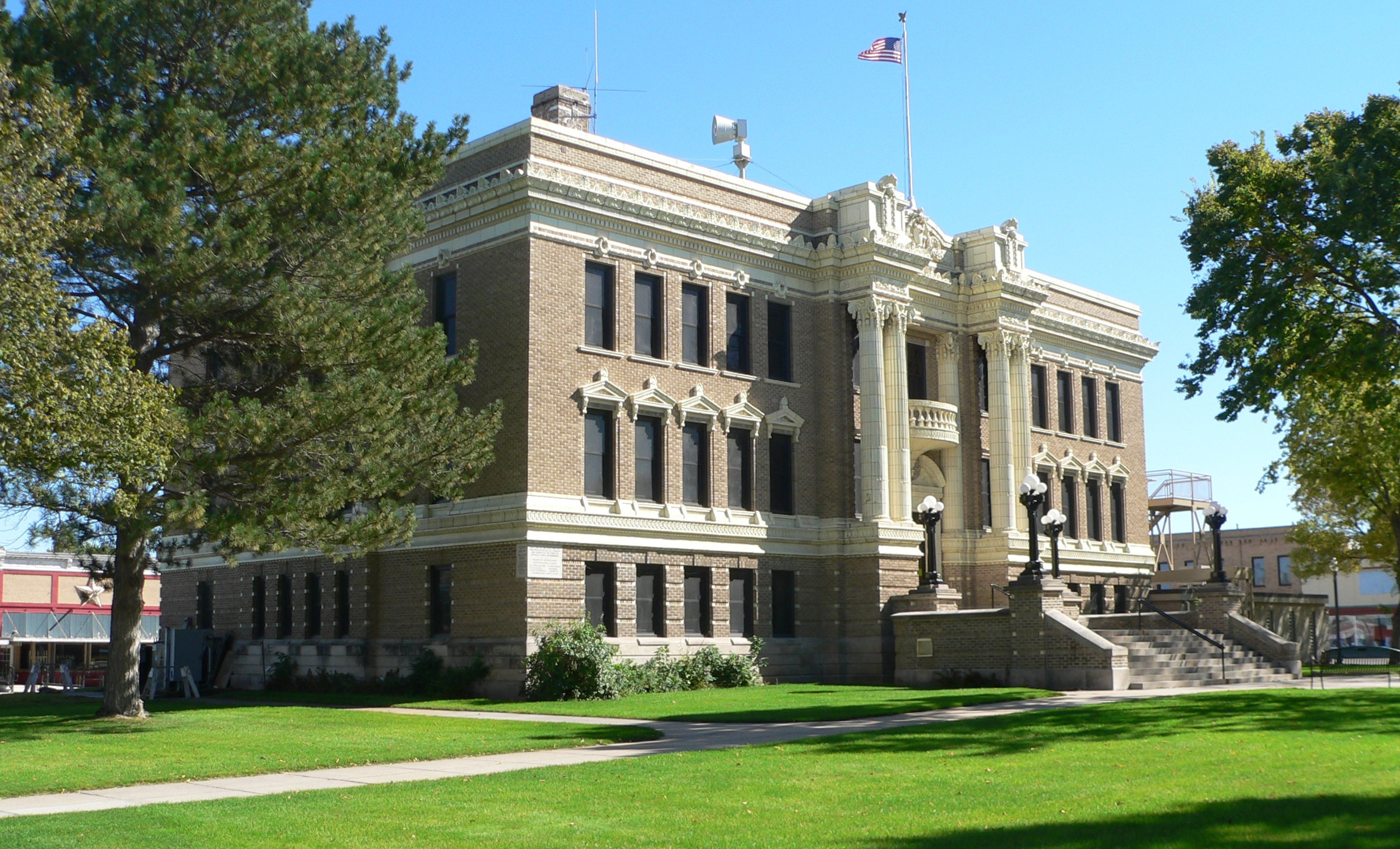

- Location within Nebraska Location within the United States
- Location: 16th St. between L and M Sts., Ord, Nebraska
- Coordinates: 41°36′9″N 98°55′41″W
- Area: 1.4 acres (0.57 ha)
- Built: 1919-1921
- Architect: William F. Gernandt
- Architectural style: Beaux Arts
- MPS: County Courthouses of Nebraska MPS
- NRHP reference No.: 89002235
- Added to NRHP: January 10, 1990

The Valley County Courthouse, on 16th St. between L and M Sts. in Ord, Nebraska, United States, is a Beaux Arts-style courthouse designed by architect William F. Gernandt and built in 1919. It was listed on the National Register of Historic Places in 1990.

It is a two-story building upon a full raised basement and has a prominent, ornamented entry pavilion on its west facade. It is decorated with elaborate cream-colored terra cotta trim which contrasts with the grey-tan brick. It has Ionic columns.
