= Cambridge, Nebraska =

- City
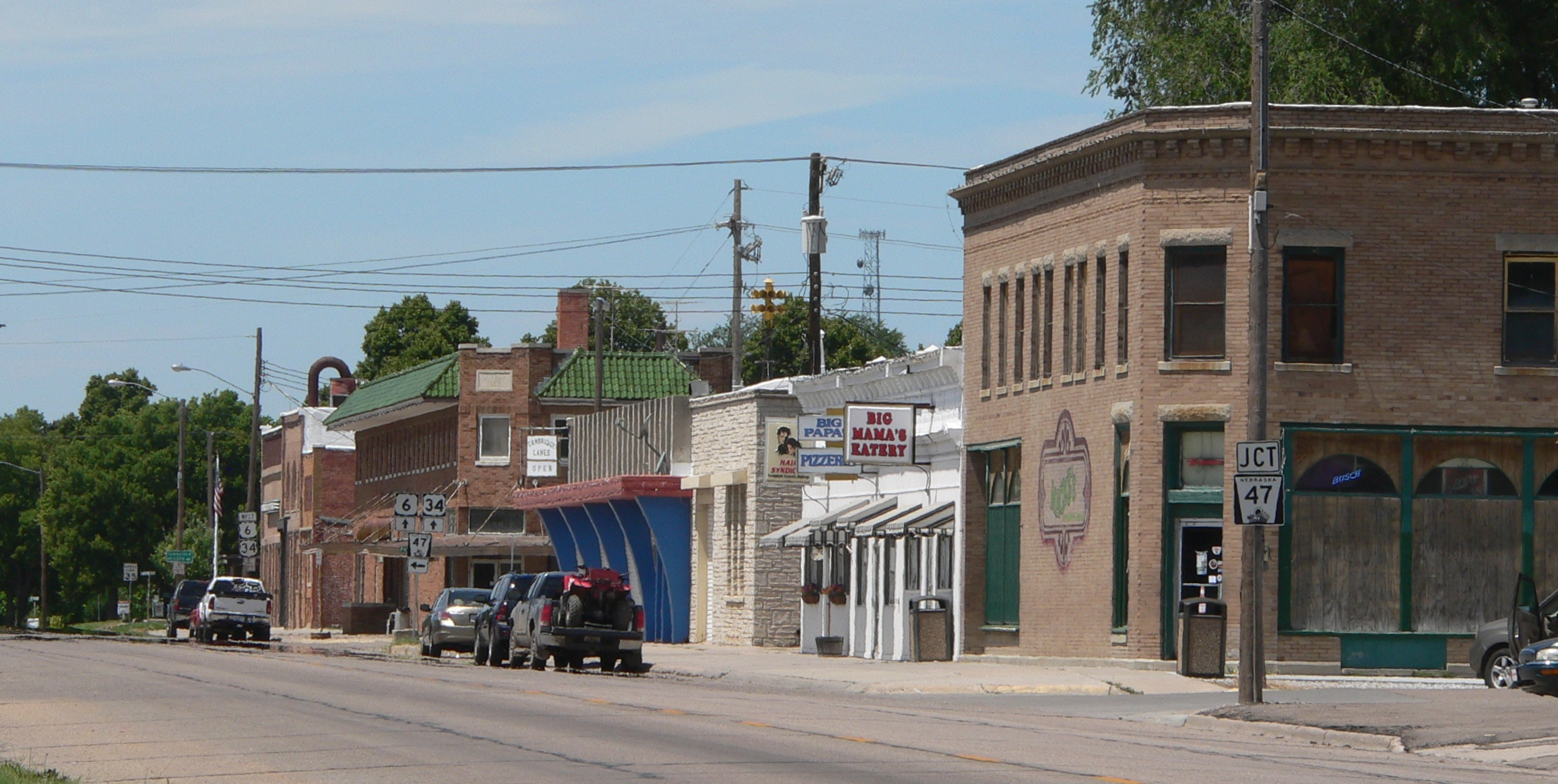
- Cambridge looking west along Nasby Street (U.S. Highway 6/U.S. Highway 34)

- Location of Cambridge, Nebraska
- Coordinates: 40°17′03″N 100°09′55″W
- Country: United States
- State: Nebraska
- County: Furnas

Government
  - Mayor: David Gunderson

Area
  - Total: 1.34 sq mi (3.46 km^{2})
  - Land: 1.34 sq mi (3.46 km^{2})
  - Water: 0 sq mi (0.00 km^{2})
- Elevation: 2,270 ft (690 m)

Population (2020)
  - Total: 1,071
  - Density: 801.0/sq mi (309.28/km^{2})
- Time zone: UTC-6 (Central (CST))
  - Summer (DST): UTC-5 (CDT)
- ZIP code: 69022
- Area code: 308
- FIPS code: 31-07730
- GNIS feature ID: 2393508
- Website: www.cambridgene.org

Cambridge is a city in Furnas County, Nebraska, United States. The population was 1,071 at the 2020 census.

== History ==
Cambridge was originally called Pickleville, and under the latter name was laid out in the 1870s by J. W. Pickle. When the railroad was built through the settlement in 1880, the town was renamed Cambridge by railroad officials. The etymology of the name is uncertain: it may have been named after Cambridge, Massachusetts, or after Cambridge in England.

== Geography ==
According to the United States Census Bureau, the city has a total area of 1.34 square miles (3.47 km^{2}), all land. Cambridge is located on the western bank of Medicine Creek near its junction with the Republican River. Local points of interest include the W. H. Faling House.

=== Climate ===
Climate data for Cambridge, Nebraska (1991–2020 normals, extremes 1898–present)
Month	Jan	Feb	Mar	Apr	May	Jun	Jul	Aug	Sep	Oct	Nov	Dec	Year
Record high °F (°C)	76 (24)	81 (27)	98 (37)	101 (38)	102 (39)	112 (44)	116 (47)	110 (43)	107 (42)	100 (38)	94 (34)	82 (28)	116 (47)
Mean daily maximum °F (°C)	41.4 (5.2)	44.8 (7.1)	55.9 (13.3)	64.7 (18.2)	73.9 (23.3)	84.5 (29.2)	89.4 (31.9)	87.4 (30.8)	80.6 (27.0)	68.0 (20.0)	54.5 (12.5)	42.5 (5.8)	65.6 (18.7)
Daily mean °F (°C)	27.0 (−2.8)	30.1 (−1.1)	40.4 (4.7)	49.7 (9.8)	60.1 (15.6)	71.3 (21.8)	76.4 (24.7)	74.0 (23.3)	65.4 (18.6)	51.7 (10.9)	38.7 (3.7)	28.2 (−2.1)	51.1 (10.6)
Mean daily minimum °F (°C)	12.6 (−10.8)	15.4 (−9.2)	24.9 (−3.9)	34.7 (1.5)	46.3 (7.9)	58.0 (14.4)	63.3 (17.4)	60.6 (15.9)	50.1 (10.1)	35.4 (1.9)	22.9 (−5.1)	13.9 (−10.1)	36.5 (2.5)
Record low °F (°C)	−32 (−36)	−30 (−34)	−22 (−30)	2 (−17)	20 (−7)	35 (2)	42 (6)	38 (3)	18 (−8)	3 (−16)	−14 (−26)	−35 (−37)	−35 (−37)
Average precipitation inches (mm)	0.41 (10)	0.64 (16)	1.17 (30)	2.23 (57)	3.26 (83)	3.78 (96)	3.88 (99)	3.02 (77)	1.67 (42)	1.82 (46)	0.89 (23)	0.67 (17)	23.44 (595)
Average snowfall inches (cm)	4.4 (11)	5.7 (14)	3.1 (7.9)	1.7 (4.3)	0.3 (0.76)	0.0 (0.0)	0.0 (0.0)	0.0 (0.0)	0.0 (0.0)	0.8 (2.0)	2.8 (7.1)	5.2 (13)	24.0 (61)
Average precipitation days (≥ 0.01 in)	3.3	3.8	5.0	7.0	10.0	8.9	8.4	7.6	5.8	5.6	3.6	3.3	72.3
Average snowy days (≥ 0.1 in)	2.6	3.0	1.9	1.0	0.1	0.0	0.0	0.0	0.0	0.6	1.5	2.7	13.4
Source: NOAA

== Demographics ==
Historical population
Census	Pop.	Note	%±
1880	106		—
1890	510		381.1%
1900	840		64.7%
1910	1,029		22.5%
1920	1,042		1.3%
1930	1,203		15.5%
1940	1,084		−9.9%
1950	1,352		24.7%
1960	1,090		−19.4%
1970	1,145		5.0%
1980	1,206		5.3%
1990	1,107		−8.2%
2000	1,041		−6.0%
2010	1,063		2.1%
2020	1,071		0.8%
U.S. Decennial Census

=== 2010 census ===
As of the census of 2010, there were 1,063 people, 490 households, and 272 families residing in the city. The population density was 793.3 inhabitants per square mile (306.3/km^{2}). There were 589 housing units at an average density of 439.6 per square mile (169.7/km^{2}). The racial makeup of the city was 98.6% White, 0.4% African American, 0.1% Asian, 0.2% from other races, and 0.8% from two or more races. Hispanic or Latino of any race were 1.3% of the population.

There were 490 households, of which 23.5% had children under the age of 18 living with them, 46.5% were married couples living together, 6.3% had a female householder with no husband present, 2.7% had a male householder with no wife present, and 44.5% were non-families. 42.0% of all households were made up of individuals, and 23.9% had someone living alone who was 65 years of age or older. The average household size was 2.11 and the average family size was 2.90.

The median age in the city was 47.6 years. 22.8% of residents were under the age of 18; 4.9% were between the ages of 18 and 24; 19.7% were from 25 to 44; 26.1% were from 45 to 64; and 26.2% were 65 years of age or older. The gender makeup of the city was 46.8% male and 53.2% female.

=== 2000 census ===
As of the census of 2000, there were 1,041 people, 486 households, and 282 families residing in the city. The population density was 1,287.3 inhabitants per square mile (497.0/km^{2}). There were 545 housing units at an average density of 674.0 per square mile (260.2/km^{2}). The racial makeup of the city was 98.75% White, 0.29% Native American, 0.10% Asian, 0.38% from other races, and 0.48% from two or more races. Hispanic or Latino of any race were 0.77% of the population.

There were 486 households, out of which 27.2% had children under the age of 18 living with them, 50.4% were married couples living together, 6.0% had a female householder with no husband present, and 41.8% were non-families. 39.7% of all households were made up of individuals, and 28.2% had someone living alone who was 65 years of age or older. The average household size was 2.14 and the average family size was 2.88.

In the city, the population was spread out, with 24.7% under the age of 18, 5.3% from 18 to 24, 22.1% from 25 to 44, 22.8% from 45 to 64, and 25.2% who were 65 years of age or older. The median age was 44 years. For every 100 females, there were 85.2 males. For every 100 females age 18 and over, there were 80.2 males.

As of 2000 the median income for a household in the city was $30,913, and the median income for a family was $37,500. Males had a median income of $28,214 versus $20,250 for females. The per capita income for the city was $19,673. About 4.5% of families and 7.4% of the population were below the poverty line, including 8.9% of those under age 18 and 10.8% of those age 65 or over.

== Education ==
Cambridge Public Schools serves Cambridge. The school district has only 1 high school: Cambridge High School.
