= Merrick County Courthouse =

- Formerly listed on the U.S. National Register of Historic Places
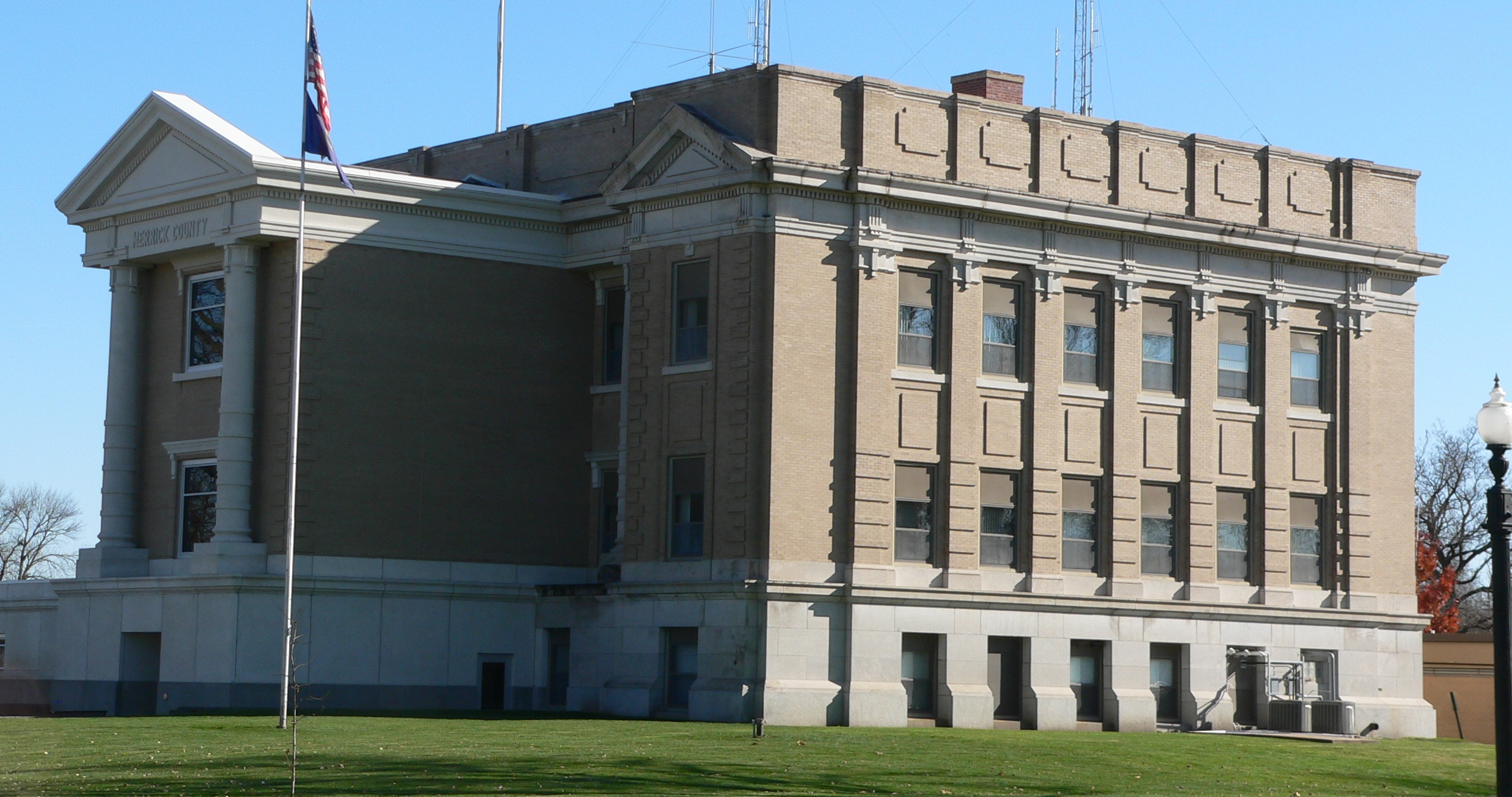
- View from the northwest; photographed in 2009

- Location within Nebraska Location within the United States
- Interactive map showing the location of Merrick County Courthouse
- Location: 1510 18th St, Central City, Nebraska
- Coordinates: 41°6′49″N 97°59′58″W
- Area: 1.7 acres (0.69 ha)
- Built: 1911-1913
- Architect: William F. Gernandt
- Architectural style: Classical Revival
- MPS: County Courthouses of Nebraska MPS
- NRHP reference No.: 89002211

Significant dates
- Added to NRHP: January 10, 1990
- Removed from NRHP: January 2, 2014

The Merrick County Courthouse was built from 1911 to 1913 in Central City, Nebraska, United States. Designed in the Classical Revival style by architect William F. Gernandt, it was built at a cost of $100,000. In 1990, it was listed in the National Register of Historic Places, but was removed from the Register in 2014.

== History ==
The first courthouse in Central City, a two-story brick building, was built in 1871. In 1911, because of the deterioration of the old building, the county voted to approve a $100,000 bond to fund a new courthouse. The county records are incomplete, but construction appears to have begun in 1911, the cornerstone was laid in 1912, and it was formally dedicated on April 24, 1913.

== Description ==
The 66-by-85-foot (20 m × 26 m) building, designed by William F. Gernandt, has one primary and one secondary entrance. It is rectangular in shape, consisting of two main stories with an attic floor set on a raised basement. The basement was constructed of ashlar limestone and granite. The exterior is characterized by four huge ashlar limestone columns arranged along the principal facade and the large stone steps leading up to columns and the main entrance. There are also six squared brick pilasters placed between six windows on the east and west sides of the building.

Inside, the central hallway on the first floor is cross-shaped. There are stairs up to the upper floors and down to the basement. The district courtroom is located on the second floor and the top floor (attic) is currently used for storage. The original interior includes hexagonal floor tile with a regularly spaced pattern in black, tan, rust, and ocher. There have been a few interior alterations—including offices with dropped ceilings and fluorescent lights—none of which significantly alter the original design.

The Merrick County Courthouse was selected for inclusion in the National Register of Historic Places for two reasons. First, it has historical significance at both state and local levels. Second, it has a number of features of the Classical Revival style of architecture including symmetric arrangement of elements, a raised basement, an unadorned roofline, pedirnented bays, and colossal columns.
