= Dawson County Courthouse (Nebraska) =

- U.S. National Register of Historic Places
- U.S. Historic district
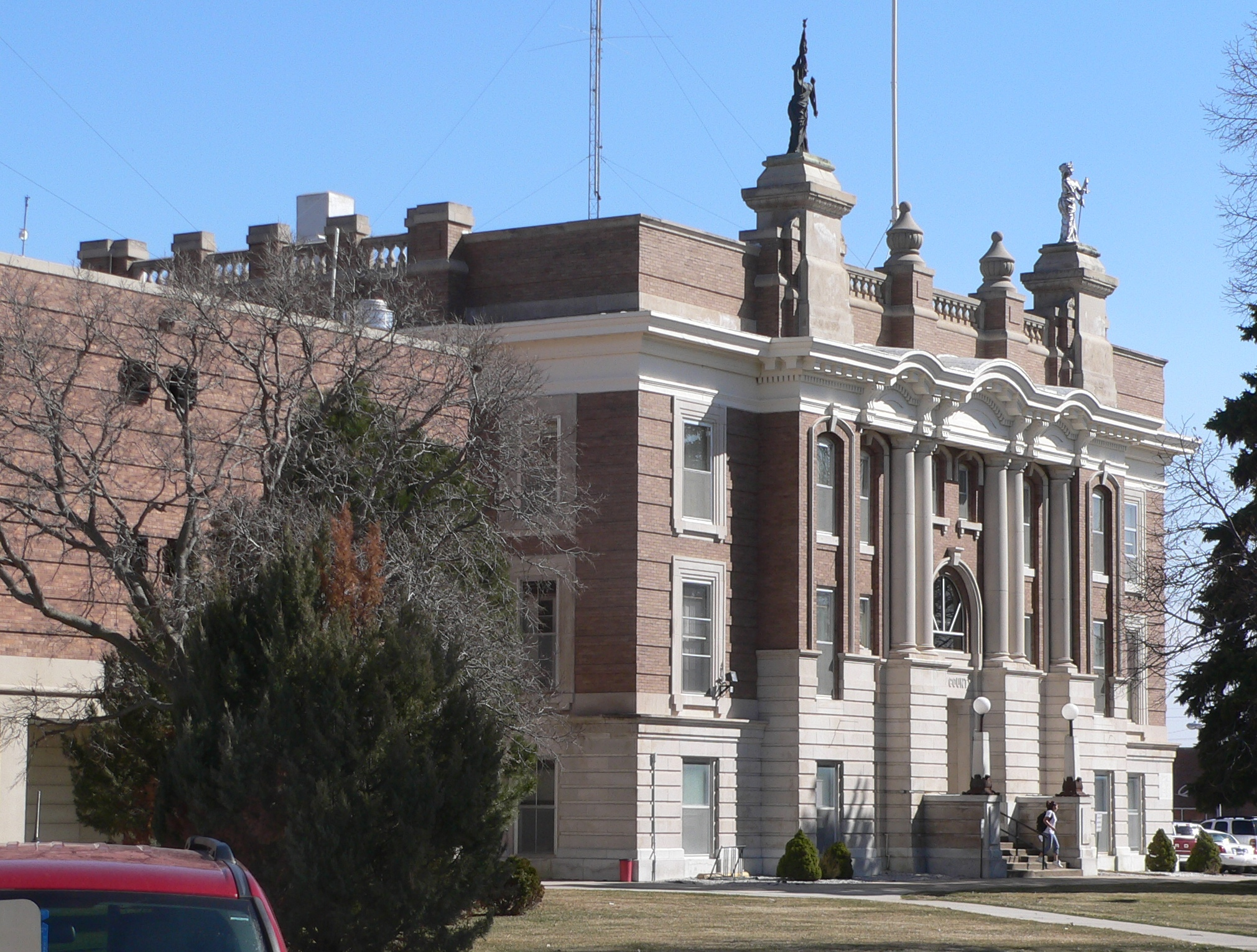
- View of west side, showing statues of Liberty and Justice

- Location within Nebraska Location within the United States
- Location: 700 North Washington St. between 7th and 8th Sts., Lexington, Nebraska
- Coordinates: 40°46′49″N 99°44′25″W
- Area: 2 acres (0.81 ha)
- Built: 1913-1914
- Built by: Falls City Construction Company (Louisville, Kentucky)
- Architect: William F. Gernandt
- Architectural style: Beaux Arts
- MPS: County Courthouses of Nebraska MPS
- NRHP reference No.: 89002236
- Added to NRHP: January 10, 1990

The Dawson County Courthouse is a historic courthouse building located at 700 North Washington Street, between 7th and 8th streets in Lexington, Dawson County, Nebraska Dawson County, Nebraska. It was built during 1913-14 and is listed on the U.S. National Register of Historic Places.

== History ==
Dawson County and Lexington, then known as Plum Creek, grew as a result of the arrival of the Union Pacific Railroad in 1866. Though the county had been created by the state legislature in 1860, it was not organized and established until 1871. Plum Creek was selected as the county seat in 1873, the town's name was changed to Lexington in 1889.

The first courthouse was built on the present courthouse square in 1874. Funding for a new courthouse was approved by voters in 1912 with an annual tax of four mills over four years. The old brick courthouse was demolished and construction of the new was started by May 1913; the new building was complete by March 1914.

== Architecture ==
The two story redbrick courthouse building is set on a raised basement of rusticated Bedford limestone which in turn is set upon a base of marble from Carthage, Missouri. Designed by William F. Gernandt in the Beaux Arts style of architecture, the building was said to be completely fireproof except for doors, window casings, and furniture. Additions to the courthouse were made in 1955-1956 and in 1980.

It was added to the National Register of Historic Places on January 10, 1990 as a historic district. Included in the registration are the entire courthouse block, the additions as contributing properties and a Grand Army of the Republic statue as a contributing object.

The design of Gernandt's Webster County Courthouse, built in 1914, is related, but has arcades that are further developed.
