= Elwood, Nebraska =

- Village
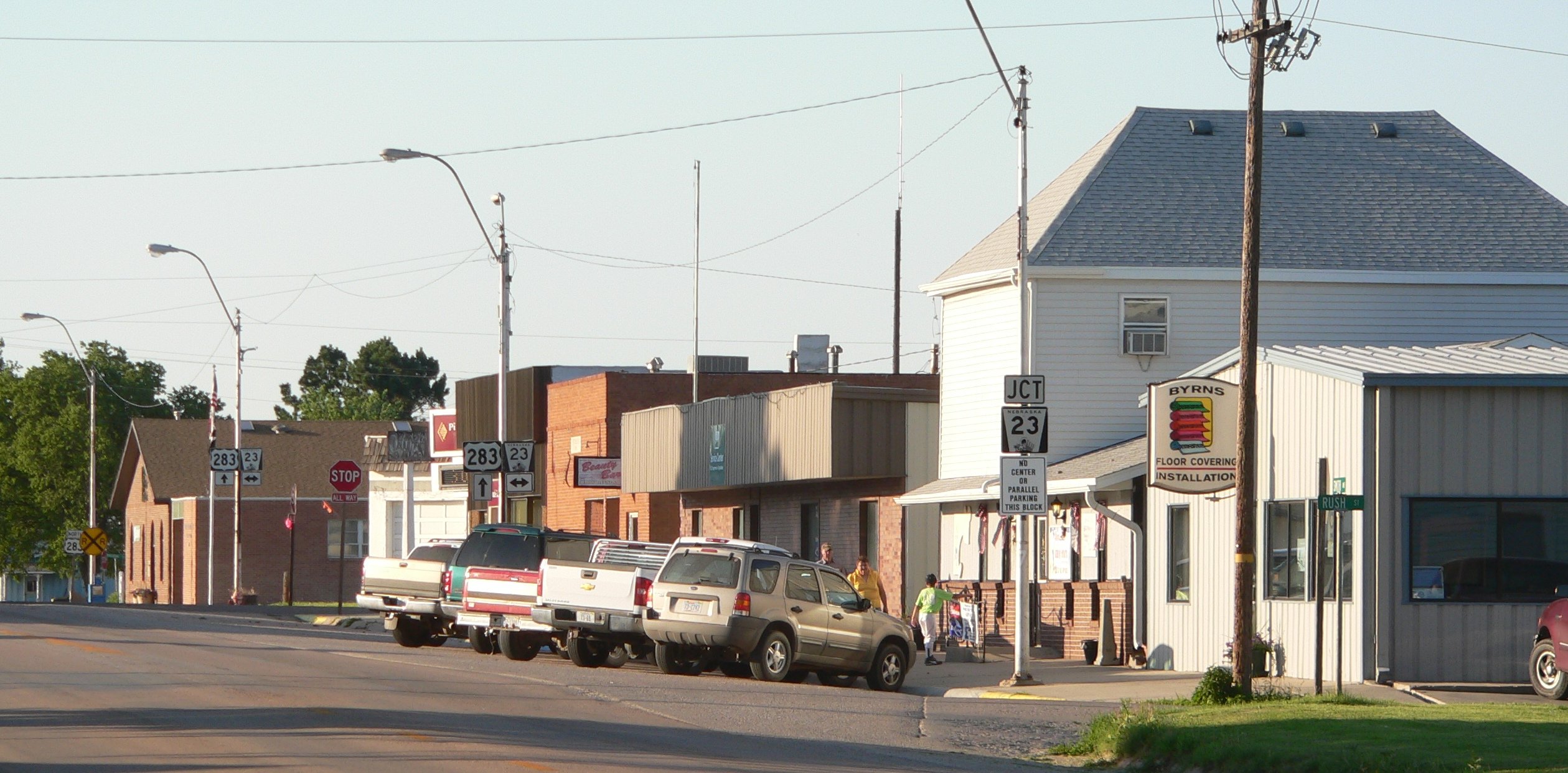
- Downtown Elwood: Smith Avenue

- Location of Elwood, Nebraska
- Coordinates: 40°35′24″N 99°51′43″W
- Country: United States
- State: Nebraska
- County: Gosper

Area
  - Total: 0.55 sq mi (1.43 km^{2})
  - Land: 0.55 sq mi (1.43 km^{2})
  - Water: 0 sq mi (0.00 km^{2})
- Elevation: 2,674 ft (815 m)

Population (2020)
  - Total: 658
  - Density: 1,194.7/sq mi (461.28/km^{2})
- Time zone: UTC-6 (Central (CST))
  - Summer (DST): UTC-5 (CDT)
- ZIP code: 68937
- Area code: 308
- FIPS code: 31-15570
- GNIS feature ID: 2398823
- Website: elwoodnebraska.com

Elwood is a village in and the county seat of Gosper County, Nebraska, United States. It is part of the Lexington, Nebraska Micropolitan Statistical Area. As of the 2020 census, Elwood had a population of 658.

== History ==
Elwood was platted in 1885 when the Chicago, Burlington and Quincy Railroad was extended to that point. It was named for Elwood Thomas, a homesteader.

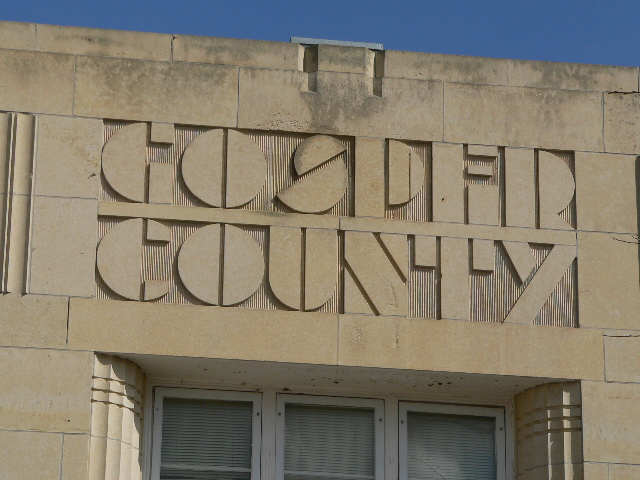
Inscription over the front doors of Gosper County courthouse

The Gosper County Courthouse in Elwood is on the National Register of Historic Places. The Art Deco building was designed by the Kearney architectural firm of McClure & Walker.

== Geography ==
According to the United States Census Bureau, the village has a total area of 0.52 square miles (1.35 km^{2}), all land.

Elwood is located at the junction of Nebraska Highway 23 and U.S. Route 283, and is south of Elwood Reservoir. In Elwood, the two highways respectively follow Ripley Street and Smith Street.

=== Climate ===
Climate data for Elwood, NE (1991-2020 normals, coordinates:40.4767°N 99.8861°W)
Month	Jan	Feb	Mar	Apr	May	Jun	Jul	Aug	Sep	Oct	Nov	Dec	Year
Average precipitation inches (mm)	0.42 (11)	0.62 (16)	1.22 (31)	2.25 (57)	3.70 (94)	3.74 (95)	3.56 (90)	2.92 (74)	1.60 (41)	1.78 (45)	0.84 (21)	0.63 (16)	23.28 (591)
Average snowfall inches (cm)	4.6 (12)	6.4 (16)	3.4 (8.6)	2.1 (5.3)	0.1 (0.25)	0 (0)	0 (0)	0 (0)	0 (0)	0.9 (2.3)	3.1 (7.9)	4.7 (12)	25.3 (64.35)
Average precipitation days (≥ 0.01 in)	3.2	4.0	5.4	7.6	10.6	9.4	8.6	7.5	5.8	5.6	3.5	3.1	74.3
Average snowy days (≥ 0.01 in)	3.1	3.4	2.3	1.1	0	0	0	0	0	0.6	1.6	2.9	15
Source: NOAA

== Demographics ==
Historical population
Census	Pop.	Note	%±
1890	373		—
1900	377		1.1%
1910	464		23.1%
1920	473		1.9%
1930	509		7.6%
1940	633		24.4%
1950	562		−11.2%
1960	581		3.4%
1970	601		3.4%
1980	716		19.1%
1990	679		−5.2%
2000	761		12.1%
2010	707		−7.1%
2020	658		−6.9%
U.S. Decennial Census

=== 2010 census ===
As of the census of 2010, there were 707 people, 282 households, and 183 families residing in the village. The population density was 1,359.6 inhabitants per square mile (524.9/km^{2}). There were 312 housing units at an average density of 600.0 units per square mile (231.7 units/km^{2}). The racial makeup of the village was 95.0% White, 0.7% African American, 0.1% Native American, 2.3% from other races, and 1.8% from two or more races. Hispanic or Latino of any race were 3.7% of the population.

There were 282 households, of which 29.1% had children under the age of 18 living with them, 55.0% were married couples living together, 7.1% had a female householder with no husband present, 2.8% had a male householder with no wife present, and 35.1% were non-families. 32.3% of all households were made up of individuals, and 17.8% had someone living alone who was 65 years of age or older. The average household size was 2.37 and the average family size was 2.98.

The median age in the village was 46.4 years. 24.6% of residents were under 18; 4.2% were between 18 and 24; 19.7% were from 25 to 44; 25.7% were from 45 to 64, and 25.7% were 65 years of age or older. The gender makeup of the village was 46.7% male and 53.3% female.

=== 2000 census ===
As of the census of 2000, there were 761 people, 294 households, and 207 families residing in the village. The population density was 1,561.9 inhabitants per square mile (603.1/km^{2}). There were 319 housing units at an average density of 654.7 units per square mile (252.8 units/km^{2}). The racial makeup of the village was 98.03% White, 0.13% Native American, 0.92% from other races, and 0.92% from two or more races. Hispanic or Latino of any race were 2.76% of the population.

There were 294 households, out of which 29.9% had children under the age of 18 living with them, 62.6% were married couples living together, 5.8% had a female householder with no husband present, and 29.3% were non-families. 28.6% of all households were made up of individuals, and 15.6% had someone living alone who was 65 years of age or older. The average household size was 2.41 and the average family size was 2.94.

In the village, the population was spread out, with 25.0% under the age of 18, 5.3% from 18 to 24, 23.9% from 25 to 44, 19.1% from 45 to 64, and 26.8% who were 65 years of age or older. The median age was 42 years. For every 100 females, there were 92.7 males. For every 100 females age 18 and over, there were 86.6 males.

As of 2000 the median income for a household in the village was $36,500, and the median income for a family was $42,917. Males had a median income of $30,809 versus $22,778 for females. The per capita income for the village was $18,042. About 0.5% of families and 3.9% of the population were below the poverty line, including 3.0% of those under age 18 and 6.3% of those age 65 or over.

== Schools ==
Elwood Public Schools educates students from Preschool through twelfth grade. The school mascot is the Elwood Pirates. Elwood has joined with Eustis-Farnam for athletic teams since 2019. The sports cooperative uses the name, Hi-Line Bulls.

== Notable residents ==
- John Leland Champe (1895–1978) was an academic and archaeologist especially influential in the area of Great Plains archaeology.
