= Polk County Courthouse (Nebraska) =

- U.S. National Register of Historic Places
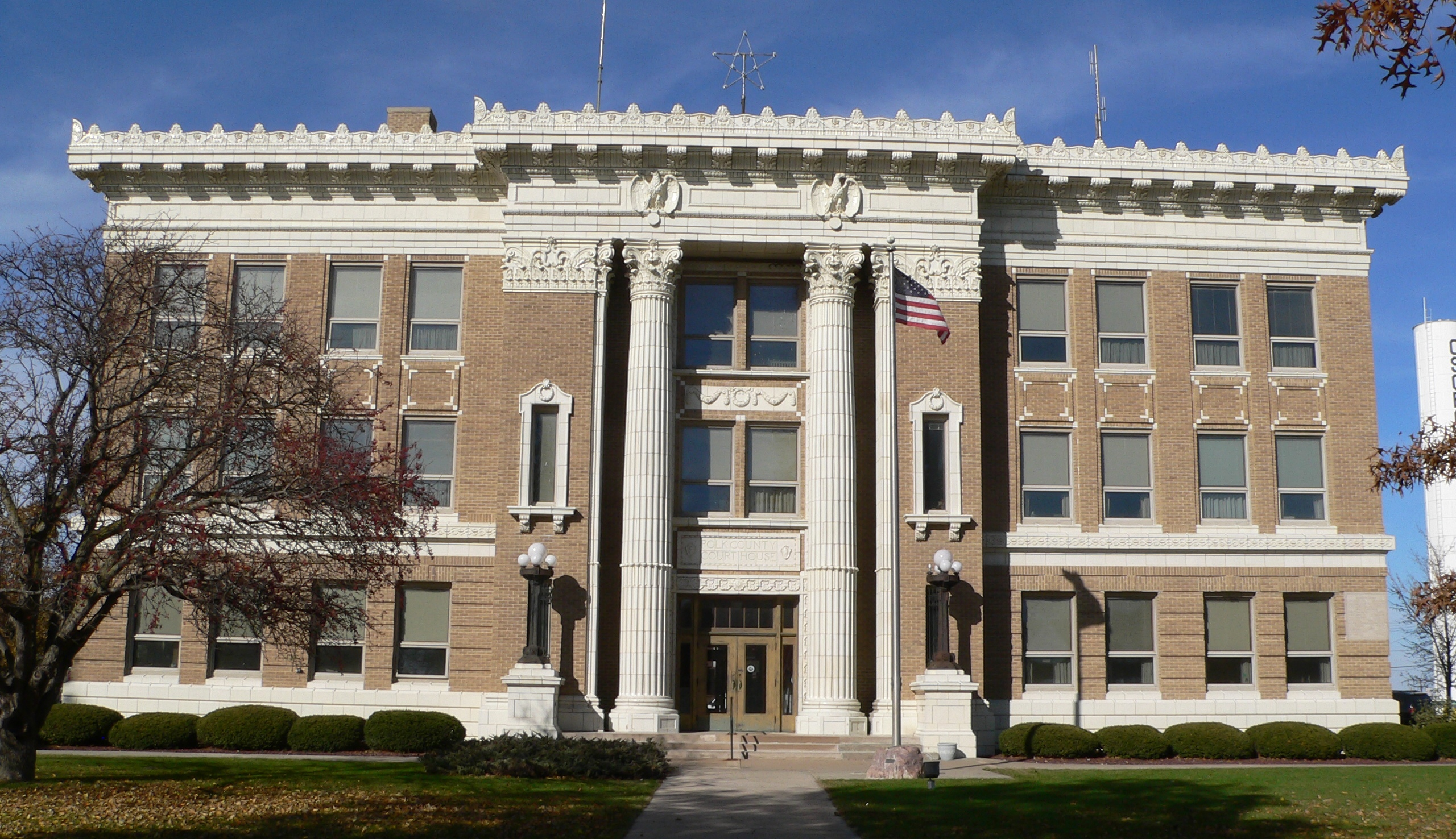

- Location within Nebraska Location within the United States
- Location: Courthouse Sq., Osceola, Nebraska
- Coordinates: 41°10′49″N 97°32′48″W
- Area: 1 acre (0.40 ha)
- Built: 1921-22
- Architect: William F. Gernandt
- Architectural style: Beaux Arts
- MPS: County Courthouses of Nebraska MPS
- NRHP reference No.: 89002238
- Added to NRHP: January 10, 1990

The Polk County Courthouse in Osceola, Nebraska is a Beaux Arts-style building designed by architect William F. Gernandt. It was built in 1921-22 and is located on the Courthouse Square in Osceola. It was listed on the National Register of Historic Places in 1990.

It is a two-story courthouse building on a raised basement, about 98 by 68 feet (30 m × 21 m) in plan, with entrances on north and south facades. Its National Register nomination describes it as "a tour de force of classically inspired ornamentation rendered in creamcolored terra cotta and contrasting tan-grey brick. A variety of rich classical detail, immense columns, pronounced cornice, and rusticated basement are hallmarks of the Beaux Arts Style exhibited on the building. In particular, the terra cotta detail is a visual delight. Acroteria and rosettes march along the top of the projecting cornice, with consoles in an acanthus pattern and an egg-and-dart course below. Shields, della Robbia wreaths, swags, and geometric patterns further adorn the facade."
