= Diller, Nebraska =

- Village
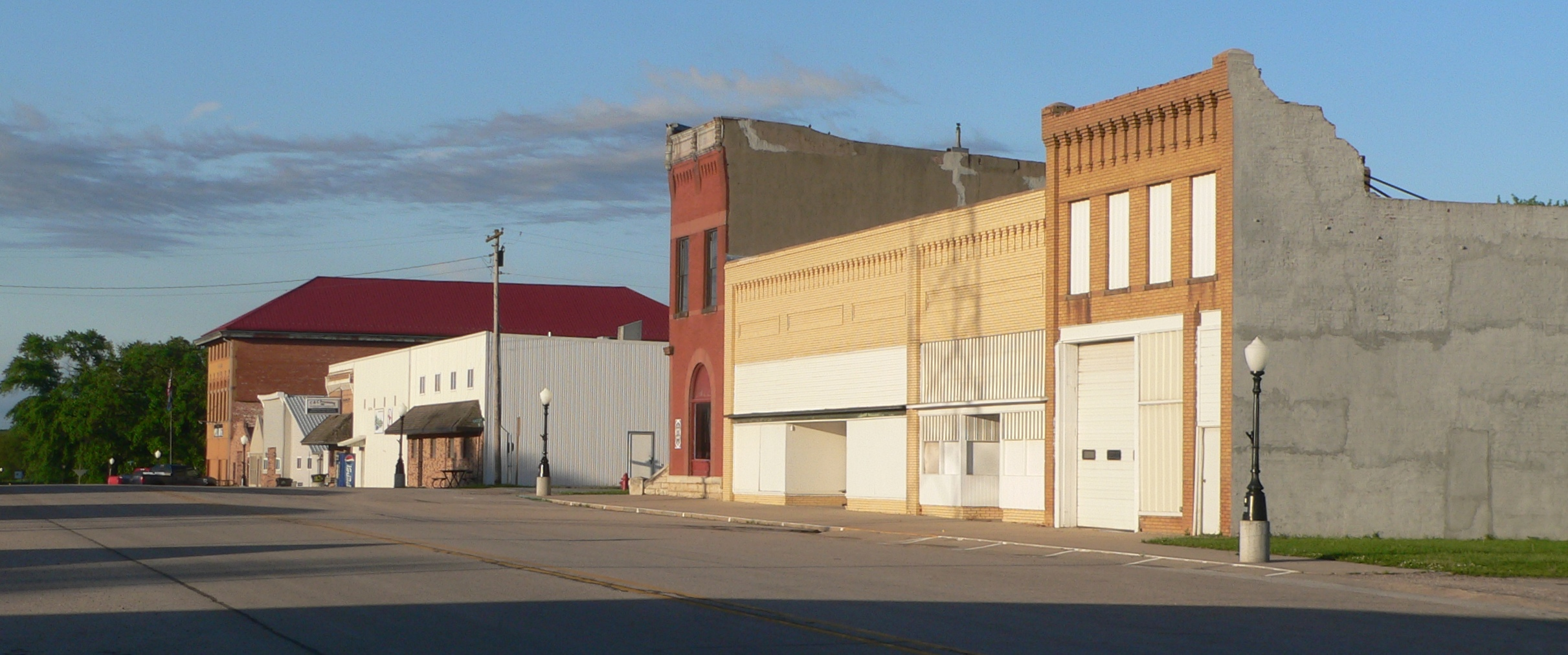
- Downtown Diller: Commercial Street

- Location of Diller, Nebraska
- Coordinates: 40°06′32″N 96°56′14″W
- Country: United States
- State: Nebraska
- County: Jefferson

Area
  - Total: 0.42 sq mi (1.09 km^{2})
  - Land: 0.42 sq mi (1.08 km^{2})
  - Water: 0 sq mi (0.00 km^{2})
- Elevation: 1,358 ft (414 m)

Population (2020)
  - Total: 248
  - Estimate (2021): 263
  - Density: 595/sq mi (230/km^{2})
- Time zone: UTC-6 (Central (CST))
  - Summer (DST): UTC-5 (CDT)
- ZIP code: 68342
- Area code: 402
- FIPS code: 31-13085
- GNIS feature ID: 2398725

Diller is a village in Jefferson County, Nebraska, United States. The population was 248 at the 2020 census.

== History ==
Diller was platted in 1880 when the railroad was extended to that point. It was named for Samuel Diller, a pioneer settler.

== Geography ==
According to the United States Census Bureau, the village has a total area of 0.42 square miles (1.09 km^{2}), all land.

== Demographics ==
Historical population
Census	Pop.	Note	%±
1890	126		—
1900	399		216.7%
1910	506		26.8%
1920	418		−17.4%
1930	405		−3.1%
1940	378		−6.7%
1950	314		−16.9%
1960	286		−8.9%
1970	287		0.3%
1980	311		8.4%
1990	298		−4.2%
2000	287		−3.7%
2010	260		−9.4%
2020	247		−5.0%
2021 (est.)	263	▲	6.5%
U.S. Decennial Census

=== 2010 census ===
As of the census of 2010, there were 260 people, 114 households, and 69 families living in the village. The population density was 619.0 inhabitants per square mile (239.0/km^{2}). There were 129 housing units at an average density of 307.1 per square mile (118.6/km^{2}). The racial makeup of the village was 95.0% White, 0.4% Native American, 0.4% Pacific Islander, 3.1% from other races, and 1.2% from two or more races. Hispanic or Latino of any race were 7.3% of the population.

There were 114 households, of which 30.7% had children under the age of 18 living with them, 49.1% were married couples living together, 5.3% had a female householder with no husband present, 6.1% had a male householder with no wife present, and 39.5% were non-families. 30.7% of all households were made up of individuals, and 12.3% had someone living alone who was 65 years of age or older. The average household size was 2.28 and the average family size was 2.88.

The median age in the village was 39.4 years. 21.9% of residents were under the age of 18; 7.3% were between the ages of 18 and 24; 28.5% were from 25 to 44; 26.9% were from 45 to 64; and 15.4% were 65 years of age or older. The gender makeup of the village was 52.3% male and 47.7% female.

=== 2000 census ===
As of the census of 2000, there were 287 people, 118 households, and 84 families living in the village. The population density was 687.9 inhabitants per square mile (265.6/km^{2}). There were 130 housing units at an average density of 311.6 per square mile (120.3/km^{2}). The racial makeup of the village was 99.65% White, 0.35% from other races. Hispanic or Latino of any race were 1.74% of the population.

There were 118 households, out of which 40.7% had children under the age of 18 living with them, 66.9% were married couples living together, 3.4% had a female householder with no husband present, and 28.0% were non-families. 27.1% of all households were made up of individuals, and 12.7% had someone living alone who was 65 years of age or older. The average household size was 2.43 and the average family size was 2.96.

In the village, the population was spread out, with 25.4% under the age of 18, 8.4% from 18 to 24, 31.0% from 25 to 44, 21.6% from 45 to 64, and 13.6% who were 65 years of age or older. The median age was 37 years. For every 100 females, there were 103.5 males. For every 100 females age 18 and over, there were 103.8 males.

As of 2000 the median income for a household in the village was $37,813, and the median income for a family was $46,071. Males had a median income of $26,591 versus $17,083 for females. The per capita income for the village was $20,759. None of the families and 1.8% of the population were below the poverty line. 0.0% of those under and 3.1% of those 65 and older were living below the poverty line.

== See also ==
- Oto Reservation
