= National Register of Historic Places listings in Seward County, Nebraska =

Location of Seward County in Nebraska

Seward County, Nebraska, United States, has 11 properties and districts listed on the National Register of Historic Places.

The locations of National Register properties and districts for which the latitude and longitude coordinates are included below may be seen in a map.

This National Park Service list is complete through NPS recent listings posted October 30, 2026.

== Current listings ==
	Name on the Register	Image	Date listed	Location	City or town	Description
1	Arrival	Arrival	July 7, 2026 (#100012971)	Blue River Rest Area Eastbound, Interstate 80, MM 381.29; 40°49′18″N 97°03′39″W	Milford vicinity	
2	John Cattle Jr. House	John Cattle Jr. House	September 13, 1978 (#78001714)	W. Hillcrest St. 40°54′57″N 97°06′12″W	Seward	Second Empire-style house built in 1885 for English immigrant John Cattle Jr.
3	Deutsche Evangelisch Lutherische Zion Kirche	Deutsche Evangelisch Lutherische Zion Kirche	June 25, 1982 (#82003202)	3743 Marysville Rd. 40°57′59″N 97°13′46″W	Staplehurst	Now known as Our Redeemer Lutheran Church
4	Ella Eager House	Ella Eager House	January 30, 2024 (#100009512)	915 Walnut St. 40°46′46″N 97°16′45″W	Beaver Crossing	
5	Germantown State Bank Building	Germantown State Bank Building	December 13, 1984 (#84000512)	Main St. 40°56′40″N 96°59′12″W	Garland	
6	Harry T. Jones House	Harry T. Jones House	November 28, 1990 (#90001771)	136 N. Columbia Ave. 40°54′31″N 97°05′28″W	Seward	
7	Seward County Courthouse	Seward County Courthouse	January 10, 1990 (#89002245)	Seward between 5th and 6th Sts. 40°54′26″N 97°05′54″W	Seward	
8	Seward County Courthouse Square Historic District	Seward County Courthouse Square Historic District	July 15, 1982 (#82003201)	Roughly bounded by Jackson, 7th, and South Sts. 40°54′27″N 97°05′54″W	Seward	
9	States Ballroom	States Ballroom	October 14, 1981 (#81000375)	Off Nebraska Highway 15; 41°00′24″N 97°03′31″W	Bee	
10	Troyer Site		March 8, 1995 (#95000159)	Address Restricted	Milford	
11	John and Philomena Sand Zimmerer House	John and Philomena Sand Zimmerer House	February 25, 1993 (#93000060)	316 N. 6th St. 40°54′36″N 97°05′54″W	Seward	

== See also ==
- List of National Historic Landmarks in Nebraska
- National Register of Historic Places listings in Nebraska
