= Deutsche Evangelisch Lutherische Zion Kirche =

- U.S. National Register of Historic Places
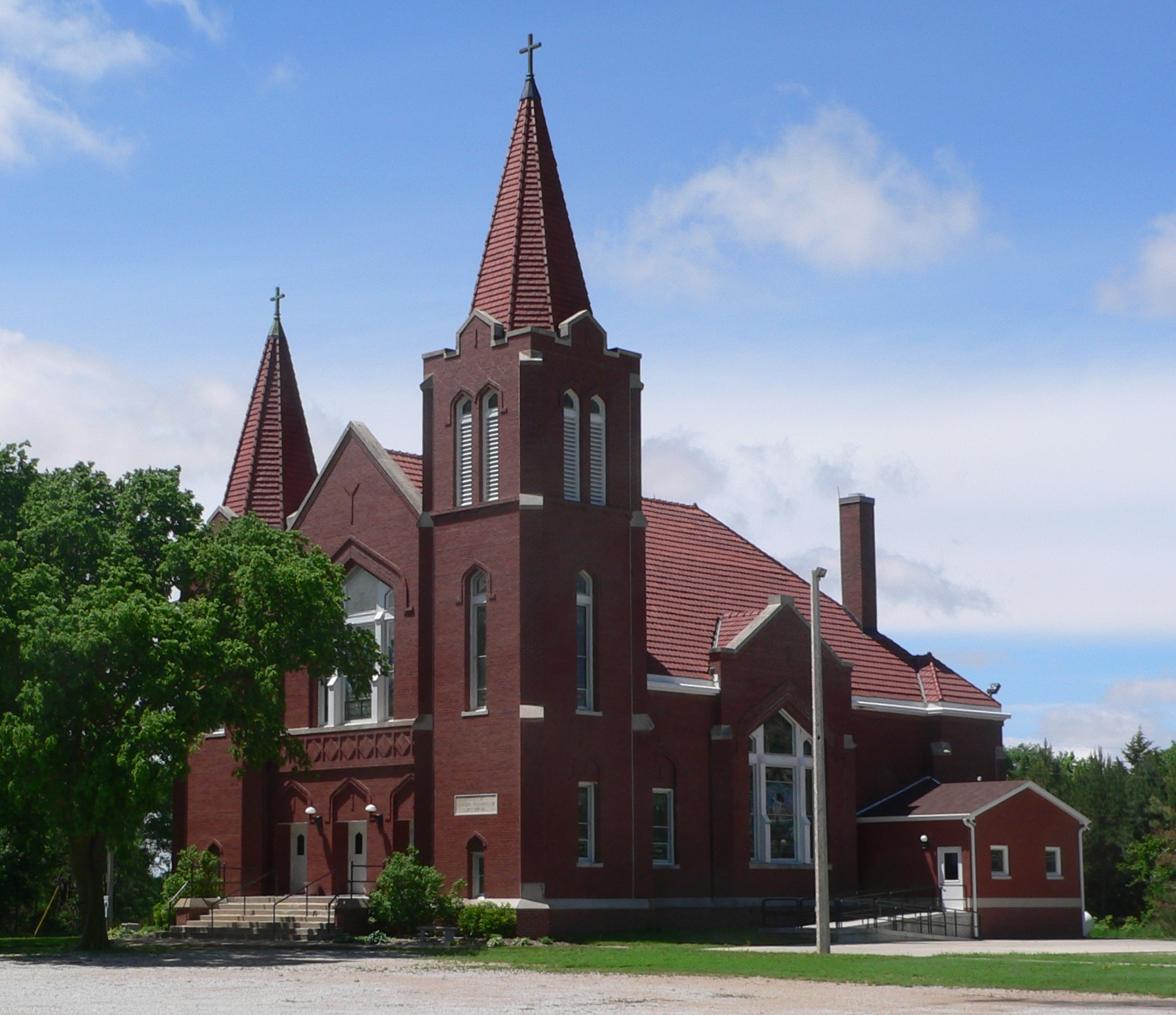
- The church in 2013

- Location within Nebraska Location within the United States
- Nearest city: Staplehurst, Nebraska
- Coordinates: 40°57′59″N 97°13′46″W
- Area: 9.9 acres (4.0 ha)
- Built: 1917
- Architect: George A. Berlinghof; Ellery L. Davis
- Architectural style: Late Gothic Revival
- NRHP reference No.: 82003202
- Added to NRHP: June 25, 1982

The Deutsche Evangelisch Lutherische Zion Kirche, also known as Our Redeemer Lutheran Church of Marysville, is a historic church building in Staplehurst, Nebraska. It was built in 1917 "as the culmination of the fund-raising efforts of farmers in rural Seward County." It was designed in the Late Gothic Revival style by George A. Berlinghof and Ellery L. Davis. It has been listed on the National Register of Historic Places since June 25, 1982.
