= Quentin Neujahr =

American football player (born 1971)

No. 67, 65
- Position: Center

Personal information
- Born: January 30, 1971 (age 55); Seward, Nebraska, U.S.
- Listed height: 6 ft 4 in (1.93 m)
- Listed weight: 297 lb (135 kg)

Career information
- High school: Centennial (Utica, Nebraska)
- College: Kansas State (1990–1993)
- NFL draft: 1994: undrafted

Career history
- Los Angeles Raiders (1994)*; Cleveland Browns (1994–1995); Baltimore Ravens (1996–1997); Jacksonville Jaguars (1998–2000); Denver Broncos (2001)*
- * Offseason or practice squad member only

Awards and highlights
- First-team All-Big Eight (1993); 2× Second-team All-Big Eight (1991, 1992)

Career NFL statistics
- Games played: 62
- Games started: 25
- Fumble recoveries: 1
- Stats at Pro Football Reference

Quentin Troy Neujahr (/ˈnjuːjɪər/ NEW-yeer; born January 30, 1971) is an American former professional football player who was a center for five seasons in the National Football League (NFL) with the Baltimore Ravens and Jacksonville Jaguars. He played college football for the Kansas State Wildcats. He was also a member of the Los Angeles Raiders, Cleveland Browns and Denver Broncos.

== Early life and college ==
Quentin Troy Neujahr was born on January 30, 1971, in Seward, Nebraska. He attended Centennial High School in Utica, Nebraska.

Neujahr was a four-year letterman for the Wildcats of Kansas State University from 1990 to 1993. He earned Associated Press (AP) second-team All-Big Eight honors in 1991 and 1992. He garnered AP and Coaches first-team All-Big Eight honors in 1993.

== Professional career ==
After going undrafted in the 1994 NFL draft, Neujahr signed with the Los Angeles Raiders on May 3, 1994. He was released by the Raiders on August 23, 1994.

Neujahr was signed to the practice squad of the Cleveland Browns on December 27, 1994. He became a free agent after the season and re-signed with the Browns on February 14, 1995. He spent the 1995 season on the Browns' active roster but did not appear in any games.

Neujahr signed with the Baltimore Ravens on July 19, 1996. He played from 1996 to 1997 for the Ravens, appearing in 14 games and starting seven. He became a free agent after the 1997 season.

Neujahr signed with the Jacksonville Jaguars on February 13, 1998. He played from 1998 to 2000 for the Jaguars, appearing in all 48 games and starting 18. He was released by the Jaguars on February 27, 2001.

Neujahr signed with the Denver Broncos on April 3, 2001. He was released by the Broncos on August 28, 2001.
