= Harry T. Jones House =

- U.S. National Register of Historic Places
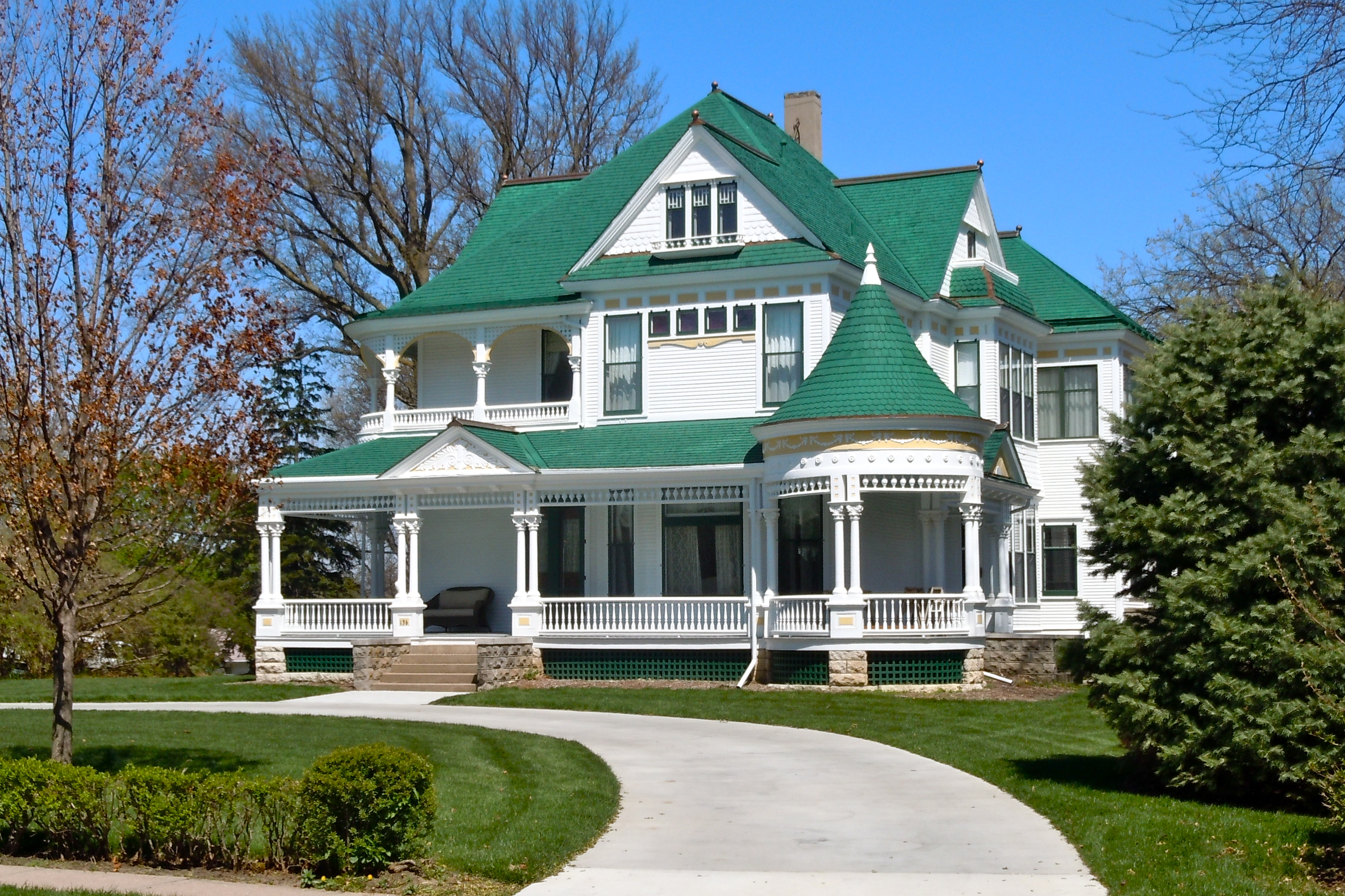
- The house in 2011

- Location within Nebraska Location within the United States
- Location: 136 North Columbia Avenue, Seward, Nebraska
- Coordinates: 40°54′31″N 97°05′28″W
- Area: less than one acre
- Built: 1889
- Built by: John Hughes & Sons
- Architect: George A. Berlinghof
- Architectural style: Queen Anne
- NRHP reference No.: 90001771
- Added to NRHP: November 28, 1990

The Harry T. Jones House is a historic house in Seward, Nebraska. It was built in 1889 for Harry T. Jones, the president of the Jones National Bank. It was designed in the Queen Anne style by George A. Berlinghof. According to historian Joni Gilkerson of the Nebraska State Historical Society, "The main wrap-a-round porch displays classical support colonettes grouped together in units of two or three, a balustrade, spindlework, pediments with decorated tympanums, and a distinctive corner turret with a conical roof of patterned shingles. The second story wrap-a-round porch exhibits similar detailing, including ornamental latticework." The house has been listed on the National Register of Historic Places since November 28, 1990.
