= Ruby, Nebraska =

Unincorporated community in Nebraska, US

Coordinates: 40°49′53″N 97°04′37″W

Ruby is an unincorporated community in Seward County, Nebraska, United States.

== History ==
A post office was established at Ruby in 1883, and remained in operation until it was discontinued in 1905.

On June 13, 2001 a photogenic but violent F4 tornado touched down north of the small community and moved north-northeast where it passed near Seward, the F4 would sweep a farmstead, only an empty basement was left behind, there was no fatalities, but 2 people were injured.
