= Seward County Courthouse (Nebraska) =

- U.S. National Register of Historic Places
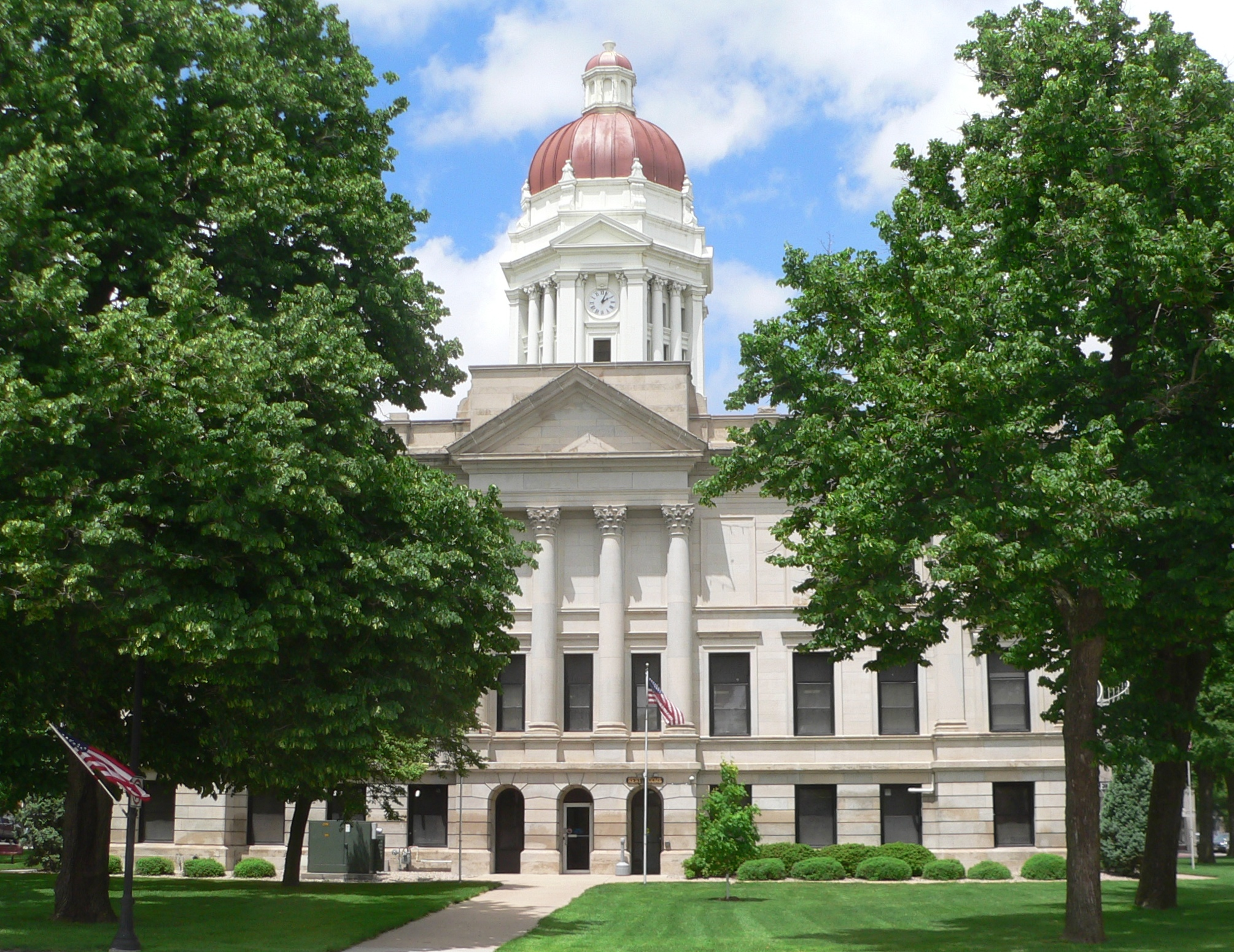
- The Seward County Courthouse in 2013

- Location within Nebraska Location within the United States
- Location: Seward between 5th and 6th Streets, Seward, Nebraska
- Coordinates: 40°54′28″N 97°05′53″W
- Area: 1.2 acres (0.49 ha)
- Built: 1905
- Architect: George A. Berlinghof
- Architectural style: Classical Revival
- MPS: County Courthouses of Nebraska MPS
- NRHP reference No.: 89002245
- Added to NRHP: January 10, 1990

The Seward County Courthouse is a historic building in Seward, Nebraska, and the county courthouse for Seward County. It was built in 1905–1907 on a farm formerly owned by Lewis Moffitt, the founder of Seward. It was designed in the Classical Revival style by architect George A. Berlinghof. It has been listed on the National Register of Historic Places since January 10, 1990.
