= Germantown State Bank Building =

- U.S. National Register of Historic Places
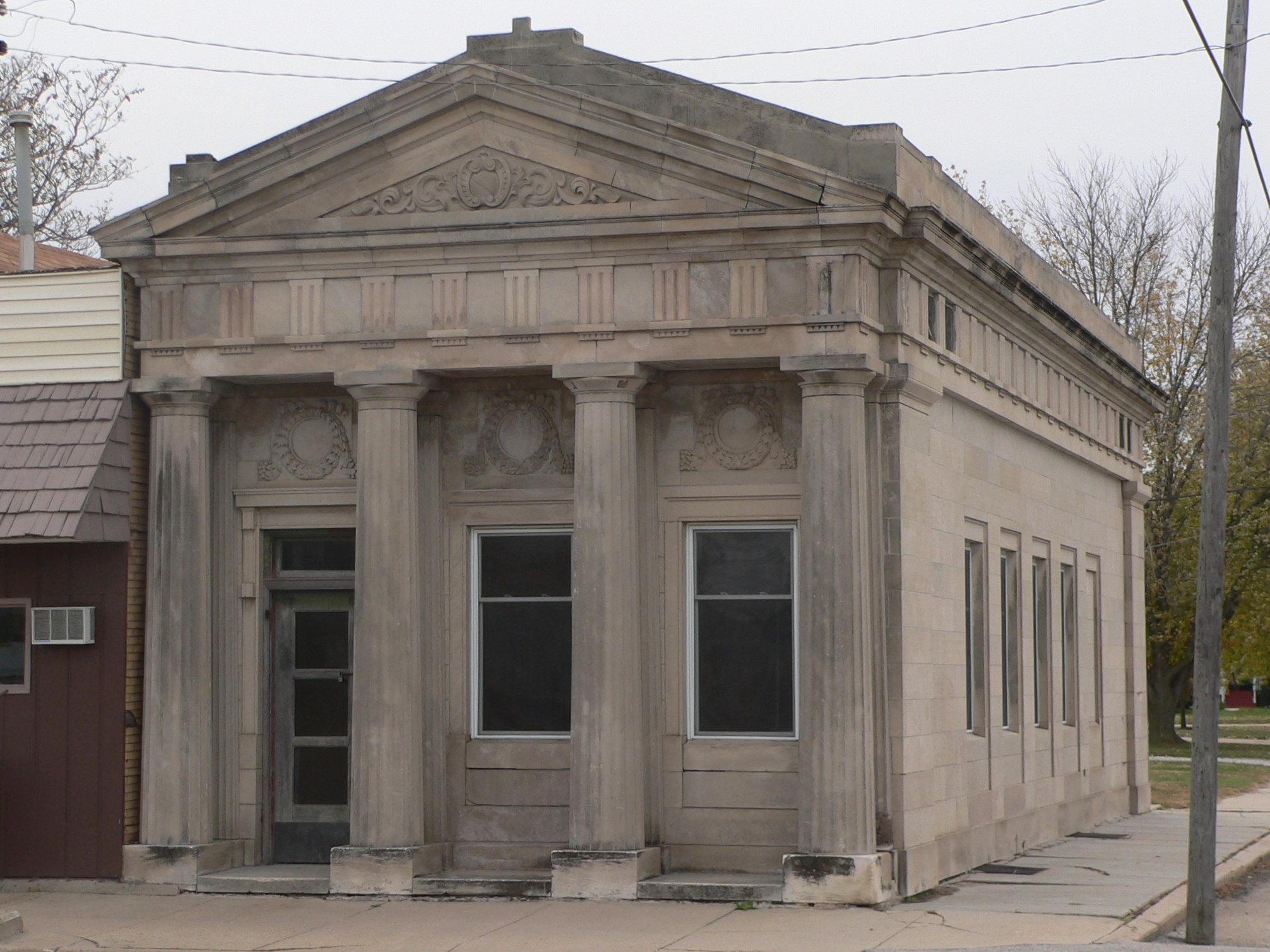
- Germantown State Bank, seen from the northwest

- Location within Nebraska Location within the United States
- Location: Main St., Garland, Nebraska
- Coordinates: 40°56′40″N 96°59′12″W
- Area: less than one acre
- Architect: Ohlen, E. J.
- Architectural style: Classical Revival, Greek Doric
- NRHP reference No.: 84000512
- Added to NRHP: December 13, 1984

The Germantown State Bank Building is a historic bank building located in the village of Garland, Nebraska in the United States of America. The bank is no longer in operation. The building is listed in the National Register of Historic Places.

The first owner on record was August C. Beckman, who acquired the bank from another in 1900. The original bank building was wooden and painted white with the word "Bank" on the front. The bank was incorporated as the Germantown State Bank in 1904; before that, it had operated as a private banking house, the Bank of Germantown.

The current stone building was built in 1920, two years after Garland changed its name from Germantown due to anti-German sentiment in the United States after its entry into World War I. Local residents apparently did not object to the bank's name, which was never changed.

The bank closed in the 1930s due to the many natural disasters affecting the area. Wm. Barrett Jr. took ownership of the bank in October 1939. The next recorded owner was Joe Pankoke, from 1978 until about 1989, when it was sold to Bob Rashel of California. Rashel died in 1998, and the bank was donated to the village of Garland in his memory.

The Germantown State Bank Building was added to the National Register of Historic Places in 1987. Work continues on its restoration.
