= Reinhold Marxhausen =

American artist (1922–2011)

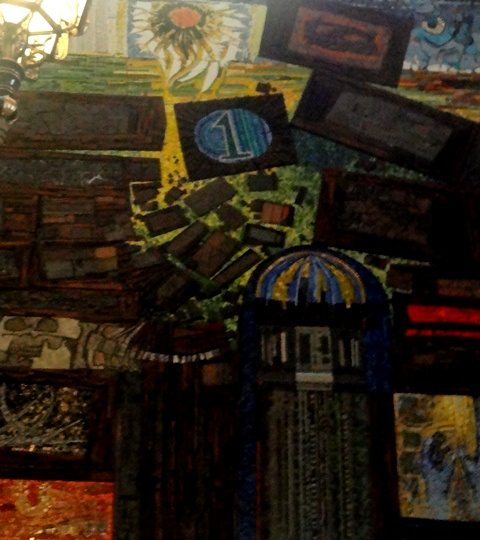
Mural in the Nebraska State Capitol by Marxhausen

Reinhold Pieper Marxhausen (April 13, 1922 - April 23, 2011), was an American artist known for his work in sculpture, mosaic, painting, and found object art. Reinhold studied at Valparaiso University, the Art Institute of Chicago, the Ray-Vogue School in Chicago, and Mills College in California. He became the first art department chair at Concordia University Nebraska in 1951, teaching there until his retirement in 1991. During this time, he gained national recognition through various exhibits across the country. His most well-known works include two massive mosaic murals in the Nebraska State Capitol and the small sound sculptures called Stardust.

== Biography ==
=== Early life ===
Reinhold “Marx” Marxhausen was born in Vergas, Minnesota, to E. J. A. and Aurelia Marxhausen. His father was a Lutheran pastor who wanted Reinhold to follow in his footsteps and attend the Lutheran seminary. However, Marxhausen always saw his future in the world of art. As a compromise with his father, he went to Dunwoody Technical School to learn interior design. After completing his courses, he ran a painting and wallpapering business. Reinhold was successful enough that by age 20, he had opened a paint store in New Ulm, Minnesota. A little over a year later, he was drafted into the U.S. Army during World War II, forcing him to close the business and let his employees go. Marxhausen served in New Guinea and the Philippines as a processor of Japanese prisoners of war. As way to stave off boredom, he made trinkets out of what he found around the islands, such as tin and plastic pieces from destroyed aircraft.

=== College years ===
Reinhold returned from war determined to pursue an artistic future. He was surprised to find out that his father had sent out letters and already enrolled him with the Ray-Vogue Community Arts School. In his very first class, he made the realization that the only thing that had been preventing him from doing any artistic type of painting was simply getting permission to do it. Fueled by both the anger at this knowledge and a passion for art, Marxhausen obsessively attended to his studies producing painting after painting. At the suggestion of a fellow Lutheran, he quit art school and transferred to Valparaiso University. There was no formal art department at Valparaiso, so Marxhausen earned a degree in Biology instead. Immediately after graduation in 1950, a confused Reinhold realized that he had a biology degree, but still desired to be an artist. He went back to Illinois and enrolled in the Art Institute of Chicago. He also took a couple summer workshops at the University of Minnesota in Duluth under the mentorship of Max Weber and Millard Sheets. However, the money from the G.I. Bill soon ran out and Marxhausen began hitchhiking around the country painting and selling watercolors to make ends meet.

=== Concordia ===
Marxhausen sold a few paintings to the Ford Times, a monthly publication of the Ford Motor Company. A music teacher at Concordia Teachers College (now Concordia University) in Seward, Nebraska, noticed his name and paintings while reading Ford Times at a barber shop. He showed it to the president of the college, who had mentioned he was looking for a Lutheran artist. In 1951, the college sent a letter inviting him to not only become an art instructor for Concordia, but also start the art department. Fully accustomed to the life of a professional artist, Reinhold didn't take it seriously. He threw the offer away in the trash. A second letter later arrived when they never received a reply. Given the second chance, he noticed that they also needed him to fill the position of a biology teacher as well. He decided that it was a sign from God for him to take the job and began a 40-year teaching career for the college.

In 1953, Marxhausen married Concordia student Dorris Steinbrueck. They had two sons, Karl and Paul.

In 1962, Marxhausen took a year-long sabbatical to complete his Master of Fine Arts at Mills College in Oakland, California. It was there that he began a life of experimentation with sound sculptures. While creating a metal interpretation of the Solar System, he welded wires to the back of a door knob and decided to strum his fingers across the wires. He put it next to his ear and noticed that they made a beautiful sound.

=== Swede Goehner's Farm and Hughes Brothers art events ===
Throughout his time at Concordia, Marxhausen started teaching art appreciation to the communities in and around Seward. His first large publicized event was at an abandoned farmstead south of Seward called Swede Goehner's Farm on a sunny day in May 1970. It was there that the art department faculty, along with their students, set about making art based on the location. Sculptures were made out of the debris found on the land, and scenes of the barn or surrounding area were painted. Reinhold went around taking pictures of the area. Everyone in the countryside, especially farmers, was invited to this art show. It was an effort to show the community that the art world did not exist just hanging on the walls of a museum, but that it could be found all around them if they just knew how to see it.

In 1973, Marxhausen did another art show with the same theme at the Hughes Brothers Factory in Seward. However, this time, employees of the plant as well as college art students were encouraged to participate with their own projects. It was a very successful event thanks to cooperation of Hughes Brothers and community organizers. Video footage of the art show can be seen in Marxhausen's movie Findings.

=== Tour ===
In 1971, sponsored by the Aid Association for Lutherans (AAL) and Concordia Teachers College, Marxhausen took his family on a year-long tour of the United States to lead workshops at churches and schools. Leading religious workshops was something Reinhold had been testing out for a while at Saint John's Lutheran church in Seward. He credited Pastor Leonard Heidemann from Saint John for allowing him to meld art and Christianity into a worship service that he would later use on tour. The "Artist at Large" tour was completed in four segments of the United States: northwest, northeast, southeast and southwest. During this time, Marxhausen led hundreds of workshops and was featured on several TV and radio broadcasts. His family spent the entire year traveling and living out of their Winnebago. His main goal was to create a ministry to help people to experience and understand art as well as to break the stereotyping of artists in the art world.

=== Artist-in-residence ===
Reinhold Marxhausen's involvement with Bankers Life Nebraska (now Ameritas) in 1973 was another milestone in his life. It began at an arts seminar hosted by the Business Committee for Arts (BCA) at the Sheldon Memorial Art Gallery in Lincoln, Nebraska. During the program, Marxhausen presented his "How to See" slide show that he had honed during the AAL tour. A Bankers Life Nebraska's director of advertising was in the audience and enjoyed Marx's presentation. The director was looking for a new way the company could better support the arts and soon Reinhold was retained by the company as artist-in-residence. His first act as artist-in-residence was to create a "How to See" slideshow show for their employees based on what he found around their home office. Former Poet Laureate Consultant in Poetry Ted Kooser, who was working at the office at that time, mentioned the impact this slideshow had upon his life in a lecture titled “Out of the Ordinary”. Bankers Life Nebraska also helped sponsor three films: A Time to See, Findings, and Time Lines. By the 1980s, his popularity and presentations were such a success that Bankers Life Nebraska began scheduling him on tours around the United States to present his thoughts on art and perception. This program was titled "Do you see what I see?" and it was heavily promoted because of the attention it gave to Bankers Life Nebraska. His enlightening personality and artistic perspective won over his crowds during these travels.

=== The "Flurry" ===
In 1977, Marxhausen started to focus on the need for people to relax and play. His answer to this problem was the "Flurry", a slinky-like toy of honeycombed paper sandwiched between two pieces of cardboard. The material and machine that made it had been invented by Robert Geshwender, the president of the Lincoln, Nebraska, manufacturing firm Plumb Creek, Inc. Marxhausen was the one that saw its potential as a toy and came up with the name. Thanks to his presentations for the BCA, Marxhausen had gotten to know Stanley Marcus, the CEO of Neiman Marcus luxury stores. The “Flurry” was first made available for sale at Neiman Marcus because of this friendship. It soon began showing up at other stores and became popular enough that Wham-O toys made a version of it.

=== Later years ===
Marxhausen retired from Concordia in 1991. In the late 1990s, he began suffering from Alzheimer's disease and left the public spotlight until his death in 2011. His wife Dorris died in 2015. Reinhold had no fear of death and had given a very memorable church service concerning that topic years before. While standing in a wooden coffin, he recited the following poem.

My Capsule Just Fits

I used to be as afraid of death as anyone else.
Even tho we know that Christ has conquered death.

My hair used to be black.
I'm changing.
I'm dying.

This is my casket.
I paid $130 for it.
When it came to my house in a cardboard
box as a kit, I put it in the garage. I did not
open it for a long time.

I was afraid.

Finally
Last summer
I glued the pieces together.

It sets in my studio.
I see it whenever I work.
I stand in it most every day.
I am no longer afraid.

I think about my death often.
When I open my eyes in the morning, I’m
surprised and happy. Another day for me.
A gift-unexpected.
But this day may be my last.

I know you are young
Full of life ahead
To look forward to.
That is important.

I’m 59.

Some of you will die
Before I do.

Farmers don’t throw seeds away. They plant
them. Old and shriveled people and seeds
become new after death-like these beautiful flowers.

This box is a symbol.
A new space capsule for my meeting with God.
A great new adventure lies before me.

This box reminds me every day of God’s
grace and love.
May it be for you also.

R. Marxhausen

== Notable works ==
=== Stardust ===
Since his days at Mills College, Marxhausen had been experimenting with sound sculptures. Some of the created sound sculpture included the Portable Walkman, Cosmic Cube, and Stardust. He achieved a successfully marketable piece of art when he created the Stardust sound sculpture. The Stardust was a small, round object made out of stainless steel that made a light, tinkling sound when shaken. Earlier Marxhausen sound sculptures had wires sticking out of doorknobs that could be manipulated to make tones. The wires were a safety concern for public use. In 1980, while creating pieces for an art show, Reinhold decided to try to make a sculpture that incorporated the wires inside the doorknob that could be triggered by other loose wires. He soon synthesized it to be smaller and look more like a small rock. With a small, modest shell of stainless steel, Marxhausen wanted the sculpture to be an embodiment of his philosophy that, "Even the most ordinary can be extraordinary". An interview with Susan Stanburg on NPR boosted the popularity of the piece. He immediately started getting orders from people all around the world. His Stardusts ended up in the possession of numerous celebrities and public figures. Eventually, one was given to David Letterman by a band member on the Late Show. After a couple months of intrigue about the strange object, the Late Show sought out Marxhausen. He appeared on the show on March 25, 1986, and again on January 17, 1990.

=== Nebraska State Capitol murals ===
In the 1960s, the foyer of the Nebraska State Capitol was to receive six murals representing a theme or part of Nebraska history based on the design of Hartley Burr Alexander. In 1964, the Capitol Mural commission decided that mosaics would best fit the décor of the large hallway and started a competition to select the artists creating them. Marxhausen would not have gotten involved if not for a party at the Sheldon Art Museum. While getting coffee, he met and started a conversation with Fred Wells, who was the chairman of the commission at the time. Marxhausen asked if anyone could enter the contest and Fred told him that he could send in some drawings if he wanted. Out of the four artists ultimately chosen to create the foyer mosaics, Marxhausen was the only one from Nebraska.

In the spring of 1965, the first three artists were chosen. Reinhold was picked to create “The Spirit of Nebraska” which he installed in early January 1966. Since “The Spirit of Nebraska” was such an abstract idea, a lot of symbolism was incorporated into the artwork as well. One of these interesting symbols is the box of human remains within the lower middle of the piece. Marx's explanation for the inclusion, “Those bones are dedicated to all the deadheads in Nebraska, the lazy people, the people satisfied with the status quo, the people who are stubbornly determined not to succeed, all who resist change.”

He was chosen again in the spring of 1966 to create the mosaic “The Building of the Capitol” which was installed in October 1966. It included a representation of the second State Capitol of Nebraska as well as a quote from the Declaration of Independence, “All men are endowed by their creator with certain unalienable rights among these are life liberty and the pursuit of Happiness”.

Marxhausen's murals were unconventionally built and unique in the choice of materials. Besides using Venetian glass, he also incorporated brick and his characteristic burnt wood which he epoxied onto plywood panels that were later butted tightly to one another without the use of grout.

== Artistic philosophy ==
During his years at Concordia, Marxhausen gained repute as an educator. He constantly encouraged his students to see the beauty in everyday life. In a fundamental art class, he took his students outside in the winter, asking them to sculpt with snow. He took students to the local dump for a Thanksgiving Day service, highlighting the vast sea of material goods for which to give thanks. Much of his own art consisted of found objects - garden gloves, dryer lint, tire rubber, marbles, and other scraps he picked up around his home.

Much of his art had a Christian message behind it. Marxhausen was a proponent of creating art for churches, and in fact was commissioned to make works for churches in California, Colorado, Nebraska, Kansas, and Illinois. He said, "Why have gothic art in twentieth-century churches? Shouldn't twentieth-century churches have twentieth-century art?" This quote reflects his vision in which every church would have a resident artist.
