= Centennial Public School =

School district in Nebraska, United States

Address
- 1301 Centennial Nebraska; United States

District information
- Schools: 3
- NCES District ID: 3100099

Students and staff
- Students: 497
- Teachers: 44.01 (FTE)
- Student–teacher ratio: 11.29:1

Centennial Public School is a school district consisting of three schools in unincorporated Seward County, Nebraska, adjacent to Utica. It includes grades K-12.

Tim DeWaard became superintendent on July 1, 2007. In July 2020 DeWaard resigned with all board members approving his resignation. Virginia Moon serves as interim superintendent. As per his December 2020 selection, Seth Ford became the superintendent July 1, 2021.
