= John Cattle Jr. House =

- U.S. National Register of Historic Places
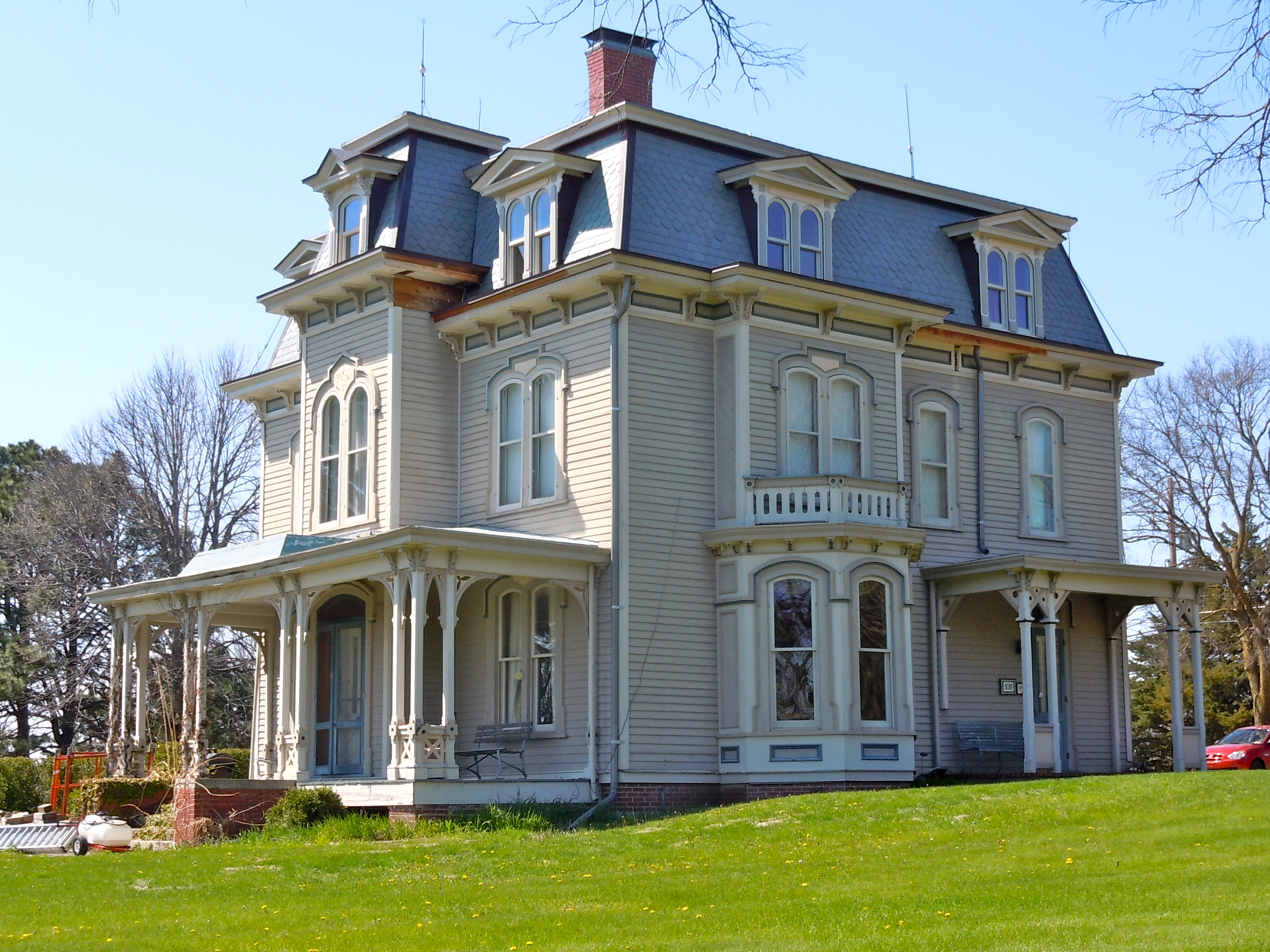
- The house in 2011

- Location within Nebraska Location within the United States
- Location: West Hillcrest Street, Seward, Nebraska
- Coordinates: 40°54′57″N 97°06′12″W
- Area: 2.5 acres (1.0 ha)
- Built: 1885
- Architectural style: Second Empire
- NRHP reference No.: 78001714
- Added to NRHP: September 13, 1978

The John Cattle Jr. House is a historic house in Seward, Nebraska. It was built in 1885 for John Cattle Jr., an English immigrant and co-founder of the State Bank of Nebraska. Cattle lived here with his wife Blanche, a Welsh immigrant. It was designed in the Second Empire architectural style. It has been listed on the National Register of Historic Places since September 13, 1978.
