= Utica, Nebraska =

Village in Seward County, Nebraska, United States

- Village
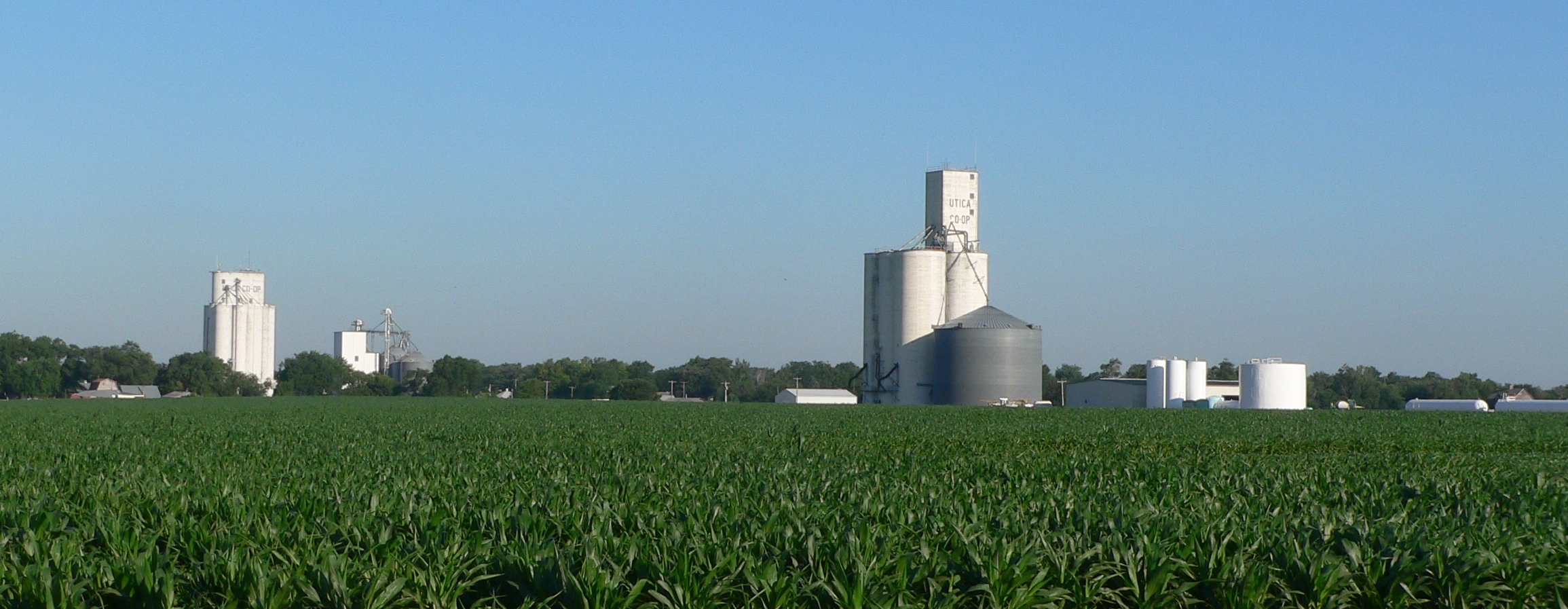
- Utica seen from the southeast, July 2010

- Location of Utica, Nebraska
- Coordinates: 40°53′43″N 97°20′43″W
- Country: United States
- State: Nebraska
- County: Seward

Area
  - Total: 0.46 sq mi (1.19 km^{2})
  - Land: 0.46 sq mi (1.19 km^{2})
  - Water: 0 sq mi (0.00 km^{2})
- Elevation: 1,598 ft (487 m)

Population (2020)
  - Total: 840
  - Density: 1,821.4/sq mi (703.23/km^{2})
- Time zone: UTC-6 (Central (CST))
  - Summer (DST): UTC-5 (CDT)
- ZIP code: 68456
- Area code: 402
- FIPS code: 31-49915
- GNIS feature ID: 2400036
- Website: www.uticane.org

Utica is a village in Seward County, Nebraska, United States. It is part of the Lincoln, Nebraska Metropolitan Statistical Area. The population was 840 at the 2020 census.

== History ==
Utica was established when the Burlington & Missouri Valley Railroad was extended to that point. It was named after Utica, New York.

== Geography ==
According to the United States Census Bureau, the village has a total area of 0.46 square miles (1.19 km^{2}), all land.

== Demographics ==
Historical population
Census	Pop.	Note	%±
1880	194		—
1890	466		140.2%
1900	487		4.5%
1910	520		6.8%
1920	571		9.8%
1930	566		−0.9%
1940	539		−4.8%
1950	550		2.0%
1960	564		2.5%
1970	602		6.7%
1980	689		14.5%
1990	718		4.2%
2000	844		17.5%
2010	861		2.0%
2020	840		−2.4%
U.S. Decennial Census

=== 2010 census ===
As of the census of 2010, there were 861 people, 336 households, and 233 families residing in the village. The population density was 1,871.7 inhabitants per square mile (722.7/km^{2}). There were 364 housing units at an average density of 791.3 per square mile (305.5/km^{2}). The racial makeup of the village was 98.0% White, 0.2% African American, 0.2% Native American, 0.9% Asian, 0.1% from other races, and 0.5% from two or more races. Hispanic or Latino of any race were 1.4% of the population.

There were 336 households, of which 33.6% had children under the age of 18 living with them, 58.9% were married couples living together, 6.5% had a female householder with no husband present, 3.9% had a male householder with no wife present, and 30.7% were non-families. 28.3% of all households were made up of individuals, and 14.3% had someone living alone who was 65 years of age or older. The average household size was 2.45 and the average family size was 3.00.

The median age in the village was 39.7 years. 27.1% of residents were under the age of 18; 5% were between the ages of 18 and 24; 24.2% were from 25 to 44; 25.7% were from 45 to 64; and 17.9% were 65 years of age or older. The gender makeup of the village was 49.5% male and 50.5% female.

=== 2000 census ===
As of the census of 2000, there were 844 people, 326 households, and 222 families residing in the village. The population density was 1,932.3 inhabitants per square mile (746.1/km^{2}). There were 350 housing units at an average density of 801.3 per square mile (309.4/km^{2}). The racial makeup of the village is 99.29% White, 0.24% Native American, 0.12% Asian, 0.12% from other races, and 0.24% from two or more races. Hispanic or Latino of any race were 0.24% of the population.

There were 326 households, out of which 35.9% had children under the age of 18 living with them, 58.6% were married couples living together, 6.7% had a female householder with no husband present, and 31.6% were non-families. 29.4% of all households were made up of individuals, and 18.4% had someone living alone who was 65 years of age or older. The average household size was 2.48 and the average family size was 3.07.

In the village, the population was spread out, with 28.3% under the age of 18, 4.1% from 18 to 24, 25.8% from 25 to 44, 20.1% from 45 to 64, and 21.6% who were 65 years of age or older. The median age was 40 years. For every 100 females, there were 91.8 males. For every 100 females age 18 and over, there were 92.1 males.

As of 2000 the median income for a household in the village was $40,139, and the median income for a family was $46,250. Males had a median income of $28,182 versus $19,605 for females. The per capita income for the village was $15,951. About 3.2% of families and 8.0% of the population were below the poverty line, including 9.1% of those under age 18 and 6.9% of those age 65 or over.

== Education ==
Centennial Public School is the local K-12 school.

== Notable people ==
- Doug Bereuter - U.S. Representative from Nebraska
- F. F. Bosworth - Faith healer born on a nearby farm.
- Quentin Neujahr - Offensive lineman at Kansas State University and NFL player.
- Mysterious Walker - coach

== See also ==
- List of municipalities in Nebraska
