= Grover, Nebraska =

Unincorporated community in Nebraska, U.S.

Coordinates: 40°46′47″N 97°02′16″W

Grover is an unincorporated community in Seward County, Nebraska, United States.

== History ==
A post office was established at Grover in 1885, and remained in operation until it was discontinued in 1908. The community was named for President Grover Cleveland.
