= Francis Vreeland =

American painter

- Born: 1879; Seward, Nebraska
- Died: September 4, 1954 (aged 74–75); Los Angeles, California
- Occupation: Painter

Francis Vreeland (1879 – September 4, 1954) was an American painter.

== Life ==
Vreeland was born in 1879 in Seward, Nebraska. He was educated in Paris and Cincinnati.

Vreeland became a painter in Los Angeles in the 1920s. His studio was located in Los Feliz. He was a member of the National Society of Mural Painters, and the president of the California Art Club.

Vreeland died on September 4, 1954, in Los Angeles. His work can be seen at the Museum of Nebraska Art. He is the namesake of the Francis William Vreeland Scholarship Award at the University of Nebraska–Lincoln.
