= John and Philomena Sand Zimmerer House =

- U.S. National Register of Historic Places
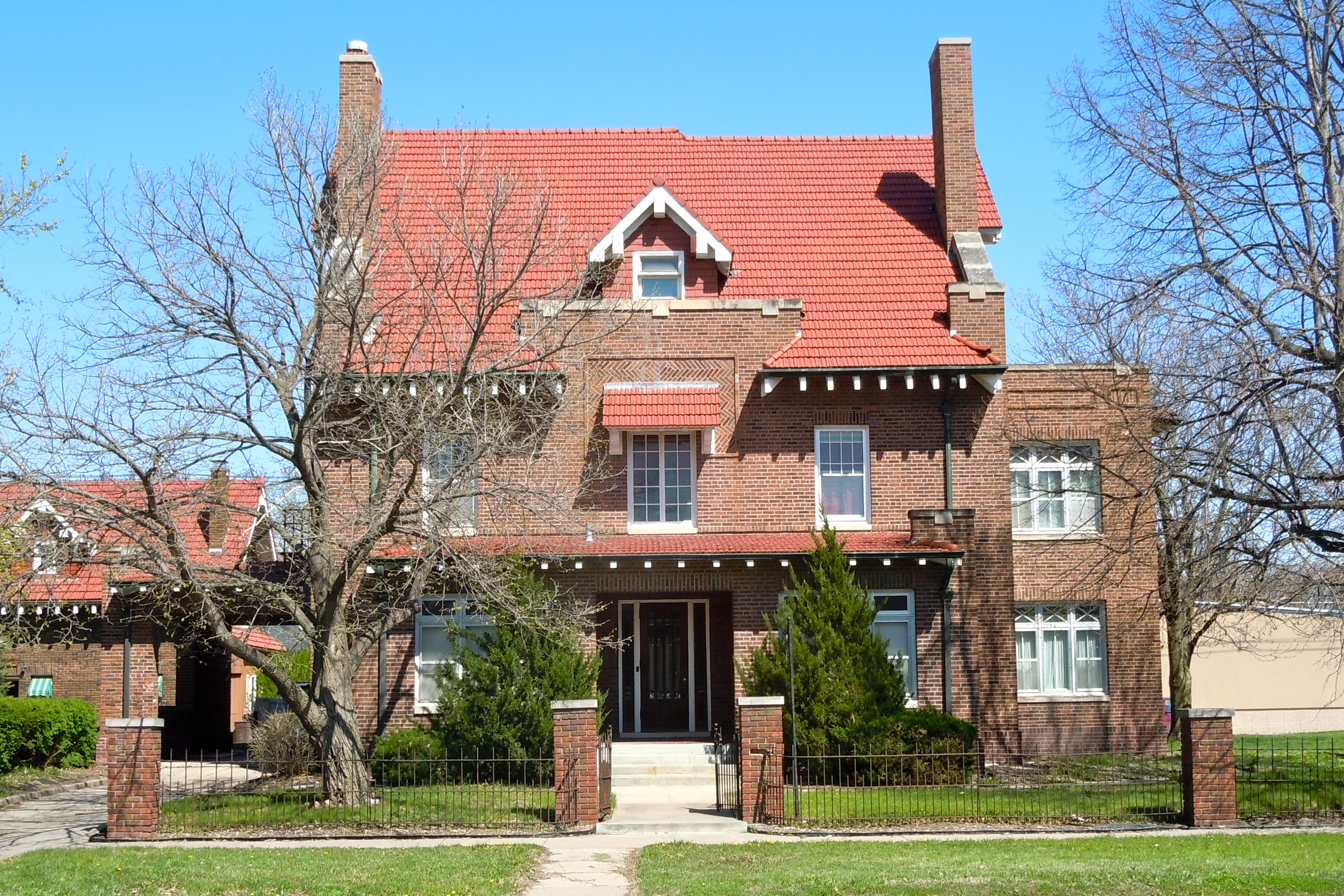
- The house in 2010

- Location within Nebraska Location within the United States
- Location: 316 North Sixth Street, Seward, Nebraska
- Coordinates: 40°54′36″N 97°05′54″W
- Area: 0.5 acres (0.20 ha)
- Built: 1919
- Architectural style: Jacobean Revival
- NRHP reference No.: 93000060
- Added to NRHP: February 25, 1993

The John and Philomena Sand Zimmerer House is a historic house in Seward, Nebraska. It was built in 1919 for John Zimmerer, the owner of a hardware store, president of the First National Bank of Seward, and co-founder of the Seward Equitable Savings and Loan Association. It was designed in the Jacobean Revival architectural style. It has been listed on the National Register of Historic Places since February 25, 1993.
