= Bee, Nebraska =

Village in Seward County, Nebraska, United States

- Village
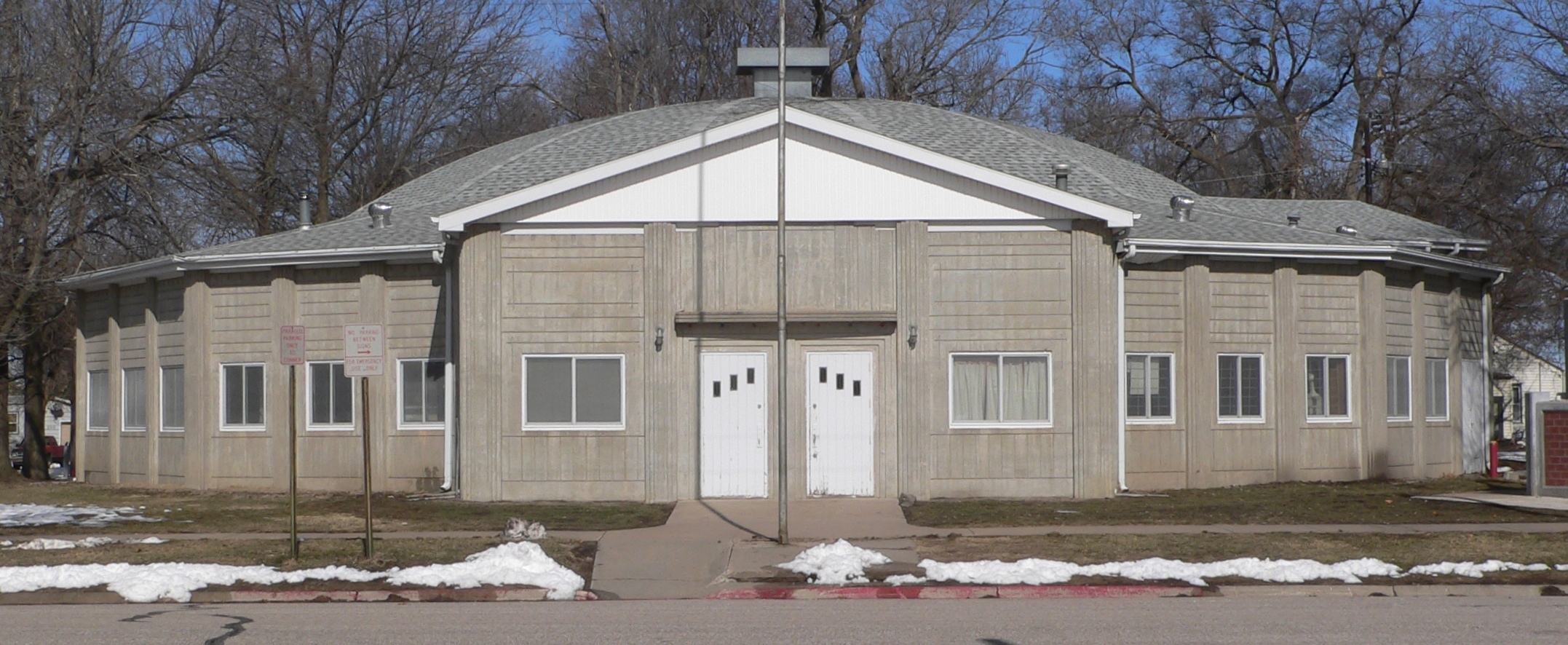
- The dodecagonal States Ballroom in Bee, February 2012. The ballroom is listed in the National Register of Historic Places.
- Nickname: Honey of a Town
- Location of Bee, Nebraska
- Coordinates: 41°00′23″N 97°03′30″W
- Country: United States
- State: Nebraska
- County: Seward

Area
  - Total: 0.25 sq mi (0.65 km^{2})
  - Land: 0.25 sq mi (0.65 km^{2})
  - Water: 0 sq mi (0.00 km^{2})
- Elevation: 1,562 ft (476 m)

Population (2020)
  - Total: 171
  - Density: 684.8/sq mi (264.39/km^{2})
- Time zone: UTC-6 (Central (CST))
  - Summer (DST): UTC-5 (CDT)
- ZIP code: 68314
- Area code: 402
- FIPS code: 31-03600
- GNIS feature ID: 2398065
- Website: https://www.villageofbee.com/

Bee is a village in Seward County, Nebraska, United States. It is part of the Lincoln, Nebraska Metropolitan Statistical Area. The population was 171 at the 2020 census.

== History ==
Bee was laid out in 1887 when the Chicago and North Western Railroad was extended to that point. The village was named from its location in B Township.

== Geography ==
According to the United States Census Bureau, the village has a total area of 0.25 square miles (0.65 km^{2}), all land.

== Demographics ==
Historical population
Census	Pop.	Note	%±
1910	207		—
1920	228		10.1%
1930	205		−10.1%
1940	205		0.0%
1950	160		−22.0%
1960	149		−6.9%
1970	156		4.7%
1980	192		23.1%
1990	209		8.9%
2000	223		6.7%
2010	191		−14.3%
2020	171		−10.5%
U.S. Decennial Census

=== 2010 census ===
At the 2010 census there were 191 people, 78 households, and 53 families in the village. The population density was 764.0 inhabitants per square mile (295.0/km^{2}). There were 91 housing units at an average density of 364.0 units per square mile (140.5 units/km^{2}). The racial makeup of the village was 100.0% White. Hispanic or Latino of any race were 3.1%.

Of the 78 households 28.2% had children under the age of 18 living with them, 53.8% were married couples living together, 10.3% had a female householder with no husband present, 3.8% had a male householder with no wife present, and 32.1% were non-families. 29.5% of households were one person and 7.7% were one person aged 65 or older. The average household size was 2.45 and the average family size was 3.02.

The median age in the village was 42.8 years. 23% of residents were under the age of 18; 5.7% were between the ages of 18 and 24; 23.5% were from 25 to 44; 32.4% were from 45 to 64; and 15.2% were 65 or older. The gender makeup of the village was 52.4% male and 47.6% female.

=== 2000 census ===
At the 2000 census there were 223 people, 84 households, and 60 families in the village. The population density was 899.2 inhabitants per square mile (347.2/km^{2}). There were 89 housing units at an average density of 358.9 units per square mile (138.6 units/km^{2}). The racial makeup of the village was 99.10% White, and 0.90% from two or more races.

Of the 84 households 33.3% had children under the age of 18 living with them, 60.7% were married couples living together, 6.0% had a female householder with no husband present, and 27.4% were non-families. 22.6% of households were one person and 13.1% were one person aged 65 or older. The average household size was 2.65 and the average family size was 3.13.

The age distribution was 28.3% under the age of 18, 5.4% from 18 to 24, 33.2% from 25 to 44, 18.8% from 45 to 64, and 14.3% 65 or older. The median age was 35 years. For every 100 females, there were 110.4 males. For every 100 females age 18 and over, there were 119.2 males.

The median household income was $42,917, and the median family income was $44,583. Males had a median income of $26,500 versus $18,750 for females. The per capita income for the village was $18,388. About 7.3% of families and 6.6% of the population were below the poverty line, including none of those under the age of 18 and 14.7% of those 65 or over.

== See also ==
- List of municipalities in Nebraska
- States Ballroom
