= States Ballroom =

- U.S. National Register of Historic Places
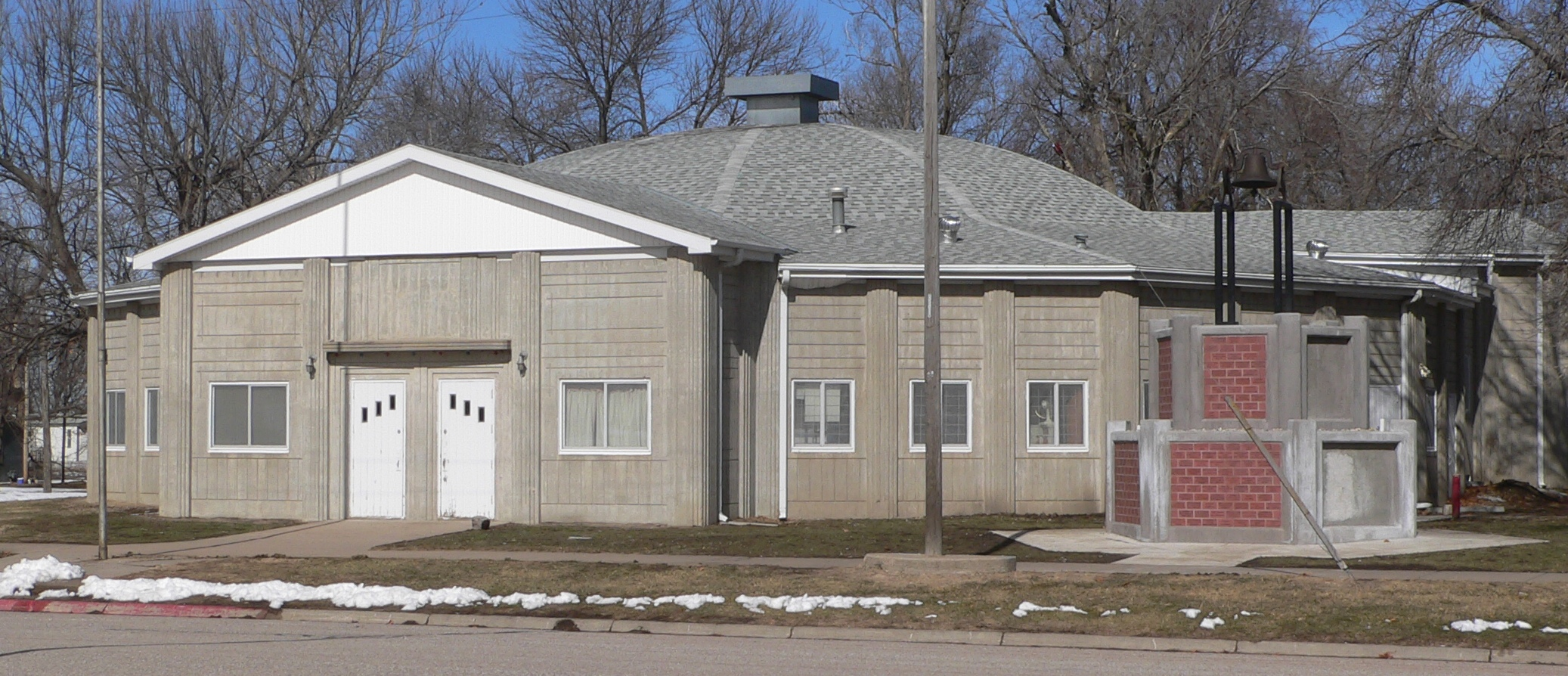

- Location within Nebraska Location within the United States
- Location: Off Nebraska Highway 15, Bee, Nebraska
- Coordinates: 41°00′24″N 97°03′31″W
- Area: less than one acre
- Built: 1938-40
- Architect: Sobotka, Vladimir
- Architectural style: Moderne
- NRHP reference No.: 81000375
- Added to NRHP: October 14, 1981

The States Ballroom is a historic community building in Bee, Nebraska. Originally built as a dance hall, the building opened in 1939 as a Works Progress Administration project. Bee architect Vladimir Sobotka designed the twelve-sided building, which incorporates Moderne features. The building is a defining landmark for Bee and is on the National Register of Historic Places.

== History ==
Work on the ballroom began in 1938 using funds from the Works Progress Administration. By the following year, the building was ready to open, although its interior was not finished. Its grand opening in May 1939 sold 2000 tickets, ten times Bee's population, and earned the village enough money to complete the interior. After construction was officially complete, the village dedicated the building in 1940. Nebraska Governor Roy Cochran and other public figures spoke at the dedication ceremony, which also featured a baseball game, concerts, and a dance in the finished ballroom.

While it was only meant to be a ballroom at first, the building soon became host to a great variety of public events in Bee. Concerts, plays, weddings, and estate sales have all been held in the building. The local junior high school played its basketball games in the ballroom; its dome-like appearance led opposing teams to call it the Bee Astrodome. In keeping with its original purpose, the village also holds an annual barn dance in the ballroom. Due to its unusual shape and local importance for the small village, the ballroom has become a defining landmark for Bee. The ballroom was added to the National Register of Historic Places on October 14, 1981.

The ballroom is featured in Jon Bois' multimedia fictional work 17776. After randomly picking the region on a globe and discovering the story of the ballroom's construction, Bois added it to prove "that you can't go far in this world without running into a story."

== Design ==
Architect Vladimir Sobotka, a Bee resident, designed and built the ballroom. Sobotka's design for the building was a vernacular plan that incorporated Moderne elements. The building is twelve-sided with concrete walls and a domed roof. As it was originally meant to primarily host ballroom dances, the building's many sides allowed for a wooden dance floor on which dancers could always follow the wood's grain. The ballroom's concrete exterior is inlaid with patterns of horizontal and vertical lines, giving the building its Moderne appearance without extensive formal styling. Upon his retirement in 1981, Sobotka called the building his "pride and joy."
