= Seward County, Nebraska =

County in Nebraska, United States

- County
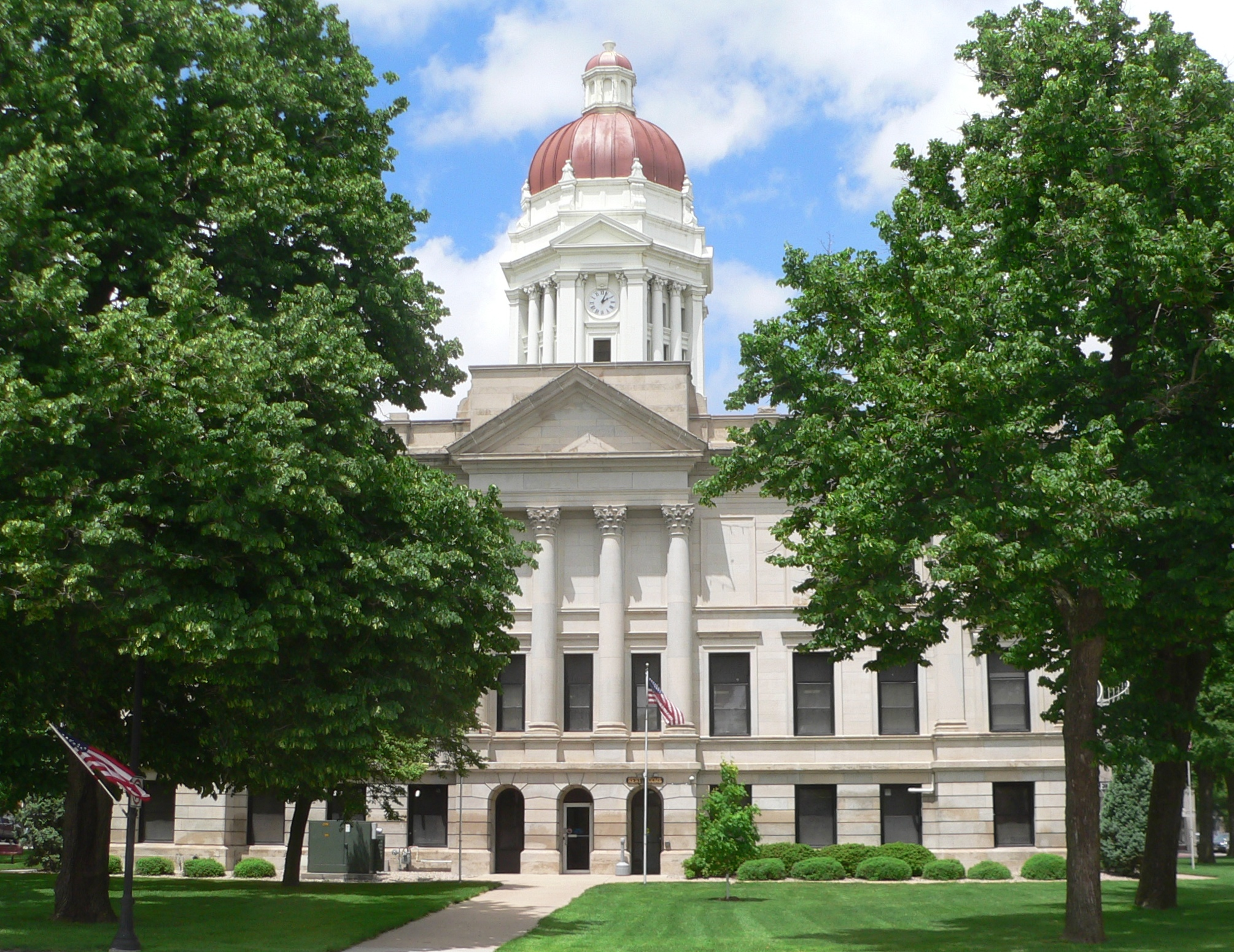
- The Seward County Courthouse in Seward

- Location within the U.S. state of Nebraska
- Coordinates: 40.871944°N 97.140383°W
- Country: United States
- State: Nebraska
- Created: March 16, 1855
- Organized: October 1, 1865
- Named for: William H. Seward
- Seat: Seward
- Largest city: Seward

Area
  - Total: 575.886 sq mi (1,491.54 km^{2})
  - Land: 571.431 sq mi (1,480.00 km^{2})
  - Water: 4.455 sq mi (11.54 km^{2}) 0.77%

Population (2020)
  - Total: 17,609
  - Estimate (2025): 18,032 ▲
  - Density: 30.816/sq mi (11.898/km^{2})
- Time zone: UTC−6 (Central)
  - Summer (DST): UTC−5 (CDT)
- Area code: 402 and 531
- Congressional district: 1st
- Website: sewardcountyne.gov
- • Nebraska county number 80 • Nebraska license plate prefix 16

Seward County is a county in the U.S. state of Nebraska. As of the 2020 census, the population was 17,609, and was estimated to be 18,032 in 2025. The county seat and the largest city is Seward.

Seward County is part of the Lincoln, NE metropolitan area.

In the Nebraska license plate system, Seward County was represented by the prefix "16" (as it had the 16th-largest number of vehicles registered in the state when the license plate system was established in 1922).

== History ==
Seward County was created on March 16, 1855 and organized on October 1, 1865. It was originally called Greene County, and in 1862 it was renamed for William H. Seward, Secretary of State under Abraham Lincoln and Andrew Johnson.

== Geography ==
According to the United States Census Bureau, the county has a total area of 575.886 square miles (1,491.54 km^{2}), of which 571.431 square miles (1,480.00 km^{2}) is land and 4.455 square miles (11.54 km^{2}) (0.77%) is water. It is the 56th-largest county in Nebraska by total area.

The Seward County terrain consists of low rolling hills, largely dedicated to agriculture including center pivot irrigation. The Big Blue River flows south-southeasterly through the central part of the county.

=== Adjacent counties ===
- Butler County – north
- Lancaster County – east
- Saline County – south
- Fillmore County – southwest
- York County – west
- Polk County – northwest

=== Protected areas ===
- Bur Oak State Wildlife Management Area
- Freeman Lakes Waterfowl Production Area
- North Lake Basin State Wildlife Management Area
- Oak Glen State Wildlife Management Area
- Tamora Waterfowl Production Area

== Demographics ==
Historical population
Census	Pop.	Note	%±
1870	2,953		—
1880	11,147		277.5%
1890	16,140		44.8%
1900	15,690		−2.8%
1910	15,895		1.3%
1920	15,867		−0.2%
1930	15,938		0.4%
1940	14,167		−11.1%
1950	13,155		−7.1%
1960	13,581		3.2%
1970	14,460		6.5%
1980	15,789		9.2%
1990	15,450		−2.1%
2000	16,496		6.8%
2010	16,750		1.5%
2020	17,609		5.1%
2025 (est.)	18,032	▲	2.4%
U.S. Decennial Census; 1790–1960 1900–1990; 1990–2000 2010–2020

=== 2020 census ===
As of the 2020 census, the county had a population of 17,609. The median age was 37.9 years. 23.8% of residents were under the age of 18 and 18.4% of residents were 65 years of age or older. For every 100 females there were 103.5 males, and for every 100 females age 18 and over there were 102.6 males age 18 and over.

The racial makeup of the county was 94.1% White, 0.6% Black or African American, 0.3% American Indian and Alaska Native, 0.3% Asian, 0.0% Native Hawaiian and Pacific Islander, 1.0% from some other race, and 3.7% from two or more races. Hispanic or Latino residents of any race comprised 2.8% of the population.

42.4% of residents lived in urban areas, while 57.6% lived in rural areas.

There were 6,558 households in the county, of which 31.8% had children under the age of 18 living with them and 19.5% had a female householder with no spouse or partner present. About 26.1% of all households were made up of individuals and 12.7% had someone living alone who was 65 years of age or older.

There were 7,061 housing units, of which 7.1% were vacant. Among occupied housing units, 74.4% were owner-occupied and 25.6% were renter-occupied. The homeowner vacancy rate was 0.7% and the rental vacancy rate was 7.5%.

=== 2000 census ===
As of the 2000 census, there were 16,496 people, 6,013 households, and 4,215 families in the county. The population density was 29 inhabitants per square mile (11/km^{2}). There were 6,428 housing units at an average density of 11 units per square mile (4.2/km^{2}). The racial makeup of the county was 98.05% White, 0.28% Black or African American, 0.21% Native American, 0.29% Asian, 0.05% Pacific Islander, 0.40% from other races, and 0.72% from two or more races. 1.09% of the population were Hispanic or Latino of any race.

There were 6,013 households, out of which 32.80% had children under the age of 18 living with them, 61.50% were married couples living together, 5.60% had a female householder with no husband present, and 29.90% were non-families. 24.90% of all households were made up of individuals, and 12.10% had someone living alone who was 65 years of age or older. The average household size was 2.53 and the average family size was 3.04.

The county population contained 24.70% under the age of 18, 14.30% from 18 to 24, 24.60% from 25 to 44, 21.20% from 45 to 64, and 15.20% who were 65 years of age or older. The median age was 36 years. For every 100 females, there were 103.20 males. For every 100 females age 18 and over, there were 102.50 males.

The median income for a household in the county was $42,700, and the median income for a family was $51,813. Males had a median income of $32,218 versus $22,329 for females. The per capita income for the county was $18,379. About 4.10% of families and 7.00% of the population were below the poverty line, including 6.20% of those under age 18 and 6.80% of those age 65 or over.

== Communities ==
=== Cities ===
- Milford
- Seward (county seat)

=== Villages ===
- Beaver Crossing
- Bee
- Cordova
- Garland
- Goehner
- Pleasant Dale
- Staplehurst
- Utica

=== Census-designated place ===
- Tamora

=== Unincorporated communities ===
- Grover
- Ruby

=== Ghost town ===
- Pittsburg

== Politics and government ==
=== Civil asset forfeiture ===
The county engages in extensive civil asset forfeiture. Having fewer than 18,000 people, it accounted for at least 90 cases in the last decade, one-third of all civil forfeiture cases in the state during that period and double that of any other Nebraska county. From 2018 to 2023, the county obtained $7.5 million in forfeited cash. Nearly all of the civil forfeitures stem from traffic stops of out-of-state drivers on Interstate 80 where Seward County police give stopped drivers a choice to give up their cash with an "abandonment form" or refuse and be subject to felony charges; the routine seizures never result in convictions of drivers, raising questions about the intent of the forfeitures. This practice continues despite 2016 state law LB 1106, meant to stop it by first requiring a criminal conviction for illegal drugs, child pornography, or illegal gambling, and establishing new reporting requirements and transfer regulations for seizures or forfeitures. However, loopholes in the law still allow seizure during a traffic stop if police believe the cash is connected to drugs, even if no drugs are found in the vehicle, a tactic that is used routinely by Seward County police. A bill introduced in February 2024 by Nebraska legislator Tom Brewer, LB 916, intends to ban civil forfeiture in the state entirely, requiring in all cases that prosecutors use the criminal justice process, rather than civil courts, to seize property.

=== Voting history ===
Seward County voters are reliably Republican. In only one national election since 1936 has the county selected the Democratic Party candidate (as of 2024).

United States presidential election results for Seward County, Nebraska
Year	Republican		Democratic		Third party(ies)	
Year	No.	%	No.	%	No.	%
1900	1,937	50.30%	1,865	48.43%	49	1.27%
1904	2,243	61.64%	1,027	28.22%	369	10.14%
1908	1,930	48.21%	2,029	50.69%	44	1.10%
1912	788	23.29%	1,573	46.48%	1,023	30.23%
1916	1,855	50.11%	1,797	48.54%	50	1.35%
1920	3,690	69.98%	1,497	28.39%	86	1.63%
1924	2,797	49.21%	1,848	32.51%	1,039	18.28%
1928	3,539	59.68%	2,367	39.92%	24	0.40%
1932	2,298	34.97%	4,208	64.04%	65	0.99%
1936	3,123	44.37%	3,866	54.92%	50	0.71%
1940	4,117	61.95%	2,529	38.05%	0	0.00%
1944	3,721	64.11%	2,083	35.89%	0	0.00%
1948	2,916	56.18%	2,274	43.82%	0	0.00%
1952	4,257	71.64%	1,685	28.36%	0	0.00%
1956	3,688	65.88%	1,910	34.12%	0	0.00%
1960	3,588	63.14%	2,095	36.86%	0	0.00%
1964	2,221	39.89%	3,347	60.11%	0	0.00%
1968	2,939	60.59%	1,658	34.18%	254	5.24%
1972	3,707	63.98%	2,087	36.02%	0	0.00%
1976	3,220	54.12%	2,610	43.87%	120	2.02%
1980	3,527	59.13%	1,803	30.23%	635	10.65%
1984	3,983	67.09%	1,911	32.19%	43	0.72%
1988	3,472	55.89%	2,690	43.30%	50	0.80%
1992	3,060	44.12%	2,121	30.58%	1,755	25.30%
1996	3,479	51.86%	2,432	36.25%	798	11.89%
2000	4,457	63.53%	2,250	32.07%	309	4.40%
2004	5,353	70.76%	2,114	27.94%	98	1.30%
2008	4,647	61.72%	2,703	35.90%	179	2.38%
2012	5,003	66.06%	2,386	31.51%	184	2.43%
2016	5,454	68.85%	1,875	23.67%	593	7.49%
2020	6,490	70.55%	2,438	26.50%	271	2.95%
2024	6,667	72.15%	2,388	25.84%	185	2.00%

== See also ==
- National Register of Historic Places listings in Seward County, Nebraska
