= Milford, Nebraska =

City in Seward County, Nebraska, United States

- City
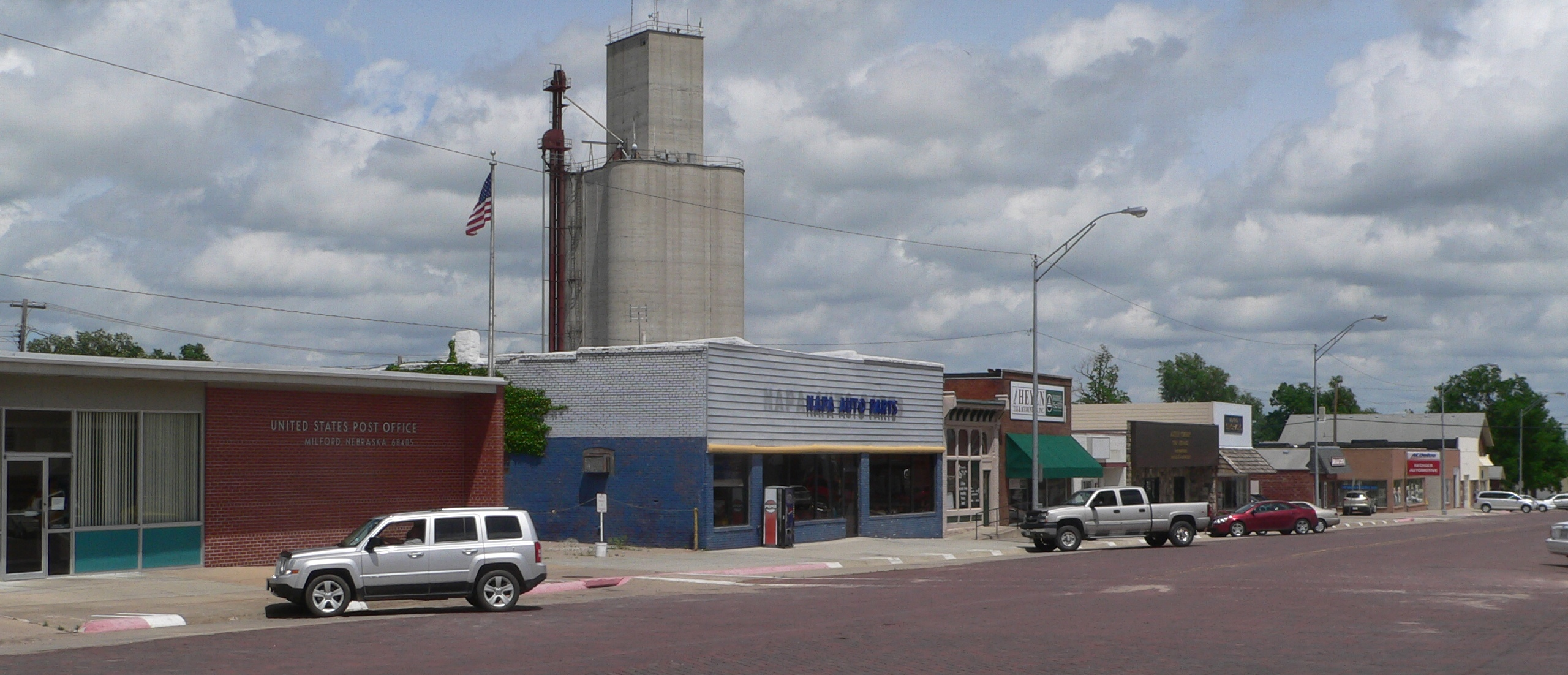
- Downtown Milford: First Street, May 2013

- Flag

- Location of Milford, Nebraska
- Coordinates: 40°46′20″N 97°03′12″W
- Country: United States
- State: Nebraska
- County: Seward

Area
  - Total: 0.82 sq mi (2.13 km^{2})
  - Land: 0.81 sq mi (2.11 km^{2})
  - Water: 0.0077 sq mi (0.02 km^{2})
- Elevation: 1,467 ft (447 m)

Population (2020)
  - Total: 2,155
  - Density: 2,651.0/sq mi (1,023.55/km^{2})
- Time zone: UTC-6 (Central (CST))
  - Summer (DST): UTC-5 (CDT)
- ZIP code: 68405
- Area code: 402
- FIPS code: 31-32060
- GNIS feature ID: 2395326
- Website: https://www.milfordne.gov/

Milford is a city in Seward County, Nebraska, United States. It is part of the Lincoln, Nebraska Metropolitan Statistical Area. The population was 2,155 at the 2020 census.

== History ==
Milford was platted in 1866. It took its name from a mill at a ford on the Blue River.

== Geography ==
According to the United States Census Bureau, the city has a total area of 0.79 square miles (2.05 km^{2}), of which 0.78 square miles (2.02 km^{2}) is land and 0.01 square miles (0.03 km^{2}) is water.

== Demographics ==
Historical population
Census	Pop.	Note	%±
1880	402		—
1890	555		38.1%
1900	542		−2.3%
1910	716		32.1%
1920	792		10.6%
1930	832		5.1%
1940	759		−8.8%
1950	951		25.3%
1960	1,462		53.7%
1970	1,846		26.3%
1980	2,108		14.2%
1990	1,886		−10.5%
2000	2,070		9.8%
2010	2,090		1.0%
2020	2,155		3.1%
U.S. Decennial Census; 2012 Estimate

=== 2020 census ===
As of the 2020 census, Milford had a population of 2,155. The median age was 33.1 years. 23.0% of residents were under the age of 18 and 16.0% were 65 years of age or older. For every 100 females, there were 116.1 males, and for every 100 females age 18 and over, there were 121.6 males.

There were 756 households, of which 30.0% had children under the age of 18 living in them. Of all households, 55.7% were married-couple households, 17.1% were households with a male householder and no spouse or partner present, and 23.9% were households with a female householder and no spouse or partner present. About 29.3% of all households were made up of individuals, and 14.3% had someone living alone who was 65 years of age or older.

The population density was 2,727.8 inhabitants per square mile (1,053.2/km^{2}). There were 829 housing units at an average density of 1,049.4 units per square mile (405.2 units/km^{2}), of which 8.8% were vacant. The homeowner vacancy rate was 1.7% and the rental vacancy rate was 7.9%.

0.0% of residents lived in urban areas, while 100.0% lived in rural areas.

Racial composition as of the 2020 census
Race	Number	Percent
White	1,978	91.8%
Black or African American	10	0.5%
American Indian and Alaska Native	13	0.6%
Asian	12	0.6%
Native Hawaiian and Other Pacific Islander	1	0.0%
Some other race	30	1.4%
Two or more races	111	5.2%
Hispanic or Latino (of any race)	64	3.0%

=== 2010 census ===
As of the 2010 census, there were 2,090 people, 770 households, and 494 families living in the city. The population density was 2,679.5 inhabitants per square mile (1,034.6/km^{2}). There were 843 housing units at an average density of 1,080.8 units per square mile (417.3 units/km^{2}). The racial makeup of the city was 97.4% White, 0.3% African American, 0.4% Native American, 0.2% Asian, 0.7% from other races, and 1.0% from two or more races. Hispanic or Latino of any race were 1.6% of the population.

There were 770 households, of which 30.6% had children under the age of 18 living with them, 55.6% were married couples living together, 4.8% had a female householder with no husband present, 3.8% had a male householder with no wife present, and 35.8% were non-families. 29.0% of all households were made up of individuals, and 13.5% had someone living alone who was 65 years of age or older. The average household size was 2.39 and the average family size was 2.97.

The median age in the city was 31.7 years. 22.2% of residents were under the age of 18; 21.1% were between the ages of 18 and 24; 20% were from 25 to 44; 21.5% were from 45 to 64; and 15.4% were 65 years of age or older. The gender makeup of the city was 55.8% male and 44.2% female.

=== 2000 census ===
As of the census of 2000, there were 2,070 people, 722 households, and 464 families living in the city. The population density was 2,901.9 inhabitants per square mile (1,120.4/km^{2}). There were 770 housing units at an average density of 1,079.5 units per square mile (416.8 units/km^{2}). The racial makeup of the city was 97.83% White, 0.24% African American, 0.29% Native American, 0.05% Asian, 0.05% Pacific Islander, 0.68% from other races, and 0.87% from two or more races. Hispanic or Latino of any race were 1.50% of the population.

There were 722 households, out of which 30.2% had children under the age of 18 living with them, 56.1% were married couples living together, 5.7% had a female householder with no husband present, and 35.7% were non-families. 26.7% of all households were made up of individuals, and 10.9% had someone living alone who was 65 years of age or older. The average household size was 2.44 and the average family size was 2.99.

In the city, the population was spread out, with 21.7% under the age of 18, 24.9% from 18 to 24, 21.9% from 25 to 44, 16.5% from 45 to 64, and 15.0% who were 65 years of age or older. The median age was 28 years. For every 100 females, there were 132.1 males. For every 100 females age 18 and over, there were 140.5 males.

As of 2000 the median income for a household in the city was $37,039, and the median income for a family was $51,012. Males had a median income of $30,170 compared to $22,026 for females. The per capita income for the city was $16,217. About 4.6% of families and 10.6% of the population were below the poverty line, including 6.7% of those under age 18 and 11.2% of those age 65 or over.

== Government ==
Milford uses a city council consisting of six members plus the mayor. As of March 2020, the current mayor of Milford is James Stone.

== Education ==
Milford is the location of a campus of Southeast Community College. Originally established in Milford in 1941 as the Nebraska State Trade School, it became part of the new Southeast Technical Community College system in 1973. As of 2016, about 750 students were enrolled on the campus. Milford also has a High School where in 2025 The Milford Volleyball Team won at State In C-1 marking the first female state title in Milford History

== City Flag ==
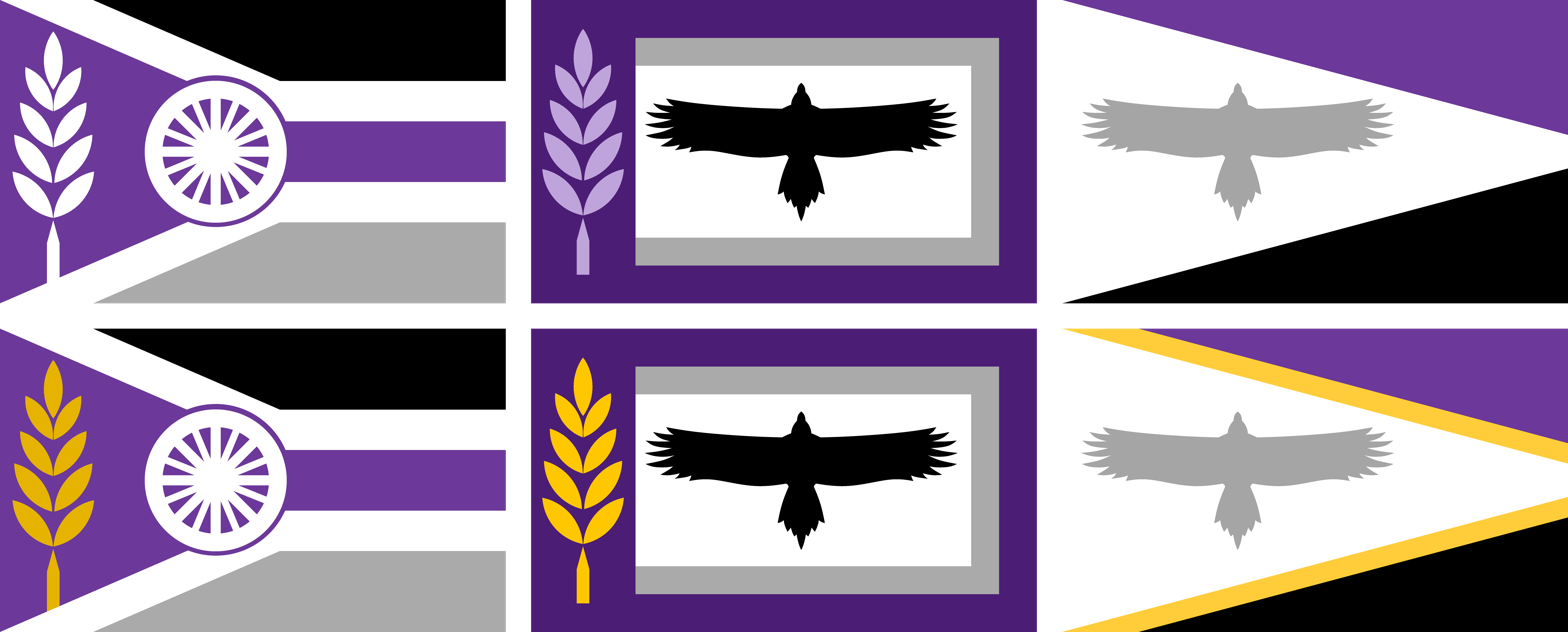
Final three and alternative designs for the flag.

Currently, Milford is one of only 11 cities in Nebraska to have an official flag. This flag was adopted on March 5, 2019, but had been worked on since July 2018. It was designed as an Eagle Scout Service Project by Boy Scout Nolan Eickhoff and was adopted at a city council meeting.

== Notable people ==
- Harry Culver, Hollywood real estate developer, founder of Culver City, California
- Victor Mills, chemical engineer
- Bill Rumler, baseball player

== See also ==
- List of municipalities in Nebraska
