= Staplehurst, Nebraska =

Village in Seward County, Nebraska, United States

- Village
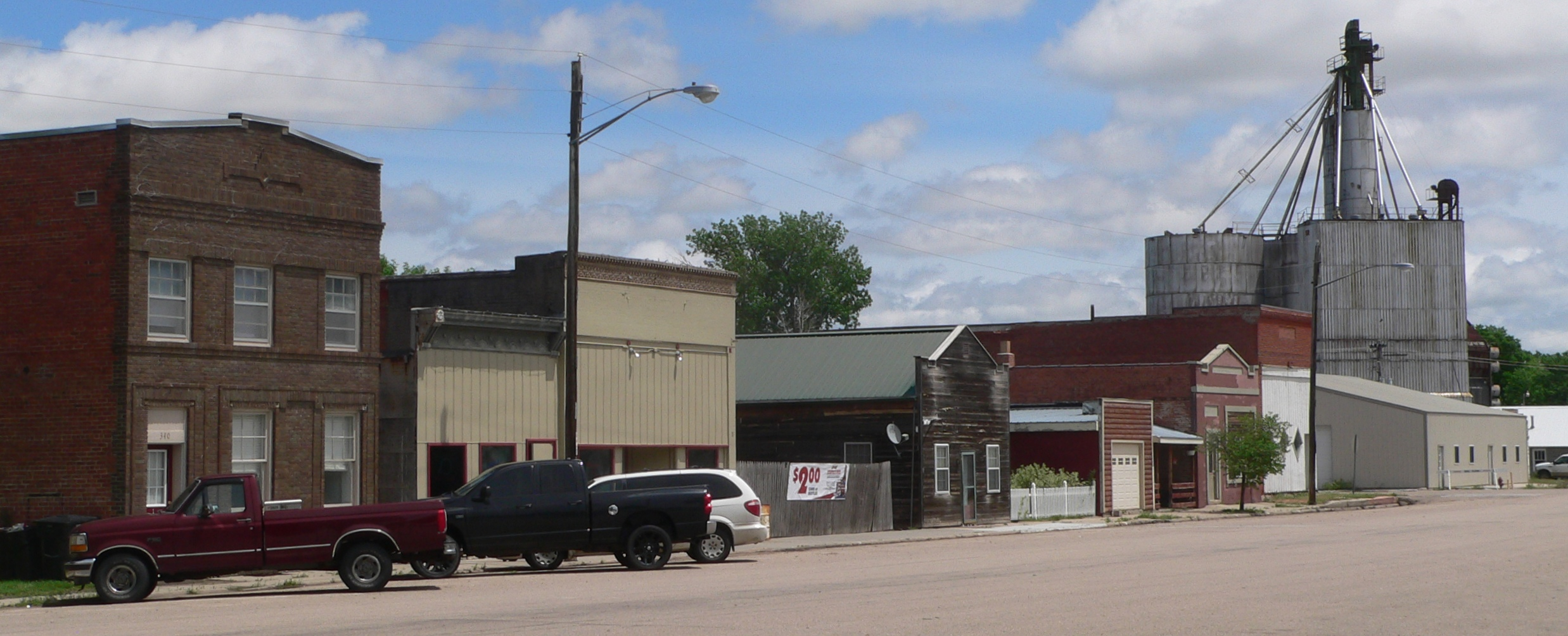
- Downtown Staplehurst: A Street, May 2013

- Location of Staplehurst, Nebraska
- Coordinates: 40°58′29″N 97°10′23″W
- Country: United States
- State: Nebraska
- County: Seward

Area
  - Total: 0.12 sq mi (0.32 km^{2})
  - Land: 0.12 sq mi (0.32 km^{2})
  - Water: 0 sq mi (0.00 km^{2})
- Elevation: 1,486 ft (453 m)

Population (2020)
  - Total: 236
  - Density: 1,890/sq mi (729.6/km^{2})
- Time zone: UTC-6 (Central (CST))
  - Summer (DST): UTC-5 (CDT)
- ZIP code: 68439
- Area code: 402
- FIPS code: 31-46835
- GNIS feature ID: 2399888
- Website: villageofstaplehurst.gov

Staplehurst is a village in Seward County, Nebraska, United States. It is part of the Lincoln, Nebraska Metropolitan Statistical Area. The population was 236 at the 2020 census.

== History ==
Staplehurst was established in 1879 when the railroad was extended to that point. A family of early settlers being natives of Staplehurst, England, caused the name to be selected.

== Geography ==
According to the United States Census Bureau, the village has a total area of 0.13 square miles (0.34 km^{2}), all land.

== Demographics ==
Historical population
| Census | Pop. | Note | %± |
|---|---|---|---|
| 1900 | 211 | | — |
| 1910 | 228 | | 8.1% |
| 1920 | 235 | | 3.1% |
| 1930 | 254 | | 8.1% |
| 1940 | 234 | | −7.9% |
| 1950 | 224 | | −4.3% |
| 1960 | 240 | | 7.1% |
| 1970 | 227 | | −5.4% |
| 1980 | 306 | | 34.8% |
| 1990 | 281 | | −8.2% |
| 2000 | 270 | | −3.9% |
| 2010 | 242 | | −10.4% |
| 2020 | 236 | | −2.5% |
U.S. Decennial Census

=== 2010 census ===
As of the census of 2010, there were 242 people, 97 households, and 66 families residing in the village. The population density was 1,861.5 inhabitants per square mile (718.7/km^{2}). There were 112 housing units at an average density of 861.5 per square mile (332.6/km^{2}). The racial makeup of the village was 98.3% White, 0.4% African American, and 1.2% from two or more races. Hispanic or Latino of any race were 0.8% of the population.

There were 97 households, of which 28.9% had children under the age of 18 living with them, 55.7% were married couples living together, 7.2% had a female householder with no husband present, 5.2% had a male householder with no wife present, and 32.0% were non-families. 27.8% of all households were made up of individuals, and 11.3% had someone living alone who was 65 years of age or older. The average household size was 2.49 and the average family size was 3.06.

The median age in the village was 40 years. 26.9% of residents were under the age of 18; 4.6% were between the ages of 18 and 24; 23.6% were from 25 to 44; 30.6% were from 45 to 64; and 14.5% were 65 years of age or older. The gender makeup of the village was 52.5% male and 47.5% female.

=== 2000 census ===
As of the census of 2000, there were 270 people, 108 households, and 73 families residing in the village. The population density was 1,983.7 inhabitants per square mile (765.9/km^{2}). There were 116 housing units at an average density of 852.3 per square mile (329.1/km^{2}). The racial makeup of the village was 97.41% White, 0.37% Asian, and 2.22% from two or more races. Hispanic or Latino of any race were 0.37% of the population.

There were 108 households, out of which 28.7% had children under the age of 18 living with them, 55.6% were married couples living together, 7.4% had a female householder with no husband present, and 32.4% were non-families. 28.7% of all households were made up of individuals, and 14.8% had someone living alone who was 65 years of age or older. The average household size was 2.50 and the average family size was 3.11.

In the village, the population was spread out, with 24.4% under the age of 18, 10.7% from 18 to 24, 25.6% from 25 to 44, 25.9% from 45 to 64, and 13.3% who were 65 years of age or older. The median age was 37 years. For every 100 females, there were 100.0 males. For every 100 females age 18 and over, there were 110.3 males.

As of 2000 the median income for a household in the village was $38,542, and the median income for a family was $42,361. Males had a median income of $28,125 versus $18,125 for females. The per capita income for the village was $14,449. About 7.4% of families and 10.3% of the population were below the poverty line, including 17.6% of those under the age of eighteen and 12.9% of those 65 or over.

== Notable persons ==
- Coleen Gray - Actress, born Doris Jensen in Staplehurst
- Roger Wendt - Member of Iowa House of Representatives 2003 - 2011, born in Staplehurst 1933

== See also ==
- List of municipalities in Nebraska
