= Seward, Nebraska =

City in and county seat of Seward County, Nebraska, United States

- City
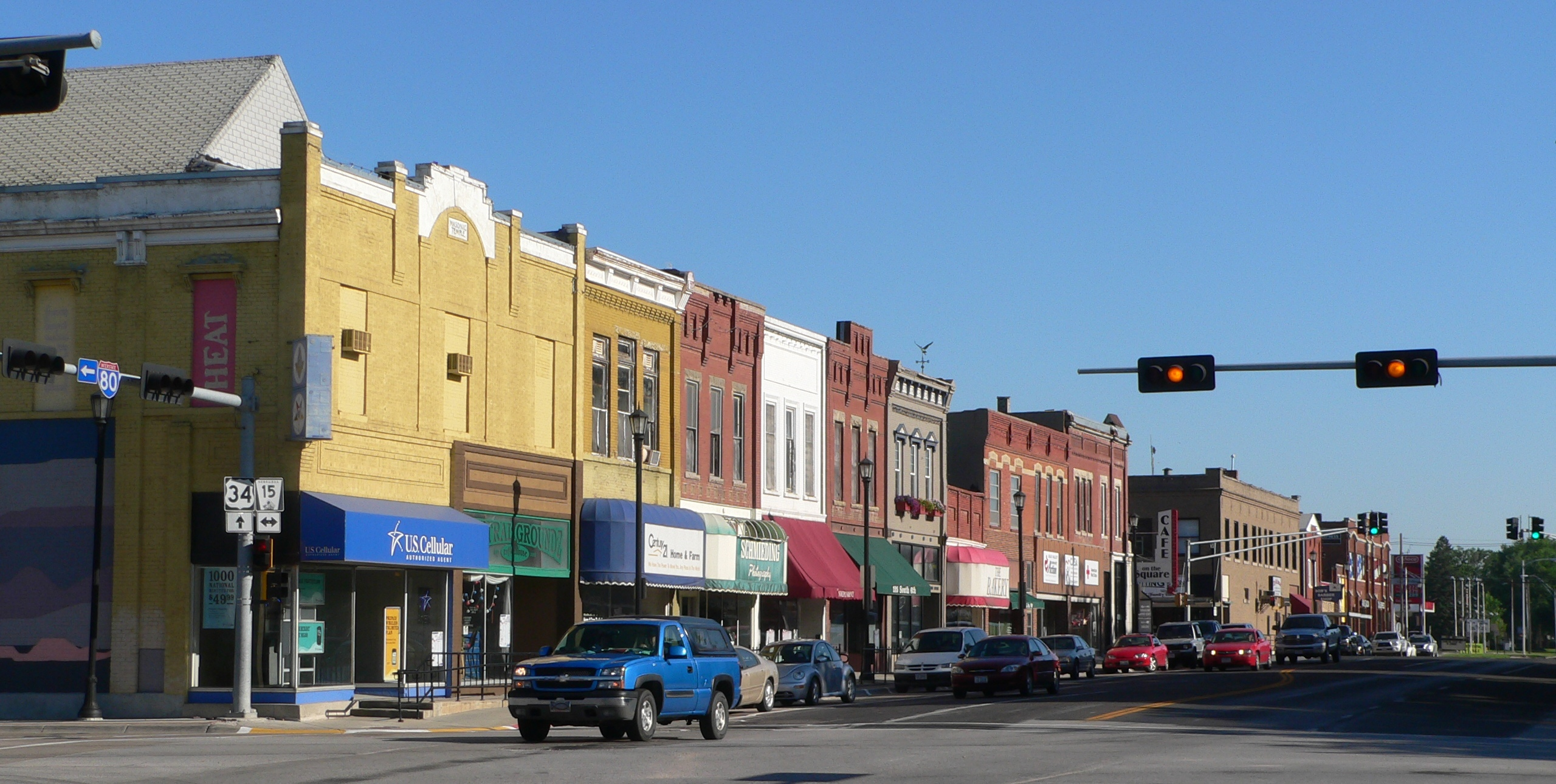
- Downtown Seward: west side of courthouse square, July 2010

- Flag

- Location of Seward within Seward County and Nebraska

- Location within the United States
- Coordinates: 40°54′40″N 97°5′49″W
- Country: United States
- State: Nebraska
- County: Seward

Area
  - Total: 4.49 sq mi (11.63 km^{2})
  - Land: 4.46 sq mi (11.54 km^{2})
  - Water: 0.035 sq mi (0.09 km^{2})
- Elevation: 1,493 ft (455 m)

Population (2020)
  - Total: 7,643
  - Density: 1,715.4/sq mi (662.31/km^{2})
- Time zone: UTC-6 (Central (CST))
  - Summer (DST): UTC-5 (CDT)
- ZIP code: 68434
- Area code: 402
- FIPS code: 31-44420
- GNIS feature ID: 2396580
- Website: cityofsewardne.gov

Seward is a city in and the county seat of Seward County, Nebraska, United States. The population was 7,643 at the 2020 census. Seward is part of the Lincoln, Nebraska, metropolitan area.

== History ==
Seward was platted in 1868. It was named from Seward County. The railroad was built through Seward in 1873.

== Geography ==
According to the United States Census Bureau, the city has a total area of 4.31 square miles (11.16 km^{2}), of which 4.27 square miles (11.06 km^{2}) is land and 0.04 square miles (0.10 km^{2}) is water.

=== Climate ===
Climate data for Seward, Nebraska (1991–2020 normals, extremes 1900–present)
Month	Jan	Feb	Mar	Apr	May	Jun	Jul	Aug	Sep	Oct	Nov	Dec	Year
Record high °F (°C)	74 (23)	80 (27)	90 (32)	98 (37)	103 (39)	107 (42)	114 (46)	111 (44)	105 (41)	98 (37)	87 (31)	81 (27)	114 (46)
Mean daily maximum °F (°C)	32.9 (0.5)	37.6 (3.1)	50.0 (10.0)	61.5 (16.4)	71.9 (22.2)	81.9 (27.7)	85.7 (29.8)	83.8 (28.8)	77.5 (25.3)	64.8 (18.2)	49.6 (9.8)	36.2 (2.3)	61.1 (16.2)
Daily mean °F (°C)	22.5 (−5.3)	26.8 (−2.9)	38.3 (3.5)	49.6 (9.8)	61.0 (16.1)	71.4 (21.9)	75.4 (24.1)	73.1 (22.8)	65.3 (18.5)	52.0 (11.1)	38.0 (3.3)	26.2 (−3.2)	50.0 (10.0)
Mean daily minimum °F (°C)	12.0 (−11.1)	16.1 (−8.8)	26.6 (−3.0)	37.6 (3.1)	50.2 (10.1)	60.9 (16.1)	65.2 (18.4)	62.4 (16.9)	53.0 (11.7)	39.3 (4.1)	26.4 (−3.1)	16.2 (−8.8)	38.8 (3.8)
Record low °F (°C)	−30 (−34)	−26 (−32)	−19 (−28)	5 (−15)	19 (−7)	36 (2)	42 (6)	37 (3)	20 (−7)	6 (−14)	−6 (−21)	−27 (−33)	−30 (−34)
Average precipitation inches (mm)	0.65 (17)	0.67 (17)	1.49 (38)	2.46 (62)	4.87 (124)	4.70 (119)	3.56 (90)	3.46 (88)	2.46 (62)	2.20 (56)	1.23 (31)	0.92 (23)	28.67 (728)
Average snowfall inches (cm)	5.4 (14)	6.0 (15)	3.0 (7.6)	0.9 (2.3)	0.0 (0.0)	0.0 (0.0)	0.0 (0.0)	0.0 (0.0)	0.0 (0.0)	0.7 (1.8)	1.5 (3.8)	4.0 (10)	21.5 (55)
Average precipitation days (≥ 0.01 in)	4.6	4.5	6.4	9.2	10.8	9.0	7.8	7.8	6.8	6.5	4.1	3.9	81.4
Average snowy days (≥ 0.1 in)	3.2	3.1	1.6	0.5	0.0	0.0	0.0	0.0	0.0	0.1	1.4	2.8	12.7
Source: NOAA

== Demographics ==
Historical population
Census	Pop.	Note	%±
1880	1,525		—
1890	2,108		38.2%
1900	1,970		−6.5%
1910	2,106		6.9%
1920	2,368		12.4%
1930	2,737		15.6%
1940	2,826		3.3%
1950	3,154		11.6%
1960	4,208		33.4%
1970	5,294		25.8%
1980	5,713		7.9%
1990	5,634		−1.4%
2000	6,319		12.2%
2010	6,964		10.2%
2020	7,643		9.8%
U.S. Decennial Census

=== 2020 census ===
As of the 2020 census, Seward had a population of 7,643. The median age was 34.0 years. 22.4% of residents were under the age of 18 and 18.2% of residents were 65 years of age or older. For every 100 females there were 94.7 males, and for every 100 females age 18 and over there were 92.3 males age 18 and over.

97.8% of residents lived in urban areas, while 2.2% lived in rural areas.

There were 2,829 households in Seward, of which 31.4% had children under the age of 18 living in them. Of all households, 60.3% were family households, 51.6% were married-couple households, 17.1% were households with a male householder and no spouse or partner present, and 26.7% were households with a female householder and no spouse or partner present. About 31.4% of all households were made up of individuals and 16.0% had someone living alone who was 65 years of age or older. The average household size was 2.3 and the average family size was 2.9.

There were 3,009 housing units, of which 6.0% were vacant. The homeowner vacancy rate was 0.3% and the rental vacancy rate was 8.8%.

Racial composition as of the 2020 census
Race	Number	Percent
White	7,132	93.3%
Black or African American	72	0.9%
American Indian and Alaska Native	23	0.3%
Asian	30	0.4%
Native Hawaiian and Other Pacific Islander	3	0.0%
Some other race	81	1.1%
Two or more races	302	4.0%
Hispanic or Latino (of any race)	287	3.8%

=== Income and poverty ===
The 2016–2020 5-year American Community Survey estimates show that the median household income was $66,190 (with a margin of error of +/- $7,523) and the median family income $92,260 (+/- $6,779). Males had a median income of $40,676 (+/- $8,526) versus $20,585 (+/- $8,626) for females. The median income for those above 16 years old was $27,047 (+/- $3,169). Approximately, 4.3% of families and 9.3% of the population were below the poverty line, including 4.1% of those under the age of 18 and 3.8% of those ages 65 or over.

=== 2010 census ===
At the 2010 census there were 6,964 people, 2,521 households, and 1,653 families living in the city. The population density was 1,630.9 inhabitants per square mile (629.7/km^{2}). There were 2,796 housing units at an average density of 654.8 per square mile (252.8/km^{2}). The racial makeup of the city was 96.8% White, 0.6% African American, 0.4% Native American, 0.6% Asian, 0.3% from other races, and 1.4% from two or more races. Hispanic or Latino people of any race were 1.9%.

Of the 2,521 households 32.1% had children under the age of 18 living with them, 55.0% were married couples living together, 7.3% had a female householder with no husband present, 3.2% had a male householder with no wife present, and 34.4% were non-families. 30.2% of households were one person and 15.4% were one person aged 65 or older. The average household size was 2.39 and the average family size was 2.98.

The median age was 32.4 years. 22.6% of residents were under the age of 18; 18.8% were between the ages of 18 and 24; 21.5% were from 25 to 44; 22% were from 45 to 64; and 15.1% were 65 or older. The gender makeup of the city was 48.1% male and 51.9% female.

=== 2000 census ===
At the 2000 census, there were 6,319 people, 2,281 households, and 1,494 families living in the city. The population density was 1,930.9 inhabitants per square mile (745.5/km^{2}). There were 2,415 housing units at an average density of 737.9 per square mile (284.9/km^{2}). The racial makeup of the city was 97.97% White, 0.46% African American, 0.13% Native American, 0.47% Asian, 0.36% from other races, and 0.60% from two or more races. Hispanic or Latino people of any race were 0.98% of the population.

Of the 2,281 households 31.7% had children under the age of 18 living with them, 55.6% were married couples living together, 7.3% had a female householder with no husband present, and 34.5% were non-families. 29.8% of households were one person and 16.2% were one person aged 65 or older. The average household size was 2.39 and the average family size was 2.99.

The age distribution was 22.6% under the age of 18, 20.1% from 18 to 24, 22.9% from 25 to 44, 17.9% from 45 to 64, and 16.5% 65 or older. The median age was 32 years. For every 100 females, there were 90.7 males. For every 100 females age 18 and over, there were 86.4 males.

The median household income was $41,264, and the median family income was $54,808. Males had a median income of $33,828 versus $22,231 for females. The per capita income for the city was $17,668. About 4.1% of families and 6.6% of the population were below the poverty line, including 4.6% of those under age 18 and 5.3% of those age 65 or over.

== Fourth of July City ==
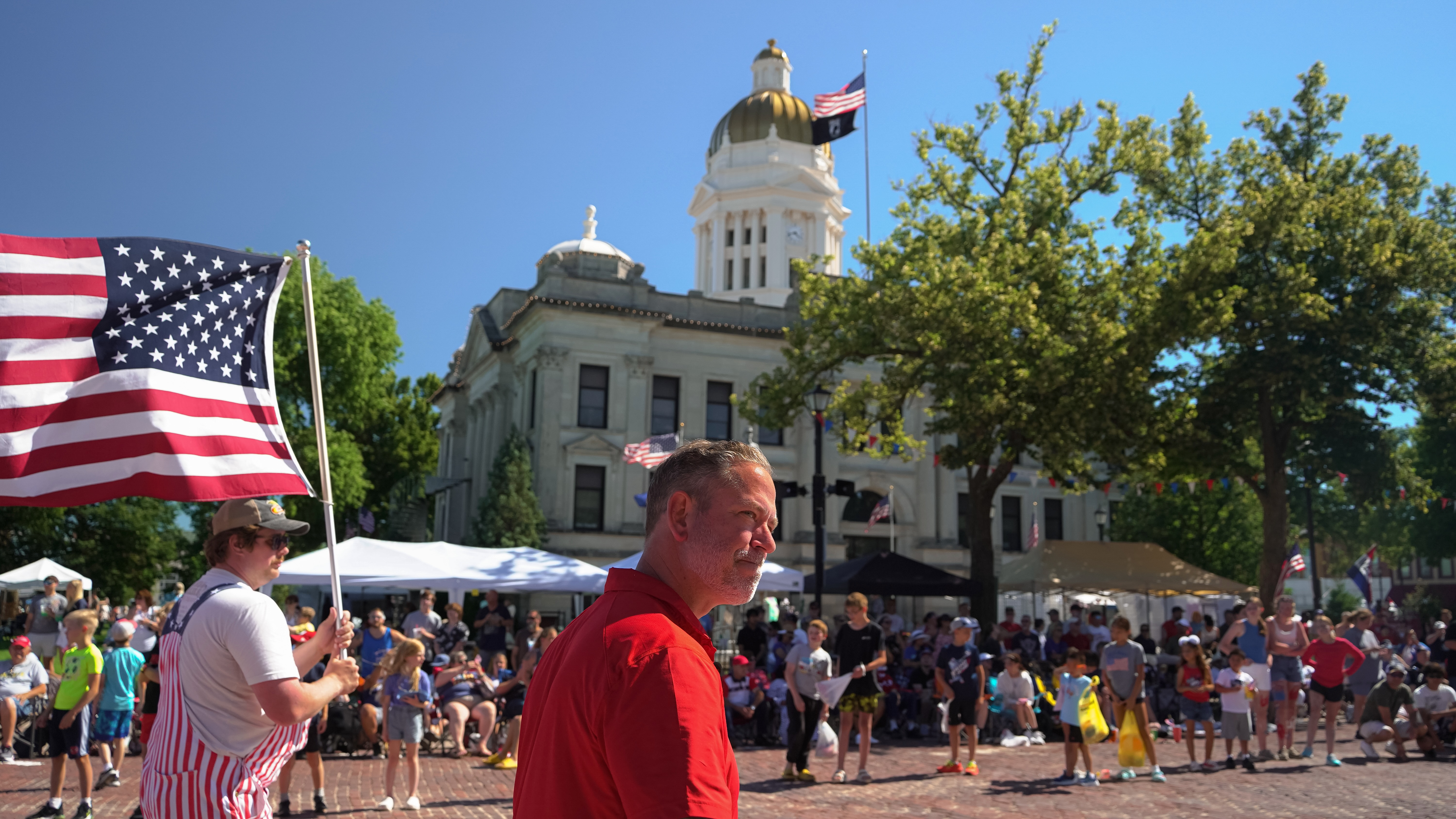
2024 celebration at County showing county courthouse

Seward has celebrated US Independence Day on July 4 almost every year since 1868. Before the automobile came into general use, special trains were run to bring people to the event. In 1973, Governor J. James Exon issued a proclamation designating Seward "Nebraska's Official 4th of July City". In 1976, the city was chosen to host Nebraska's July 4 celebrations for the United States Bicentennial. In 1979, a resolution in the US Congress named Seward "America's Official Fourth of July City—Small Town USA". Recent attendance has been estimated at 40,000.

== Education ==
Seward Public Schools is the only public district in the city. It operates Seward Elementary School, Seward Middle School, and Seward High School. In addition, St. John Lutheran Elementary and Junior High School provide a LCMS Lutheran education and St. Vincent de Paul provides a Roman Catholic education.

Concordia University and St. Gregory the Great Seminary, which trains future Catholic clergy, are located in Seward.

== Economy ==
Major employers in Seward include Tenneco, Concordia University, Hughes Brothers Inc. and Seward Memorial Hospital (Memorial Health Care Systems.

== Sports ==
Seward was home to minor league baseball. From 1910 to 1913, the Seward Statesmen played as members of the Class D level Nebraska State League. In May 1913, Seward was struck by a deadly tornado and the franchise was relocated during the season to become the Beatrice Milkskimmers. The Seward Statesmen played home games at Fairgrounds Park.

== Notable people ==
- Seth Christian, filmmaker
- Theodore C. Diers, Wyoming state representative and senator
- John Folda, bishop of the Roman Catholic Diocese of Fargo
- Joel D. Heck, Lutheran theologian
- Qveen Herby, (Amy Renee Heidemann Noonan) rapper, singer
- Sam Koch, professional football player
- Mark Kolterman, Nebraska state legislator
- Reinhold Marxhausen, artist
- Quentin Neujahr, professional football player
- Andrea von Kampen, musician
- Francis Vreeland, painter
- Thad Weber, baseball player
- Bub Weller, professional football player

== See also ==
- List of municipalities in Nebraska
