= Quindara Oliver Dodge =

American dietitian

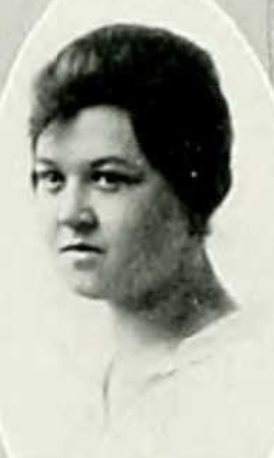
- Quindara Oliver (later Dodge), from the 1918 yearbook of Michigan State College
- Born: Quindara Oliver; May 3, 1897; Pennsylvania, U.S.
- Died: August 8, 1978 (aged 81); Massachusetts, U.S.
- Occupations: Dietitian, college professor

Quindara Oliver Dodge (May 3, 1897 – August 1978) was an American dietitian based in Boston. She was a professor of institution management at Simmons College beginning in 1931, and president of the American Dietetic Association from 1933 to 1934.

== Early life and education ==
Oliver was born in Pennsylvania and raised in Lapeer, Michigan, the daughter of William Loveridge Oliver and Gertrude Carroll Oliver. She graduated from Lapeer High School, and earned a bachelor's degree in home economics from Michigan State College in 1918. She pursued further studies at Columbia University.

== Career ==
Dodge was a "nationally known dietitian" by 1929. She was a professor of institution management at Simmons College in Boston beginning in 1931. She was also director of the vocational training department of the Women's Educational and Industrial Union. She was president of the American Dietetic Association from 1933 to 1934. "Mrs. Dodge is not at all the austere, coldly professional sort of person you would expect of one bearing so many impressive titles," a 1934 report assured readers.

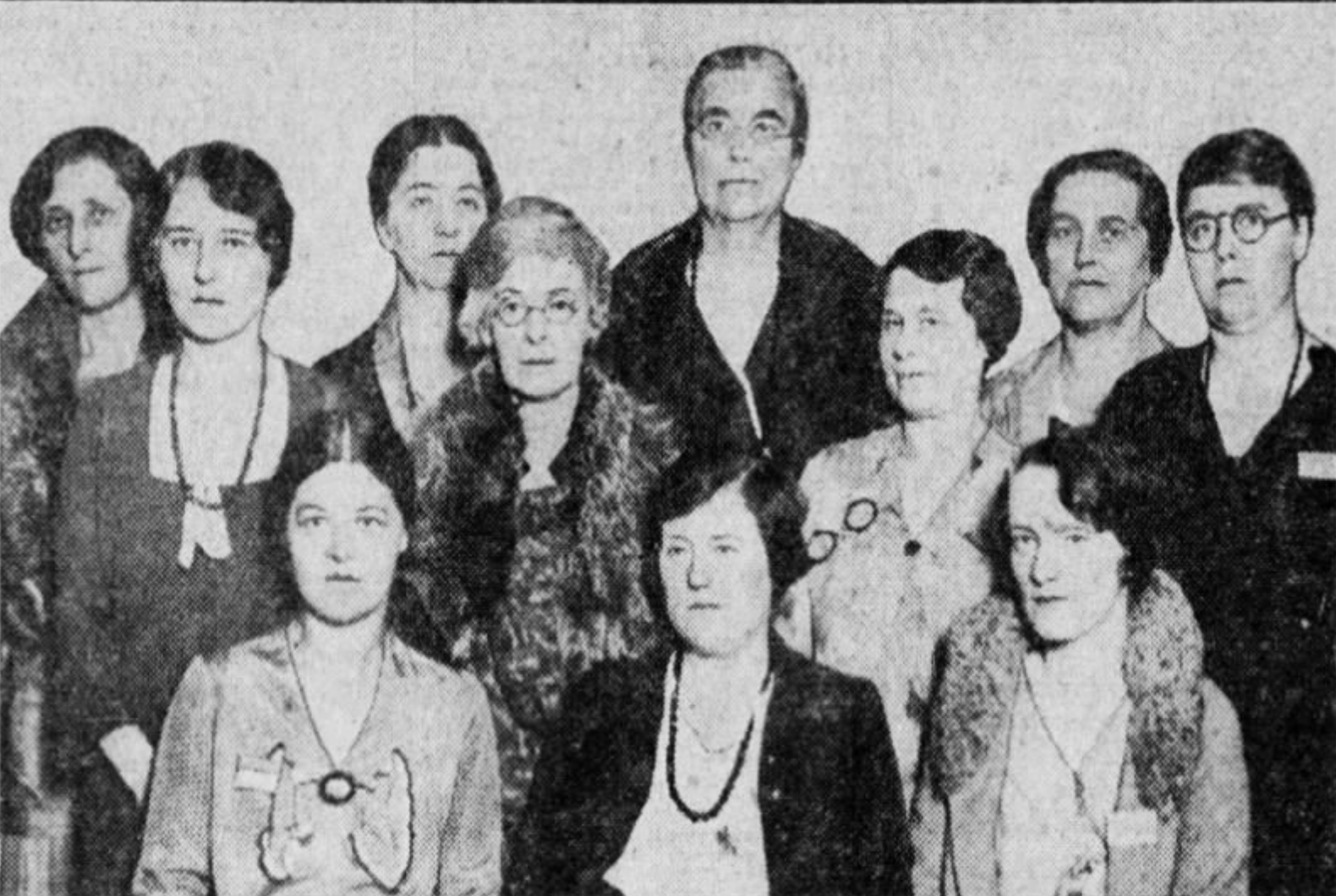
Dietitians at a 1929 meeting; front row: Quindara Oliver Dodge, Anne E. Boller, Katherine M. Thoma. Middle row: Ruth Cooley, Mary S. Rose, Lenna F. Cooper, Helen Anderson. Back row: Emma Feeney, Clyde Schuman, Abby Lillian Marlatt, Martha Koehne

Dodge spoke about changing patterns of consumption and new methods of packaging milk and curing hams to the Texas State Dietetic Association in 1938. In 1944 she addressed the Springfield Nutrition Bureau on worker nutrition and industrial cafeterias. In 1947 she was honored by Michigan State College as an outstanding home economics alumna.

Dodge was a charter member of the Boston chapter of Zonta International, when it formed in 1927.

== Publications ==
- "Where Administrators Come From" (1937)
- "Menu Planning and Food Cost Control" (1940)
- "Institution Management and Professional Success" (1940)
- "Management Control in Industrial Cafeterias" (1944)
- "The Administrative Dietitian in Industrial Feeding" (1946)
- "The Food Administrator: A Product of Modern Living" (1949, with Alberta Macfarlane and Mary deGarmo Bryan)

== Personal life ==
Oliver married electrical engineer Chester Carlton Dodge in 1928. They lived in Waban, Massachusetts, and had a daughter, also named Quindara. Her husband died in 1971, and Dodge died in 1978, at the age of 81. The Academy of Nutrition and Dietetics Foundation has a scholarship named for Dodge.
