= Fairbury, Nebraska =

- City
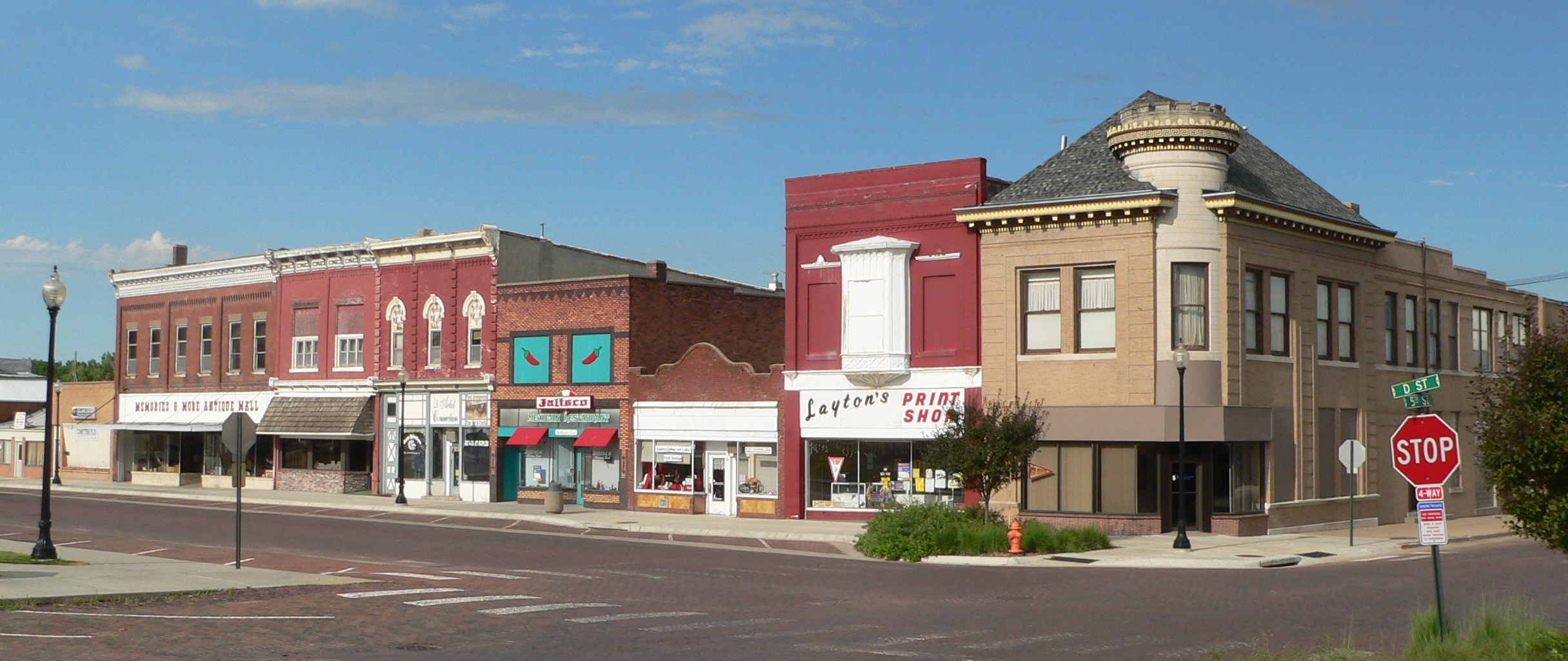
- Downtown: west side of D Street

- Location of Fairbury, Nebraska
- Coordinates: 40°08′42″N 97°10′35″W
- Country: United States
- State: Nebraska
- County: Jefferson

Government
  - Mayor: Kelly Davis

Area
  - Total: 2.54 sq mi (6.58 km^{2})
  - Land: 2.54 sq mi (6.57 km^{2})
  - Water: 0.0039 sq mi (0.01 km^{2})
- Elevation: 1,414 ft (431 m)

Population (2020)
  - Total: 3,970
  - Density: 1,565.6/sq mi (604.48/km^{2})
- Time zone: UTC-6 (Central (CST))
  - Summer (DST): UTC-5 (CDT)
- ZIP code: 68352
- Area code: 402
- FIPS code: 31-16410
- GNIS feature ID: 2394728
- Website: fairburyne.org

Fairbury is a city in and the county seat of Jefferson County, Nebraska, United States. As of the 2020 census, Fairbury had a population of 3,970.

Fairbury has been closely connected with railroading for much of its history. It was founded on the projected route of a railway, and grew as a shipping center. For nearly 80 years, it was the location of the Western Division headquarters of the Rock Island Railroad. Fairbury prospered with the Rock Island, and lost business and residents as the railroad declined.

== History ==
=== 19th century ===
In 1868, James B. Mattingly, a freighter originally from Kentucky, established a sawmill on the banks of the Little Blue River. Shortly thereafter, Woodford G. McDowell, a capitalist from Fairbury, Illinois, came to Nebraska to plat a town along the route of the St. Joseph and Denver City Railroad, which was to follow the Little Blue. In 1869, Mattingly and McDowell each contributed 80 acres (32 ha) for a new townsite, which they named after McDowell's hometown.

The new town grew rapidly, even before the railroad's arrival. In 1870, a population of 370 was reported; in that year, the Fairbury Gazette was established. A year later, Fairbury was chosen as the county seat; in early 1872, the city was incorporated. By this time, its businesses included three hotels and five blacksmith shops.

In 1872, the St. Joseph and Denver City reached Jefferson County. (The railroad was subsequently acquired by the Union Pacific and operated as the St. Joseph and Grand Island branch.) Fairbury became a shipping center: in the first half of 1873, it shipped 255 cars of grain and received 143 of lumber. By 1874, there were 600 residents; 44 businesses operated in the city.

An 1879 fire, "supposed to have been the work of an incendiary", destroyed an estimated fourteen buildings, for a loss of $50,000, much of it uninsured. However, recovery was swift, and many of the destroyed frame buildings were replaced by more modern brick and stone structures. By 1882, the city's population had grown to 1,600.

In 1885, the Campbell Brothers Circus began wintering in Fairbury. It continued to winter in and around the city until its closing in 1913. At its peak, the circus was the second-largest in the world.

In 1886, the Chicago, Rock Island and Pacific Railroad reached Fairbury. The city lay at the junction of the Rock Island's north-south and east-west lines; because of this, it was designated the headquarters of the railroad's Western Division. An extensive rail yard was constructed, including shops, storage and maintenance facilities, switching yards, and an 18-stall roundhouse. The railroad had a major impact on Fairbury: by 1890, the population had grown to 2,630.

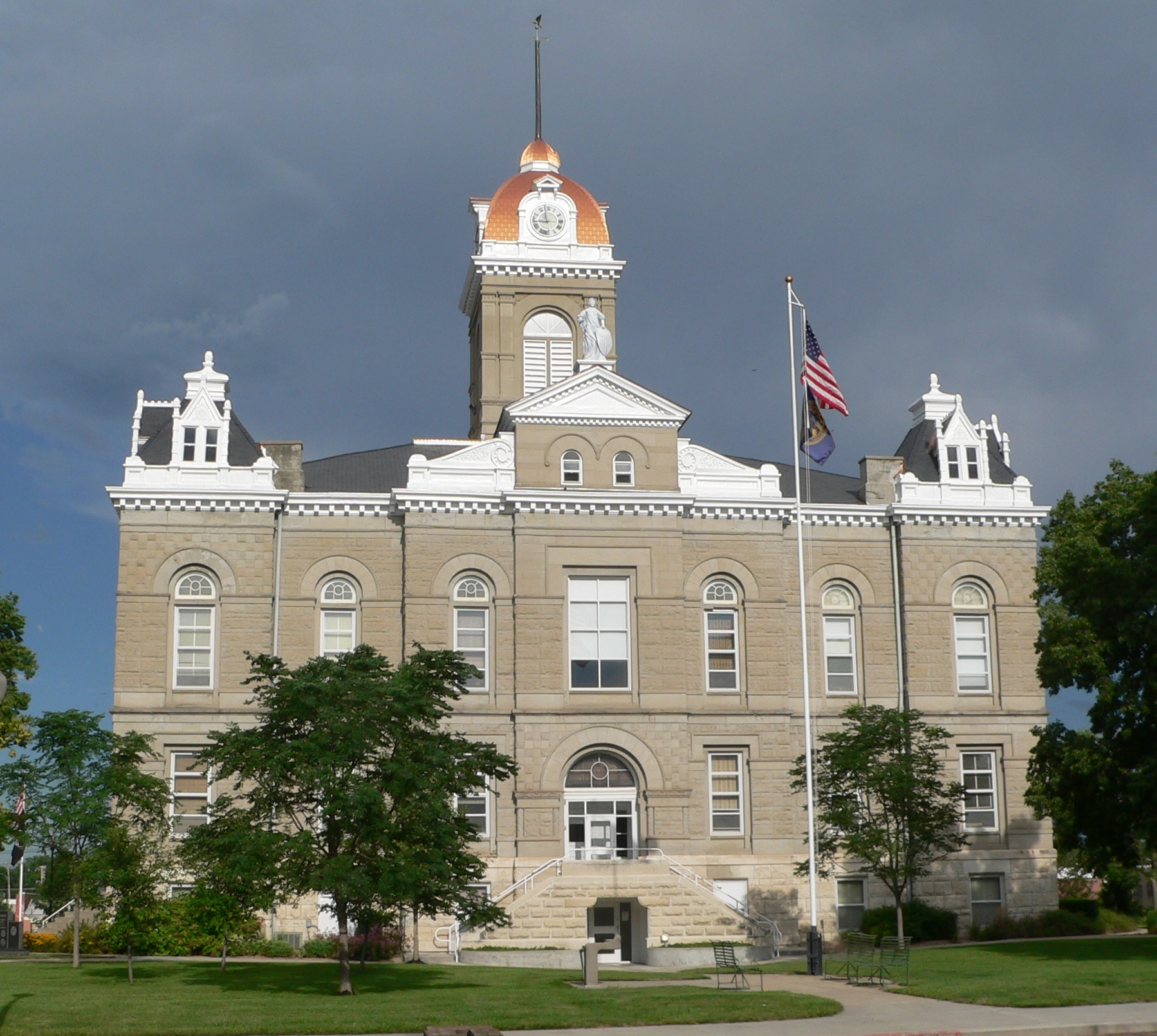
Jefferson County courthouse

The brick courthouse had survived the fire of 1879; but soon thereafter, it proved too small to handle the county's increasing business and store its growing records. In 1882, the county began renting the top two floors of the newly constructed Opera House, and moved its offices there; but this too was quickly outgrown. In 1889, a $60,000 bond issue for the construction of a new courthouse passed; the new Romanesque Revival building was completed in 1892.

Fairbury continued to prosper as the home of the Rock Island headquarters, which employed many locals directly and in supporting businesses. Commercial and residential development continued apace in Fairbury. Both of the city's banks survived the Panic of 1893. Boardwalks were replaced with brick sidewalks between 1892 and 1894; an electricity and waterworks powerhouse was constructed in 1895; and in 1898, electric street lights were installed. By 1900, the population had reached 3,140.

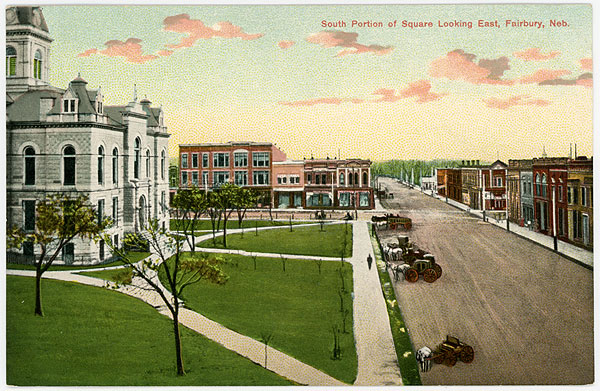
South side of courthouse square in early 1900s

=== 20th century ===
The decade from 1900 to 1910 saw the largest growth in Fairbury's history; the census of 1910 reported a population of 5,294, representing a sixty percent increase over the ten years.

A major fire in 1903 swept the commercial district, destroying almost the entire block south of the courthouse square; the only building to survive was the original brick courthouse. Within a year, however, the entire block had been rebuilt.

In 1909, E. J. Hested opened his dime store, The Fair Store, in one of the new buildings. Two years later, the name of the store was changed to Hested's. In 1925, the store moved into a new and larger building; the business expanded to over 150 stores in the Midwest and Mountain States before its acquisition by the J.J. Newberry chain in 1969.

The 1910s and 1920s were the peak years for the Rock Island Railroad, with fourteen passenger trains passing through Fairbury daily, and with hundreds of Fairbury residents on the payroll. To accommodate this traffic, the railroad constructed a new depot, at a cost of $40,000. The city's commercial district underwent a considerable expansion, including two movie theaters and several large retail stores. In 1915, civic leaders began promoting the brick paving of Fairbury's downtown streets; by 1930, there were 10 miles (16 km) of paved road. The 1920s and 1930s saw a proliferation of automobile-related businesses, such as garages, gas stations, and repair shops.

Fairbury was better situated than many communities to weather the Great Depression. Beside the railroad, it had a variety of industries, including the Fairbury Windmill Company, with a payroll of 50 people in 1930. The city continued to grow through the Depression, despite the difficulties of the Rock Island, which went into receivership in 1933 and did not emerge until 1948. The population of Fairbury peaked in 1950, at 6,395 residents.

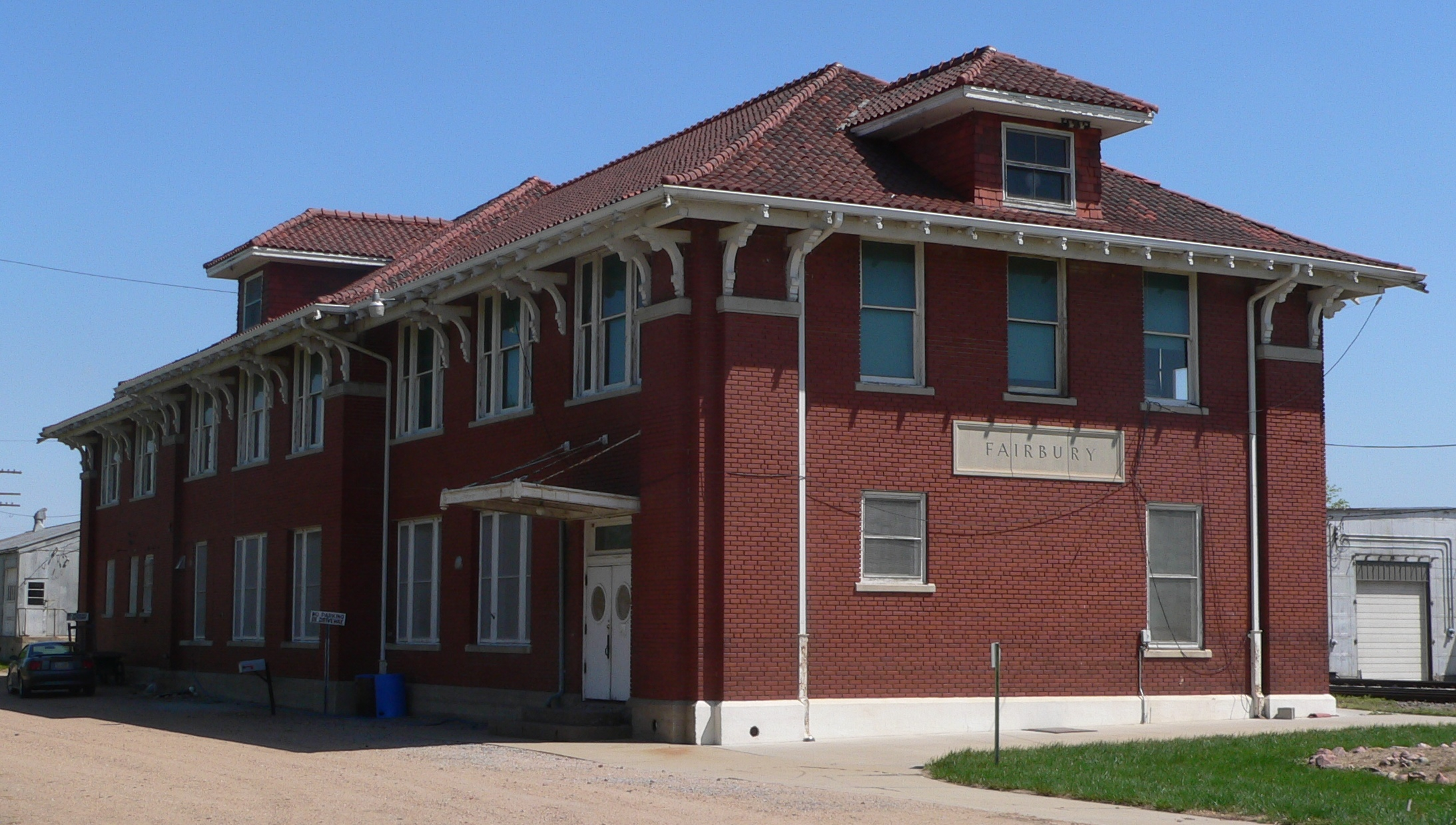
Fairbury Rock Island Depot Museum

The conversion of the Rock Island to diesel locomotives, completed by 1952, rendered portions of the Fairbury yards obsolete. The decrease in passenger railway traffic after World War II led to the reduction of service, the closing of stations, and the abandonment of track. In 1965, the Rock Island's Chicago-to-Denver Rocky Mountain Rocket train ceased to run through Fairbury; in that same year, the railway relocated its Western Division headquarters from Fairbury to Des Moines, Iowa. 1965 was also the last year in which the Rock Island reported a profit. In 1975, it again entered receivership. A 1979 strike, unsuccessfully mediated by President Jimmy Carter, was the final nail in the railroad's coffin. The railroad's routes were operated for 60 days by the Kansas City Terminal Railway, to allow shipping of the 1979 Midwestern harvest; but in 1980, service to Fairbury ceased, and the depot was abandoned.

== Geography ==
The city lies on the Little Blue River. According to the United States Census Bureau, the city has a total area of 2.40 square miles (6.22 km^{2}), all land.

=== Climate ===
Climate data for Fairbury, Nebraska (1991–2020 normals, extremes 1895–present)
Month	Jan	Feb	Mar	Apr	May	Jun	Jul	Aug	Sep	Oct	Nov	Dec	Year
Record high °F (°C)	78 (26)	80 (27)	95 (35)	103 (39)	103 (39)	111 (44)	114 (46)	114 (46)	112 (44)	100 (38)	86 (30)	80 (27)	114 (46)
Mean maximum °F (°C)	60.4 (15.8)	66.3 (19.1)	78.0 (25.6)	85.8 (29.9)	91.6 (33.1)	95.7 (35.4)	100.1 (37.8)	98.2 (36.8)	94.7 (34.8)	87.8 (31.0)	74.0 (23.3)	62.8 (17.1)	101.5 (38.6)
Mean daily maximum °F (°C)	36.1 (2.3)	41.1 (5.1)	53.1 (11.7)	63.8 (17.7)	73.6 (23.1)	83.8 (28.8)	88.4 (31.3)	86.4 (30.2)	79.5 (26.4)	66.9 (19.4)	52.0 (11.1)	39.8 (4.3)	63.7 (17.6)
Daily mean °F (°C)	25.1 (−3.8)	29.4 (−1.4)	40.3 (4.6)	50.7 (10.4)	61.5 (16.4)	71.9 (22.2)	76.6 (24.8)	74.5 (23.6)	66.4 (19.1)	53.6 (12.0)	39.8 (4.3)	29.0 (−1.7)	51.6 (10.9)
Mean daily minimum °F (°C)	14.1 (−9.9)	17.7 (−7.9)	27.5 (−2.5)	37.6 (3.1)	49.3 (9.6)	60.0 (15.6)	64.8 (18.2)	62.5 (16.9)	53.2 (11.8)	40.2 (4.6)	27.7 (−2.4)	18.2 (−7.7)	39.4 (4.1)
Mean minimum °F (°C)	−5.6 (−20.9)	−0.4 (−18.0)	9.2 (−12.7)	23.1 (−4.9)	35.3 (1.8)	48.3 (9.1)	54.7 (12.6)	52.4 (11.3)	38.7 (3.7)	23.0 (−5.0)	11.4 (−11.4)	0.2 (−17.7)	−9.6 (−23.1)
Record low °F (°C)	−25 (−32)	−42 (−41)	−18 (−28)	9 (−13)	25 (−4)	34 (1)	42 (6)	39 (4)	23 (−5)	8 (−13)	−9 (−23)	−26 (−32)	−42 (−41)
Average precipitation inches (mm)	0.77 (20)	0.96 (24)	1.70 (43)	2.96 (75)	5.10 (130)	5.00 (127)	4.33 (110)	3.55 (90)	3.10 (79)	2.39 (61)	1.45 (37)	1.08 (27)	32.39 (823)
Average snowfall inches (cm)	5.7 (14)	5.6 (14)	2.4 (6.1)	0.8 (2.0)	0.0 (0.0)	0.0 (0.0)	0.0 (0.0)	0.0 (0.0)	0.0 (0.0)	0.4 (1.0)	2.4 (6.1)	3.4 (8.6)	20.7 (53)
Average precipitation days (≥ 0.01 in)	5.0	5.2	6.9	9.8	11.7	9.9	9.4	8.6	7.5	6.7	5.4	4.8	90.9
Average snowy days (≥ 0.1 in)	3.2	3.1	1.4	0.4	0.0	0.0	0.0	0.0	0.0	0.2	1.2	2.3	11.8
Source: NOAA

== Demographics ==
Historical population
Census	Pop.	Note	%±
1880	1,251		—
1890	2,630		110.2%
1900	3,140		19.4%
1910	5,294		68.6%
1920	5,454		3.0%
1930	6,192		13.5%
1940	6,304		1.8%
1950	6,395		1.4%
1960	5,572		−12.9%
1970	5,265		−5.5%
1980	4,885		−7.2%
1990	4,335		−11.3%
2000	4,262		−1.7%
2010	3,942		−7.5%
2020	3,970		0.7%
U.S. Decennial Census; 2012 Estimate

With the decrease and eventual cessation of the Rock Island's activity, the population of Fairbury fell from its 1950 peak. In the 2010 U.S. census, it had declined to 3,942 residents. However, the city has remained the commercial, governmental, and retail center of the region.

=== 2020 census ===
As of the 2020 census, Fairbury had a population of 3,970. The median age was 42.2 years. 24.0% of residents were under the age of 18 and 23.3% of residents were 65 years of age or older. For every 100 females there were 94.8 males, and for every 100 females age 18 and over there were 92.2 males age 18 and over.

99.6% of residents lived in urban areas, while 0.4% lived in rural areas.

There were 1,710 households in Fairbury, of which 24.7% had children under the age of 18 living in them. Of all households, 39.4% were married-couple households, 22.7% were households with a male householder and no spouse or partner present, and 30.1% were households with a female householder and no spouse or partner present. About 39.6% of all households were made up of individuals and 20.7% had someone living alone who was 65 years of age or older.

There were 2,005 housing units, of which 14.7% were vacant. The homeowner vacancy rate was 4.2% and the rental vacancy rate was 12.9%.

Racial composition as of the 2020 census
Race	Number	Percent
White	3,542	89.2%
Black or African American	16	0.4%
American Indian and Alaska Native	42	1.1%
Asian	11	0.3%
Native Hawaiian and Other Pacific Islander	0	0.0%
Some other race	147	3.7%
Two or more races	212	5.3%
Hispanic or Latino (of any race)	291	7.3%

=== 2010 census ===
As of the census of 2010, there were 3,942 people, 1,782 households, and 1,007 families residing in the city. The population density was 1,642.5 inhabitants per square mile (634.2/km^{2}). There were 2,145 housing units at an average density of 893.8 per square mile (345.1/km^{2}). The racial makeup of the city was 95.9% White, 0.3% African American, 0.6% Native American, 0.4% Asian, 1.1% from other races, and 1.7% from two or more races. Hispanic or Latino of any race were 3.3% of the population.

There were 1,782 households, of which 25.1% had children under the age of 18 living with them, 42.0% were married couples living together, 10.0% had a female householder with no husband present, 4.4% had a male householder with no wife present, and 43.5% were non-families. 37.7% of all households were made up of individuals, and 20.3% had someone living alone who was 65 years of age or older. The average household size was 2.15 and the average family size was 2.79.

The median age in the city was 44.5 years. 22.1% of residents were under the age of 18; 6.8% were between the ages of 18 and 24; 21.7% were from 25 to 44; 25.6% were from 45 to 64; and 23.8% were 65 years of age or older. The gender makeup of the city was 47.3% male and 52.7% female.

=== 2000 census ===
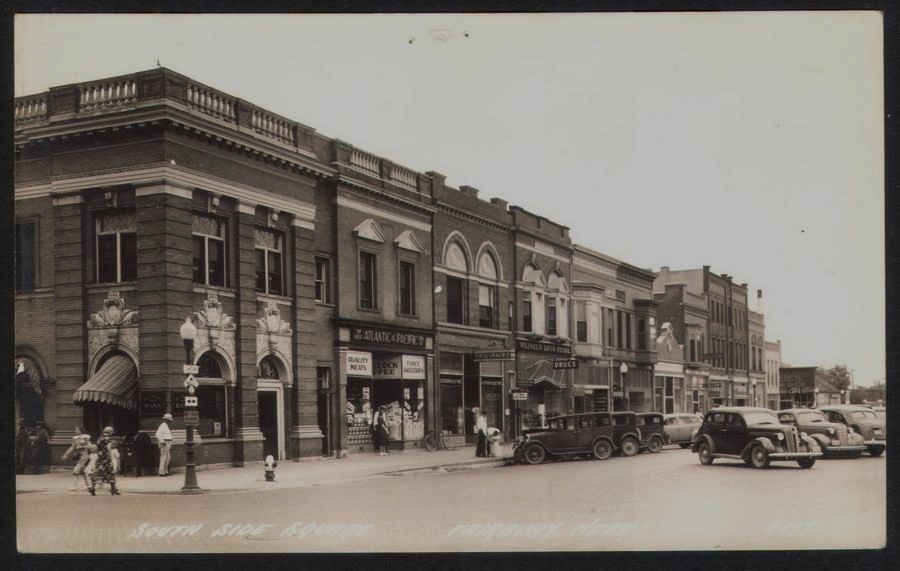
South side of the courthouse square in the late 1920s or early 1930s. The Harbine Bank building is in the left foreground. At the far right is the original brick courthouse, which survived the fires of 1879 and 1903.

As of the census of 2000, there were 4,262 people, 1,884 households, and 1,130 families residing in Fairbury. The population density was 2,227.2 inhabitants per square mile (859.9/km^{2}). There were 2,132 housing units at an average density of 1,114.1 per square mile (430.2/km^{2}). The racial makeup of the city was 97.89% White, 0.14% African American, 0.61% Native American, 0.19% Asian, 0.02% Pacific Islander, 0.63% from other races, and 0.52% from two or more races. Hispanic or Latino of any race were 1.85% of the population.

There were 1,884 households, of which 24.1% had children under the age of 18 living with them, 49.2% were married couples living together, 7.4% had a female householder with no husband present, and 40.0% were non-families. 35.4% of all households were made up of individuals, and 22.2% had someone living alone who was 65 years of age or older. The average household size was 2.17 and the average family size was 2.79.

The median age in Fairbury was 44 years. Persons under 18 years of age represented 21.5% of the population; 6.8% were aged from 18 to 24; 22.5%, from 25 to 44; 22.0%, from 45 to 64; and 27.3% of residents were 65 years of age or older. For every 100 females, there were 86.9 males; for every 100 females aged 18 and over, there were 81.7 males.

The median income for a Fairbury household was $29,261; the median income for a family was $37,778. Males had a median income of $26,955, versus $16,955 for females. The per capita income for the city was $17,337. About 10.2% of families and 10.2% of the population were below the poverty line, including 13.0% of those under age 18 and 8.6% of those age 65 or over.

== Economy ==
Thirteen manufacturing plants, with a total of 475 employees, are located in and near Fairbury. The largest among these are Endicott Clay Products, producing brick and tile in nearby Endicott, with 200 employees; Prairie View Industries, producing stainless steel and aluminum handicap ramps and food service equipment, with 80 employees; Fairbury Food Products, with 54 employees; and Tetra Micronutrients, manufacturing micronutrients for use in fertilizer and animal feed, with 47 employees. Other major local employers include Jefferson Community Health Center (193 employees), Fairbury Public Schools (154 employees), the City of Fairbury (120 employees), Farmers Co-op Elevator Co. (118 employees), and Heritage Nursing Home (90 employees). It is also home to Livingston Enterprises, Inc., which is headquartered in Fairbury, and all of their sites are within a 30 mile radius of the town.

Fairbury serves as the retail center of Jefferson County. The historic downtown continues to prosper, with a variety of specialty shops. Major retailing has tended to move toward the northeastern edge of the city, with the first Wal-Mart in Nebraska opening in 1982; with the move of Wal-Mart to a larger location, its site was redeveloped as an indoor mall. Other franchised business such as Dollar General, Orscheln Farm & Home, and Ace Hardware, have also located on the northeast.

== Sites of interest ==
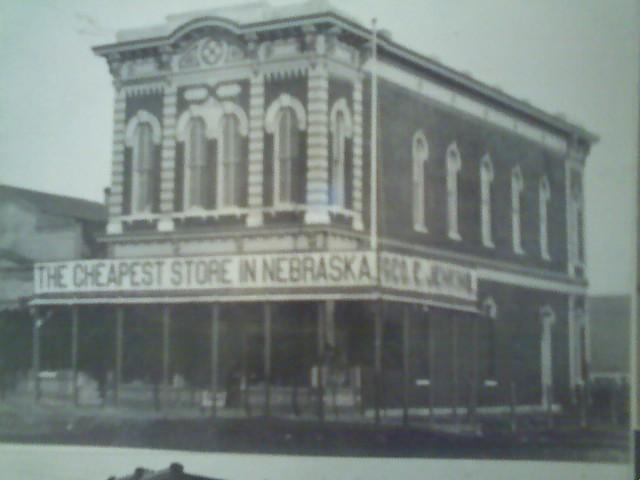
The Jenkins Dry Goods store, c. 1879. The store was built in 1875 and described by the Fairbury Gazette as the "finest edifice in town". It was one of the first permanent brick structures in Fairbury, and remains the least altered surviving example of Fairbury's first generation of buildings.

The former Rock Island depot is now operated as the Rock Island Railroad Depot Museum, dedicated to the railroad's history. The Fairbury City Museum, located in a former elementary school building, includes both indoor and outdoor displays pertaining to Fairbury's history.

A ten-block area of downtown Fairbury, including the courthouse square, is listed in the National Register of Historic Places as the Fairbury Commercial Historic District. Many of the buildings in the district have been little altered, and retain their original form and ornamentation almost intact. Three buildings remain from the first generation of Fairbury's downtown buildings, including the original Jefferson County courthouse and a false-front frame building; other architectural styles represented include Italianate, Queen Anne, a variety of revival styles, and 20th-century commercial architectural styles.

Rock Creek Station State Historical Park, located southeast of Fairbury, was a station on the Oregon-California Trail, and later served as a Pony Express station. Well-preserved wagon ruts from wagons on the trail are still visible at the park. In 1861, James Butler Hickok, who had not yet adopted the sobriquet "Wild Bill", was involved in a gunfight at Rock Creek Station, in which Hickok killed local rancher David McCanles. This was the first known killing in Hickok's career as a gunslinger.

== Education ==
Fairbury, a part of Fairbury Public Schools, has two public elementary schools: Central Elementary, with pupils from preschool through second grade; and Jefferson Intermediate, covering third through sixth grade. The two schools have an enrollment of about 480. There is a single public junior-senior high school, located on the former college grounds, straightforwardly named Fairbury Junior-Senior High School, with an enrollment of about 370.

== Media ==
Fairbury has two news sources: Fairbury News Now, which began in 2016, and the weekly Fairbury Journal-News. It also has two radio stations, both owned by Flood Communications: KUTT-FM, broadcasting in a country music format at 100,000 watts; and KGMT-AM, playing oldies.

== Transportation ==
Although the Rock Island no longer operates, Fairbury is still served by the Union Pacific Railroad. U.S. Highway 136 and Nebraska Highway 15 intersect in the city. It is 44 miles (71 km) from Interstate 80, the nearest Interstate highway. Fairbury Municipal Airport has a concrete runway long enough to land a small private jet, and a shorter turf runway.

== Notable people ==
- Dakota Cochrane, professional mixed martial artist and pornographic actor.
- Robert Vernon Denney, United States federal judge and Congressman
- Bill Doleman, professional sports broadcaster
- Lowell English, United States Marine Corps general who served in World War II, Korea and Vietnam.
- Lulu Grace Graves, first president of the Academy of Nutrition and Dietetics, 1917-1920
- Ira Hanford (1918–2009), jockey
- Doyle Lade, baseball player
- Forrest McPherson, football player
- Robert L. Scott, professor of communications studies
- Irene Worth, actress

== See also ==
- National Register of Historic Places listings in Jefferson County, Nebraska
