= Oyatsupan Bakers =

Japanese bakery in the U.S. state of Oregon

- Interactive map of Oyatsupan Bakers

Restaurant information
- Established: May 2016
- Owner: Hiro Horie
- Chef: Hiro Horie
- Location: Beaverton, Oregon (2016–present); Tigard, Oregon (2019–present); Southeast Portland, Oregon (2026–present)
- Coordinates: 45.517°N 122.842°W
- Website: oyatsupan.com

Oyatsupan Bakers, or simply Oyatsupan, is a Japanese bakery in The Portland metropolitan area, in the U.S. state of Oregon. The original bakery opened in Beaverton in 2016, and a second location opened in Tigard in 2019. In 2026, the business began operating a kitchen in southeast Portland.

== Description ==
Oyatsupan began as an "austere" Japanese bakery in Beaverton, according to Portland Monthly, and has expanded to include other locations in The Portland metropolitan area, including Tigard and southeast Portland.

The menu has included "whimsical "chocolate pudding stuffed cornets, croissant dough apple pies with matcha custard, and doughnuts filled with Japanese beef curry, as well as eclairs, Japanese breads, pastries, and sandwiches. In 2018, Grant Butler of The Oregonian wrote, "This airy, elegant bakery combines Japanese and Western baking traditions, resulting in pastry cases filled with baked goods you expect (croissants, baguettes, puff pastry) with things you don't see at other places (green tea cookies, Japanese sweet buns, buttery rolls filled with edamame or red bean paste). There are savory options, too, like the unusual hot dog roll, which features a wiener baked into a brioche bun, and dressed up with drizzles of ketchup, mayonnaise and mustard."

== History ==
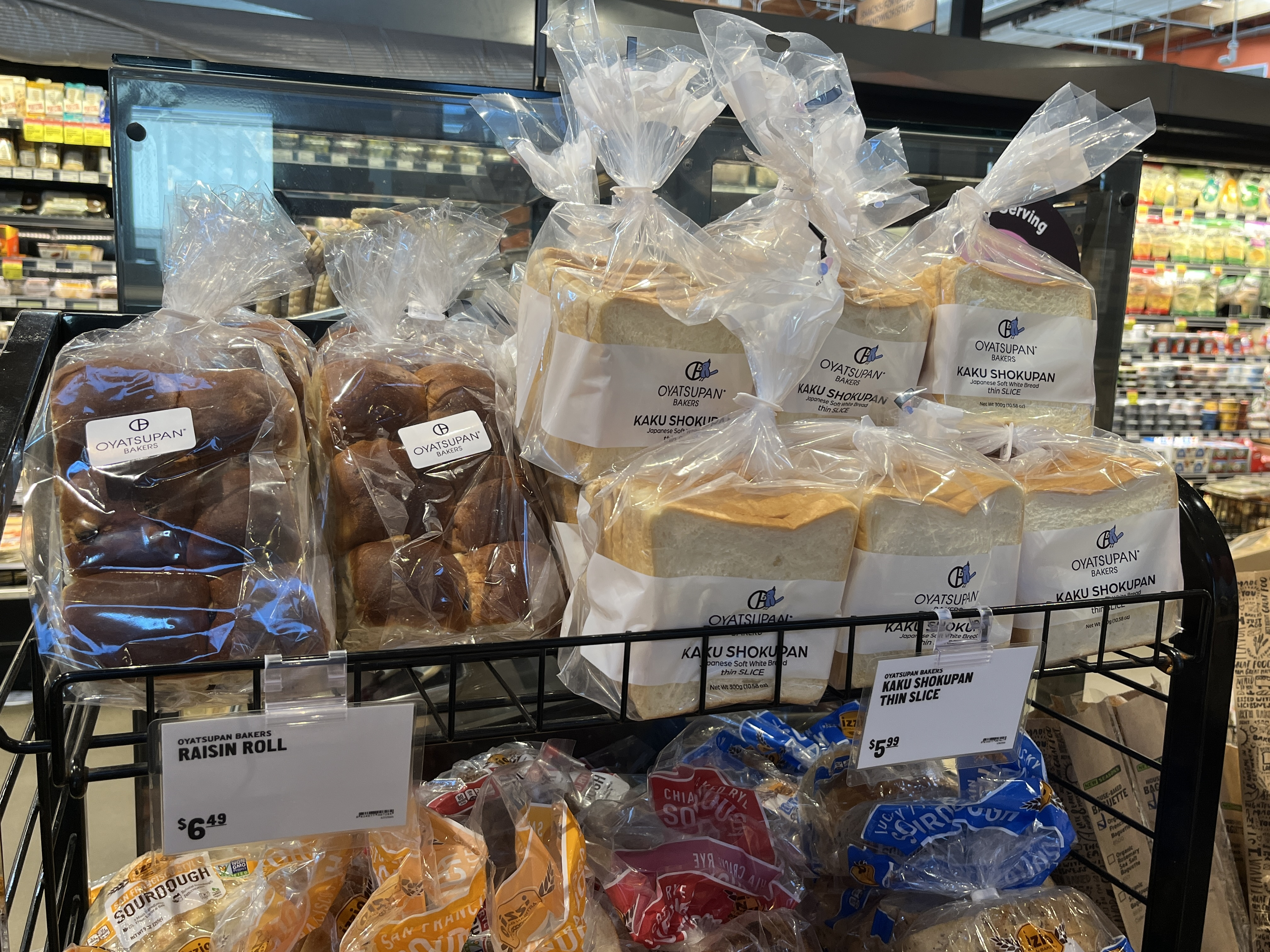
Oyatsupan Bakers products at a New Seasons Market store in Portland, Oregon, 2025

The bakery opened in May 2016. Hiro Horie is the chef and owner. In 2019, a second location called Oyatsupan Bridgeport Village opened in Tigard. The business began operating a kitchen in southeast Portland in 2026.

== Reception ==
Samantha Bakall included Oyatsupan in National Geographic's list of six of Portland's best Asian bakeries. Lizzy Acker included the bakery in The Oregonian's 2018 list of 81 "awesome things to do" in the city's suburbs. In 2019, the newspaper's Michael Russell called the business "excellent" and wrote, "Oyatsupan, the very good Japanese bakery in Beaverton, has a few items in common, most notably the milk bread, a thick-sliced loaf of fluffy white bread called Whipped Cream Pan Bread at Tous Les Jours. Grab a loaf and up your PB&J game a level or two." Jordan Curtis and Brooke Jackson-Glidden included the bakery in Eater Portland's 2020 "guide to eating and drinking" in Beaverton, Hillsboro, and Tigard. In 2022, Karen Brooks and Katherine Chew Hamilton included Oyatsupan in Portland Monthly's "opinionated guide" to the city's best bakeries.

Michelle Lopez and Janey Wong included the business in Eater Portland's 2025 overview of the city's best bakeries.

== See also ==
- List of bakeries
- List of restaurants in Portland, Oregon
