= Lulu Grace Graves =

American dietitian

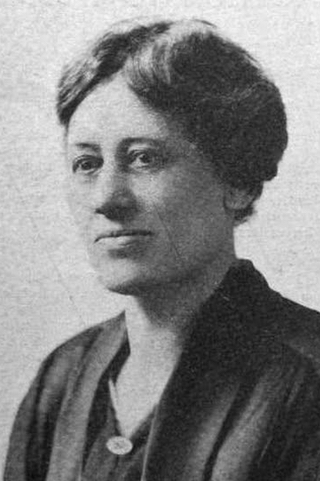
- Graves from a 1921 publication
- Born: 1874; Fairbury, Nebraska, US
- Died: July 31, 1949 (aged 74–75); Berkeley, California, US
- Education: University of Chicago
- Occupation: dietitian
- Years active: 1910–1940
- Known for: founder, first president of American Dietetic Association

Lulu Grace Graves (1874 – July 31, 1949) was an American dietitian, who was, from 1917 to 1920, the first president of the American Dietetic Association.

== Early life ==
Lulu Grace Graves was born in Fairbury, Nebraska. She trained as a teacher and taught to save money for college. She earned a degree in home economics at the University of Chicago in 1909.

== Career ==
Graves was associate professor of home economics at Iowa State College early in her career. She was professor of home economics at Cornell University, where she began a training program for hospital dietitians. Graves held various hospital positions, including first resident dietitian at Michael Reese Hospital in Chicago in 1911 (where she designed a special bland diet for typhoid fever patients), head dietitian at Lakeside Hospital in Cleveland from 1914, and superintendent of the dietary department at Mount Sinai Hospital in New York.

In 1917, she and Lenna Frances Cooper founded the American Dietetic Association, for hospital dietitians to meet and discuss the public health and food conservation needs during World War I, and she was the first president. While she was in office, and after her term ended, Graves was editor of the Dietetics and Institutional Food Service department of Modern Hospital magazine. She moved to Berkeley, California in 1938. In 1947 she received the Marjorie Hulsizer Copher Award from the American Dietetics Association.

== Death and legacy ==
Graves died from a heart attack in 1949, aged 75 years, at her home in Berkeley. The Academy of Nutrition and Dietetics gives an annual LuLu G. Graves Nutrition Education Award.

== Publications ==
Books by Graves include Modern dietetics; feeding the sick in hospital and home, with some studies on feeding well people (1917), Making food attractive for the sick (1926), Diet in the Treatment of Diabetes (1929), Foods in Health and Disease (1932), Scientific refrigeration in relation to nutrition and health (1936), and A dictionary of food and nutrition (1938, with Clarence Wilbur Taber). She also wrote articles about diet and exercise for national publications including Parents magazine.
