= Chocolate pudding =

Class of desserts with chocolate flavours

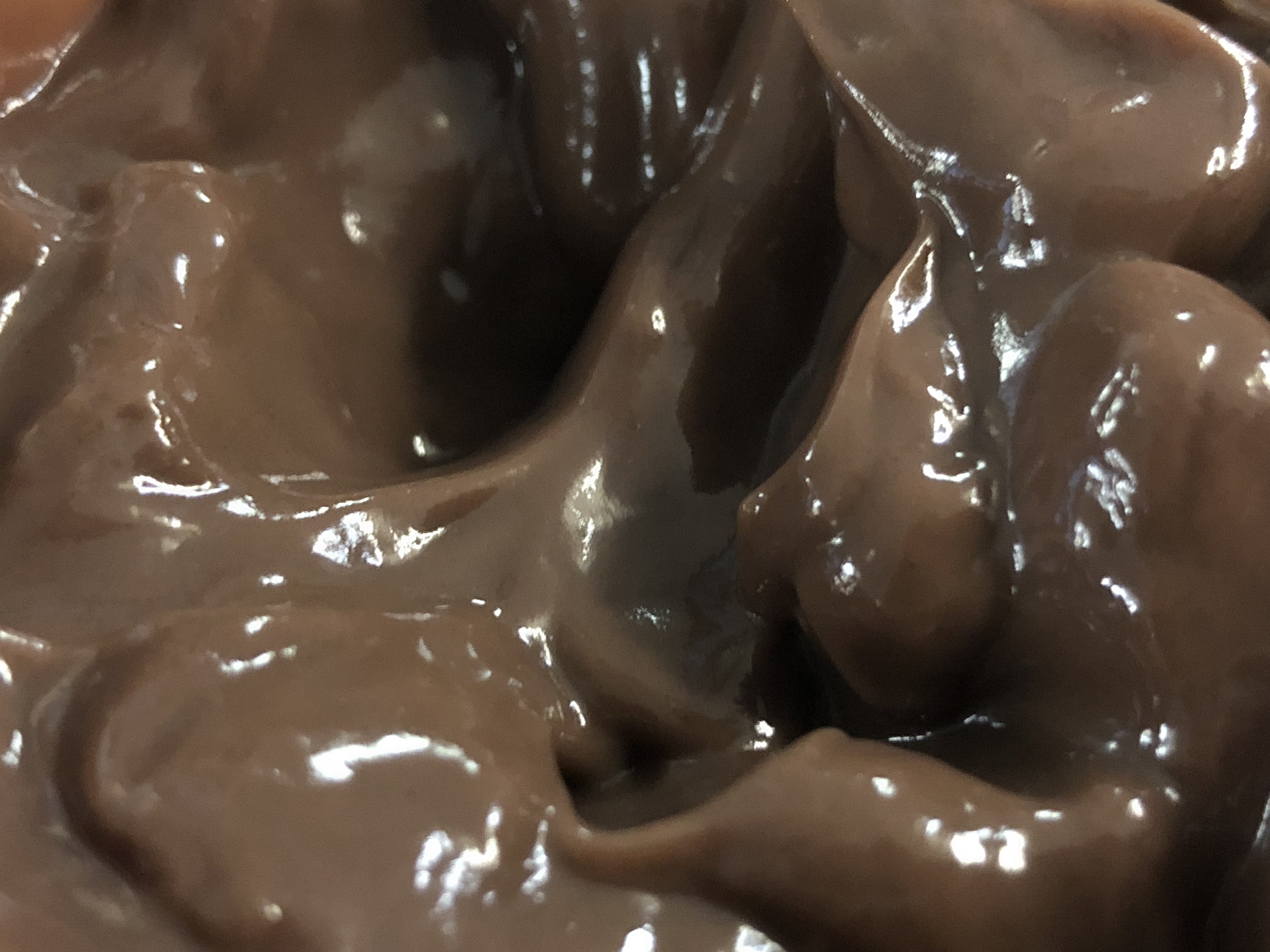
- Jell-O brand chocolate pudding

Chocolate puddings are a class of desserts in the pudding family with chocolate flavors. There are two main types: a boiled then chilled dessert, texturally a custard set with starch, commonly eaten in the U.S., Canada, Germany, Sweden, Poland, and East and South East Asia; and a steamed/baked version, texturally similar to cake, popular in the UK, Ireland, Australia, Germany and New Zealand.

== North American and Asian version ==
The U.S./Canadian and Asian version is one of the most common varieties of sweet or dessert pudding served in these countries. It is usually eaten as a snack or dessert. It is also used as a filling for chocolate (pudding) pie or black bottom pie.

Historically, it is a variation on chocolate custard, with starch used as a thickener rather than eggs. Early versions of the dish using both egg and flour can be found in the 1918 edition of Fannie Farmer's Boston Cooking School Cook Book and in the 1903 edition of Mary Harris Frazer's Kentucky Receipt Book.

In the late 19th and early 20th century, chocolate pudding was thought of as an appropriate food for invalids or children as well as a dessert. It was not considered a health food in the modern sense of the term but as a wholesome, high-calorie food for those with poor appetites. General Foods (Jell-O) introduced chocolate pudding mix in 1934 as "Walter Baker's Dessert". It was renamed "Pickle's Pudding" in 1936.

Modern chocolate puddings are usually made with milk and sugar, flavored with chocolate and vanilla and thickened with a starch such as flour or cornstarch. Occasionally, eggs are still used when making chocolate pudding. Usually, it is cooked together on the stovetop, but other methods exist, including microwaving, steaming, baking (sometimes in a bain-marie), or freezing (using gelatin as a thickener). Sometimes white chocolate pudding is made. Chocolate pudding is commonly purchased ready-made in stores; popular brands include Jell-O Pudding by the Kraft Foods Corporation and Snack Pack by Hunt's.

Many people make their chocolate puddings at home, but commercially produced tinned or refrigerated versions are commonly available in supermarkets.

== British Isles and Australian version ==
In Britain, Ireland, Australia, and New Zealand, chocolate pudding is a dessert made of flour, baking powder, sugar, whole eggs, vanilla aroma, and cocoa powder or chocolate mixed to make a batter and steamed or baked similar to Christmas pudding. Texturally, it is similar to chocolate cake, but denser, courtesy of being steamed or baked with boiling water poured over the pudding batter.

== See also ==
- Chocolate mousse
- Christmas pudding
- Black sapote
- List of steamed foods
