= Academy of Nutrition and Dietetics =

U.S. trade association

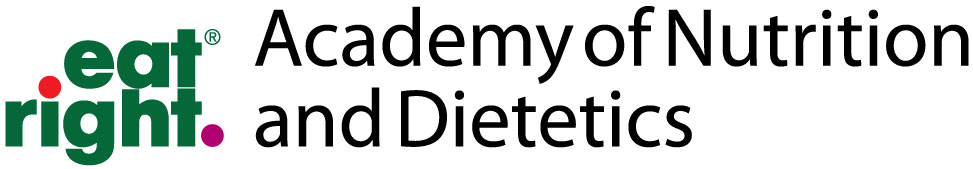
- Formation: 1917; 109 years ago
- Founders: Lulu G. Graves, Lenna F. Cooper, and others
- Founded at: Cleveland, Ohio, U.S.
- Tax ID no.: 36-0724760
- Legal status: 501(c)(6) trade association
- Purpose: To accelerate improvements in global health and well-being through food and nutrition.
- Headquarters: Chicago, Illinois, U.S.
- Coordinates: 41.879751°N 87.638713°W
- President: Deanne Brandstetter, MBA, RDN, CDN, FAND
- Chief Executive Officer: Wylecia Wiggs Harris, PhD, CAE
- Revenue: $36,686,239 (2019)
- Expenses: $38,562,550 (2019)
- Employees: 195 (2017)
- Volunteers: 540 (2017)
- Website: www.eatrightpro.org
- Formerly called: American Dietetic Association

The Academy of Nutrition and Dietetics is a multi-unit enterprise that includes a 501(c)(6) trade association in the United States. With over 60,000 members, the association claims to be the largest organization of food and nutrition professionals. Its members include registered dietitian nutritionists (RDNs), nutrition and dietetics technicians, registered (NDTRs), and other dietetics professionals.

Founded in 1917 as the American Dietetic Association, the organization officially changed its name to the Academy of Nutrition and Dietetics in 2012. According to the group's website, about 65% of its members are RDNs, and another 2% are NDTRs. The group's primary activities include providing testimony at hearings, lobbying the United States Congress and other governmental bodies, commenting on proposed regulations, and publishing statements on various topics related to food and nutrition.

The association is funded by a number of food multinationals, pharmaceutical companies, and food industry lobbying groups, such as the National Confectioners Association. The academy has faced controversy regarding corporate influence and its relationship with the food industry and funding from corporate groups such as McDonald's, Coca-Cola, Mars, and others.

== History ==
The Academy of Nutrition and Dietetics was founded in 1917 in Cleveland, Ohio, by a group of women led by Seventh-day Adventist Lenna F. Cooper, and the academy's first president, Lulu G. Graves, to help the government conserve food and improve public health during World War I. It is now headquartered in Chicago, Illinois.

The original mission of the academy was in part to help make maximal use of America's food resources during wartime. In its first year, the academy attracted 58 members. It remained a small organisation, remaining under the 1,000-member mark until the 1930s. As the group's scope expanded, so did its membership numbers. Between the 1930s and 1960s, membership grew to more than 60,000. Growth trajectory has since stabilised, and the academy marked its 70,000th member when a female dietitian in Texas re-joined the academy in May 2009. Since its founding in 1917, the academy had gained members in every decade until at least 2009, but there was a decrease to around 63,000 members in the 2020s.

Current Seal of the Academy of Nutrition and Dietetics

== Branding ==
An authorised seal for the organisation was adopted by the executive board and presented to members on October 24, 1940. At its centre are symbols of the three main characteristics of the profession: a balance scale, representing science as the foundation and symbolising equality; a caduceus, representing the close relationship between dietetics and medicine; and a cooking vessel, representing cookery and food preparation. Around the main design is a shaft of wheat, representing bread, the staff of life, and stylised acanthus leaves, representing growth and life. Over the design is a cornucopia, representing an abundant food supply. Beneath the design is the motto, "Quam Plurimis Prodesse" (means to benefit as many as possible). Around the edge is the name of the organisation and the date of its founding written in Roman numerals.

The seal is still in use on Registration Status Certificates for both registered dietitians and dietetic technicians, registered, as well as on the gold member pin.

According to current Academy president Sylvia Escott Stump, the group changed its name to the Academy of Nutrition and Dietetics in 2012 to reflect the scientific and academic expertise of its members.

== Initiatives ==
The academy has offices in Chicago and Washington, D.C. It also maintains several other organisations and entities, including the Commission on Dietetic Registration, Commission on Accreditation for Dietetics Education, Dietetic Practice Groups, Academy Political Action Committee, and Academy Foundation. There are also several Member Interest Groups that include more than 4,800 members with common interests or specialities including Fifty Plus in Nutrition and Dietetics; Filipino Americans in Dietetics and Nutrition; Muslims in Dietetics and Nutrition; and National Organisation of Blacks in Dietetics and Nutrition. Members of the academy can get involved in public policy advocacy in several areas, including Wellness and Prevention, Diversity and Inclusion, Nutrition Security and Food Safety, and Nutrition Care and Health Systems. They can get involved in advocacy efforts by completing action alerts on various policy issues that address improving communities’ nutrition and health status in the U.S. and worldwide, as well as through grassroots resources aimed at advocating health and nutrition policy from their home states and an annual advocacy summit that offers an opportunity to speak directly with legislative staff and leaders in Washington, D.C.

=== Kids Eat Right ===
The Academy of Nutrition and Dietetics and the ADA Foundation launched their first joint initiative, Kids Eat Right, in November 2012. This member-driven campaign is dedicated to supporting the efforts of the White House to end the childhood obesity epidemic within a generation. Kids Eat Right is a two-tiered campaign aimed to mobilise Academy members to participate in community and school childhood obesity prevention efforts, and also to educate families, communities, and policy makers about the importance of quality nutrition.

Kids Eat Right has a website that gives families healthy eating tips, articles, videos, and recipes from registered dietitians. Kids Eat Right also has health information based in science and centred around the theme "Shop-Cook-Eat", which has information about how to shop for healthy foods, how to cook foods with the most nutrient value, and gives the benefits of eating together at home and away from home.

=== Events ===
In 1973, the academy created "National Nutrition Week". The theme the first year was "Invest in Yourself...Buy Nutrition." On May 9, 2010, the academy proclaimed "Registered Dietitian's Day" to honour the "indispensable providers of food and nutrition services and to recognise RD for their commitment to helping people enjoy healthy lives." The association also sponsors "National Nutrition Month" in March in the U.S.

=== Academy of Nutrition and Dietetics Foundation ===
In 1966, the Academy of Nutrition and Dietetics established its Foundation as a 501(c)(3) public charity devoted exclusively to nutrition and dietetics. The Foundation is the world's largest provider of dietetic scholarships at all levels of study with other programs including awards, research grants, fellowships, public education programs and disaster relief efforts.

Funding for various programs, funds, scholarships, initiatives and grants of the Foundation are raised by Academy members, giving societies, legacy, matching and tribute donations, program fees and offerings, and gifts, sponsorship's' and grants from for-profit and non-profit organisations. The Foundation was given a four-star overall rating by CharityNavigator.org in 2018 based on data from fiscal year 2017.

== Finances ==
For fiscal year 2019, the Academy of Nutrition and Dietetics and its related organisations reported net assets of $48.36 million. For the same year, it earned revenues of $36,686,239, including $11.03 million of revenue from membership dues, $8.64 million from registration and examination fees, $5.52 million of revenue from programs and meetings, $5.29 million from publications and subscriptions, $2.29 million from education programs, and $1.1 million from its corporate sponsors. The organisation incurred $38,562,550 of expenses during the same period.

During fiscal year 2015, the organisation received $1.1 million in corporate sponsorship's from companies like General Mills, Coca-Cola and Pepsi Co via donations, joint initiatives, and programs.

== Positions and publications ==
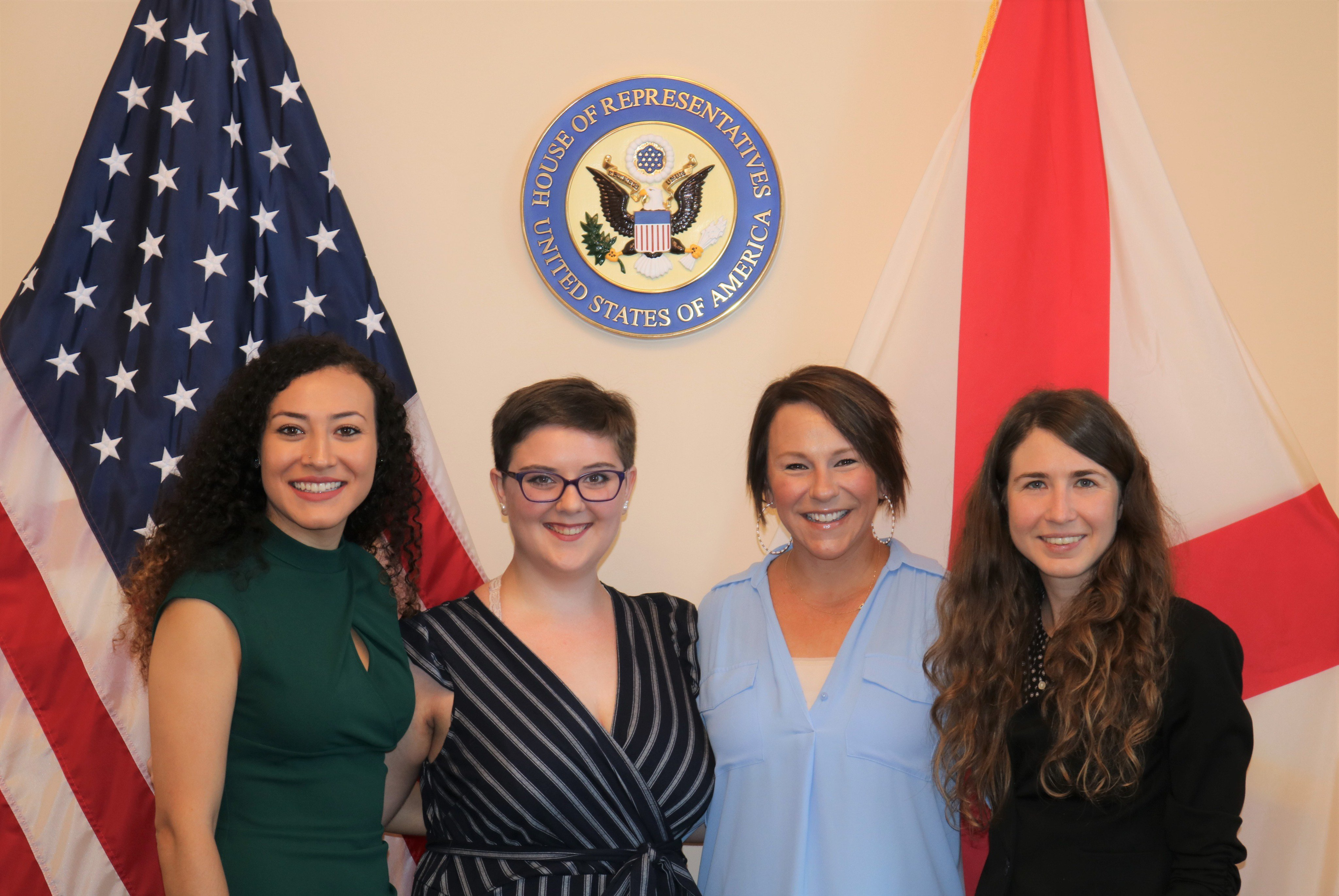
US Representative Martha Roby with representatives from the Academy of Nutrition and Dietetics in Washington, D.C., in 2019

The academy aims to influence public opinion and legislative discussion about health, food safety and nutrition through its numerous publications. Volunteers of the AND have been quoted in publications such as The New York Times, The Wall Street Journal, USA Today, Los Angeles Times, Men's Fitness, O Magazine, Consumer Reports, Forbes and Huffington Post. In 2010, the organisation stated it received approximately 30 billion media impressions annually.

The AND holds a variety of positions on public health and diet, including:

- The academy "maintains that the only way to lose weight is through a healthy, well-balanced diet and exercise."
- The academy's stated position is that "there are no good or bad foods, only good and bad diets." According to the academy such labelling or "bumpers" confuse the public.
- The academy states that "exclusive breastfeeding provides optimal nutrition and health protection for the first 6 months of life and breastfeeding with complementary foods from 6 months until at least 12 months of age is the ideal feeding pattern for infants."
- The academy "believes that up to two servings of soy per day for adults could be part of a healthy diet."
- The academy states that to combat the obesity epidemic, adults and children need access to healthy foods, education on eating well, and preventative health services, including counselling by registered dietitian nutritionists. They support the White House and Michelle Obama's efforts to end the childhood obesity epidemic within a generation.
- The academy opposed mandated labelling of "trans fats" on food packaging.
- The academy has given low ratings to the high-protein, low-carb diet known as the Atkins Diet, insisting that the diet is "unhealthy and the weight loss is temporary." The academy maintains that carbohydrates are not responsible for weight gain any more than other forms of calories.
- The academy states that children who eat breakfast have better concentration, problem-solving skills, and eye–hand coordination, and that children who do not eat breakfast are tired at school and eat more junk food.

=== Research and publications ===
The Academy of Nutrition and Dietetics publishes position papers on public health regarding pediatric (children's) health, food technology, food safety, geriatrics (elderly) health, health-care reform, obesity and food and nutrition topics through the Journal of the Academy of Nutrition and Dietetics (ANDJ).

The academy has also published three editions of the American Dietetic Association Complete Food and Nutrition Guide. Through its publishing arm, the academy has published such books and guides as Easy Gluten-Free, ADA Pocket Guide to Eating Disorders, ADA Pocket Guide to Lipid Disorders, Hypertension, Diabetes and Weight Management, ADA Quick Guide to Drug-Supplement Interactions and Making Nutrition Your Business. It also maintains the site eatright.org.

In the 1980s, the academy published the magazine Food/2 which had originally been created by the U.S. Department of Agriculture. In response pressure from meat, egg, and dairy industries, the Department of Agriculture decided not publish it, after which the academy negotiated with the government to publish it itself, omitting the controversial chapters on fat and cholesterol. The decision was widely criticised, with participating dietitians stating "it is just incredible that they would publish it without the most important part."

The association also produces the Journal of the Academy of Nutrition and Dietetics (JAND), formerly titled the Journal of the American Dietetic Association (JADA), a monthly peer-reviewed publication published by Elsevier involved in the dietetics field.

== Certifications ==
The Academy of Nutrition and Dietetics offers two types of dietitian certifications: Registered Dietitian Nutritionist (RDN) and Nutrition and Dietetics Technician, Registered (NDTR). Both are educated nutrition professionals qualified to work in hospitals, academia and private practice, and differ mostly in the hours of training and level of college degree required. A Registered Dietitian Nutritionist must complete a graduate degree or higher and more than 1000 hours of training, while a Dietetic Technician is required to complete an associate level degree and at least 450 hours of training. About 65% of the academy's members are Registered Dietitian Nutritionists, and 2% are Nutrition Dietetic Technicians, Registered. Members are granted these accredited titles by fulfilling the academy's certification requirements, in addition to any state or local regulations. Through its ADAF foundation, the academy issued nearly $515,000 in certification scholarships in 2011, $100,000 of which went to doctoral students.

The terms "Registered Dietitian Nutritionist" and "Nutrition Dietetic Technician, Registered" are "legally protected titles" and can be used only by someone who has completed coursework approved by the academy. In recent years, the AND has lobbied for stricter regulation over the professional licensing of dietitian and nutrition professionals and supported state regulations that would include heavy fines for the dispensing of nutritional advice without the proper license.

The Academy of Nutrition and Dietetics' Accreditation Council for Education in Nutrition and Dietetics (ACEND) is the organization's accrediting agency for education programs that prepare individuals for careers as dietetics professionals. Prior to 2011, ACEND was known as the Commission on Accreditation for Dietetics Education (CADE). The Accreditation Council is recognised by the Department of Education and is a member of the Association of Specialised and Professional Accredits. The council's fees earn the academy over $1 million per year.

=== Registered Dietitian Nutritionist (RDN) ===
The Academy of Nutrition and Dietetics offers certifications for Registered Dietitian Nutritionists (RDNs), although certain states have additional requirements for dietitians. According to the AND's website, an RDN is a "food and nutrition expert" who has fulfilled the following minimum requirements:

- Completed a minimum of a bachelor's degree at a U.S. regionally accredited university or college, and course work accredited or approved by the Accreditation Council for Education in Nutrition and Dietetics (ACEND) of the Academy of Nutrition and Dietetics
- Beginning January 1, 2024, a graduate degree will be required in order to take the registration examination for RDNs
- Completed an ACEND-accredited supervised practice program at a health-care facility, community agency, or a food service corporation or combined with undergraduate or graduate studies
- Passed a national examination administered by the Commission on Dietetic Registration of the Academy of Nutrition and Dietetics
- Completed continuing professional educational requirements to maintain registration

In addition to the costs of the college coursework, the academy charges a $234 application fee for registered dietitians, and students must complete a 1,200 hour internship to sit for the Registered Dietitian exam.

Approximately 50% of RDs hold advanced degrees. The AND also offers additional certifications in specialized areas of practice, although these are not required for RDN certification.

=== Nutrition Dietetic Technician, Registered (NDTR) ===
The AND also offers certifications for Nutrition Dietetic Technicians, Registered (NDTRs). According to the AND's website, NDTRs are "educated and trained at the technical level of nutrition and dietetics practice", and must fulfill at least one the following minimum requirements:

- Successful completion of a Dietetic Technician Program accredited by the Accreditation Council for Education in Nutrition and Dietetics (ACEND) of the Academy of Nutrition and Dietetics, and at least an Associate degree at a U.S. regionally accredited college or university
- Completion of a bachelor's degree granted by a U.S. regionally accredited college or university, or foreign equivalent, and completion of an ACEND Didactic Program in Dietetics, and completion of an ACEND-accredited Dietetic Technician supervised practice program
- Successful completion of coursework in an ACEND-accredited Didactic Program in Dietetics and completion of at least a bachelor's degree at a U.S. regionally accredited college or university

NDTRs typically work alongside RDNs in settings such as hospitals, health care facilities, private practice, day care centres, correctional facilities, and weight loss centres. The academy application fee to become an NDTR is $120.

== Awards ==
The academy gives several awards, of which the highest is the Marjorie Hulsizer Copher Award, named for American dietitian Marjorie Hulsizer Copher (1892–1935) and given annually since 1945 to a member who "has contributed to the profession through extensive, active participation and service to the profession of nutrition and dietetics, both within and outside of the Academy". As of 2020, the award, which is the "highest honour the Academy of Nutrition and Dietetics bestows on one of its members," has still never been given to a Black nutrition professional. Other awards include the Lenna Frances Cooper Memorial Lecture Award, named for American dietitian Lenna Frances Cooper and given to "a notable and inspiring speaker" who presents the memorial lecture. In 2019, the academy introduced the Excellence in Diversity and Inclusion Promotion Award in an effort to "recognizes a member who has demonstrated excellence in innovation, creativity, and leadership in the promotion of diversity and inclusion." In 2020, the Excellence in Diversity and Inclusion Promotion Award was given to Dr. Bruce D. Rengers, a white professor of nutrition at Metropolitan State University (MSU). During the academy's FNCE 2020 conference, 22 esteemed nutrition professionals received honours. Of the 22 awardees, two were RDNs of colour and zero recipients were Black.

== Lobbying efforts and competitive protections ==
To aid in lobbying the U.S. government, the Academy of Nutrition and Dietetics has offices in Washington, D.C. They also operate their own political action committee, the academy's Political Action Committee. The academy spent $5.8 million lobbying at the state and national level from 2000 to 2010.

A 1985 report noted the academy has supported licensing for dispensing nutritional advice. In addition to supporting legislation regulating the professional nutrition field in states like Colorado, Wyoming, Hawaii, New Jersey and New York, the academy has also applied for patents for its certification titles such as: "Certified Nutrition Coach", "Certified Nutrition Professional", "Registered Nutrition Professional", and "Certified Nutrition Educator". The academy states that by regulating who can provide nutritional counselling, they can protect their registered members and the public from unregulated advice or possibly inaccurate advice from less qualified dietary practitioners such as chiropractors, yoga instructors, homeopaths, and personal trainers. The academy's support of this legislation has generated strong opposition from alternative health practitioners and libertarian groups, who state that "highly restrictive bills could create a monopoly for one school of traditional nutrition thought" and that the primary intent of the bill is "not to protect the public, but to give clout and recognition to a single segment of dietitians, increasing their chances of obtaining reimbursement from insurance companies."

== Controversies ==
The Academy of Nutrition and Dietetics has been criticised for its connections to the pharmaceutical industry, including an inquiry from Senator Chuck Grassley.

In 1982, the organisation faced mass resignations from members over a decision to support President Ronald Reagan's cuts in food stamps and school lunch programs. The decision was largely a political trade-off; the Reagan administration agreed to drop its proposal to deregulate nursing homes in exchange for the academy's support of the school lunch and food stamp cuts.

The academy was selected for Department of Defence funding to work with the Council of State Governments' National Centre for Interstate Compacts on an interstate license compact for the nutrition and dietetics profession.

The academy works with policy leaders at every level of government to promote health and reduce the burden of chronic disease through nutrition services and interventions. Its public policy priorities for 2024-2026 include:

- Equitable access to nutrition services provided by qualified practitioners
- Federal programs that increase access to nutritious, safe, culturally relevant and affordable foods that improve health and well-being
- Evidence-informed, inclusive Dietary Guidelines for Americans that embrace cultural and diverse dietary patterns
- Maximise funding for federal nutrition programs and services, workforce diversity initiatives and educational opportunities for health profession

=== Criticism of partnerships with food companies ===
A 1995 report, noted the academy received funding from companies like McDonald's, PepsiCo, The Coca-Cola Company, Sara Lee, Abbott Nutrition, General Mills, Kellogg's, Mars, McNeil Nutritionals, SOYJOY, Truvia, Unilever, and The Sugar Association as corporate sponsorship. The academy also partners with ConAgra Foods, which produces Orville Redenbacker, Slim Jims, Hunt's Ketchup, SnackPacks, and Hebrew National hot dogs, to maintain the American Dietetic Association/ConAgra Foods Home Food Safety...It's in Your Hands program. Additionally, the academy earns revenue from corporations by selling space at its booth during conventions, doing this for soft drinks and candy makers.

In April 2013, a dietitian working on a panel charged with setting policy on genetically modified foods for the academy contended she was removed for pointing out that two of its members had ties to Monsanto, one of the biggest makers of genetically modified seeds. The resulting controversy highlighted the fact that Ms. Smith Edge, chairwoman of the committee charged with developing the GMO policy, is a senior vice president at the International Food Information Council, which is largely financed by food, beverage and agriculture businesses, including companies like DuPont, Bayer CropScience and Cargill, companies that were among the biggest financial opponents of a State of California GMO labeling initiative.

The academy maintains that being at the "same table" with food companies is important in order to exert a positive influence over their products and message, although critics describe this as an "unhealthy alliance" between the academy and junk food companies. The accusation is that despite what good may come of such programs, it ultimately whitewashes (similar to the greenwashing efforts of environmentally irresponsible companies) the brand's role in the country's food ecosystem. Watchdogs note that the academy rarely criticises food companies, believing it to be out of fear of "biting the hand that feeds them." Nutrition expert Marion Nestle opined that she believed that as long as the AND partners with the makers of food and beverage products, "its opinions about diet and health will never be believed [to be] independent." Public health lawyer Michele Simon, who researches and writes about the food industry and food politics, has voiced similar concerns stating, "AND [is] deeply embedded with the food industry, and often communicate[s] messaging that is industry friendly." A 2011 survey, found that 80% of academy members are critical of the academy's position. They believe that the academy is endorsing corporate sponsors and their products when it allows their sponsorship.

In March 2015, academy had endorsed Kraft Singles cheese product with the 'Kids Eat Right' label. Due to negative publicity, they entered into negotiations with Kraft to cancel this endorsement.

The organisation also publishes nutrition facts sheets for the general public, which food companies pay $20,000 to take part in writing the documents. A list of these publications for the general public include:

- What's a Mom to Do: Healthy Eating Tips for Families sponsored by Wendy's.
- Lamb: The Essence of Nutrient Rich Flavor sponsored by the Tri-Lamb Group.
- Cocoa and Chocolate: Sweet News! sponsored by the Hershey Center for Health and Nutrition.
- Eggs: A Good Choice for Moms-to-Be sponsored by the American Egg Board.
- Adult Beverage Consumption: Making Responsible Drinking Choices sponsored by the Distilled Spirits Council.

This industry funding also gives food companies the ability to offer official educational seminars to teach dietitians how to advise their clients in a way that advances the interests of the food company. For instance, in a Coca-Cola sponsored seminar for dietitians, the speaker promoted free sugars consumption for children as a healthy choice.

=== Criticism of racism and lack of diversity ===
The Academy of Nutrition and Dietetics has been criticized for its lack of racial/ethnic diversity and lack of response to address the concerns of academy members of colour. According to the Commission on Dietetic Registration's demographic data as of October 2020, 78% of RDNs identified as White, while 2.6% identified as Black or African American, 3.3% as Hispanic or Latinx, 3.9% as Asian, 1.1% as Native Hawaiian Pacific Islander, 0.3% as American Indian or Alaskan Native, and 0.6% as Two or more races. These demographics reflect an underrepresentation of all minority racial/ethnic groups and an overrepresentation of white dietitians in the profession when compared to the racial/ethnic demographics obtained from the US Census. Black, Asian, Hispanic or Latino, Native American, Pacific Islanders, and mixed race people make up 40% of the United States population, yet these communities make up only 11.8% of registered dietitians in the US.

The academy has been made aware of this issue for many years. In 1984, the academy (then called the ADA) commissioned a study on the health care of minorities and released the findings in its report, A New Look at the Profession of Dietetics. In 1987, the academy developed its first Minority Recruitment and Retention Plan and in 1992 appointed a House of Delegates Affirmative Action Committee, later renamed the Diversity Committee. In 1996 the Diversity Committee drafted a diversity philosophy statement and included 'diversity' as a component in its 1996-1999 Strategic Framework plan. Despite the academy's awareness of the problem and statements of support, little progress has been made in diversifying the profession in the past 35 years, as evidenced by the continued under representation of all racial/ethnic minority groups in demographic data.
