= Mary deGarmo Bryan =

American dietician and professor

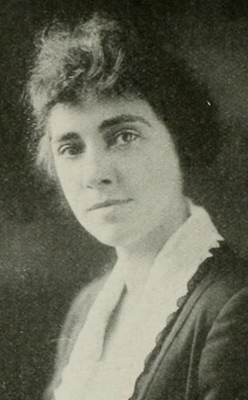
- Mary deGarmo Bryan, from a 1922 publication.
- Born: August 1891; Warrensburg, Missouri
- Died: May 12, 1986 (aged 94); Chicago
- Occupations: Dietitian, college professor

Mary deGarmo Bryan (August 1891 – May 12, 1986) was an American dietician and professor at Columbia University and served as the second president of the American Dietetic Association (ADA). She helped pioneer the federal school National Lunch Program in the United States and also served as an editor and nutrition adviser.

== Early life ==
Mary Cora deGarmo was born in Warrensburg, Missouri, the daughter of Frank deGarmo and Mary O'Donnell deGarmo. Bryan had one sister, Margaret deGarmo Payne, and the two were educated by their mother throughout their adolescence. Bryan's mother was a teacher and also worked with the St. Louis Women's Chamber of Commerce to formulate Plans for Organization and Work for Americanization as well as a Constitution for a Central Cooperative Americanization League in 1919. Bryan's mother was incredibly active in the revitalization of the American school system, specifically with the aim of ensuring the uniformity of public school education and the Americanization of the curriculum. She helped disperse training information and taught teachers to Americanize their foreign-born students, and she also advocated for the creation of Americanization centers "where American women will teach them [immigrant women] Cooking, Dressmaking, Millinery, Home Economics, etc." Mary deGarmo was also an advocate for eugenics and encouraged federal studies to assess how race and nutrition could be harnessed for social manipulations. The racial and purity biases of Bryan's mother may have influenced Bryan's own approach to some facets of nutrition later in life; however, these themes of race and health were not unique to Bryan and were common in the fields of health and nutrition at the time.

== Career ==
Bryan graduated from Newcomb College in 1912, and from Washington University in St. Louis in 1913. She taught at Agnes Scott College from 1913 to 1915 and at the University of Illinois Urbana-Champaign from 1915 to 1916. As World War I continued, Bryan was hired at $720 per annum to be a civilian employee in the U.S. Army Medical Department and operated out of Fort McPherson, Georgia. She was quickly appointed to the orthopedic institution Base Hospital 1114, and she served as an army dietitian overseas in France. After Bryan was honorably discharged, effective April 30, 1919, she returned to the US and gave a passionate speech to the ADA's third annual meeting (1920) regarding her experiences with war-time nutritional practices. Her speech was so impactful that she was notified just a few hours later that she had been elected on a secret ballot to serve a 2-year term as ADA president. Her time as ADA president and subsequent efforts in advocacy were characterized by a unified pursuit of the patient's common good: "All of us working together for the good of the patient should work together, for after all, the power of an ideal, and cooperation to attain it, is the biggest lesson the war has taught us. That seems to me to be the promise in this association and its possibility as a power."

During her term as president, Bryan also oversaw the creation of a formal Social Service Committee to investigate the dietary patterns of minority racial groups and ethnicities. The specific driving factors for the decision to form this committee are uncertain, but the effect was to preserve a kind of professional and cultural elitists in the world of dietetics at the time. These various dietary studies produced publications that characterized racial groups by virtue of their perceived inadequacies, leading to claims such as "the Italian dietary [way of eating] was characterized by a large amount of wheat products, green vegetables and olive oil; the diet of the negro by pork products and milled grains such as rice and hominy, whereas the Hebrew adhered more or less strictly to the dietary laws."

After her term as president, Bryan taught at Teachers College, Columbia University from 1934 to 1951, where she chaired the department of institutional management. She earned a Ph.D. in chemistry at Columbia University in 1931, with a dissertation titled "Amylase activity of blood serum in relation to age and nutritional history". She edited The Journal of Home Economics from 1921 to 1924, helped to revise the cookbook of the United States Navy, and wrote a textbook, The School Cafeteria (1936, with Alice M. Zabriskie). Other publications by Bryan include Some aspects of management of college residence halls for women (1935, with Grace Melvina Augustine), Furnishings and equipment for residence halls (with Etta H. Handy), and Establishing and Operating a Restaurant (1946, with Alberta Macfarlane and Edward Russell Hawkins).

Bryan helped to develop and promote the federally-funded lunch program in American public schools. "You can't teach hungry children," she explained about the program in 1966. "If you are going to make effective use of the hundreds of millions of dollars we spend on schools, you should be sure the children are in good physical shape for learning." She also stated of the school lunch program, "It [the school lunch program] has become a significant factor in the national economy, a participant in the health and welfare programs of the nation and the community. It competes for priority in the distribution of funds in these areas as well as in education." Bryan has been credited with initiating a $50 million federal program that, at its inception, provided school lunches in approximately 25,000 communities.

Bryan fought to promote proper nutrition for children alongside other pioneering figures such as Mary Swartz Rose, a dietician who also advocated for child nutrition and food-related safety practices and about whom Bryan wrote many papers. Bryan also fought in the political arena for the advancement of nutrition, including strongly opposing H.R. 4717 in 1946 because the bill included a provision that prevented military dietitians from any actions beyond therapeutic measures. Her convictions regarding the importance of nutrition as a preventive measure helped lead to the eventual removal of the strict therapeutic clause from the bill, expanding the reach of dieticians in the military and drawing attention to the many underappreciated facets of nutrition in general health and well-being.

== Personal life ==
Mary deGarmo married Charles W. Bryan Jr., a civil engineer and manufacturing executive of the Pullman Standard Car Manufacturing Co. While living in Chicago, Bryan worked with many charitable and social organizations, including the Mary Bartelme Homes for dependent girls and the Chicago Historical Society, and she also served as a trustee for the local Fourth Fourth Presbyterian. Her papers are archived in the Eskind Biomedical Library at Vanderbilt University. She was a widow when she died at the age of 94 in Chicago, and she was buried in New Rochelle, N.Y.
