= KWBE =

Radio station in Beatrice, Nebraska, United States

- Beatrice, Nebraska; United States
- Frequency: 1450 kHz

Programming
- Format: Classic hits
- Affiliations: ABC News Radio; Westwood One

Ownership
- Owner: Mike Flood; (Flood Communications of Beatrice, LLC)
- Sister stations: KGMT, KUTT

History
- Call sign meaning: Beatrice

Technical information
- Licensing authority: FCC
- Facility ID: 12950
- Class: C
- Power: 530 watts unlimited
- Transmitter coordinates: 40°15′49.00″N 96°46′27.00″W
- Translator: 94.7 K234CW (Beatrice)

Links
- Public license information: Public file; LMS
- Webcast: Listen live
- Website: kwbe.com

KWBE (1450 AM, "Beatrice Radio 1450") is a radio station broadcasting a classic hits format. Licensed to Beatrice, Nebraska, United States, the station is currently owned by Mike Flood through Flood Communications of Beatrice, LLC, and features programming from Westwood One.
