= Abby Lillian Marlatt =

American educator (1869–1943)

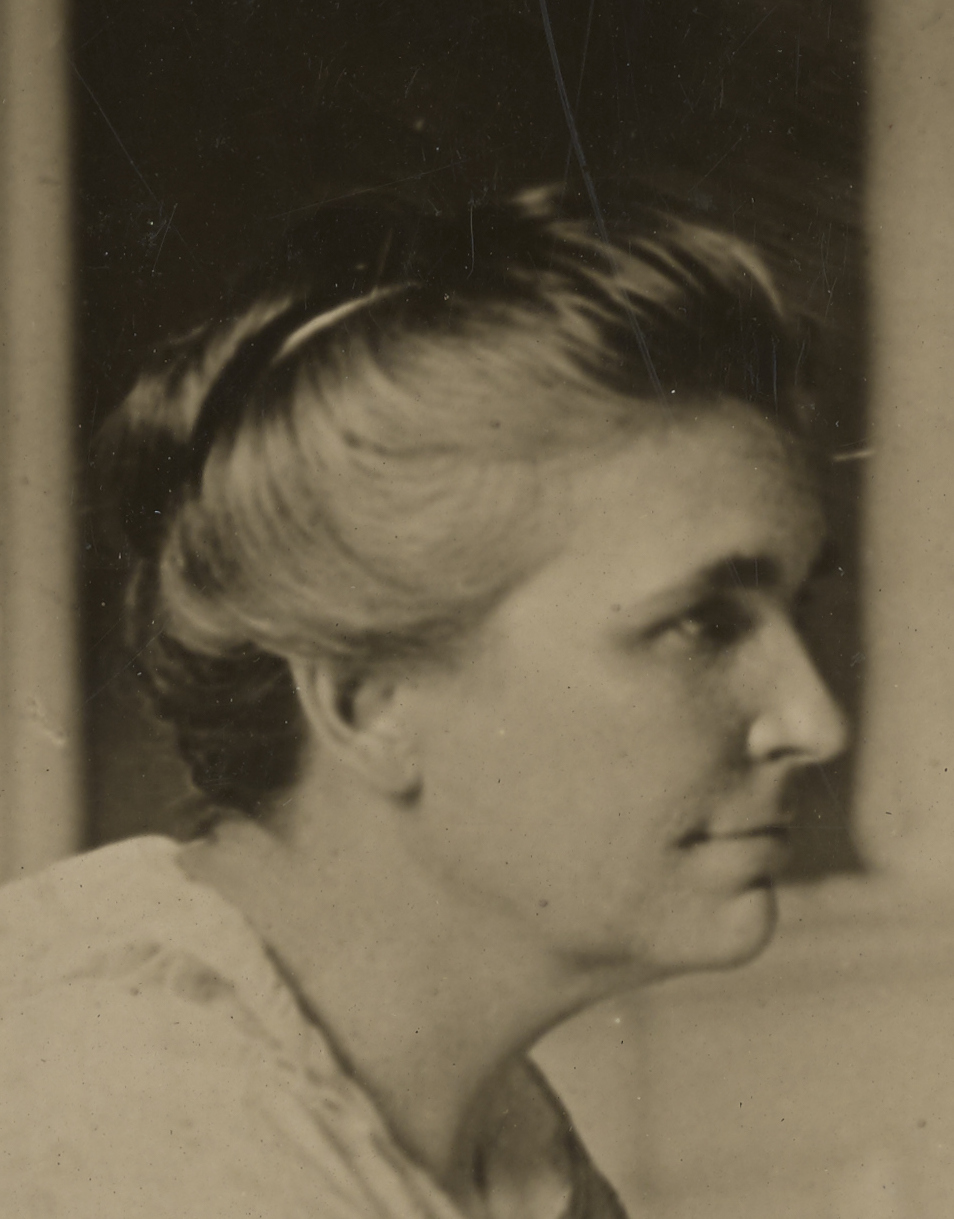
- Born: March 7, 1869; Manhattan, Kansas, U.S.
- Died: June 23, 1943 (aged 74); Madison, Wisconsin

Academic background
- Education: Kansas State College

Academic work
- Discipline: Home economics
- Institutions: University of Wisconsin

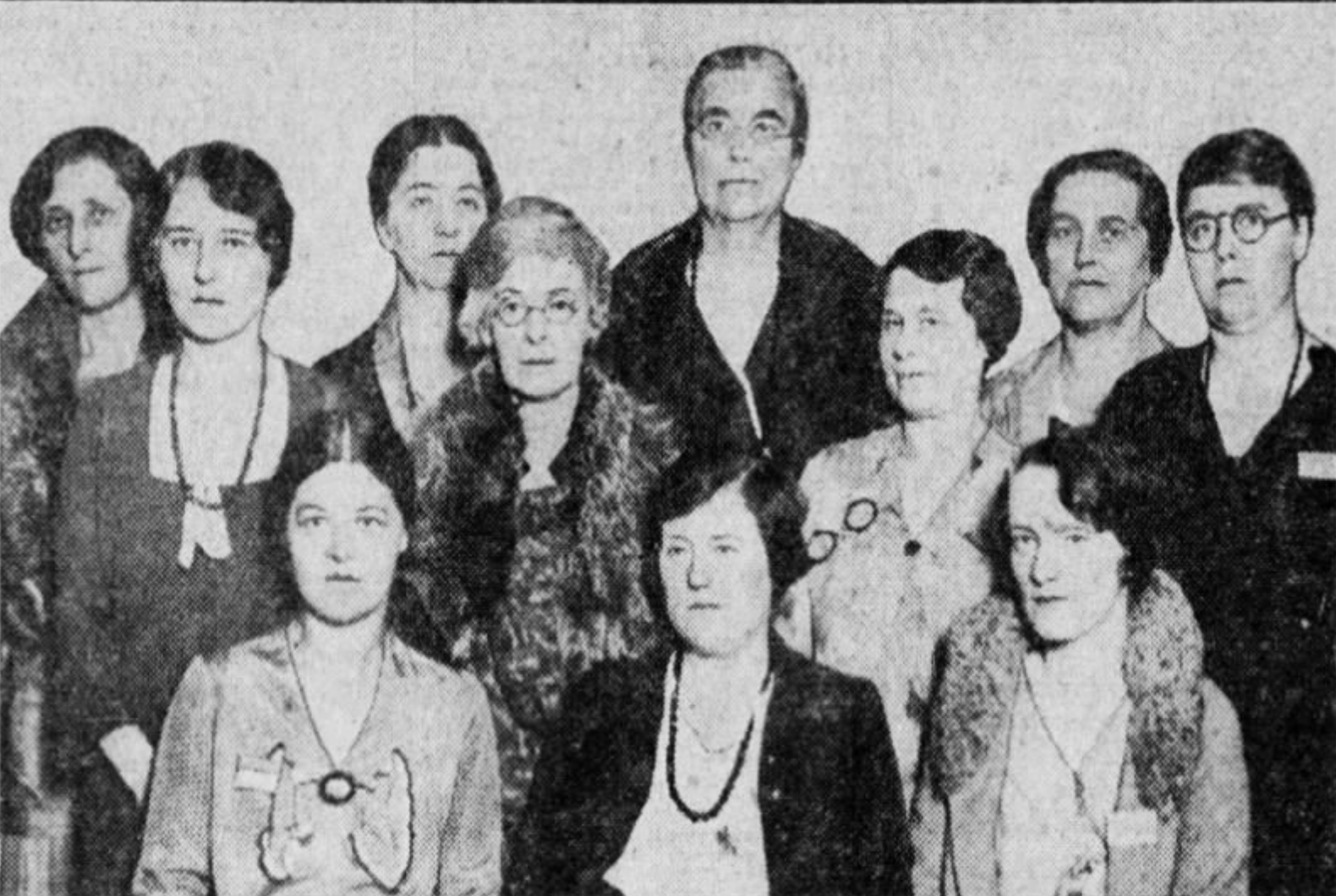
Dietitians at a 1929 meeting; front row: Quindara Oliver Dodge, Anne E. Boller, Katherine M. Thoma. Middle row: Ruth Cooley, Mary S. Rose, Lenna F. Cooper, Helen Anderson. Back row: Emma Feeney, Clyde Schuman, Abby Lillian Marlatt, Martha Koehne

Abby Lillian Marlatt (March 7, 1869 – June 23, 1943) was an American educator.

Born in Manhattan, Kansas, Marlatt graduated from Kansas State College with a B.S. in 1888. receiving her M.S. from the same institution in 1890. After graduation, she taught home economics, beginning in Utah before going to Rhode Island. In 1909, she came to the University of Wisconsin, where she became the first director of the home economics department. She remained in this capacity until retiring, in 1939, with the title of professor emeritus. She established a regular curriculum and provided students with more specialized work; besides emphasizing teaching and extension work, she advocated broad training with grounding in the arts and sciences. During World War I she helped the state of Wisconsin to plan how to join in the national efforts towards conserving food. She remained in Madison after her retirement, dying there in 1943.

== See also ==
- Abby Lindsey Marlatt, Ph.D., her niece
