= KGMT =

- Fairbury, Nebraska; United States
- Frequency: 1310 kHz
- Branding: Good Time Oldies

Programming
- Format: Oldies
- Affiliations: ABC Radio

Ownership
- Owner: Mike Flood; (Flood Communications of Beatrice, LLC)
- Sister stations: KWBE, KUTT

Technical information
- Licensing authority: FCC
- Facility ID: 60292
- Class: D
- Power: 500 watts day 95 watts night
- Transmitter coordinates: 40°6′58″N 97°9′5″W

Links
- Public license information: Public file; LMS

KGMT (1310 AM) is a radio station broadcasting an Oldies format. It is licensed to Fairbury, Nebraska, United States. The station is currently owned by Flood Communications of Beatrice, LLC.

The station derives a portion of its programming from Scott Shannon's The True Oldies Channel from ABC Radio.
