= KUTT =

- Fairbury, Nebraska; United States
- Broadcast area: Beatrice, Nebraska; Lincoln, Nebraska
- Frequency: 99.5 MHz
- Branding: Ol' Red 99.5

Programming
- Format: Country
- Affiliations: Fox News Radio

Ownership
- Owner: Mike Flood; (Flood Communications of Beatrice, LLC)
- Sister stations: KWBE, KGMT

Technical information
- Licensing authority: FCC
- Facility ID: 60291
- Class: C1
- ERP: 100,000 watts
- HAAT: 211.0 meters (692.3 ft)
- Transmitter coordinates: 40°10′57.00802″N 96°58′34.10704″W

Links
- Public license information: Public file; LMS
- Webcast: Listen Live
- Website: Ol' Red 99.5 Online

KUTT (99.5 FM) is a radio station broadcasting a Country music format. Licensed to Fairbury, Nebraska, United States, the station serves the Lincoln area. The station is currently owned by Flood Communications of Beatrice, LLC.
