= Fairbury Public Schools =

School district in Fairbury, Nebraska

Location
- Fairbury, Jefferson County, Nebraska, 68352; United States

District information
- Type: Public
- Motto: Foundations for Learning; Prepared Productive Citizens; Safe Supportive Environments

Other information
- Website: fairburyjeffs.org

Fairbury Public Schools is a school district headquartered in Fairbury, Nebraska.

To combat vaping among students in 2019 the district began doing tests of secondary (junior and senior high school) students engaged in extracurricular activities.

== Schools ==
- Fairbury Junior-Senior High School
- Jefferson Intermediate School
- Central Elementary School
