= Forrest McPherson =

American football player (1911–1989)

- McPherson with son, 1945

No. 25, 26, 35, 72
- Position: Offensive lineman

Personal information
- Born: October 22, 1911; Fairbury, Nebraska, U.S.
- Died: October 7, 1989 (aged 77); Centralia, Washington, U.S.
- Listed height: 5 ft 11 in (1.80 m)
- Listed weight: 233 lb (106 kg)

Career information
- High school: Fairbury (NE)
- College: Nebraska

Career history
- Chicago Bears (1935); Philadelphia Eagles (1935–1937); Green Bay Packers (1943–1945)

Awards and highlights
- NFL champion (1944)

Career statistics
- Games played: 37
- Starts: 15
- Stats at Pro Football Reference

Forrest Winfield McPherson (October 22, 1911 – October 7, 1989) was an American football player who played in the National Football League (NFL) for the Chicago Bears, Philadelphia Eagles and Green Bay Packers. He attended the University of Nebraska. Forrest won a Championship with the Packers in 1944.
