= Lenna F. Cooper =

American dietitian (1875–1961)

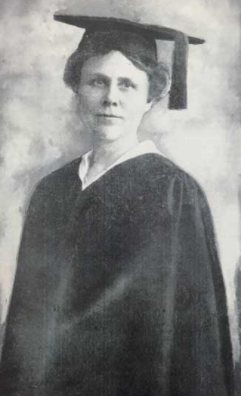
- Born: 25 February 1875; Hutchinson, Kansas, U.S.
- Died: 23 February 1961 (aged 85)
- Occupations: Dietitian, writer

Lenna Frances Cooper (25 February 1875 – 23 February 1961) was an American dietitian and co-founder of the Academy of Nutrition and Dietetics. She has been called "a pioneer in vegetarian nutrition and dietetics."

== Career ==
Cooper co-founded what was then called the American Dietetic Association in 1917, becoming its first vice president and the 14th President (1937). She was also the first president of first president of the Michigan Dietetic Association. From 1918 until 1919, Cooper was the first Supervising Dietitian for the U.S. Army. Besides working for the Surgeon General of the United States, Cooper created the Department of Dietetics at the National Institutes of Health.

While a nursing student at the Battle Creek Sanitarium (she graduated in 1901), Cooper became a protege of John Harvey Kellogg. She was appointed Chief Dietitian of the Battle Creek Sanitarium. She was the first director at the Battle Creek School of Home Economics from 1908. More than 500 dieticians graduated at Battle Creek under her tenure.

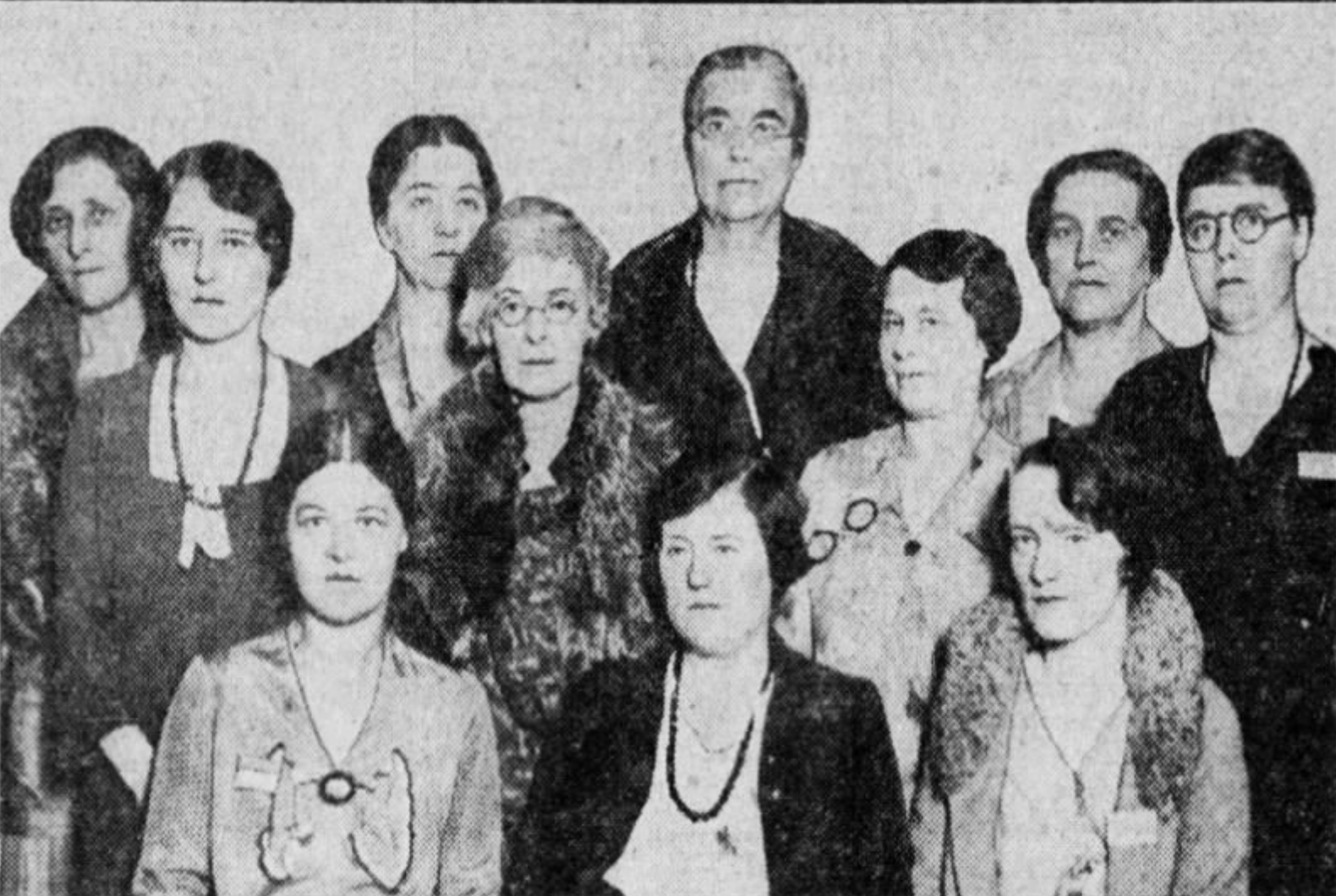
Dietitians at a 1929 meeting; front row: Quindara Oliver Dodge, Anne E. Boller, Katherine M. Thoma. Middle row: Ruth Cooley, Mary S. Rose, Lenna F. Cooper, Helen Anderson. Back row: Emma Feeney, Clyde Schuman, Abby Lillian Marlatt, Martha Koehne

Cooper authored The New Cookery in 1913. The cookbook offered nutritionally balanced vegetarian recipes which incorporated legume, nut and wheat based meat substitutes. Her cookbook has been cited as an influential vegetarian Seventh-day Adventist cookbook that used dairy and eggs products but no stimulants such as coffee or tea. Her vegetarian cuisine was used as medical nutritional therapy for patients at the Battle Creek Sanitarium.

Cooper obtained her bachelor's degree (1916) and master's degree (1927) from Columbia University. She was food service director to Michigan State University. In 1930, she became chief dietitian at Montefiore Hospital.

The Distinguished Lecture Award, formerly known as the Lenna Frances Cooper Memorial Lecture Award, was established in her memory.

== Publications ==
- The New Cookery (Good Health Publishing, 1913)
- How to Cut Food Costs (1917)
- Nutrition in Health and Disease (1947)
