= Journal of the Academy of Nutrition and Dietetics =

- Discipline: Nutrition, dietetics
- Language: English
- Edited by: Linda G. Snetselaar

Publication details
- Former name: Journal of the American Dietetic Association
- History: 1925–present
- Publisher: Elsevier
- Frequency: Monthly
- Open access: Hybrid
- Impact factor: 6.124 (2018)

Standard abbreviations
- ISO 4: J. Acad. Nutr. Diet.

Indexing
- CODEN: JADAAE
- ISSN: 2212-2672
- LCCN: 27010036
- OCLC no.: 768761705

Links
- Journal homepage; Online access; Online archive; Journal information on publisher's website

The Journal of the Academy of Nutrition and Dietetics is the monthly peer-reviewed scientific journal of the Academy of Nutrition and Dietetics published by Elsevier. It covers research in nutritional science, medical nutrition therapy, public health nutrition, food science and biotechnology, foodservice systems, leadership and management, and dietetics education.

== History ==
The journal was established in June 1925 as the quarterly Journal of the American Dietetic Association and obtained its current name in January 2012 as part of an organization-wide name change. The first issue went to 735 Academy members and a few paid subscribers.

The first editor-in-chief was Florence H. Smith, who became president of the academy in 1926. The current editor-in-chief is Linda G. Snetselaar.

== Continuing professional education ==
Since March 2005, the journal has offered free continuing professional education (CPE) to academy members, with each issue providing 4 CPE units. CPE represents one of the most frequently read departments in the journal, with 82% of recipients reading these articles "at least sometimes".

== Reader survey ==
The journal, with its publisher Elsevier and Readex Research, conducts a biannual survey of its member readers to determine reader needs and satisfaction. According to the 2010 survey, the journal is the most read dietetics-related publication among academy members—21% more popular than its nearest competitor and at least twice as popular as its other competitors.

== Huddleson and Monsen Awards ==
The journal bestows two awards each year honoring authors and researchers.

The Huddleson Award, named for Mary Pascoe Huddleson, editor of the journal from 1927 to 1946, honors a registered dietitian who was the lead author of a peer-reviewed article that made an important contribution to the dietetics profession and was published in the journal.

The Monsen Award recognizes an academy member's body of research that encompasses a major component of his or her professional efforts and is published in a recognized peer-reviewed scientific journal. This award is named after Elaine Monsen, editor emeritus of the journal, in recognition of her contribution to research literature in nutrition and dietetics throughout her 20 years as editor-in-chief.

== Abstracting and indexing ==
The journal is abstracted and indexed in:

- AGRICOLA
- CAB Abstracts
- Chemical Abstracts Service
- CINAHL
- Current Contents/Agriculture, Biology & Environmental Sciences
- Current Contents/Clinical Medicine
- Embase
- Index Medicus/MEDLINE/PubMed
- Science Citation Index
- Scopus

According to the Journal Citation Reports, the journal has a 2022 impact factor of 6.124.
