= Mary O'Donnell de Garmo =

American educator and clubwoman (1861–1953)

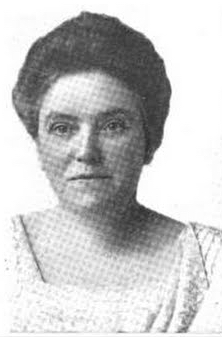
- Mary O'Donnell de Garmo, from a 1913 publication.
- Born: Mary Eloise O'Donnell; November 3, 1861; Covington, Kentucky
- Died: September 24, 1953 (aged 91); Chicago
- Other names: Mrs. Frank de Garmo
- Occupations: Educator, clubwoman
- Children: Mary deGarmo Bryan, Margaret deGarmo

Mary Eloise O'Donnell de Garmo (November 3, 1861 – September 24, 1953) was an American educator and clubwoman, active in Shreveport, St. Louis, and Corpus Christi, on subjects from eugenics and parenting to road improvement and war memorials. She was usually known as Mrs. Frank de Garmo.

== Early life ==
Mary Eloise O'Donnell was born in Covington, Kentucky in 1861, the daughter of Dominick O'Donnell and Sarah Jane Wingler O'Donnell. Her father was born in Ireland. She trained as a teacher in Kentucky and Missouri.

== Career ==
Mary de Garmo taught school before she married in 1890. She founded the Girls' Training School for Neglected Children in Shreveport, and was active in the National Congress of Mothers, organizing and leading the Louisiana and Missouri state chapters. She became known as the originator of "Better Babies Contests", when she created the first such event at the Louisiana State Fair in 1908. The activity spread nationally as a popular way to promote infant health programs and eugenics.

Between 1909 and 1929, she was a leader in clubwork in St. Louis, especially in the Good Roads Movement (because poor quality rural roads were a factor in school attendance). In 1920 she was chair of the Americanization department of the Woman's Chamber of Commerce in St. Louis. She founded the National Society of 1917 World War Registrars, to build a national record of the American men and women who fought in World War I. She wrote a pageant performed by a cast of "several hundred people" at the Armistice Day celebrations in St. Louis in 1921.

Several of her areas of interest intersected in the establishment of the Gold Star Highway designation, making better roads that also served as a memorial to the war's dead and their survivors. In Corpus Christi, she worked to found a county historical museum, and a memorial to World War I veterans and their mothers.

Books by de Garmo included World's Baby Eugenic Almanac for Parents, Road Cadet Patrol and Junior Home Builders, Plan for Developing Country Child Welfare, Biography of Mrs. Frank Augustus Tompkins (1945), and Pathfinders of Texas, 1836 – 1846 (1951).

== Personal life ==
Mary O'Donnell married Frank de Garmo in 1890, in Warrensburg, Missouri. They had two daughters, Mary deGarmo Bryan and Margaret deGarmo Payne, both of whom she educated at home until adolescence. She died in 1953, aged 91 years, in Chicago. Her papers are in the University of Tennessee libraries.
