= Marjorie Hulsizer Copher =

American dietitian

Marjorie Hulsizer Copher (January 26, 1892 – May 19, 1935) was an American dietitian who served in France during World War I.

== Early life ==
Edith Marjorie Hulsizer was born in Flemington, New Jersey, the daughter Abraham Chalmers Hulsizer and Alletta Van Nest Hill Hulsizer. Her father was a lawyer and mayor of Flemington. She attended Reading Academy High School and graduated from Simmons College in 1916 (after starring as Prospero in her class's production of Shakespeare's The Tempest).

== Career ==
Hulsizer worked as a dietitian at hospitals in Massachusetts early in her career. She was one of the charter members of the American Dietetic Association when it was founded in 1917. During World War I, she joined the Peter Bent Brigham Hospital Unit, serving as a dietitian in Étaples and Boulogne-sur-Mer, France, with the British Expeditionary Force from May 1917 to the end of 1918, and then with the American Expeditionary Forces. She was decorated by the British and French for her wartime service. "We draw rations every morning of bacon, rice, onions, potatoes, tinned meat, milk, cocoa, jam, oleomargarine, pork and beans, sugar, salt, tea, cheese, bread, mustard, pepper, pickles, and coal and ice when they have it. I feed about one hundred and twenty people," she wrote in an account of her responsibilities.

For a brief time after the war, she worked at the City Hospital in Buffalo, New York. From 1921 to 1925, Hulsizer worked at the Barnes-Jewish Hospital in St. Louis, Missouri, as head dietitian. She was active in the League of Women Voters and Washington University Woman's Club.

== Personal life and legacy ==
In 1924, Marjorie Hulsizer married Dr. Glover Hancock Copher, a surgeon and professor at Washington University School of Medicine. They had a daughter, Marjorie Ann Copher (White). Copher died in St. Louis in 1935, aged 43 years, from bronchogenic carcinoma, a form of lung cancer. The Library of Congress holds a small collection of Hulsizer's letters home from the war.

The Academy of Nutrition and Dietetics's highest award is the Marjorie Hulsizer Copher Award, given annually since 1945 to a member who "has contributed to the profession through extensive, active participation and service to the profession of nutrition and dietetics, both within and outside of the Academy".
