= Hunt's =

Brand of canned tomato products

- Product type: Preserved tomato products
- Current owner: Conagra Brands (Century Pacific Food in the Philippines)
- Introduced: 1888; 138 years ago
- Website: www.hunts.com

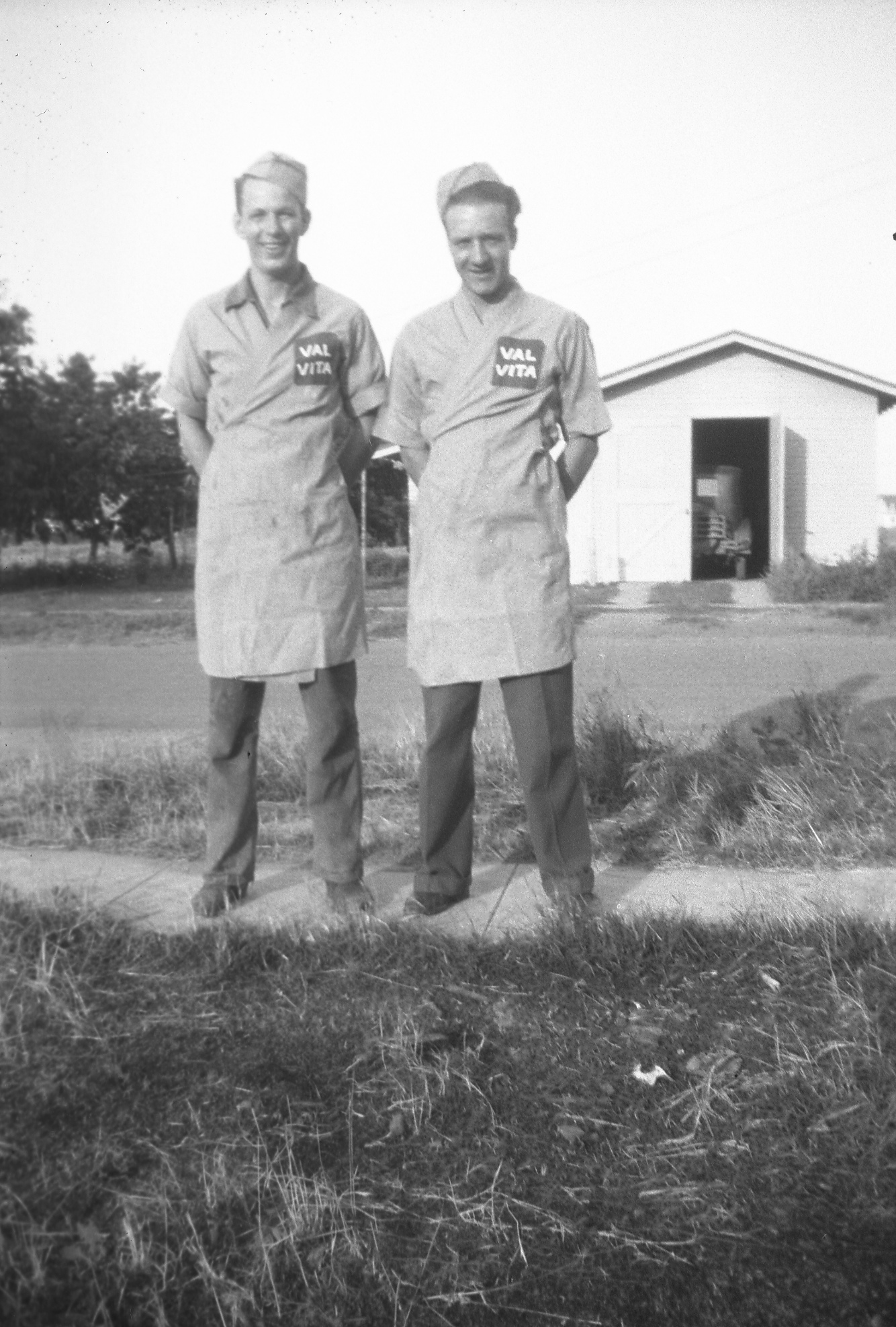
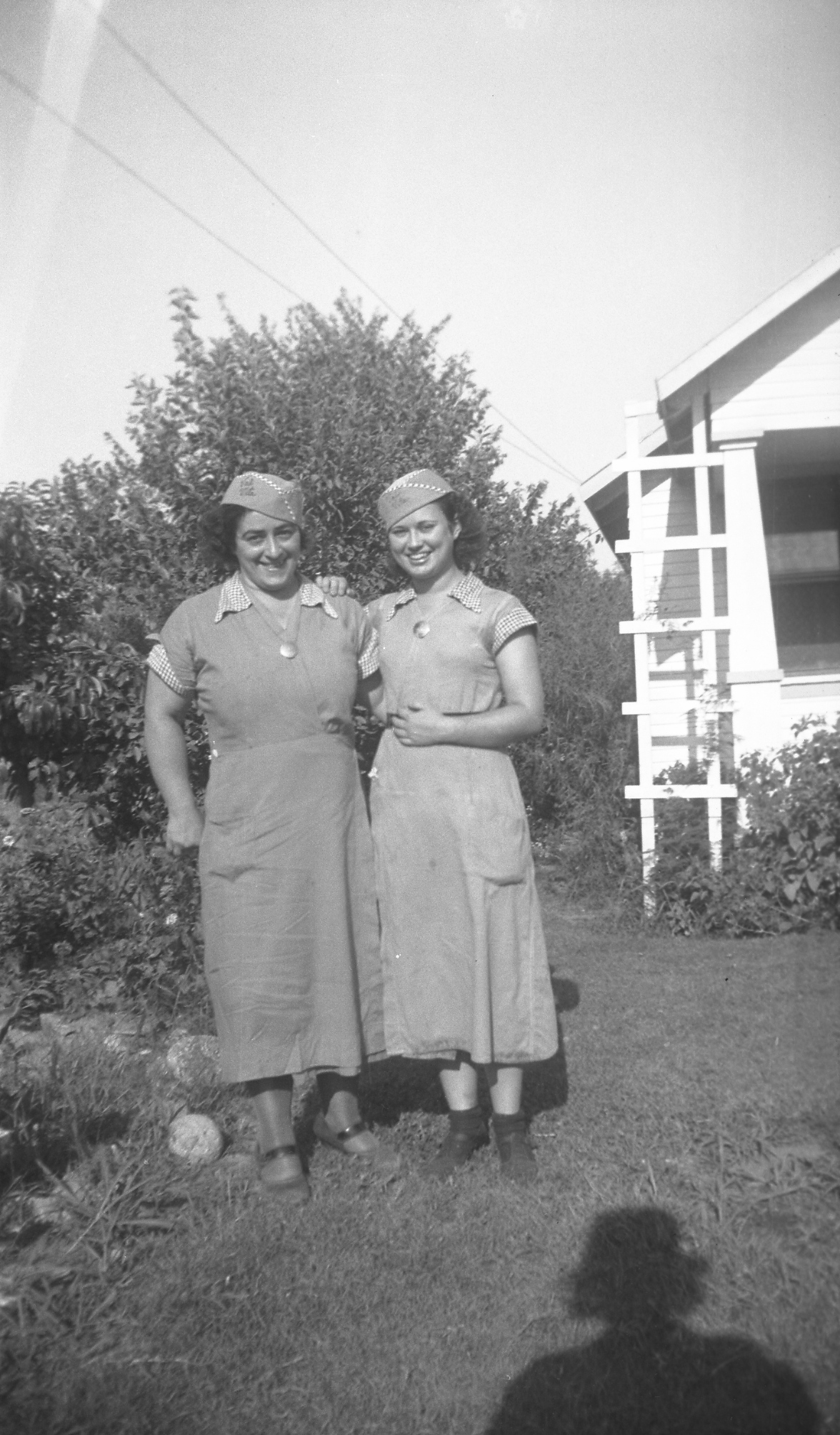
Workers at Val Vita, which later
became Hunt Foods in
Fullerton, California (c. 1940)

Hunt's is a brand of preserved tomato products owned by Conagra Brands.

== History ==
The company was founded in 1888, in Sebastopol, California, as the Hunt Bros. Fruit Packing Co., by Joseph and William Hunt. The brothers relocated to nearby Santa Rosa in 1890, and then to Hayward in 1895. This small canning operation grew rapidly, focused on canning the products of California's booming fruit and vegetable industries. By 1941, the plant shipped a hundred million cans of soup, fruits, vegetables, and juices annually. In 1943, Hunt's was taken over by Norton Simon's Val Vita Food Products – a competing firm founded in the early 1930s and based in Fullerton, California. The merged firm kept the Hunt's name and incorporated as Hunt Food and Industries, Inc. The new management led by Norton Simon decided to focus the company on canned tomato products, particularly prepared tomato sauce.

The Wesson Oil & Snowdrift Company merged with Hunt's Foods, Inc. in 1960 to become Hunt-Wesson Foods. Hunt-Wesson merged with the McCall Corporation and Canada Dry to form the holding company Norton Simon Inc. in 1968. By 1978, Hunt-Wesson Foods, Inc. entered into a joint venture with the Ayala-owned Pure Foods Corporation, its distributor in the Philippines since the late 1950s, to form Hunt-Pure Foods, Inc. based in Makati, Metro Manila, for marketing processed foods in the Philippines and abroad; Elbert Santos served as its general manager.

Norton Simon was acquired by Esmark in 1983, which merged with Beatrice Foods the next year. In 1985, Kohlberg Kravis Roberts acquired Beatrice with the goal of selling off businesses. Hunt-Wesson, the company which included the Hunt's brands, was sold in 1990 to agribusiness giant ConAgra Foods. In 1999, ConAgra Grocery Products (the former Hunt-Wesson) moved from Fullerton to Irvine, California. The Irvine office was closed in 2006.

In 1988, Hunt's catsup changed its label to ketchup. In May 2010, Hunt's ketchup temporarily removed high fructose corn syrup from its ingredients. The new ingredients were "tomatoes, sugar, vinegar, salt and other seasonings". The product changed back to high fructose corn syrup in May 2012.

In December 2018, NFL quarterback Patrick Mahomes signed an endorsement deal with Hunt's. Mahomes is well-known for his love of ketchup, even putting it on unconventional items such as steak and macaroni and cheese.

== Product branding ==
Besides several varieties of canned tomato sauce, the Hunt's brand appears on tomato paste, diced, whole, stewed, pureed and crushed tomatoes, organic and No Salt Added tomato products, spaghetti sauce, ketchup, barbecue sauce and Hunt's Family Favorites line of canned recipe helpers. The Hunt's brand name has also appeared on canned potatoes, canned peaches, Manwich brand sloppy joe products and Hunt's Snack Pack Pudding. Reddi-Wip whipped cream was originally also under the Hunt's banner.

== See also ==
- H. J. Heinz Company
