= International Food Information Council =

IFIC
- International Food Information Council
- Tax ID no.: 52-1439244
- Revenue: $5,166,092 (2013)
- Expenses: $4,964,113 (2013)

Founded in 1985, the International Food Information Council (IFIC) is a nonprofit organization supported by the food, beverage, and agricultural industries.

According to the Center for Media and Democracy, "In reality, IFIC is a public relations arm of the food, beverage and agricultural industries, which provide the bulk of its funding." The vast majority of organizational revenues are generated by its membership fees. The members of the IFIC consists of companies with food and food related sales, companies such as packaging or equipment suppliers, service providers, design firms, inspection/testing organization, and canning/bottling companies, with an interest in nutrition and food safety issues, and non-industry organizations, such as research institutions, foundations, and Associations, with an interest in nutrition and food safety issues.
