= Hunt's Snack Pack =

Pudding snack brand

Snack Pack
- Product type: Packaged pudding and gelatin
- Current owner: ConAgra Foods
- Country: United States
- Introduced: 1968
- Website: www.snackpack.com

Snack Pack is a brand of pudding and gelatin dessert snacks manufactured since 1968 by ConAgra Foods.

== About ==
Snack Packs were introduced in 1968 in single-serve aluminum/metal cans, before switching to plastic cups in 1984 and clear plastic cups in 1990. They are marketed as healthy treats for children, with its calcium content often being emphasized. In the 1970s Snack Pack was sold in Australia via the Foster Clark company with the television slogan "if it wasn't for a Snack Pack, a kid'd starve".

== In popular culture ==
Snack Pack appears in the movie Billy Madison as it is the title character's favorite dessert. He is disappointed that Juanita packed him a banana instead of a Snack Pack in his lunch, so he attempts to take one from a schoolboy in exchange for his banana during lunch time, but fails. Billy eventually gets a whole pack of Snack Packs as a present from Miss Vaughn when celebrating passing Third Grade.

In episode 16 of season 3 That '70s Show, Kitty Forman gives Fez and Hyde a pair of Snack Packs. However, instead of the period-accurate aluminum containers of the 1970s the Snack Packs are in the modern-day clear plastic current containers.

In Episode 14 of Season 2 of How I Met Your Mother, Marshal demands a Snack Pack from a child in Lily's kindergarten class after spraying his pants with juice for blackmailing him with the Super Bowl results.

In Episode 8 of Season 1 of the Netflix series Stranger Things (Chapter 8: The Upside Down), Dustin and Lucas raid the school cafeteria for a hidden stash of chocolate Snack Packs.
