= George A. Berlinghof =

German-born American architect (1860–1944)

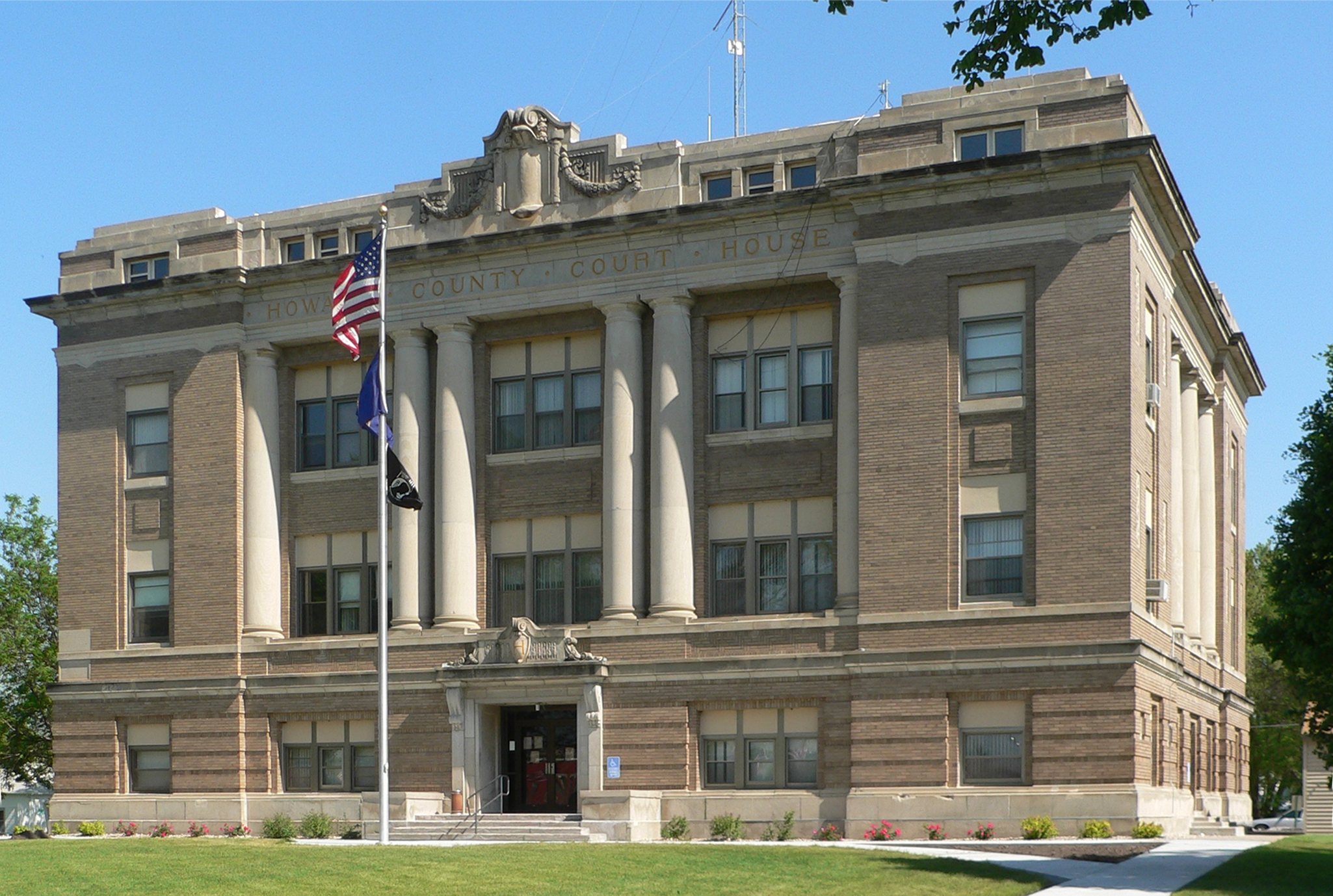
Howard County Courthouse, St. Paul, Nebraska

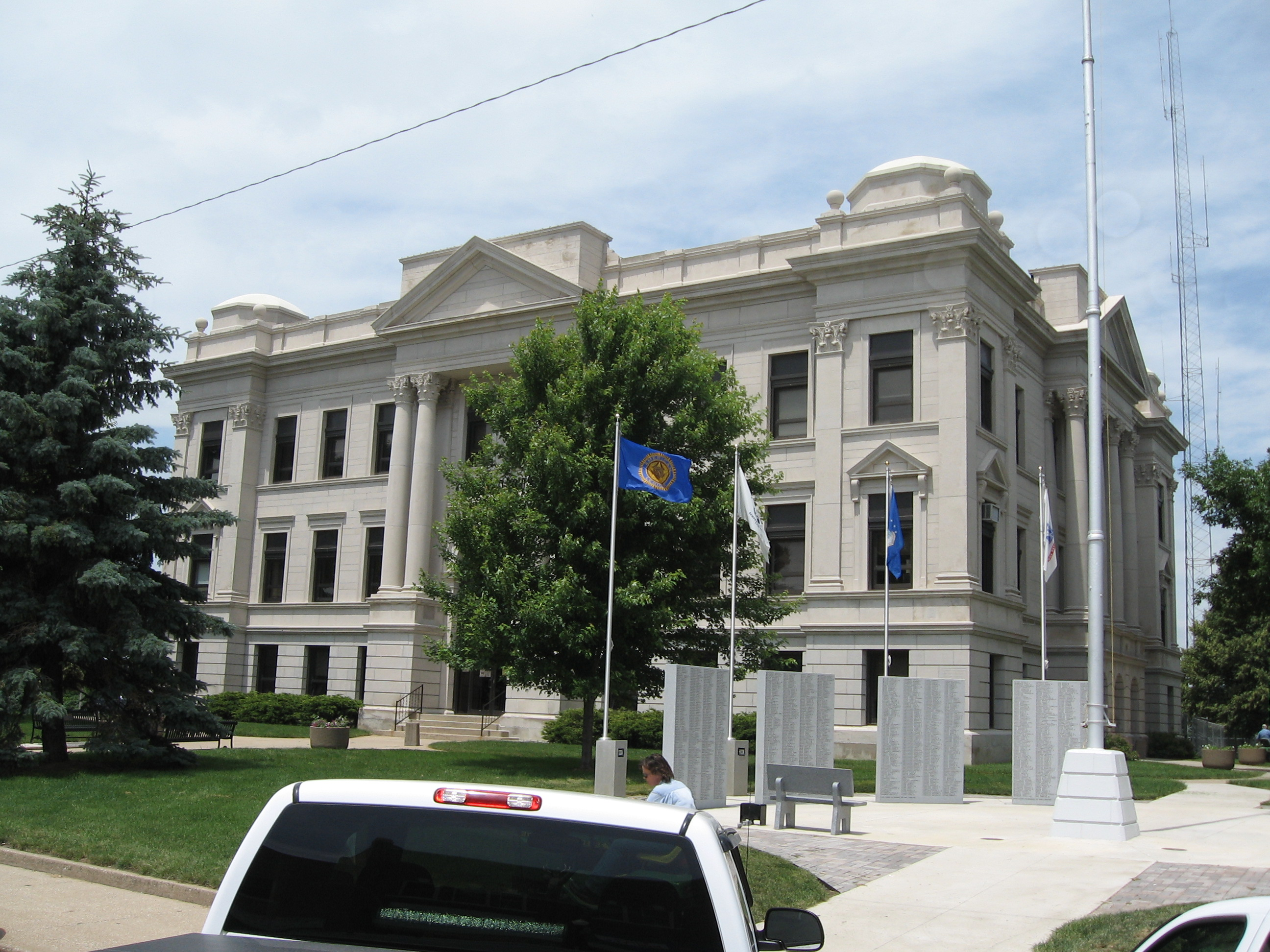
Crawford County Courthouse, Iowa, a Beaux-Arts building

George Anthony Berlinghof (born Georg Anton Berlinghof; July 24, 1860 – May 30, 1944) was a German-born architect who designed a number of important buildings in Lincoln and other cities in Nebraska. Some of his surviving works are listed on the National Register of Historic Places.

Berlinghof was born in Free City of Frankfurt, to Georg Heinrich Berlinghof and Katharina Kretschmann Berlinghof. He immigrated to the United States in 1881. As of 1898, he was working as an architect in Beatrice, Nebraska, and as of 1906 he was established in Lincoln, where he remained active as an architect until 1930. Between 1911 and 1918, he partnered with Ellery L. Davis in the firm of Berlinghof and Davis. According to the Nebraska Historical Society, the firm designed "many important structures" in the city, attaining "a position of prominence" there. George Berlinghof and Ellery Davis also designed many schools and courthouses throughout Nebraska. Their firm survives as the Davis Design firm.

Berlinghof died in Lincoln, Nebraska on May 30, 1944, aged 83. The Nebraska Historical Society holds a collection of his architectural drawings, including both line drawings and watercolor renderings.

== Works ==
Buildings credited to Berlinghof include:

- Bancroft School, Lincoln
- Beatrice City Library, 220 N. 5th St., Beatrice, Nebraska (NRHP-listed, credited to Berlinghof)
- Burr Block, 1206 O St., Lincoln (NRHP-listed, credited to Berlinghof & Davis)
- Chadron Public Library, 507 Bordeaux St., Chadron, Nebraska (NRHP-listed, credited to Berlinghof)
- Colfax County Courthouse, Schuyler, Nebraska (NRHP-listed, credited to Berlinghof)
- Crawford County Courthouse, Broadway between Avenues B and C, Denison, Iowa (NRHP-listed, credited to Berlinghof)
- Deutsche Evangelisch Lutherische Zion Kirche, Staplehurst, Nebraska (NRHP-listed, credited to Berlinghof & Davis)
- Franklin County Courthouse, 15th Ave. between N and O Sts., Franklin, Nebraska (NRHP-listed, credited to Berlinghof)
- Greeley County Courthouse, Kildare Street, Greeley, Nebraska (NRHP-listed, credited to Berlinghof & Davis)
- Howard County Courthouse, Indian St. between 6th and 7th Sts., St. Paul, Nebraska (NRHP-listed, credited to Berlinghof & Davis)
- Harry T. Jones House, 136 N. Columbia Ave., Seward, Nebraska (NRHP-listed, credited to Berlinghof)
- Kearney County Courthouse, 5th St. between Colorado and Minden Aves., Minden, Nebraska (NRHP-listed, credited to Berlinghof)
- Lincoln High School, Lincoln
- Lincoln County Courthouse, Dewey St. between 3rd and 4th Sts., North Platte, Nebraska, built in two phases, 1921-1924 and 1931-1932 (NRHP-listed, credited to Berlinghof)
- Miller & Paine, 13th and O St., Lincoln
- Nemaha County Courthouse, 1824 N St., Auburn, Nebraska (NRHP-listed, credited to Berlinghof)
- Carnegie Library, 9th and Vermont Sts., Lawrence, Kansas (NRHP-listed, credited to Berlinghof)
- Scottish Rite Temple, 332 Centennial Mall S., Lincoln (NRHP-listed, credited to Berlinghof & Davis)
- Security Mutual Building, Lincoln
- Seward County Courthouse, Seward between 5th and 6th streets, Seward, Nebraska (NRHP-listed, credited to Berlinghof)
- Seward County Courthouse Square Historic District, Seward, Nebraska, credited to George Berlinghoff)
- R.O. Stake House, 145 S. 28th St., Lincoln (NRHP-listed, credited to Berlinghof)
- Dr. A. O. Thomas House, 2222 9th Ave., Kearney, Nebraska, built in 1906 (NRHP-listed, credited to Berlinghof)
- One or more properties in Willow-Bluff-3rd Street Historic District, Council Bluffs, Iowa (NRHP-listed, credited to Bell & Berlinghoff)
