= Gold and Company Store Building =

Historic building in Lincoln, Nebraska, U.S.

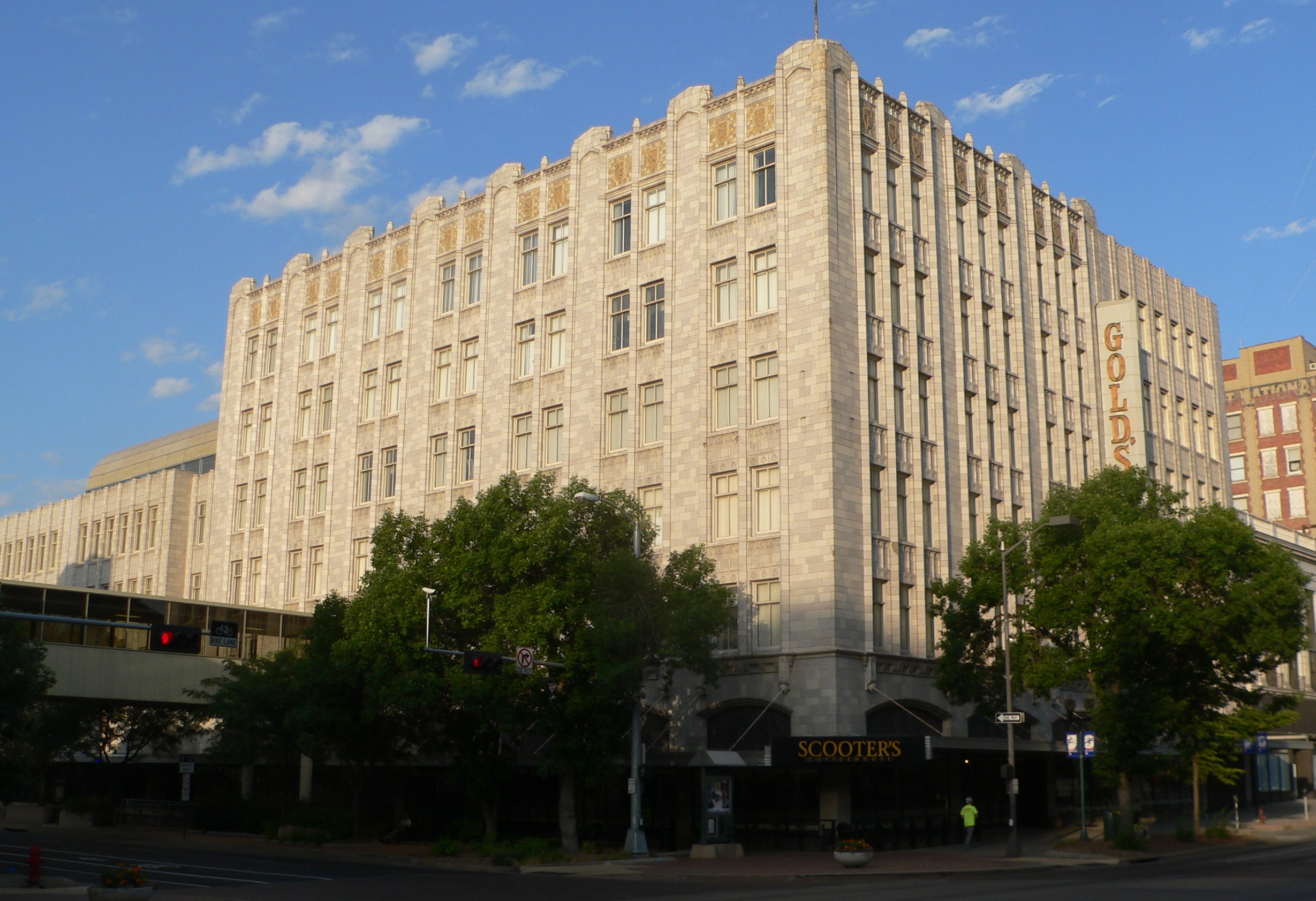
- Gold and Company Store Building in 2012
- Interactive map of the Gold and Company Store Building area

General information
- Location: 1033 O Street, Lincoln, Nebraska, U.S.
- Coordinates: 40.813314601920695°N 96.7060125264329°W
- Gold and Company Store Building
- U.S. National Register of Historic Places
- Area: 3 acres (1.2 ha)
- Built: 1924
- Architect: Davis & Wilson
- Architectural style: Late Gothic Revival, Art Deco
- Demolished: 2023 (in-part)
- NRHP reference No.: 82000609
- Added to NRHP: October 19, 1982

The Gold and Company Store Building, commonly referred to as the Gold's Building, is a historic commercial building in Lincoln, Nebraska, United States. It was built in 1924 for the Gold and Company Store, co-founded by William Gold and later managed by his son Nathan, until its 1964 merger with J. L. Brandeis and Sons. The building was designed in the Gothic Revival and Art Deco styles. Since 2025, the building currently houses a Hampton Hotel. It has been listed on the National Register of Historic Places since October 19, 1982.

== History ==
The Gold and Company Store building was announced in November 1923 and would be built for the Gold and Company Store. Gold and Company was founded in 1902 and was originally located on the North Part of the block. The building officially opened in November 1924. In 1929, two additions were built adjacent to the building.

The building underwent several other expansions in 1931, 1935, 1947, and 1951. In 1964 Gold & Company merged with J. L. Brandeis and Sons and the building continued operation under the Gold's name. In 1977, Brandeis opened a new location and later closed their location at the Gold's Building in 1980. The building was listed on the National Register of Historic Places on October 19, 1982.

In 2021, the building was sold to developer Mike Works. By the 2020s, the building had become largely uninhabitable. In 2022, a redevelopment plan was announced for the site, which would demolish the South side of the building, and would renovate the original building into a hotel. In 2023, demolition began on the South side of the building and was completed by May of that same year. The hotel officially opened on October 20, 2025 as a Hampton Hotel.

== Design ==
The original Gold and Company Store Building is six stories tall, with the additions only being four stories tall. The building's design is a late Gothic Revival combined with Art Deco. The building was designed by Davis & Wilson.
