= August Beresheim House =

Historic house in Iowa, United States

- U.S. National Register of Historic Places
- U.S. Historic district – Contributing property
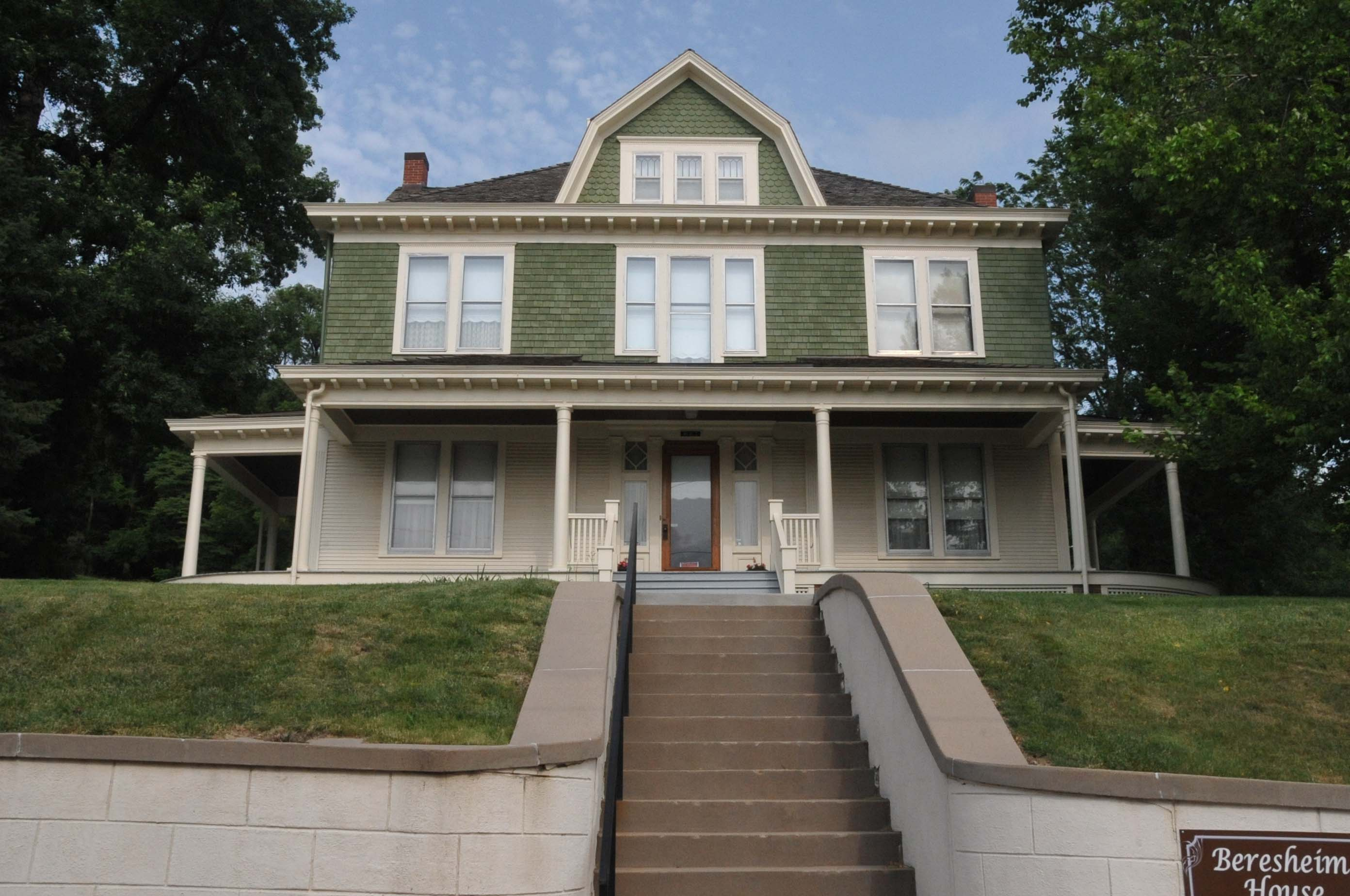

- Location within Iowa Location within the United States
- Location: 621 3rd St. Council Bluffs, Iowa
- Coordinates: 41°15′16.9″N 95°50′52.5″W
- Built: 1899
- Part of: Willow-Bluff-3rd Street Historic District (ID05001019)
- NRHP reference No.: 76000802
- Added to NRHP: August 13, 1976

The August Beresheim House is an historic building located in Council Bluffs, Iowa, United States. Beresheim served as the president of Council Bluffs Savings Bank. His house was built in 1899 in a neighborhood where many influential citizens of that city resided. It is next door to the Grenville M. Dodge House, who instrumental in establishing the bank, and they are the only two residences on their side of street. The three-story frame house is a combination of several styles. The dominant feature of this symmetrical-plan structure is its wrap-around porch. It was listed on the National Register of Historic Places in 1976. In 2005 it was included as a contributing property in the Willow-Bluff-3rd Street Historic District.
