= Greeley County Courthouse =

Greeley County Courthouse may refer to:

- Greeley County Courthouse (Kansas), Tribune, Kansas
  - Old Greeley County Courthouse (Kansas), Tribune, Kansas
- Greeley County Courthouse (Nebraska), Greeley Center, Nebraska
