= Coursey =

Coursey is a surname. Notable people with the surname include:

- Cecil Calvert Coursey (1898–1956), American architect
- Chris Coursey (born 1954), American politician and journalist
- John P. Coursey (1914–1992), American brigadier general
- Will Coursey (born 1978), American politician
