= Howard County Courthouse (Nebraska) =

- U.S. National Register of Historic Places
- U.S. Historic district
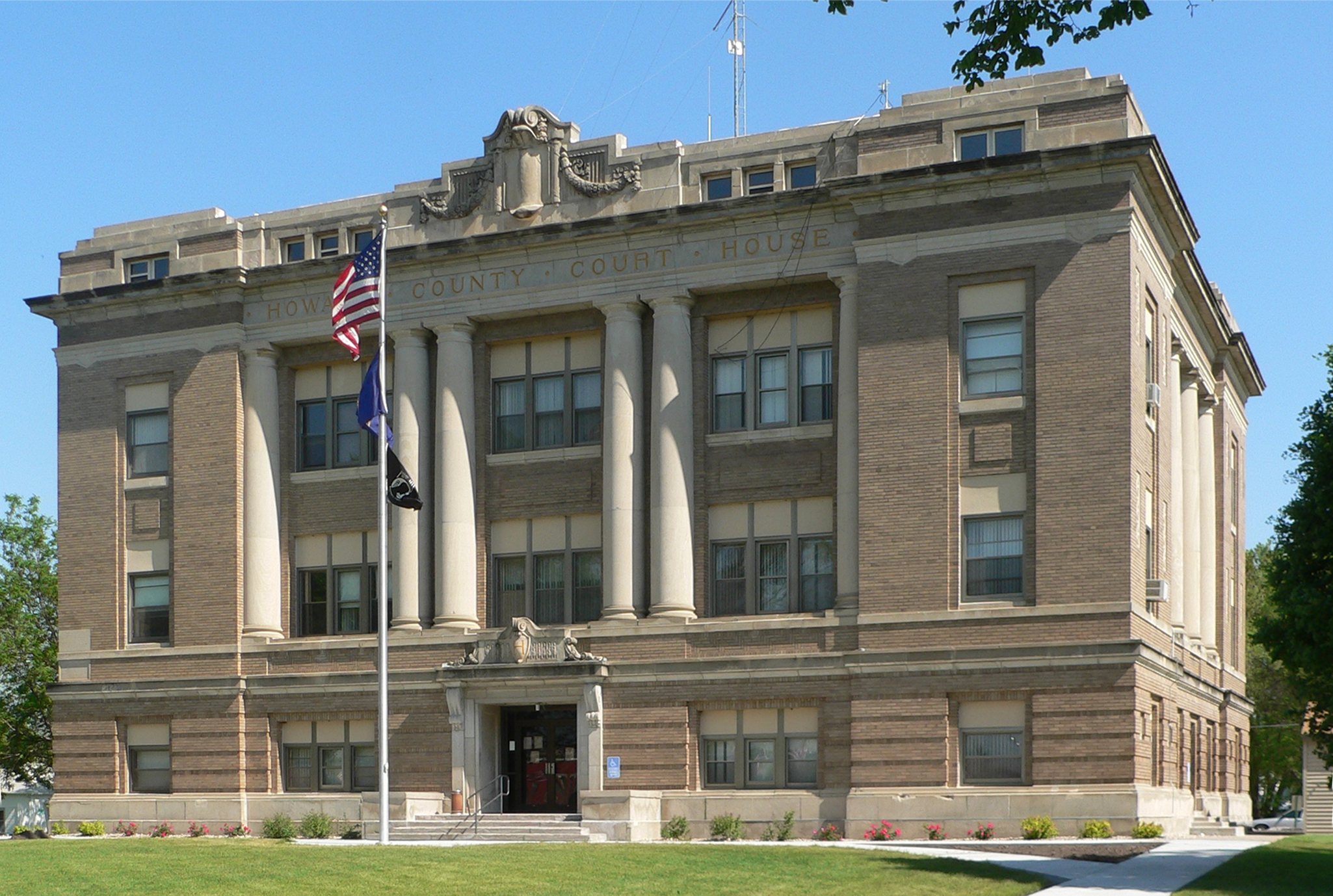

- Location within Nebraska Location within the United States
- Interactive map showing the location for Howard County Courthouse
- Location: Indian St. between 6th and 7th Sts., St. Paul, Nebraska
- Coordinates: 41°12′54″N 98°27′26″W
- Area: 2 acres (0.81 ha)
- Built: 1912
- Architect: Berlinghof & Davis; Berlinghof, George A.
- Architectural style: Classical Revival
- MPS: County Courthouses of Nebraska MPS
- NRHP reference No.: 89002233
- Added to NRHP: January 10, 1990

The Howard County Courthouse, on Indian St. between 6th and 7th Sts. in St. Paul, Nebraska, was built in 1912. It was designed by Berlinghof & Davis and George A. Berlinghof in Classical Revival style.

It is a four-story building made of brick, partly faced with Bedford, Indiana limestone.

It was listed on the National Register of Historic Places in 1990. The listing included one contributing building and one contributing object.

It was deemed significant architecturally and for its association with local politics and government of Howard County, Nebraska. It was asserted to be "an important example" of Nebraska architect George A. Berlinghof's work, in this case as part of Berlinghof & Davis; it included features later used by Berlinghof in the Greeley County Courthouse and the Franklin County Courthouse and therefore demonstrated "the evolution of his designs."
