= Kearney County Courthouse =

- U.S. National Register of Historic Places
- U.S. Historic district
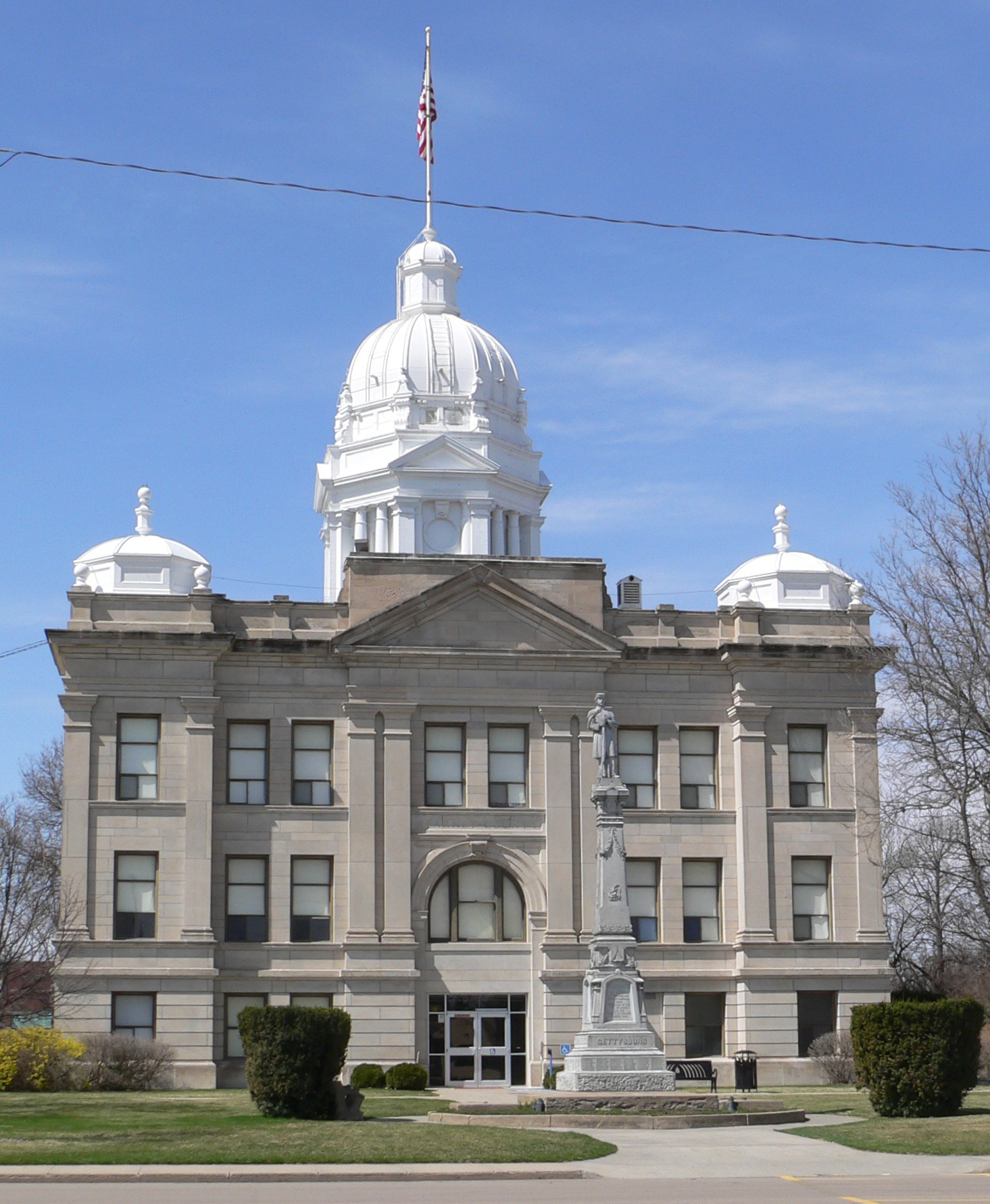
- The courthouse in 2010

- Location within Nebraska Location within the United States
- Location: 5th Street between Colorado and Minden Avenues, Minden, Nebraska
- Coordinates: 40°29′56″N 98°56′53″W
- Area: less than one acre
- Built: 1906
- Architect: George A. Berlinghof
- Architectural style: Classical Revival
- MPS: County Courthouses of Nebraska MPS
- NRHP reference No.: 89002234
- Added to NRHP: January 10, 1990

The Kearney County Courthouse is a historic building in Minden, Nebraska, and the courthouse of Kearney County, Nebraska. It was the third building to house the county courthouse when it was completed in 1906–1907. Prior buildings had been completed in 1878 and 1879. The third courthouse was designed in the Classical Revival style by architect George A. Berlinghof. Writing for the National Register of Historic Places form, Barbara Beving Long highlights the "symmetrical arrangement, monumental proportions (especially the large smooth squared pilasters), pedimented pavilions, smooth surface, and unadorned parapet, [...] the attractive roundarched entries with keystones, squared pilasters (at corners and pavilions), ground floor arcades, and the mighty central dome resting on its octagonal drum." She adds, "Rectangular windows have transoms and lack special lintel or sill treatment." The building has been listed on the National Register of Historic Places since January 10, 1990.
