= Lincoln County Courthouse (Nebraska) =

- U.S. National Register of Historic Places
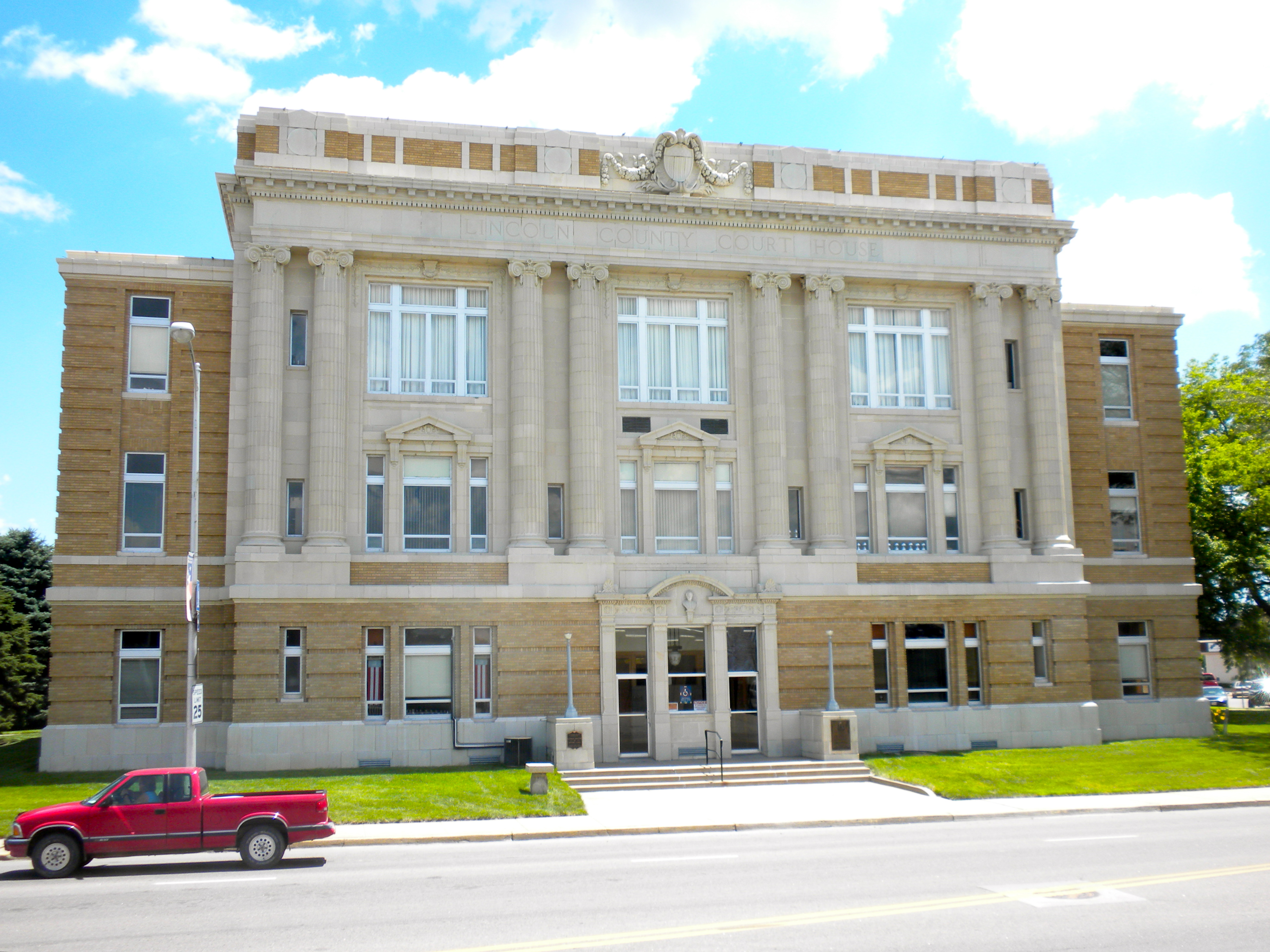
- The courthouse in 2010

- Location within Nebraska Location within the United States
- Location: Dewey Street between 3rd and 4th Streets, North Platte, Nebraska
- Coordinates: 41°08′10″N 100°45′45″W
- Area: 1.5 acres (0.61 ha)
- Built: 1921
- Built by: H.R. McMichael
- Architect: George A. Berlinghof, Cecil Calvert Coursey
- Architectural style: Classical Revival
- MPS: County Courthouses of Nebraska MPS
- NRHP reference No.: 89002224
- Added to NRHP: January 10, 1990

The Lincoln County Courthouse is a historic two-story building in North Platte, Nebraska, and the courthouse of Lincoln County, Nebraska. It was built in 1921–1924, and again in 1931–1932, by H.R. McMichael. The building was designed in the Classical Revival and Beaux-Arts styles by architects George A. Berlinghof and Cecil Calvert Coursey. It has been listed on the National Register of Historic Places since January 10, 1990.
