= Chadron Public Library =

Historic library in Nebraska, U.S.

- U.S. National Register of Historic Places
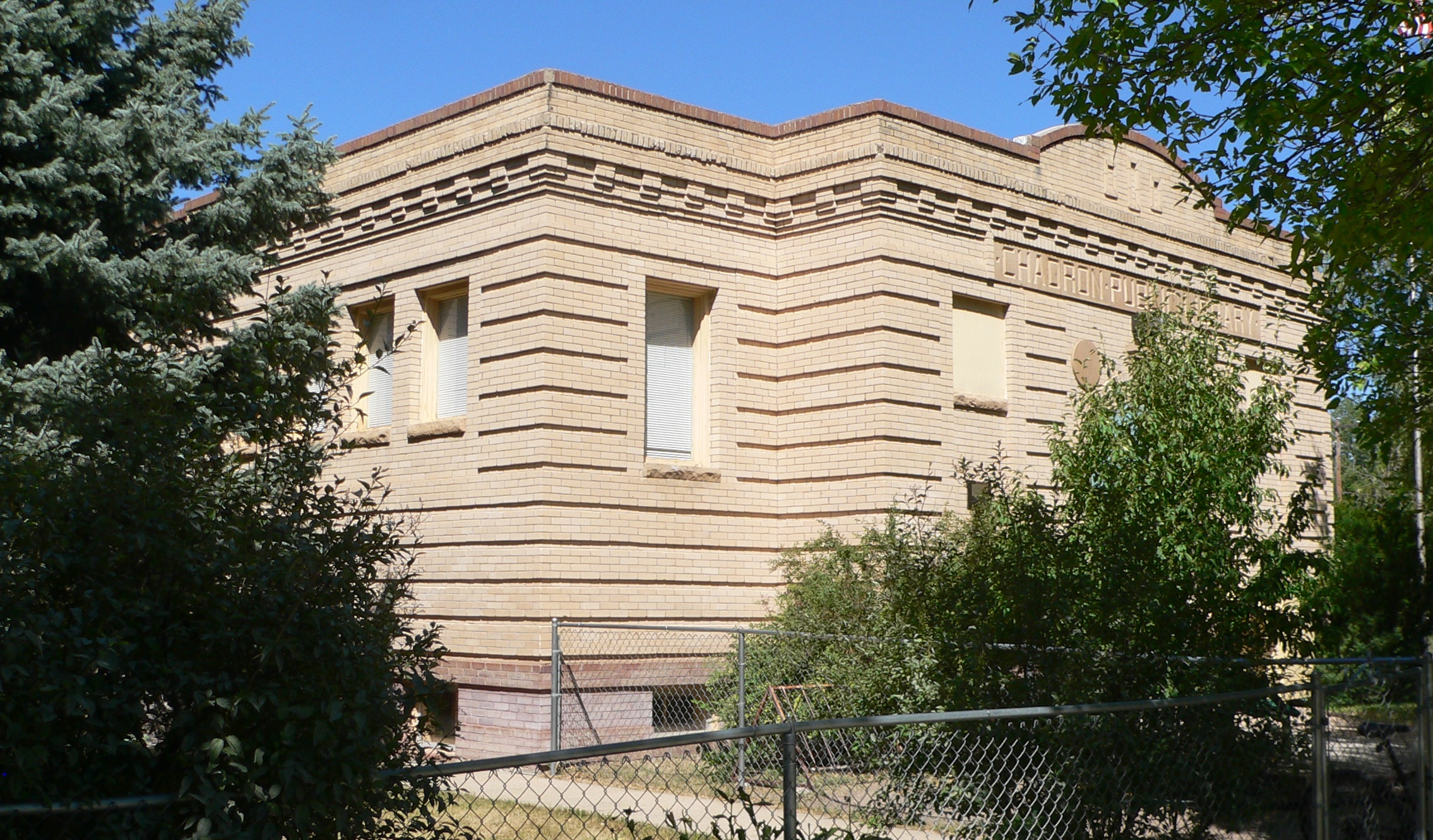

- Location within Nebraska Location within the United States
- Location: 507 Bordeaux St., Chadron, Nebraska
- Coordinates: 42°49′35″N 102°59′58″W
- Area: less than one acre
- Built by: Black Hills Company
- Architect: George A. Berlinghof
- Architectural style: Classical Revival
- NRHP reference No.: 90000985
- Added to NRHP: June 21, 1990

The Chadron Public Library, at 507 Bordeaux St. in Chadron, Nebraska, is a historic Carnegie library in a Classical Revival-style building designed by architect George A. Berlinghof. It was listed on the National Register of Historic Places in 1990.

It was funded by a $5,000 Carnegie grant upon a second application, after the first was rejected. It was designed for just $100 by "noted Lincoln architect" George A. Berlinghof, who happened to be working in Chadron on a larger commission. The contractor was the Black Hills Company, a Deadwood architecture and contracting firm.
