= Berlinghof and Davis Design Firm =

Architecture firm based in Nebraska, USA

George A. Berlinghof and Ellery L. Davis, Nebraska based architects, were inspired by neoclassical style and the architecture of the Chicago skyscrapers. After working in Beatrice, Nebraska, Berlinghof moved to Lincoln and started his influential relationship with Davis. Berlinghof gave Davis the credibility to launch his career. During their partnership (1911-1917), they designed more than twelve buildings together, most of which are still in use to this day, solidifying their importance in American Midwest architectural design of the early 20th century. They were a major part of the move towards historicism in Nebraska. By bringing neoclassical and romantic, victorian architecture back, the firm started a trend of design that referenced former architectural periods in Lincoln and surrounding areas.. Berlinghof and Davis worked together for a period of 6 years, wherein they designed many note-worthy structures for Nebraska that are still in use today including Lincoln High School (Lincoln, Nebraska), Miller and Paine Department Store and the Security Mutual Building.Most of the buildings designed by the Berlinghof and Davis Firm are still in use today. Though some, like the University of Nebraska–Lincoln Law Building, have been remodeled and repurposed, the outer facades still remain as tribute to the original design. Some of their designs are now listed on the National Register of Historic Places and many drawings and plans are kept by the Nebraska State Historical Society. Though the firm of Berlinghof and Davis was disbanded shortly after conception, the amount of work achieved in that time was not only impressive in quality but also vast in volume.

Davis left Berlinghof and Davis in 1917 to start his own architectural firm. In 1921 Davis hired University of Nebraska graduate Walter F. Wilson, forming the firm Davis and Wilson. From 1923 to the end of World War II, Davis and Wilson designed many projects for Lincoln colleges and universities including structures such as Memorial Stadium (Lincoln), Morrill Hall, the Coliseum, the Student Union and Love Memorial Library. Ellery L. Davis retired from the firm in the early 1930s for health reasons and his son, Ellery H. Davis began to work with the firm in the 1940s. In 1968, twelve years after the death of Ellery L. Davis, Davis and Wilson was renamed Davis, Fenton, Stange and Darling. The firm continued under this name until 1995 when it was changed to its current title of Davis Design.

== Buildings credited to Berlinghof and Davis ==
Building	Year constructed	Location	Construction style
Law Building	1912	1875 N 42nd St., Lincoln, NE 68503	Neo-Classical
Custer County Courthouse	1914	Courthouse Square, Main St., Broken Bow, NE 68822	Neo-Classical
Greeley County Courthouse	1914	Kildare St., Block 28, Greeley, NE 68842	Classical Revival
Howard County Courthouse	1914	6th and Indian St., St. Paul, NE 68873	Classical Revival
Warehouse No. 4/Aerie 147	1914	228 N. 12th St., Lincoln, NE 68508	Neo-Classical Revival
Bancroft School/Bancroft Hall	1915	U and 14th St., Lincoln, NE 68510	Neo-Classical Revival
Lincoln High School	1915	2229 J St., Lincoln, NE 68510	Classical
Burr Block	1916	1206 O St., Lincoln, NE 68508	Romantic Victorian
Commercial Club Building	1916	11th and P St., Lincoln, NE 68508	Neo-Classical
Miller and Paine Department Store	1916	13th and O St., Lincoln, NE 68588	Neo-Classical
Scottish Rite Masonic Center/Scottish Rite Temple	1916	332 Centennial Mall S, Lincoln, NE 68508	Neo-Classical Revival
Our Redeemer Lutheran Church of Marysville	1917	3743 Marysville Rd., Staplehurst, NE 68439	Late Gothic Revival
Plattsmouth High School	1919	814 Main St., Plattsmouth, NE 68043	Mid-Century Modern/Neo-Classical
