= Maurice Lukefahr =

American entomologist (1926–2002)

Maurice James Lukefahr, a pioneer researcher in the fields of host plant resistance and environmental control of cotton insect pests, died in Elsa, Texas in 2002.

== Early career ==
Born in Greeley, Nebraska in 1926, he and his family relocated to Bay City, Texas during the Dust Bowl. He received a B.S. degree from Texas A&I College (now Texas A&M University-Kingsville) in 1950. He received his M.S. (1953) and PhD (1961) degrees from Texas A&M University-College Station in 1961. His graduate research centered on control of the immature stages of the boll weevil and pink bollworm, two economically important insect pests of cultivated cotton.

== Host Plant Resistance ==
In 1953, Lukefahr began a long career as a research scientist with the Agricultural Research Service, an agency of the United States Department of Agriculture. Based primarily at the Brownsville, Texas cotton research station, in 1956 he was the first researcher to identify an alternative host of the boll weevil: Thespesia populnea, an ornamental plant popular in the Lower Rio Grande Valley of Texas. He subsequently identified several other alternative host plants (including the weevil's likely original host) that have proved critical to the understanding of boll weevil ecology. These discoveries helped to explain the failure of subsequent large-scale, expensive and environmentally damaging eradication campaigns in the US and elsewhere.

Lukefahr also showed in 1957 that the pink bollworm enters diapause in response to the shortened day lengths of early fall. These findings were used to improve an existing control program based on early harvest and mandatory areawide stalk destruction.

In 1969 he received a Rockefeller Foundation grant to develop strains of cotton that were naturally resistant to insect pests, that could be grown in developing countries without the extensive use of costly, environmentally damaging synthetic pesticides. He developed several such varieties that contained very high levels of gossypol (a natural insect toxin) and that manifested physical features (such as glabrous leaf and stem surfaces) that decreased their suitability for insect egg deposition.

== Other accomplishments ==
In 1979 Lukefahr retired from the USDA and for the next 13 years worked in Nigeria, Brazil, and Niger under the auspices of various United Nations-affiliated agencies. His research focused on developing strains of cowpea, millet, sorghum, and tropical bean with improved genetic and environmental host plant resistance to insect pests. While in Brazil he contributed to the development of a pest management program for the newly introduced boll weevil, which had devastated cotton production in that country.

From 1992 until his death in 2002 he worked as senior research scientist and Research Scientist Emeritus at Rio Farms in Monte Alto, Texas, a research and demonstration farm in the Lower Rio Grande Valley of Texas. At Rio Farms he investigated alternative crops for local farmers, such as grape, blackberry, and tropical bean, that might reduce dependence on large-scale, water- and chemical- intensive row crops.

Lukefahr authored or co-authored over 400 peer-reviewed publications as well as several books and monographs.
