= Wickham–De Vol House =

Historic house in Iowa, United States

- U.S. National Register of Historic Places
- U.S. Historic district – Contributing property
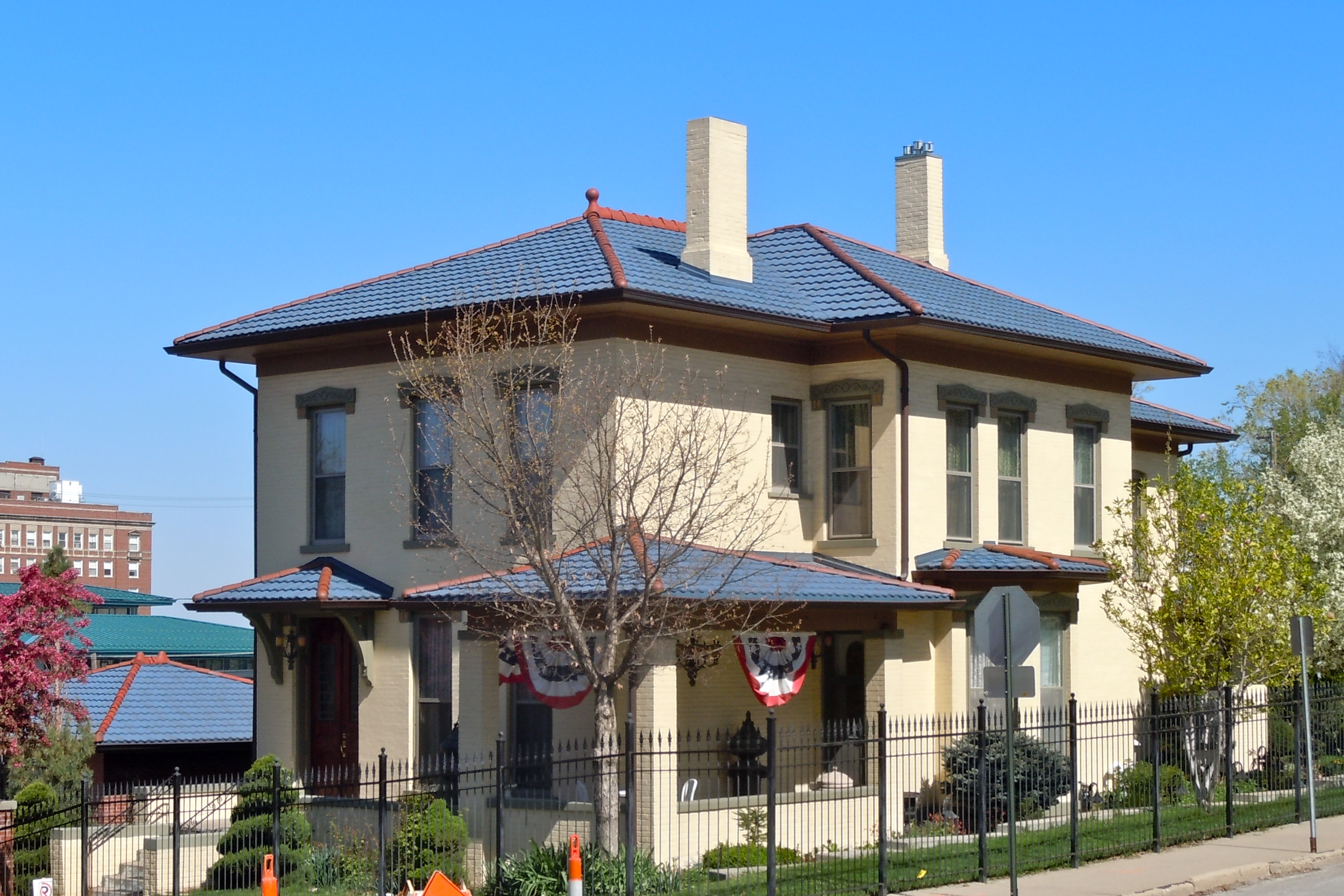

- Location within Iowa Location within the United States
- Location: 332 Willow Ave. Council Bluffs, Iowa
- Coordinates: 41°15′29.7″N 95°50′55″W
- Built: 1878
- Built by: Owen P. Wickham
- Part of: Willow-Bluff-3rd Street Historic District (ID05001019)
- NRHP reference No.: 95000557
- Added to NRHP: May 4, 1995

The Wickham–De Vol House is an historic building located in Council Bluffs, Iowa, United States. The house was occupied by two prominent families. O.P. Wickham was a prominent contractor and brick manufacturer who built the house in 1878, and the De Vols, who altered its appearance in 1913, operated a retail hardware business. The two-story brick house was constructed using the Italianate style with Eastlake detailing. After its renovation it took on more of a clean, modern, and horizontal appearance after its roof line and porches were altered. The house was listed on the National Register of Historic Places in 1995. In 2005 it was included as a contributing property in the Willow-Bluff-3rd Street Historic District.
