= Dr. A.O. Thomas House =

- Dr. A. O. Thomas House
- U.S. National Register of Historic Places
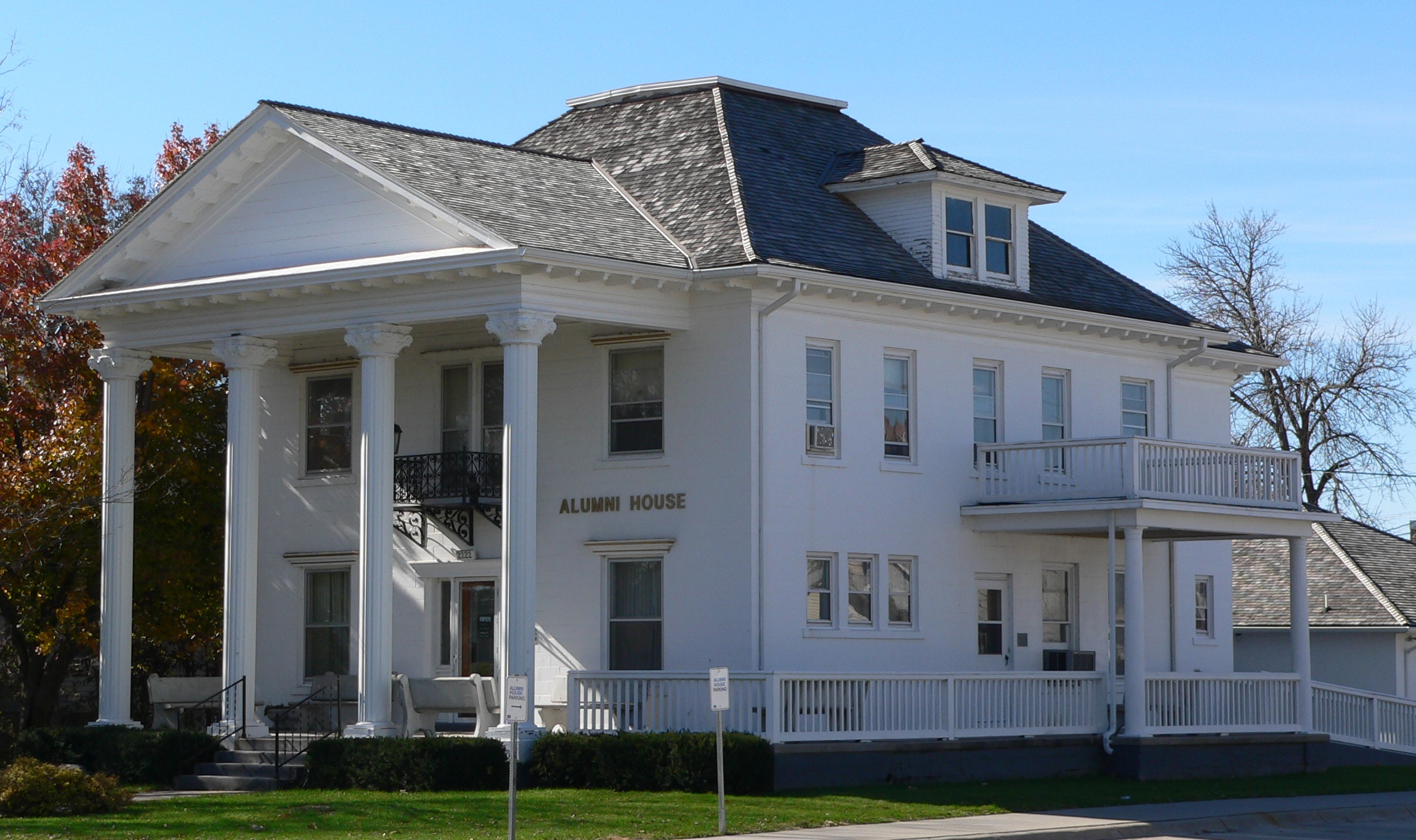

- Location within Nebraska Location within the United States
- Location: 2222 9th Avenue, Kearney, Nebraska
- Coordinates: 40°41′55″N 99°05′39″W
- Area: less than one acre
- Built: 1906
- Architect: George A. Berlinghof
- Architectural style: Classical Revival
- NRHP reference No.: 80002441
- Added to NRHP: February 28, 1980

The Dr. A.O. Thomas House is a historic house in Kearney, Nebraska. It was built in 1906 for August O. Thomas, the founding president of the Kearney State Normal School, later known as the University of Nebraska at Kearney, from 1905 to 1914. It later belonged to Laura Elliott, followed by Harold W. Swan, and it was later acquired by the Kearney State College Alumni Association. It was designed in the Classical Revival style by architect George A. Berlinghof. It has been listed on the National Register of Historic Places since February 28, 1980.
