= Crawford County Courthouse (Iowa) =

- U.S. National Register of Historic Places
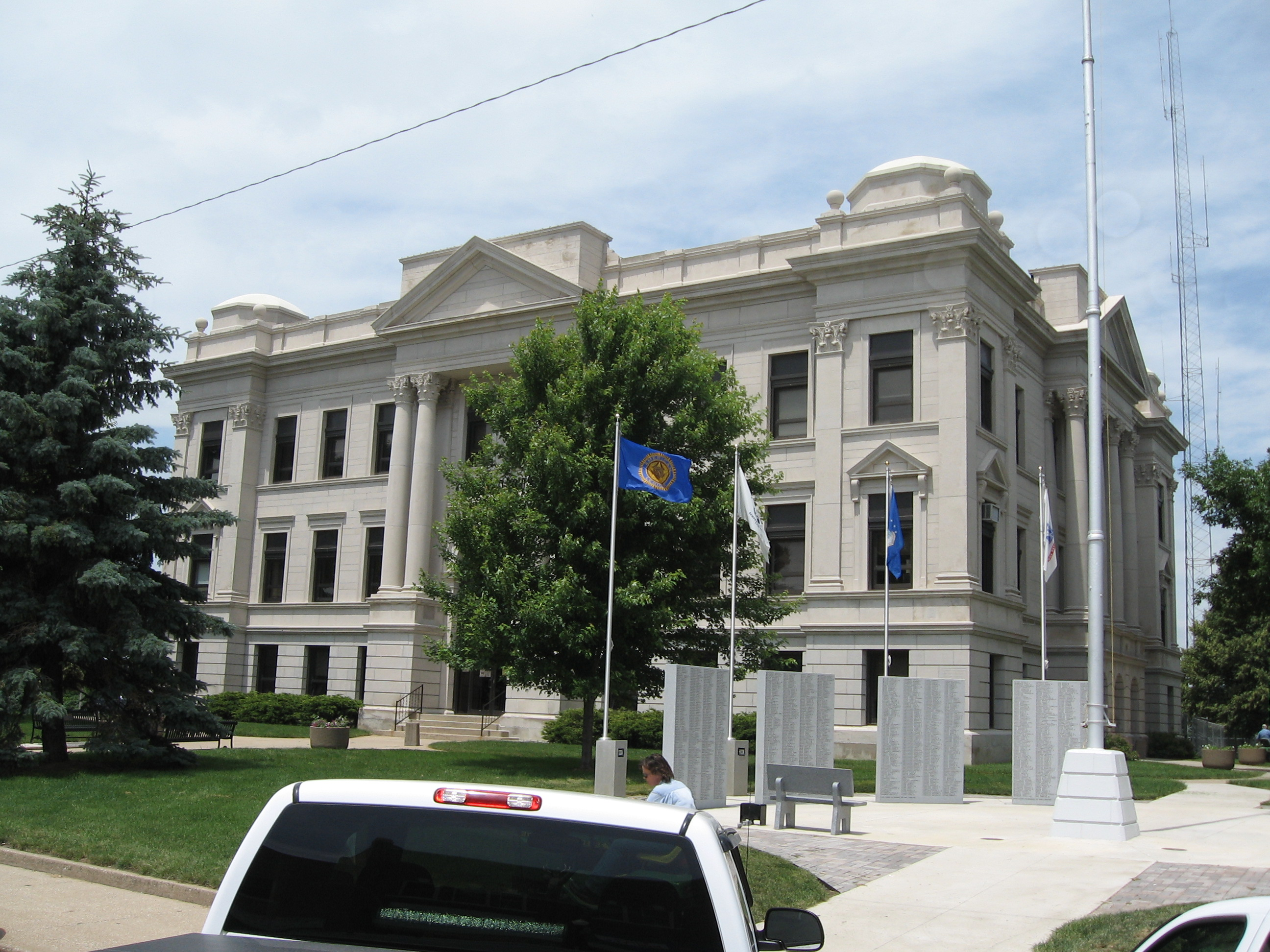
- The Crawford County courthouse in Denison

- Location within Iowa Location within the United States
- Interactive map showing the location for Crawford County Courthouse
- Location: Broadway between Ave. B and Ave. C, Denison, Iowa
- Coordinates: 42°1′2.2218″N 95°21′24.2742″W
- Area: less than one acre
- Built: 1904-1905
- Architect: George A. Berlinghof
- Architectural style: Beaux-Arts
- MPS: County Courthouses in Iowa TR
- NRHP reference No.: 81000232
- Added to NRHP: July 2, 1981

The Crawford County Courthouse is in Denison, Iowa, United States, the county seat of Crawford County. It was listed on the National Register of Historic Places in 1981. The courthouse is the second building the county has used for court functions and county administration.

== History ==
J.W. Denison, a Baptist minister, owned 200,000 acres (81,000 ha) in Harrison and Crawford counties. He offered to build a courthouse, hotel, and store if the site was named the county seat. His offer was accepted and the place was called Denison. The first courthouse was a clay structure completed in 1859. In addition to its use as a courthouse, the building also functioned as a lecture hall, church auditorium, banquet hall, and Sunday school. It was used for dancing once before protests put an end to that and other festive usages. The first Crawford County Fair was held on the courthouse property in October 1860. A frame addition was built that doubled its size in the 1870s. It was considered unsightly, and it became known as "the wart." The building was added onto again in 1881.

A $75,000 bond issue was passed in 1902 to build a new courthouse. Another bond issue was needed to spend an additional $40,000. The present courthouse was completed for about $115,000 in 1905. It was designed by Nebraska architect George A. Berlinghof in the Beaux-Arts style. The exterior is covered with blocks of Ohio marble, some of which weigh seven tons. It originally had a dome that became to heavy for the structure and it was removed around 1945. The old courthouse had been sold in 1903 and moved across the street. It was used for a variety of commercial enterprises in subsequent years.

== See also ==
- List of Iowa county courthouses
