= Scottish Rite Temple (Lincoln, Nebraska) =

- U.S. National Register of Historic Places
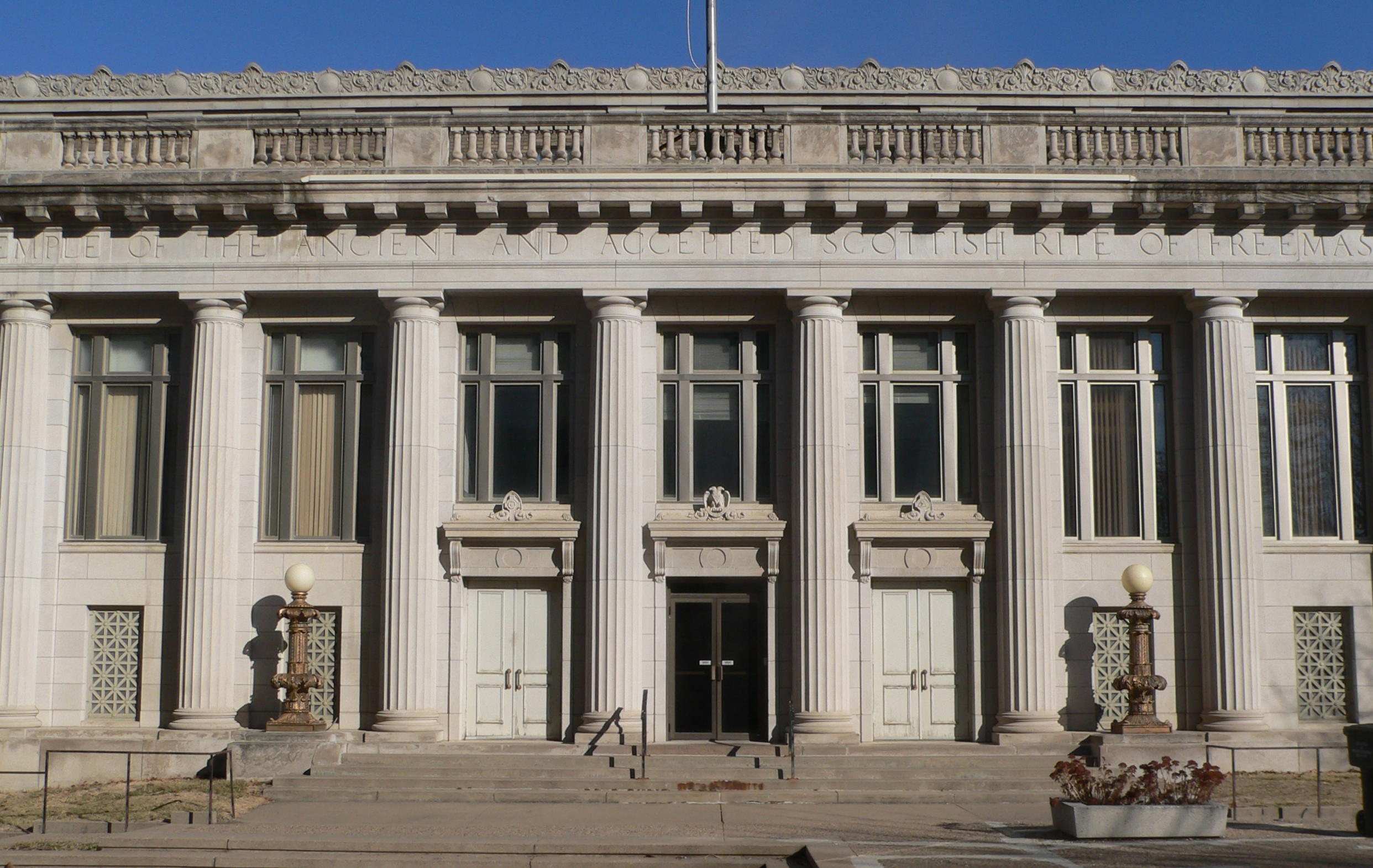
- Central portion of front (west side) of Scottish Rite Temple, facing Centennial Mall.

- Location within Nebraska Location within the United States
- Location: 332 Centennial Mall S, Lincoln, Nebraska
- Coordinates: 40°48′38.2″N 96°41′57.5″W
- Area: less than one acre
- Built: 1916
- Architect: Berlinghof & Davis; Et al.
- Architectural style: Classical Revival
- NRHP reference No.: 86003359
- Added to NRHP: December 01, 1986

The Scottish Rite Temple in Lincoln, Nebraska is a building from 1916. It was listed on the National Register of Historic Places in 1986.

It is a massive, grand building designed by architects Berlinghof & Davis. It has a "colossal order of ten fluted Roman Doric columns on the west front, set in antis between blocky end pavilions. The south side is the only other fully developed, limestone-clad facade, with five bays separated by shallow paired, Roman Doric pilasters. Both the west and the south facades have full entablatures. On the west, the frieze above the pavilions has Greek and Latin inscriptions, while above the colonnade the frieze is inscribed "TEMPLE OF THE ANCIENT AND ACCEPTED SCOTTISH RITE OF FREEMASONRY". The south frieze reads "HUMANITY LIBERTY FRATERNITY". Above the denticular cornice is a parapet pierced with balustrades, corresponding with the intercolumnation. The attic story is recessed from the north, west, and south facades, masking its buff brick walls behind the parapet when viewed from the west or south. The attic is crowned with an ornate gray terra cotta cornice which closely mimics the limestone below."
