= Greeley Center, Nebraska =

Village in Greeley County, Nebraska, United States

Greeley Center
- Village
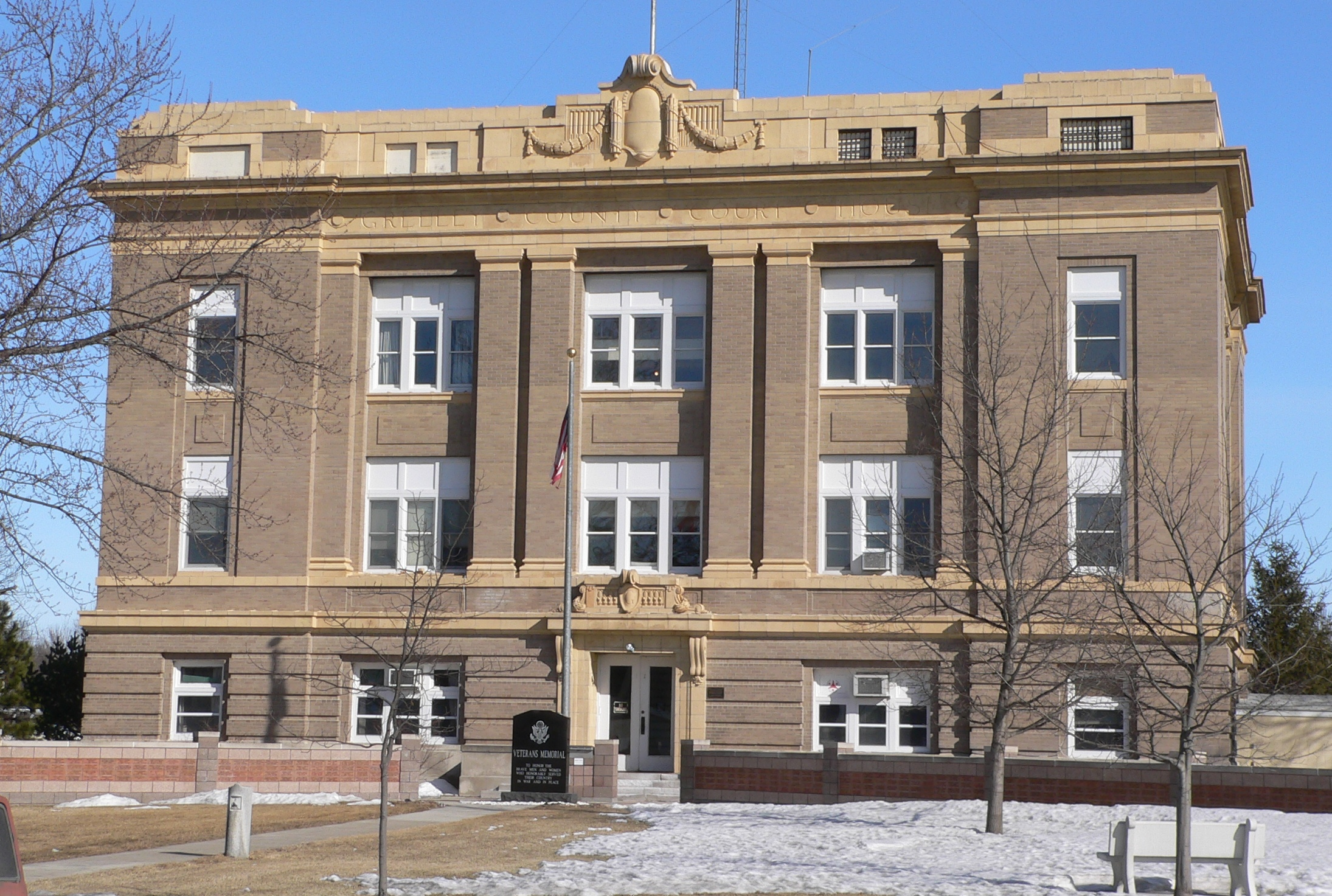
- Greeley County Courthouse in Greeley

- Location within the state of Nebraska
- Coordinates: 41°32′54″N 98°31′50″W
- Country: United States
- State: Nebraska
- County: Greeley

Area
  - Total: 0.63 sq mi (1.63 km^{2})
  - Land: 0.63 sq mi (1.63 km^{2})
  - Water: 0 sq mi (0.00 km^{2})
- Elevation: 2,021 ft (616 m)

Population (2020)
  - Total: 402
  - Density: 638.8/sq mi (246.63/km^{2})
- Time zone: UTC-6 (Central (CST))
  - Summer (DST): UTC-5 (CST)
- ZIP Code: 68842
- FIPS code: 31-20050
- GNIS feature ID: 2398200
- Website: greeleyne.com

Greeley Center, often shortened to simply Greeley, is a village in and the county seat of Greeley County, Nebraska, United States. The population was 403 at the 2020 census. The village resides in central Nebraska.

== History ==
Greeley Center was established as a village in 1887 when the Chicago, Burlington and Quincy Railroad was extended to that point. It was named from its position near the geographical center of Greeley county. Greeley Center was named after Horace Greeley, a politician and journalist. The first people to be settled there were in 1871.

In 1890, the seat of Greeley County was transferred to Greeley Center from Scotia.

== Demographics ==
Historical population
Census	Pop.	Note	%±
1890	492		—
1900	552		12.2%
1910	845		53.1%
1920	919		8.8%
1930	857		−6.7%
1940	891		4.0%
1950	787		−11.7%
1960	656		−16.6%
1970	580		−11.6%
1980	597		2.9%
1990	562		−5.9%
2000	531		−5.5%
2010	466		−12.2%
2020	402		−13.7%
U.S. Decennial Census

=== 2020 census ===
As of the 2020 census, there are 2,197 people living in Greeley County. It covers Greeley, Wolbach, Spalding, and Scotia. As of 2023, there are 941 households. The population density is 3.8 people per square mile. The racial makeup, as of 2023, is 97.8% white, two or more races were 0.9% and hispanic or latino was 3.4%

Greeley, Nebraska has a small-town atmosphere with a median age of 50.4, indicating its an older town. Over the past few years, there has been a steady decline in population. In 1990, the population hit its peak with 562 people and has decreased about 28% since.

The median income for a resident or family in Greeley, Nebraska is about $45,000 annually.

=== 2010 census ===
As of the census of 2010, there were 466 people, 204 households, and 116 families residing in the village. The population density was 739.7 inhabitants per square mile (285.6/km^{2}). There were 252 housing units at an average density of 400.0 per square mile (154.4/km^{2}). The racial makeup of the village was 98.9% White and 1.1% from two or more races. Hispanic or Latino of any race were 2.6% of the population.

There were 204 households, of which 21.6% had children under the age of 18 living with them, 48.0% were married couples living together, 7.4% had a female householder with no husband present, 1.5% had a male householder with no wife present, and 43.1% were non-families. 40.2% of all households were made up of individuals, and 20.1% had someone living alone who was 65 years of age or older. The average household size was 2.14 and the average family size was 2.92.

The median age in the village was 49.8 years. 20.4% of residents were under the age of 18; 6.7% were between the ages of 18 and 24; 17% were from 25 to 44; 29.6% were from 45 to 64; and 26.4% were 65 years of age or older. The gender makeup of the village was 50.6% male and 49.4% female.

=== 2000 census ===
As of the census of 2000, there were 527 people, 213 households, and 128 families residing in the village. The population density was 844.5 inhabitants per square mile (326.1/km^{2}). There were 238 housing units at an average density of 378.5 per square mile (146.1/km^{2}). The racial makeup of the village was 99.06% White, 0.19% African American, 0.38% Asian, 0.19% from other races, and 0.19% from two or more races. Hispanic or Latino of any race were 0.19% of the population.

There were 213 households, out of which 28.6% had children under the age of 18 living with them, 47.4% were married couples living together, 8.9% had a female householder with no husband present, and 39.9% were non-families. 39.0% of all households were made up of individuals, and 23.9% had someone living alone who was 65 years of age or older. The average household size was 2.35 and the average family size was 3.16.

In the village, the population was spread out, with 27.7% under the age of 18, 5.5% from 18 to 24, 20.9% from 25 to 44, 20.2% from 45 to 64, and 25.8% who were 65 years of age or older. The median age was 42 years. For every 100 females, there were 90.3 males. For every 100 females age 18 and over, there were 84.6 males.

The median income for a household in the village was $31,667, and the median income for a family was $43,036. Males had a median income of $25,000 versus $20,875 for females. The per capita income for the village was $15,791. About 6.4% of families and 10.3% of the population were below the poverty line, including 18.8% of those under age 18 and 6.8% of those age 65 or over.

== Geography ==
According to the United States Census Bureau, the village has a total area of 0.63 square miles (1.63 km^{2}), all of it land.

=== Climate ===
Climate data for Greeley, Nebraska (1991–2020 normals, extremes 1907–present)
Month	Jan	Feb	Mar	Apr	May	Jun	Jul	Aug	Sep	Oct	Nov	Dec	Year
Record high °F (°C)	75 (24)	81 (27)	91 (33)	100 (38)	101 (38)	107 (42)	114 (46)	109 (43)	104 (40)	97 (36)	84 (29)	77 (25)	114 (46)
Mean maximum °F (°C)	58.6 (14.8)	62.9 (17.2)	76.0 (24.4)	83.8 (28.8)	90.0 (32.2)	94.8 (34.9)	97.4 (36.3)	95.7 (35.4)	91.7 (33.2)	85.9 (29.9)	73.2 (22.9)	60.0 (15.6)	98.8 (37.1)
Mean daily maximum °F (°C)	34.0 (1.1)	38.1 (3.4)	49.9 (9.9)	60.6 (15.9)	70.7 (21.5)	81.4 (27.4)	86.5 (30.3)	84.4 (29.1)	77.3 (25.2)	64.0 (17.8)	49.0 (9.4)	37.1 (2.8)	61.1 (16.2)
Daily mean °F (°C)	22.3 (−5.4)	25.9 (−3.4)	36.5 (2.5)	46.9 (8.3)	57.9 (14.4)	68.8 (20.4)	73.8 (23.2)	71.4 (21.9)	62.7 (17.1)	49.5 (9.7)	35.8 (2.1)	25.5 (−3.6)	48.1 (8.9)
Mean daily minimum °F (°C)	10.6 (−11.9)	13.7 (−10.2)	23.1 (−4.9)	33.2 (0.7)	45.1 (7.3)	56.2 (13.4)	61.1 (16.2)	58.4 (14.7)	48.1 (8.9)	35.1 (1.7)	22.6 (−5.2)	14.0 (−10.0)	35.1 (1.7)
Mean minimum °F (°C)	−10.4 (−23.6)	−5.9 (−21.1)	5.1 (−14.9)	17.9 (−7.8)	30.5 (−0.8)	43.1 (6.2)	49.4 (9.7)	46.1 (7.8)	32.7 (0.4)	18.2 (−7.7)	4.9 (−15.1)	−5.3 (−20.7)	−14.7 (−25.9)
Record low °F (°C)	−38 (−39)	−34 (−37)	−17 (−27)	3 (−16)	20 (−7)	27 (−3)	36 (2)	35 (2)	19 (−7)	4 (−16)	−16 (−27)	−26 (−32)	−38 (−39)
Average precipitation inches (mm)	0.52 (13)	0.63 (16)	1.41 (36)	2.61 (66)	4.18 (106)	4.09 (104)	3.19 (81)	3.26 (83)	2.28 (58)	1.99 (51)	0.95 (24)	0.70 (18)	25.81 (656)
Average snowfall inches (cm)	6.5 (17)	7.3 (19)	4.9 (12)	2.2 (5.6)	0.2 (0.51)	0.0 (0.0)	0.0 (0.0)	0.0 (0.0)	0.0 (0.0)	0.7 (1.8)	3.0 (7.6)	5.0 (13)	29.8 (76)
Average precipitation days (≥ 0.01 in)	4.0	4.5	6.1	8.5	10.6	10.1	7.9	8.5	6.6	6.7	4.0	4.0	81.5
Average snowy days (≥ 0.1 in)	3.1	3.4	1.6	0.9	0.1	0.0	0.0	0.0	0.0	0.5	1.3	3.0	13.9
Source: NOAA

== Notable natives ==
- Maurice Lukefahr - Pioneering researcher in the fields of host plant resistance and environmental control of cotton insect pests.
- Jim Sullivan - Musician and singer-songwriter who disappeared without a trace in New Mexico in March 1975.
