= Greeley County Courthouse (Nebraska) =

- U.S. National Register of Historic Places
- U.S. Historic district
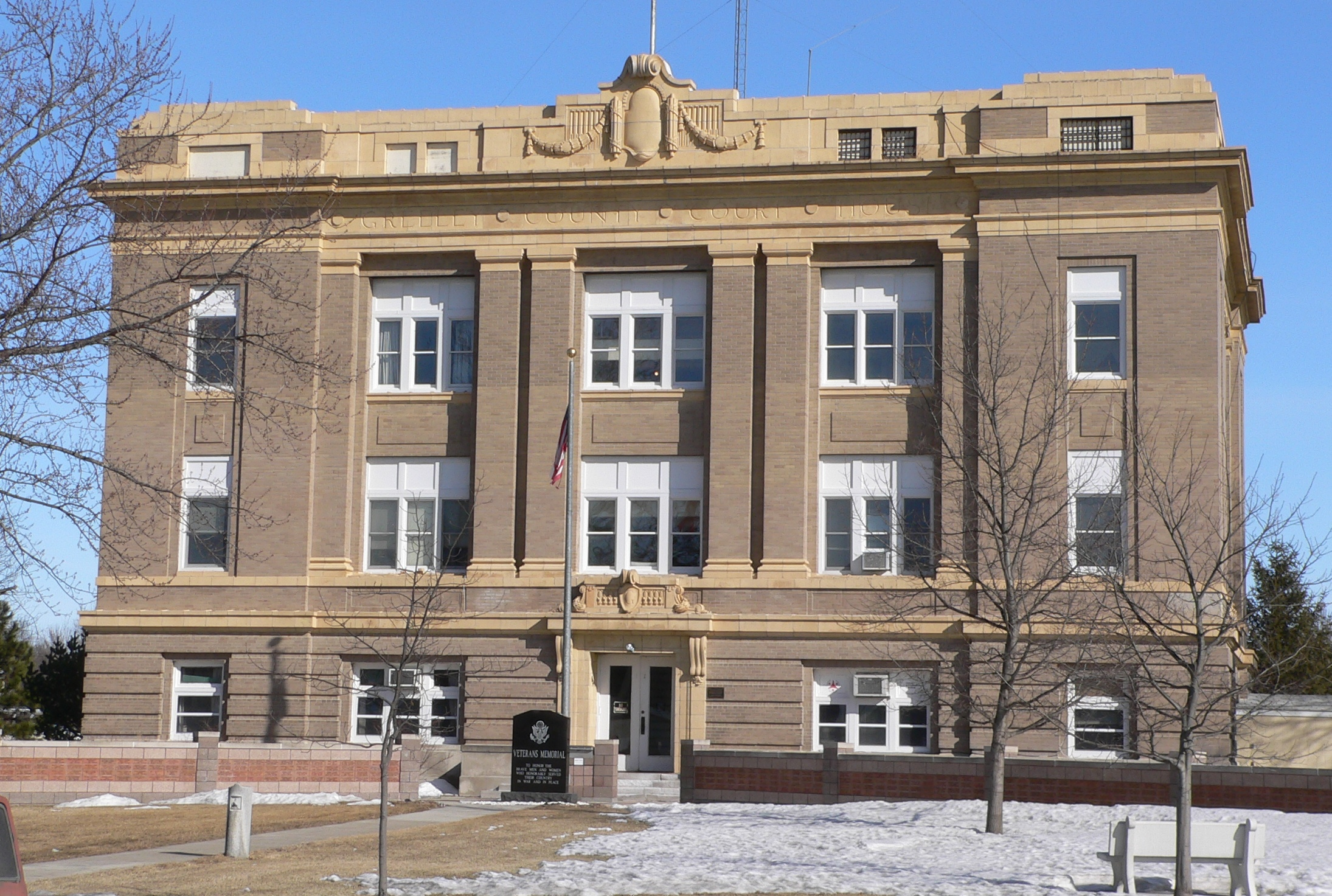

- Location within Nebraska Location within the United States
- Location: Kildare St., Greeley, Nebraska
- Coordinates: 41°32′53″N 98°31′47″W
- Area: 2 acres (0.81 ha)
- Built: 1913-14
- Architect: Berlinghof & Davis
- Architectural style: Classical Revival
- MPS: County Courthouses of Nebraska MPS
- NRHP reference No.: 89002228
- Added to NRHP: January 10, 1990

The Greeley County Courthouse in Greeley, Nebraska was built in 1913–14. It was designed by architects Berlinghof & Davis in Classical Revival style. It was listed on the National Register of Historic Places in 1990.

It is a three-story building on a basement, with foundation and trim of gold-hued limestone, and walls of greyish-tan brick. It has been described as "a good example of the work of Nebraska architect George A. Berlinghof (here as Berlinghof & Davis), representing the evolution of his designs. The courthouse is a less elaborate version of the Howard County Courthouse built in 1912-15 in the next county south of Greeley."

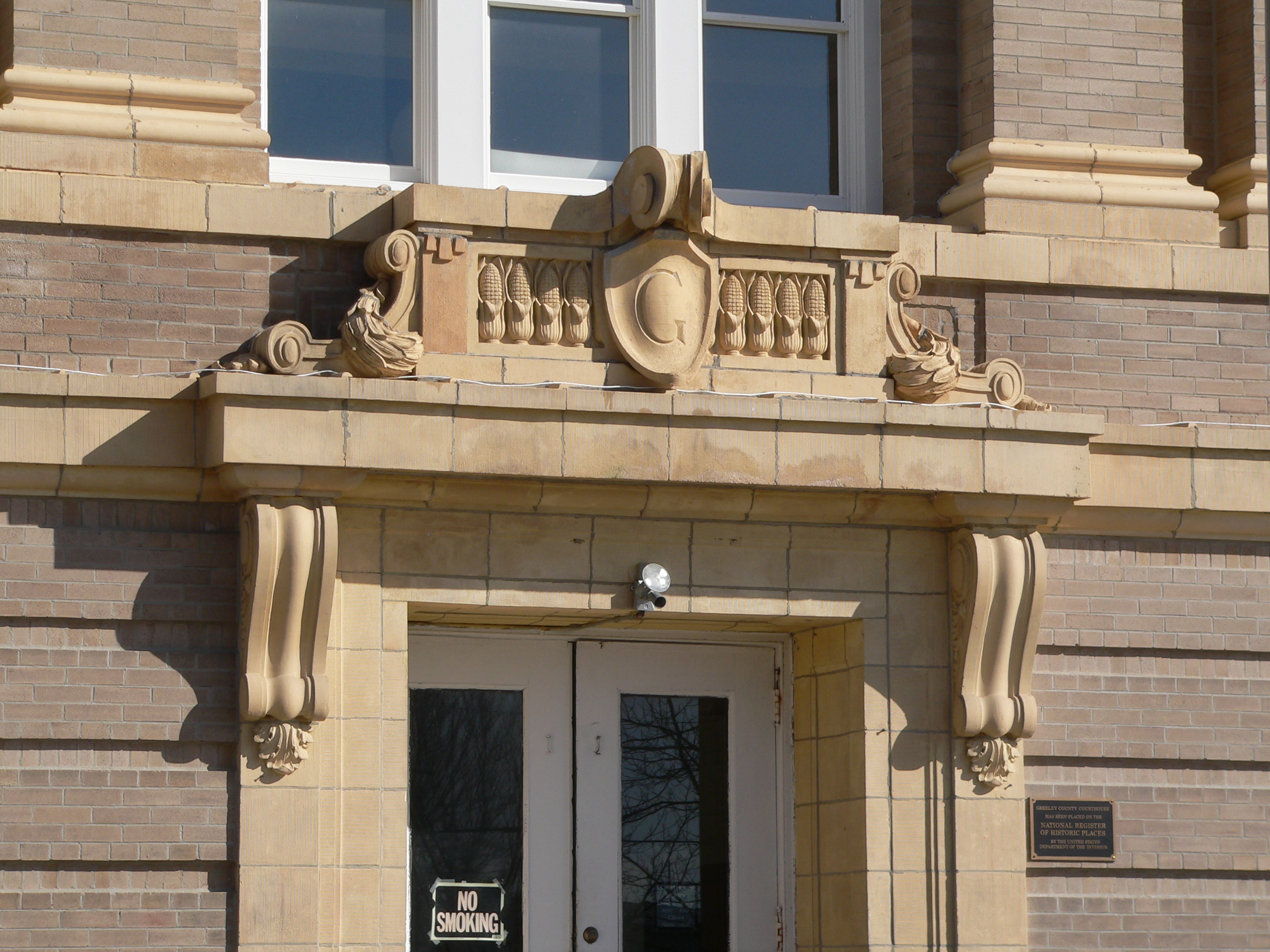
Front (west) entrance detail

A former pumphouse is a second contributing building on the property.
