= Cecil Calvert Coursey =

American architect

- Born: 1898
- Died: 1956; North Platte, Nebraska, U.S.
- Occupation: Architect

Cecil Calvert Coursey (1898–1956) was an American architect. From 1929 to 1956, he designed nearly "400 public buildings and churches", including the NRHP-listed Lincoln County Courthouse in North Platte, Nebraska.
