= Grenville M. Dodge House =

Historic house in Iowa, United States

- U.S. National Register of Historic Places
- U.S. National Historic Landmark
- U.S. Historic district – Contributing property
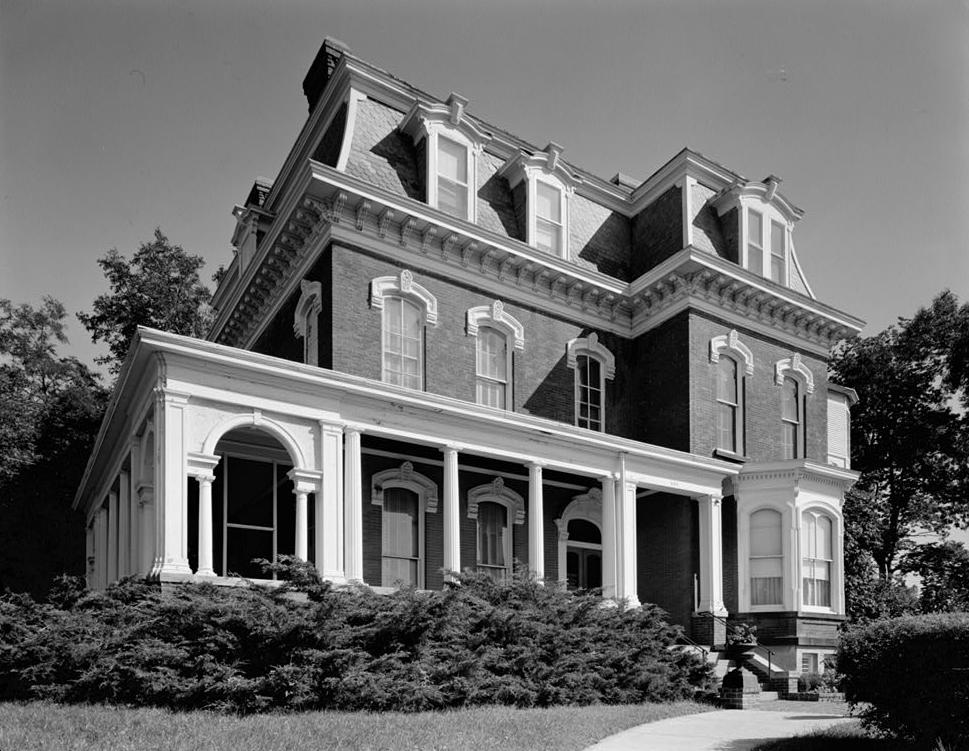
- General Dodge's house
- Location: 605 South 3rd Street; Council Bluffs, Iowa, US
- Coordinates: 41°15′18″N 95°50′52″W
- Area: 1.8 acres (7,300 m^{2})
- Built: 1869
- Architect: W.W. Boyington
- Architectural style: Second Empire
- Part of: Willow-Bluff-3rd Street Historic District (ID05001019)
- NRHP reference No.: 66000338

Significant dates
- Added to NRHP: October 15, 1966
- Designated NHL: November 5, 1961

The Grenville M. Dodge House is a historic house museum in Council Bluffs, Iowa, United States. This Second Empire mansion, built in 1869, was the home of Grenville M. Dodge (1831–1916), a Union Army general, politician, and a major figure in the development of the railroads across the American West. The house was declared a National Historic Landmark in 1961 for its association with Dodge; in 2005 it was included as a contributing property in the Willow-Bluff-3rd Street Historic District. It is now owned by the city of Council Bluffs and is open for tours.

== Description and history ==
The Dodge House is located southeast of downtown Council Bluffs, on the east side of 3rd Street, between 5th and Fairview Avenues. It is a large and rambling three-story brick building, designed by W.W. Boyington of Chicago and built in 1869 at a cost of $35,000. It has a mansard roof with a modillioned eave, pierced by dormers with eared and rounded tops. Most windows are tall and narrow, with segmented-arch tops, some of which have decorative stone hoods. The interior features elaborate interior black walnut woodwork, and original fixtures including bronze hinges with silver butts. The house is decorated with items from the Dodge family. The property also includes an 1871 carriage barn, which houses a caretaker's residence.

Grenville Dodge was involved in railroad construction from an early age, and he distinguished himself with his engineering skills, which were notably applied during the American Civil War in the replacement of destroyed bridges. After the war he became chief engineer of the Union Pacific Railroad, leading the effort that successfully completed the first transcontinental railroad in 1869. In addition to his engineering, Dodge served in managerial and leadership capacities with the railroads, and was politically active, serving in the United States Congress.

Dodge's house remained in the family until 1950, when it was converted into apartments. The city purchased it in 1963 for conversion to a museum, reversing most of the alterations made, restoring the home to the period of Dodge's occupancy. Both the Dodge House and the Beresheim House next door are operated together as a house museum.

== See also ==
- List of National Historic Landmarks in Iowa
- National Register of Historic Places listings in Pottawattamie County, Iowa
