= Willow–Bluff–3rd Street Historic District =

Historic district in Iowa, United States

- U.S. National Register of Historic Places
- U.S. Historic district
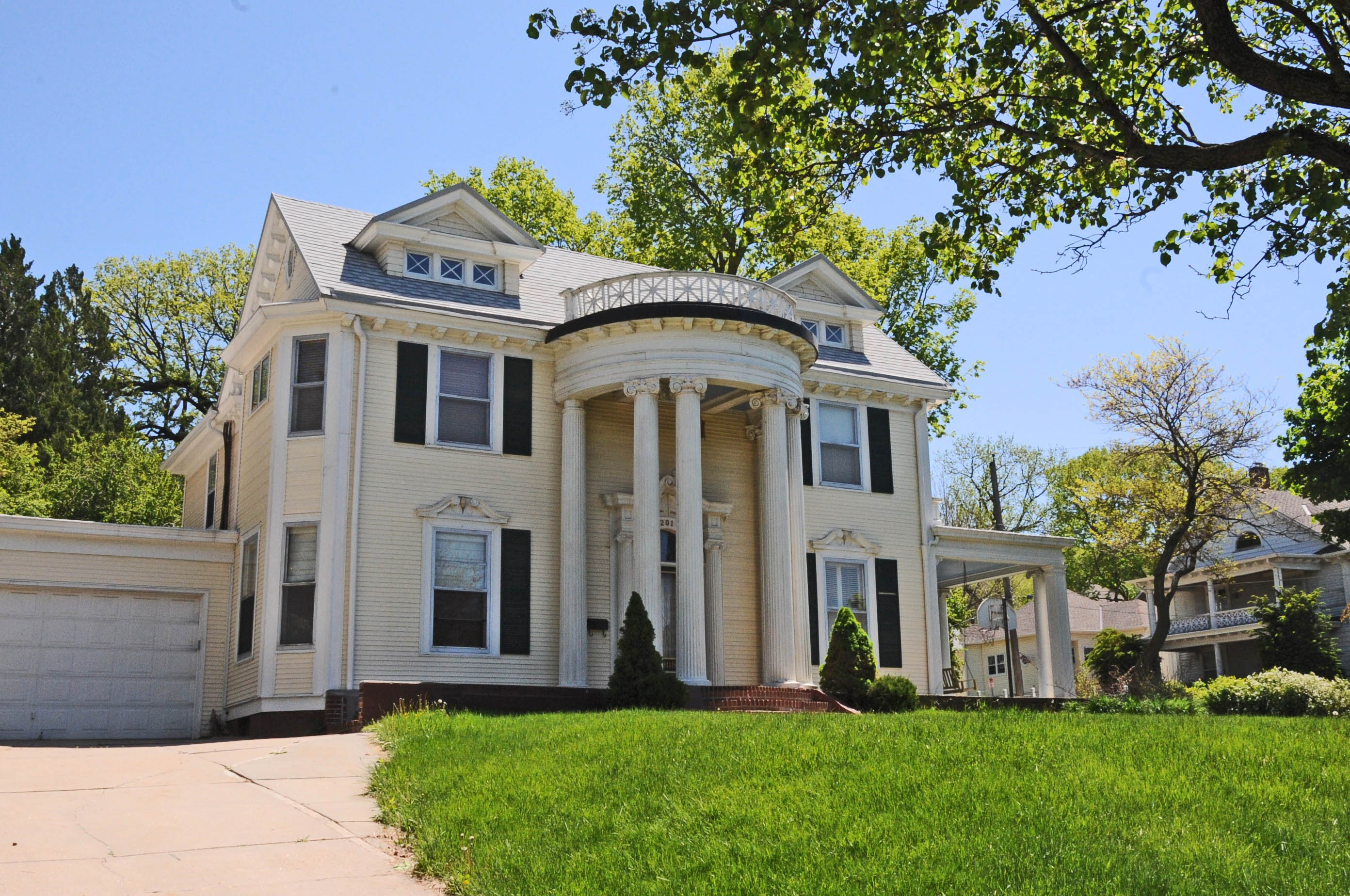

- Location within Iowa Location within the United States
- Location: Roughly bounded by Worth, High School Ave., Clark Ave., and the western side of Bluff St., Council Bluffs, Iowa
- Coordinates: 41°15′24″N 95°50′51″W
- Area: 32 acres (13 ha)
- Architectural style: Late 19th and 20th Century Revivals; Late 19th and Early 20th Century American Movements
- NRHP reference No.: 05001019
- Added to NRHP: September 15, 2005

The Willow–Bluff–3rd Street Historic District is a nationally recognized historic district located in Council Bluffs, Iowa, United States. It was listed on the National Register of Historic Places in 2005. At the time of its nomination the district consisted of 260 resources, including 162 contributing buildings, 56 contributing structures, 36 non-contributing buildings, and six non-contributing structures. The district is primarily a residential area that is adjacent to the central business district to the west. Part of the district is in Jackson's Addition, which is the first addition to the original town of Council Bluffs. It also sits along the base of the loess bluffs to the east.

The neighborhood generally developed between 1855 and 1930. The houses that populate the district were built in the revival styles and architectural movements that were popular during this time period. In addition to residential architecture there are two churches and a former high gymnasium that are contributing properties: the Seventh Day Adventist Church (c. 1920), Our Savior Lutheran Church (1926), and the Lincoln High School Gymnasium (1926). Three buildings that were individually listed on the National Register of Historic Places are also contributing properties in the district. They include: the Grenville M. Dodge House (1869), the Wickham-De Vol House (1878), and the August Beresheim House (1899). The streets and retaining walls make up the contributing and non-contributing structures. The non-contributing buildings are largely garages.
