= Ellery L. Davis =

American architect (1887–1956)

- Born: 1887; Lake City, Florida, U.S.
- Died: March 21, 1956; Omaha, Nebraska, U.S.
- Education: Lincoln High School; University of Nebraska
- Occupation: Architect

Ellery L. Davis (1887 – March 21, 1956) was an American architect based in Lincoln, Nebraska.

== Early life ==
Davis was born in 1887 in Lake City, Florida. He graduated from Lincoln High School in 1903 and the University of Nebraska in 1907.

== Career ==
From 1911 to 1917, he worked in partnership with George A. Berlinghof in the firm of George Berlinghof and Ellery Davis. Following the dissolution of that partnership, he worked on his own until 1920 when he formed a partnership with Walter Wilson. The firm of Davis and Wilson is credited with the design of some of the most important buildings in the city of Lincoln, including Gold's department store, the Stuart Building and Theater, the Grainger Brothers building, Westminster Presbyterian Church, Rudge Memorial Chapel, several public schools, and numerous buildings on the University of Nebraska campus.

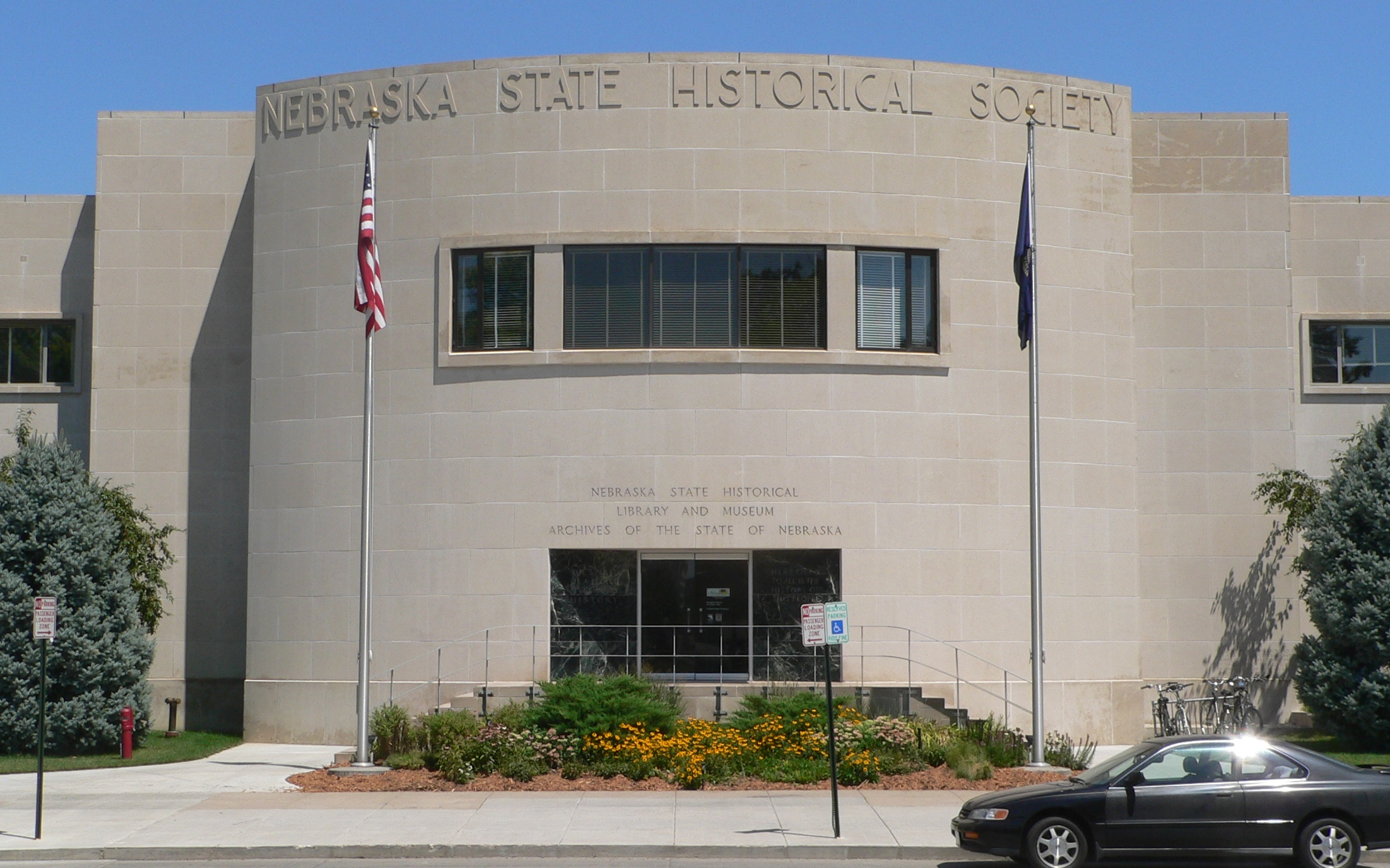
The Nebraska State Historical Society Building, designed by Davis.

Davis' son, Ellery H. Davis joined him in the Davis and Wilson firm in the years after World War II. Ellery L. Davis died in 1956, and the firm used the name Davis & Wilson until 1968, when it was renamed Davis, Fenton, Stange and Darling. It has operated under the name Davis Design since 1995.

Davis designed the Modern Movement-style Nebraska State Historical Society Building at 1500 R St. Lincoln, NE (Davis, Ellery Lothrop), which is listed on the U.S. National Register of Historic Places.

== Personal life and death ==
Davis married Mary Camille Hall; they had a son and a daughter. He died on March 21, 1956, in Omaha, Nebraska.
