= Franklin County Courthouse (Nebraska) =

- U.S. National Register of Historic Places
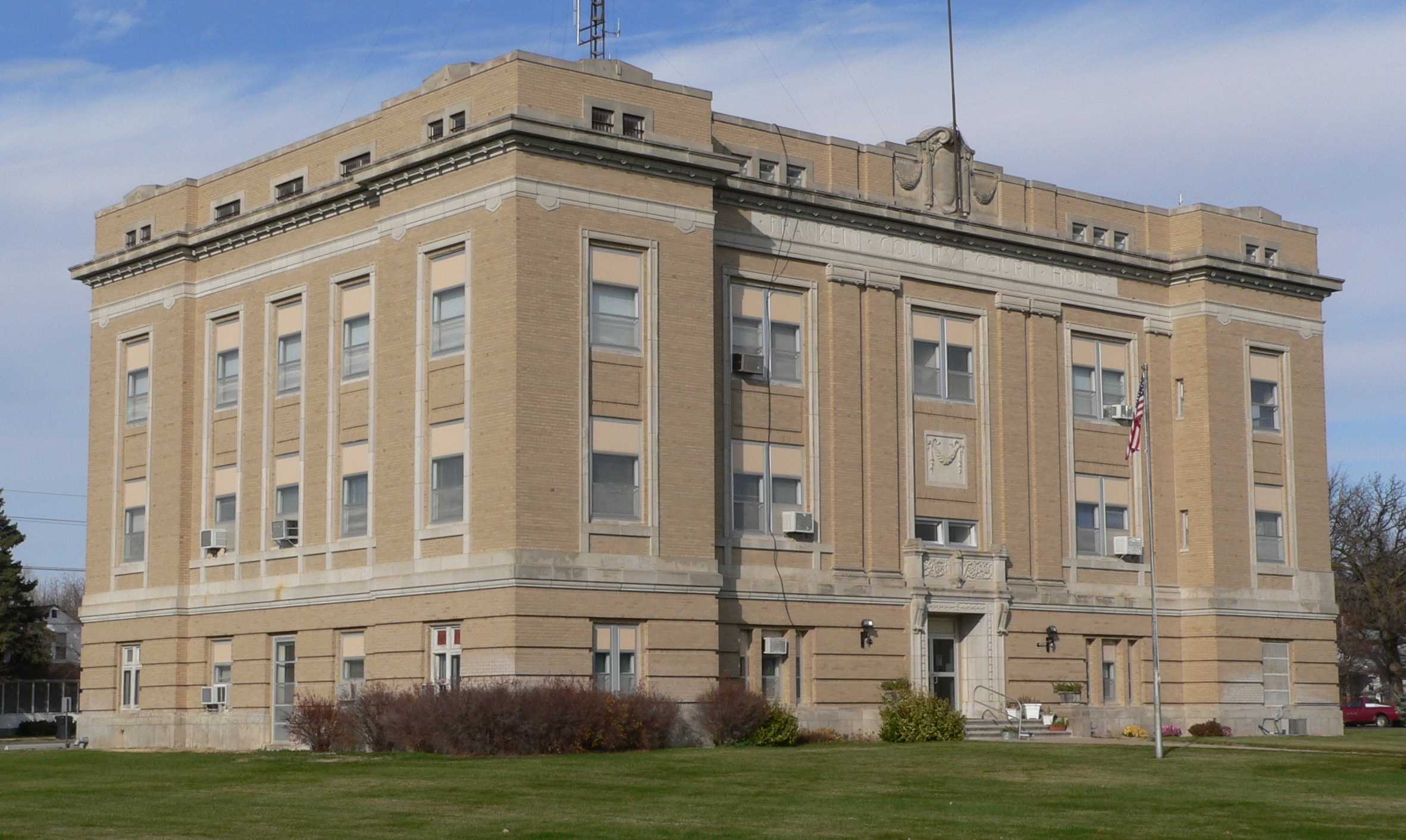

- Location within Nebraska Location within the United States
- Interactive map showing the location for Franklin County Courthouse
- Location: 15th Ave. between N and O Sts., Franklin, Nebraska
- Coordinates: 40°05′51″N 98°57′14″W
- Area: 1.1 acres (0.45 ha)
- Built: 1925
- Architect: George A. Berlinghof
- Architectural style: Classical Revival
- MPS: County Courthouses of Nebraska MPS
- NRHP reference No.: 90000962
- Added to NRHP: July 5, 1990

The Franklin County Courthouse in Franklin, Nebraska is a courthouse built in 1925. It was listed on the National Register of Historic Places in 1990.

It is a Classical Revival-style building designed by architect George A. Berlinghof.
